= Opinion polling for the 2018 Costa Rican general election =

This is opinion polling for the Costa Rican general election in 2018.

View source data.

Date	Source	Alvarado PAC	Alvarado PREN	Desanti PLN	Araya FA	Castro PIN	Campos PRC	Guevara ML	Hernández PRSC	López PASE	Mena PNG	Piza PUSC	Redondo ADC	Vega PT	None	N/A	Lead
19–27 April 2017	Cid Gallup	2%	-	29%	-	24%	-	8%	4%	-	-	11%	-	-	-	22%	5%
25–27 May 2017	Opol	0.76%	3.31%	34.95%	2.55%	18.36%	-	6.63%	6.88%	-	0.51%	1.27%	-	-	27.5%	16.3%	16%
22–24 June 2017	Opol	4.90%	3.99%	29.5%	1.75%	19.19%	-	3.92%	9.45%	-	0.56%	20.65%	0.84%		25.7%	22.2%	9%
25 - 27 July 2017	Opol	10.79%	5.83%	31.22%	2.25%	14.48%	-	6.82%	9.63%	-	0.44%	17.56%	0.33%	-	-	-	14%
17 - 26 July 2017	CIEP	8%	-	25.2%	0.4%	5.8%	-	-	1.1%	-	0.3%	11.5%	-	-	-	42%	14%
29 - 31 August 2017	Opol	6%	-	36,76%	1,86%	20,31%	-	8,44%	6,44%	-	-	12,59%	9%	-	-	-	16%
27 August - 2 September 2017	Enfoques	2%	-	23,7%	-	11,4%	-	7,8%	2,9%	-	-	10,5%	-	-	14,6%	22,4%	12%
4 - 11 September 2017	CID Gallup	20%	-	49%	13%	51%	-	34%	19%	-	7%	40%	-	-	-	-	2%
5–13 September 2017	CID Gallup	6%	-	23%	1%	16%	-	8%	2%	-	-	13%	-	-		30%	7%
25 - 28 September 2017	Opol	7.17%	5.7%	31.54%	1.49%	18.94%	-	7.40%	8.6%	-	1.07%	17.86%	0.42%	-	-	-	13%
3 - 11 October 2017	CIEP	6.3%	-	19.6%	1.7%	12.6%	-	3.4%	1.9%	-	-	11%	-	-	-	40.3%	7%
27 - 29 October 2017	Opol	6.65%	5.01%	31.33%	2.64%	23.77%	2.9%	4.28%	9.38%	0.36%	0.73%	12.93%	0.55%	0.27%	28.43%	21.61%	8%
13 - 15 November 2017	Opol	7.5%	7.1%	30%	3%	24.5%	1.9%	2.3%	9.6%	0.5%	0.6%	11.9%	0.5%	0.6%	18.8%	31%	6%
4 - 16 November 2017	CIEP	4%	2%	15%	2%	15%	-	3%	5%	-	-	11%	-	-	-	37%	Tied
19 - 24 November 2017	CID Gallup	4%	4%	15%	1%	17%	2%	3%	7%	-	-	9%	-	-	-	33%	2%
28 - 29 November 2017	Opol	7.9%	3.9%	29.5%	3.1%	29.1%	1.1%	1.7%	8.5%	1%	0.5%	12.5%	0.4%	0.7%	24%	31%	Tied
20 - 30 November 2017	Idespo	5.8%	2.6%	12.5%	2.2%	16.4%	-	0.7%	4.7%	-	0.4%	11.5%	1.1%	-	2.6%	39.1%	4%
December 2017	CIEP	5%	3%	14%	1.5%	18%	-	0.5%	8%	-	-	13%	-	-	-	42%	4%
December 2017	Opol	4.4%	5.5%	28.7%	1.7%	27%	1%	3.5%	9.9%	0.5%	0.3%	16.7%	0.5%	0.3%	-	-	1%
2 - 4 January 2018	Opol	4.7%	5.5%	27.4%	1.9%	28.8%	1.1%	2.9%	11.1%	0.7%	0.4%	12.5%	1.3%	0.6%	-	-	1%
9 - 11 January 2018	Opol	5.7%	8.3%	26.2%	1.8%	25.3%	1.1%	1.4%	11.1%	0.7%	1.0%	15.3%	1.4%	0.7%	-	-	1%
9 - 14 January 2018	CID-Gallup	5.3%	9.6%	15.5%	1.6%	16.5%	1.7%	3.4%	7.7%		2.8%	12.2%				-	1%
12 - 17 January 2018	Demoscopia	4%	3.5%	16.7%	1%	12.4%	-	4%	9.1%	-	1.2%	14.7%	-	-	11.9%	35%	2%
15 - 18 January 2018	Opol	5.6%	18.4%	22%	1.9%	20.7%	1.3%	2.5%	9.5%	0.8%	1.3%	14.17%	1%	0.4%	-	-	2%
15 - 17 January 2018	CIEP	6%	17%	11%	-	16%	-	-	6%	-	-	9%	-	-	-	-	1%
15 - 20 January 2018	CID Gallup	6%	14%	3%	16%	12%	-	3%	7%	-	4%	12%	-	2%	3%	20%	2%
22 - 24 January 2018	Opol	8%	22.5%	21.9%	1.6%	17.4%	0.7%	1.6%	9.5%	0.8%	0.9%	13.1%	1.3%	0.4%	-	-	1%
22 - 24 January 2018	Demoscopía	8.3%	10.7%	12.7%	0.2%	7.3%	-	1%	4%	-	0.3%	12%	0.5%	-	-	-	Tied
24 - 26 January 2018	CIEP	10.6%	16.9%	12.4%	-	8.6%	-	-	2.8%	-	-	8.2%	-	-	1%	36.5%	4%
31 January 2018	Opol	12.0%	17.4%	13.8%	1.1%	8.5%	0.6%	0.8%	3.8%	0.2%	0.5%	8.3%	0.7%	0.3%	14.1%	19.1%	4%
4 February 2018	First round																
8-9 February 2018	Opol	28.0%	37.6%												23.2%	11.3%	9%
6-8 February 2018	CIEP	42%	45%												-	13%	3%
15-16 February 2018	Opol	29.4%	36.1%												19.7%	14.7%	6.7%
21-23 February 2018	Opol	29.2%	39.2%												15.4%	16.3%	10%
6–17 February 2018	Idespo	52%	29%														23%
28 February - 2 March	Opol	31.1%	39.7%												14%	15.2%	8.6%
27-28 February 2018	CIEP	41%	39%													20%	3%
8-9 March 2018	Opol	31.4%	38.7%												15.1%	14.8%	7.3%
10-15 March 2018	CID Gallup	28.4%	32.9%												38%		4.5%
12-16 March 2018	Opol	27.7%	36.5%												22.2%	13.6%	8.8%
19-21 March 2018	CIEP	42%	43%													15%	1%
19-23 March 2018	Opol	28.5%	36.2%												20.9%	14.4%	7.7%
