= 2009 National Liberation Party presidential primary =

Costa Rican primary election

National Liberation Party presidential primary, 2009
← 2001	June 7, 2009	2017 →
- Turnout: 517.000
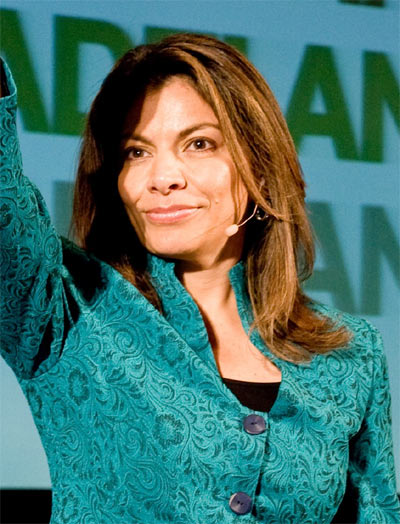

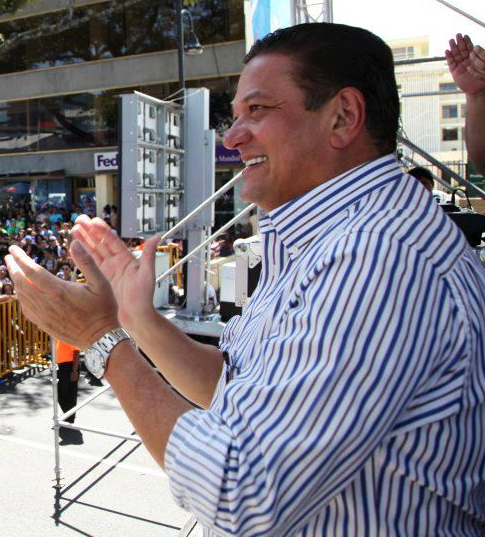
Nominee	Laura Chinchilla	Johnny Araya
Party	PLN	PLN
Popular vote	284.689	213.367
Percentage	55.51%	41.6%
Previous Presidential Candidate
Óscar Arias
Presidential Candidate
Laura Chinchilla

A primary election was held among the members of Costa Rica's then ruling National Liberation Party (PLN) on June 7, 2009 in order to choose the PLN's nominee for presidency in the 2010 general election. The two main candidates for the nomination were then vice-president Laura Chinchilla and San José Mayor Johnny Araya. Former security minister Fernando Berrocal also ran a basically testimonial candidacy. PLN's main rival party, PAC, ran its own convention a month before.

PLN primaries, known as National Conventions (Convención Nacional Liberacionista) were common place since the Party's foundation, yet in the previous election of 2006 PLN's nominee former president Óscar Arias seeking re-election ran unopposed and was designated by the party's National Assembly. Unlike its rival PAC, PLN's election was an open primary and as such every Costa Rican could vote as far as pledge written membership to the party (PLN holds open primaries since the 70s). Debates among PLN and PAC's candidates respectively were organized in different colleges, NGOs and news networks.

Former minister Antonio Álvarez Desanti had recently returned to the party expressing his interest in the nomination, yet party regulations prevent his candidacy due to his recent participation in another party. Desanti dropped from the race supporting Chinchilla. While Chinchilla was seen as close to then incumbent president Arias and his faction, Araya was endorsed by his brother and previous candidate Rolando and by his uncle former president Luis Alberto Monge. The final results were 55% for Chinchilla, 41% for Araya and 2% for Berrocal. Chinchilla will also win the presidential race in 2010.

Araya would maintain his political aspirations and would run unopposed in the next election cycle as other aspirants like Rodrigo Arias (former Prime Minister and Oscar Arias’ brother) and José María Figueres (former president) dropped their candidacies for the 2014 election, which was lost by Araya against PAC's candidate Luis Guillermo Solís.

== See also ==
- 2010 Costa Rican general election
- Citizens' Action Party presidential primary, 2009
