= Juan Diego Castro Fernández =

Costa Rican lawyer and politician (born 1955)

Juan Diego Castro
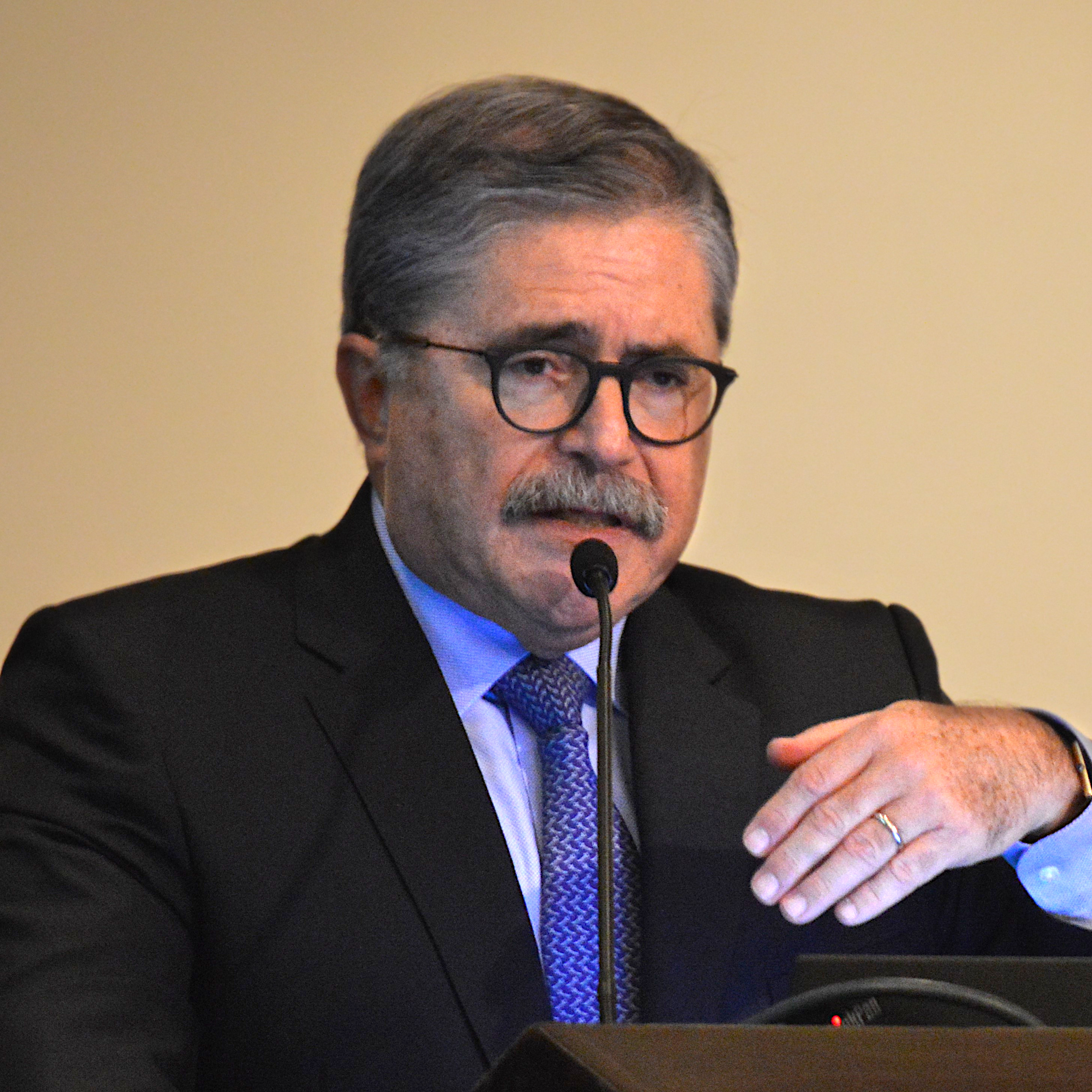
- Castro in 2017

Minister of Justice and Grace
- In office 3 July 1996 – 25 July 1997
- President: José María Figueres Olsen
- Preceded by: Maureen Clarke Clarke
- Succeeded by: Fabián Volio Echeverría

Minister of Public Security
- In office 8 May 1994 – 3 July 1996
- President: José María Figueres Olsen
- Preceded by: Luis Fishman Zonzinski
- Succeeded by: Bernardo Arce Gutiérrez

Personal details
- Born: Juan Diego Castro Fernández; 9 June 1955 (age 71) Cartago, Costa Rica
- Party: Independent (since 2018)
- Other political affiliations: PIN (2017–2018); Worker-Peasant Party (1970s)
- Education: University of Costa Rica (BA); La Salle University
- Occupation: Lawyer; politician; professor; writer

Juan Diego Castro Fernández (born 9 June 1955) is a Costa Rican lawyer and politician who served as Minister of Public Security from 1994 to 1996 and as Minister of Justice and Grace from 1996 to 1997. He had previously served as a municipal councillor in Paraíso from 1978 to 1982.

Castro studied law and criminal sciences at the University of Costa Rica and later obtained a doctorate in mediation from the Universidad La Salle. A criminal defense lawyer by profession, he also served as Grand Master of the Grand Lodge of Costa Rica from 2013 to 2015.

During the administration of President José María Figueres Olsen, Castro held the position of Minister of Public Security. In 1996, after organizing a police demonstration around the Legislative Assembly to pressure lawmakers into approving reforms to the Penal Code, he became the subject of a vote of no confidence promoted by then congressional president Antonio Álvarez Desanti, a member of the ruling National Liberation Party and one of Castro's principal political rivals. It was the first vote of censure against a minister in Costa Rican history. Castro resigned from the ministry in July 1996, citing personal reasons.

He later sought the presidency as the candidate of the National Integration Party in the 2018 general election, but was unsuccessful. During the campaign, some commentators compared Castro to US President Donald Trump and other right-wing anti-establishment populist figures, a characterization that Castro rejected.

== 2018 presidential campaign ==
Before entering the presidential race, Castro was publicly known as a longtime lawyer for Teletica and as a frequent media commentator on criminal law issues. He was also recognized as a columnist and for his contentious relationship with the newspaper La Nación.

In 2017, Castro launched his presidential campaign presenting himself as a political outsider and emphasizing an anti-establishment and anti-corruption message. His rhetoric, which included promises to "govern by decree" and adopt a "firm hand" approach to crime and governance, was considered unusually confrontational within the traditionally centrist context of Costa Rican politics. During the campaign, some commentators compared Castro to figures such as Donald Trump, Marine Le Pen, and Rodrigo Duterte, and described his discourse as right-wing populist or far-right in orientation. Castro rejected these characterizations.

Even before formally securing a party nomination, Castro appeared near the top of opinion polls. Because Costa Rican law does not permit independent candidacies, he eventually ran under the banner of the National Integration Party (PIN). After officially launching his campaign, he rose from third to second place in several polls, surpassing Rodolfo Piza Rocafort and at times appearing tied with or ahead of Antonio Álvarez Desanti of the National Liberation Party.

Despite leading or remaining competitive in many polls during most of the campaign, Castro's support declined sharply in the final weeks following an advisory opinion issued by the Inter-American Court of Human Rights on same-sex marriage, which significantly reshaped the electoral debate. In the presidential election held on 4 February 2018, Castro finished in fifth place with 9.56% of the vote and did not qualify for the runoff election. Following tensions with longtime PIN chairman and deputy-elect Wálter Muñoz Céspedes, Castro ended his association with the party. He later attempted unsuccessfully to found a new national political party, but abandoned the effort citing logistical difficulties.

After an unfriendly separation from the National Integration Party, following tensions with its longtime chairman and deputy-elect Wálter Muñoz Céspedes, Castro tried unsuccessfully to create a new political party, but he abandoned the process due to "logistical difficulties".

== Controversies ==
=== Antisemitism allegations ===
In an editorial published on 30 July 2019, the newspaper La Nación, a frequent critic of Castro, accused him of antisemitism over comments made in one of his videos directed at businessman and former finance minister Leonel Baruch, owner of the media outlet CRHoy and a member of the Jewish community. Castro's remarks reportedly included references to the Holocaust and descriptions of Baruch as an "evil banker." The comments were condemned by the Costa Rican Jewish community through an official statement issued by the Zionist Israelite Center. Israel's ambassador to Costa Rica, Amir Ofek, also criticized the remarks, describing them as "miserable expressions."

Leaders of several parliamentary caucuses in the Legislative Assembly of Costa Rica, including those of the National Liberation Party, Citizen's Action Party, Social Christian Unity Party, Broad Front, and Castro's former party, the National Integration Party, publicly repudiated the statements. The caucuses of the evangelical parties New Republic and National Restoration declined to comment. Independent deputy Erick Rodríguez Steller, who had originally been elected under the PIN banner and was politically close to Castro, defended him by arguing that the remarks had been taken out of context.

=== Homophobic statement ===
Castro described the government of President of Costa Rica Carlos Alvarado (who is a known supporter of LGBT rights) as maricón, a derogative Spanish term for homosexuals, after Alvarado's participation in that year's Gay Parade.

=== Conflict with reporters and the media ===
During the 2018 presidential campaign, Castro was involved in several public disputes with journalists and media organizations.

On 24 November 2017, journalist Arlene Raventós, then employed by the television network Repretel, publicly rejected accusations made by Castro that she had participated in a campaign to discredit him. Raventós stated that the allegations were false and criticized the spread of unfounded claims during the electoral campaign. On 1 December 2017, journalist David Delgado, who had worked for La Nación and the Ministry of Justice and Peace, publicly accused Castro of "persecution, mockery and harassment" in relation to coverage of a drug trafficking case.

On 11 December 2017, Castro announced legal action against the University of Costa Rica over content broadcast on the student-produced program Suave un toque, which discussed allegations that Castro had assaulted his late mother, examined his political career, and criticized what the program described as his "right-wing populist" tendencies. Castro described the content as unacceptable and defamatory.

The dispute later proceeded to court. In 2019, former program host Claudia Campos and UCR Channel director Marlon Mora were sued by Castro. Proceedings began in November 2020. During one hearing, Castro reportedly directed hostile remarks at Campos's defense lawyer, referencing previous disputes between them. The case was initially dismissed after neither Castro nor his legal representatives appeared at scheduled hearings and failed to provide sufficient justification for their absence. Castro was ordered to pay court costs. In January 2023, a new trial began against Mora. During the proceedings, Campos stated that any wrongdoing had been unintentional and publicly apologized to Castro, who accepted the apology and continued the case only against Mora. In March 2023, a court found Mora guilty on two counts of defamation and ordered him to pay fines and compensation, as well as legal costs. However, in February 2024, an appeals court overturned the conviction, and the legal dispute remained unresolved.

==== Panama Papers ====
Castro was mentioned as part of the Panama Papers case by the news reports Amelia Rueda and Semanario Universidad for being lawyer for a Mossack Fonseca law firm related company, which led him to attack Rueda and her son Antonio Jiménez, as well as the media Semanario.
