= 2017 Social Christian Unity Party presidential primary =

Costa Rican primary election

Social Christian Unity Party presidential primary, 2017
← 2013	June 4, 2017	2021 →
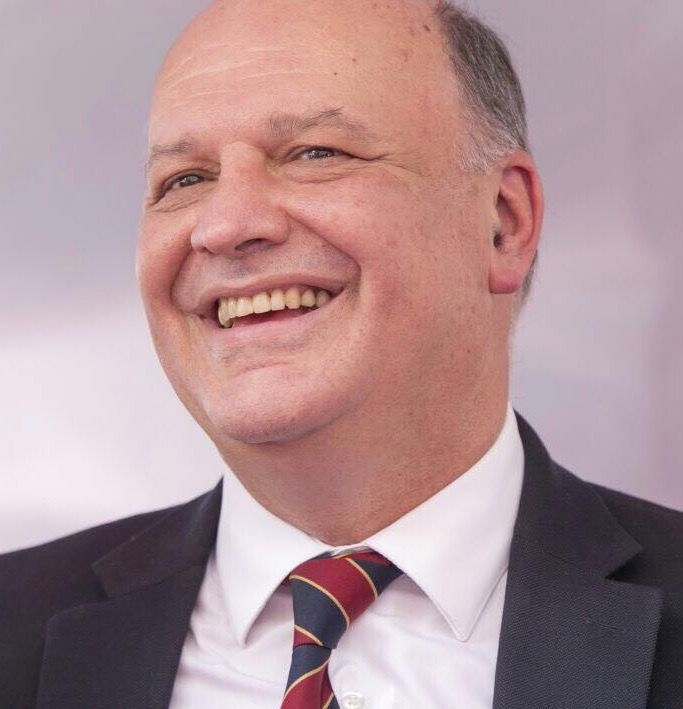
Nominee	Rodolfo Piza	Rafael Ortiz
Party	PUSC	PUSC
Popular vote	83,100	30,573
Percentage	69%	24%
Previous Presidential Candidate
Rodolfo Piza
PUSC
Presidential Candidate
Rodolfo Piza
PUSC

The Social Christian Unity Party (PUSC) presidential primary of 2017 or Social Christian National Convention as is known in Spanish was an electoral process for the selection of the party's presidential candidate for the 2018 Costa Rican general election and was scheduled for June 4, 2017.

The two main pre-candidates were previous presidential candidate, former PUSC's Secretary General and president of the Costa Rican Department of Social Security Rodolfo Piza, and then deputy, former President of Congress and former president of Liga Deportiva Alajuelense football team Rafael Ortiz.

== Candidates ==
Piza, a lawyer and businessman, was PUSC's candidate on the 2014 election ironically after losing the election to the winner of the previous primary, physician Rodolfo Hernández, due to Hernandez’ resignation as candidate motivated by internal party fighting. Hernández selected Piza as his running mate and Piza took over the nomination once Hernández left.

Piza is generally seen as part of the Liberal faction inside PUSC, a more right-wing fiscally conservative and socially liberal faction led by former president Miguel Angel Rodríguez, in favor of small government and lower taxes. Whilst Ortiz on the contrary claims to be representative of the traditional Calderonista faction, a more left-wing Social-Christian pro-Welfare State and more socially conservative faction inspired by Rafael Angel Calderón Guardia's Social Reform. Ortiz also has the support of former president Abel Pacheco, whilst the only other former president from PUSC, Rafael Angel Calderón Fournier (Guardia's son) left PUSC altogether and formed his own new party with Hernández as candidate.

Piza has the support of most of PUSC's parliamentary faction, except for two deputies (Humberto Vargas and Jorge Rodríguez, both of them endorsed Ortiz) and two former ministers; Esmeralda Britton and Patricia Vega, and of course of Rodríguez.

== Contested candidates ==
Two more figures tried to be candidates; former president of the Costa Rican Railroad Institute Miguel Carabaguíaz and pro-marijuana activist Gerald Murray. Both were denied participation due to not having the minimal time of membership (two years) in the party (Carabaguíaz was member, for a while, of Calderón Fournier's party but resigned after Hernández was selected candidate instead of him and Murray is a newcomer). Carabaguíaz did not appeal PUSC's decision but Murray did, presenting an appeal into Costa Rica's Tribunal Supremo de Elecciones that was rejected.

== Costs ==
The cost for inscription as pre-candidate was 40 million colones. A sum that was appealed by all pre-candidates except Piza arguing it was disproportionate, especially as other major parties like National Liberation and Citizens' Action had much lesser amounts for their respective primaries. Carabaguiz and Murray did not paid as their candidacies were denied. The Electoral Court did reduce the amount to 35 million.

== Opinion polls ==
Date	Source	Miguel Carabaguiaz	Rafael Ortiz	Rodolfo Piza	Gerald Murray	None
September–October, 2016 (Nationwide)	Diario Extra	7%	9%	34%	-	-
September–October, 2016 (Party membership)	Diario Extra	7%	12%	53%	-	-
February, 2017 (Nationwide)	OPol Consultores	2%	8,3%	38,3%	2%	49,4%

== See also ==
- National Liberation Party presidential primary, 2017
- Citizens' Action Party presidential primary, 2017
