= 2021 Social Christian Unity Party presidential primary =

Costa Rican primary election

- 27 June 2021
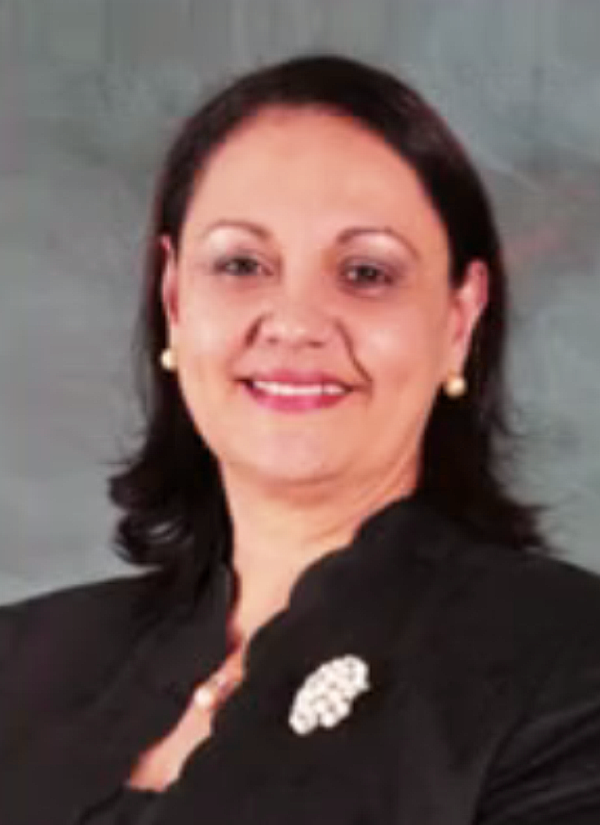

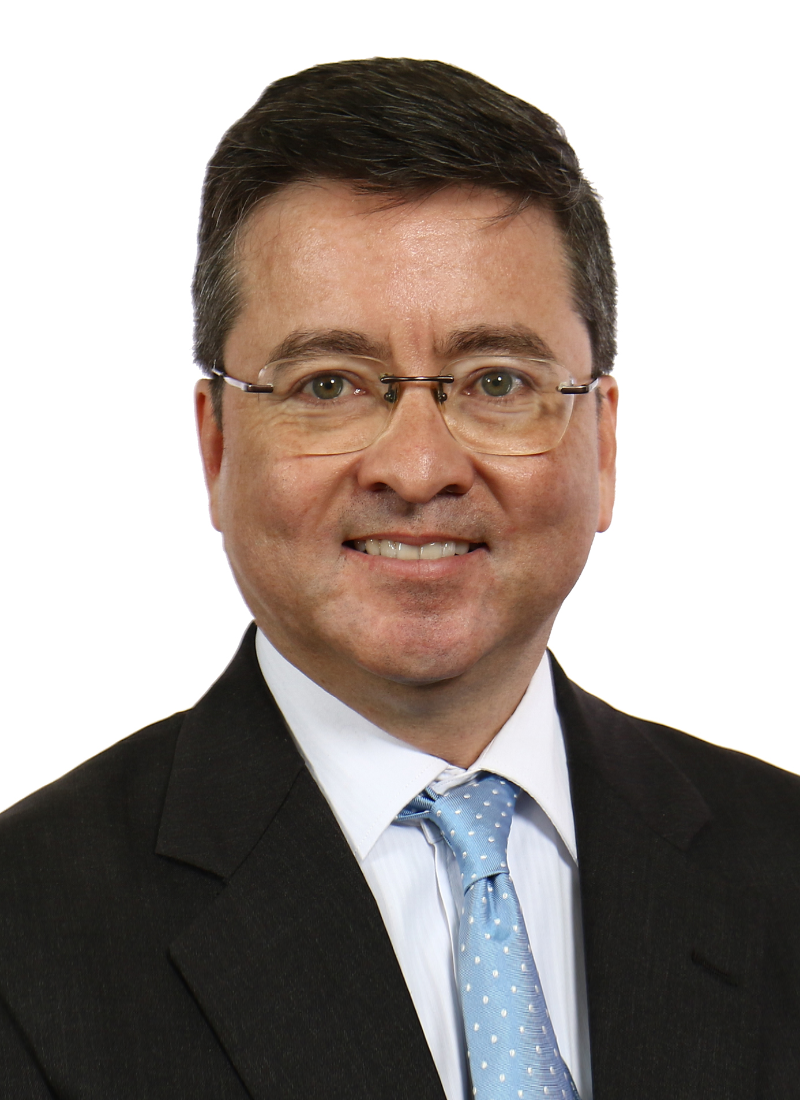

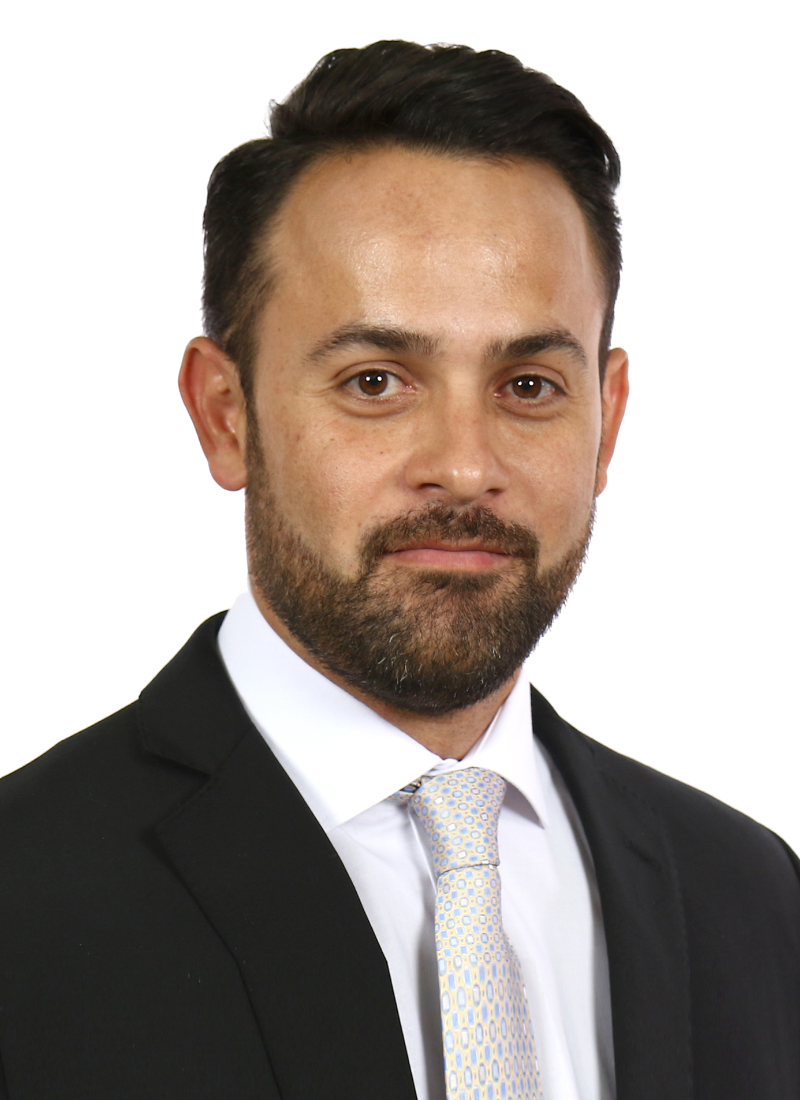
Nominee	Lineth Saborío Chaverri	Pedro Muñoz Fonseca	Erwen Masís Castro
Popular vote	68,000	27,800	27,300
Percentage	55.21%	22.57%	22.17%
Previous Presidential nominee
Rodolfo Piza
PUSC
Presidential nominee
Lineth Saborío Chaverri
PUSC

The 2021 Social Christian Unity Party presidential primary, also known as the Social Christian National Convention, was the primary election process by which supporters of the Social Christian Unity Party selected their presidential candidate for the 2022 general elections. Former Vice-president during the Pacheco administration Linneth Saborío won the election over her two rivals, lawmakers Muñoz and Masís.

Former Vice President Linneth Saborío was elected with 60% of the votes, followed by deputy Pedro Muñoz with 21% and Erwen Masis with 19%.

== History ==
Pedro Múñoz, deputy, and lawyer Roberto Suñol were initially confirmed. Former pre-candidate Rafael Ortiz Fábrega is in a diplomatic posts abroad. In December 2020, several representatives of the party faction known as "Unity People" sent a letter to former president Rafael Ángel Calderón Fournier, with the purpose of talking about establishing a coalition with his current party, the Social Christian Republican Party and other ideologically similar parties for the 2022 election. Former President Miguel Ángel Rodríguez Echeverría, who is still a PUSC member supported the idea of a PUSC-led coalition, yet said proposal was denied by the party's Executive President, Randall Quirós Bustamante, allegedly due to lack of time.

On February 7, 2021, the party's National Assembly voted 56-32 against Former President Rodriguez Echeverría's motion for an electoral coalition led by the Social Christian Unity Party and with the participation of "Social Christian, Conservative, Liberal, and Evangelical political groups."

=== Registered candidates ===
Name	Birth	Previous offices	Home province	Campaign Start date	References
Erwen Masís Castro	14 March 1982 (44); Alajuela, Alajuela	Alajuela Deputy (2018-present); Mayor of San Mateo (2007-2011)	Alajuela	Campaign Announce: 15 March 2021	
Lineth Saborío Chaverri	4 November 1960 (65); Grecia, Grecia	Vice President of Costa Rica (2002-2006); Minister of the Presidency (2004-2006); Minister of Planning (2003-2004); Director Organismo de Investigación Judicial (1997-2002)	San José	Campaign Announce and Start: 4 April 2021	
Pedro Muñoz Fonseca	31 July 1968 (58); Liberia, Liberia	San José Deputy (2018-presente); President of Social Christian Unity Party (2014-2018); Alderman at Liberia Municipal Council (2006-2010)	San José	Campaign Announce: 9 February 2021; Start: 17 March 2021	

=== Retired ===
As of April 2021, the following people had publicly expressed interest about potentially pursuing candidacy but retired from the race:

- Juan José Vargas Fallas, Homeland First Party's presidential candidate in 2006, Former Deputy originally elected under PAC's list, then independent (2002-2006) from San José
- Roberto Suñol Prego, Vicepresidential nominee in 2018, precandidate in 2014

=== Declined to be candidate ===
- Rodolfo Méndez Mata, Minister of Public Works and Transport (1978-1980; 1998-2000; 2018-present day), precandidate in 1982 and 2002.
- Rodolfo Piza Rocafort, Minister of the Presidency (2018-2019), presidential candidate 2014 and 2018.
