= 2013 Social Christian Unity Party presidential primary =

Costa Rican primary election

Social Christian Unity Party presidential primary, 2013
← 2001	May 9, 2013	2017 →
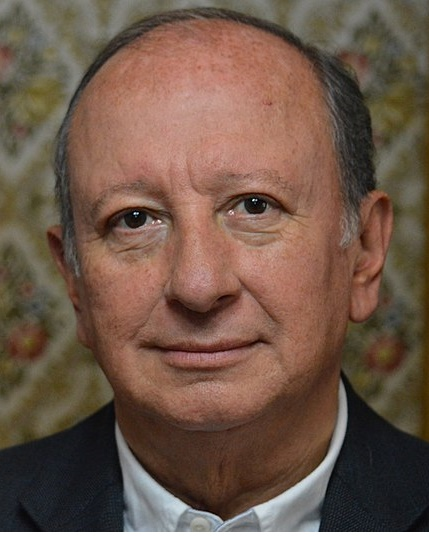

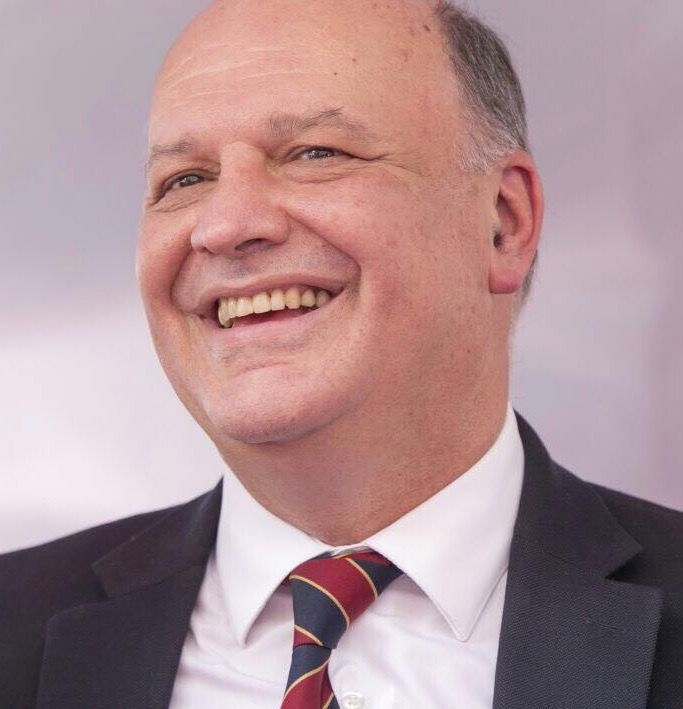
Nominee	Rodolfo Hernández	Rodolfo Piza
Party	PUSC	PUSC
Percentage	77%	23%
Previous Presidential Candidate
Luis Fishman
Presidential Candidate
Rodolfo Hernández

The 2013 presidential primary of the Social Christian Unity Party of Costa Rica was held on May 9, 2013, as part of the 2014 Costa Rican general election. The two main traditional factions of PUSC (Calderonistas and Liberals) competed for the nomination. The competing parties were Costa Rica's Children's Hospital Dr. Rodolfo Hernández, and the lawyer, businessman, and former president of the Costa Rican Social Security Fund Rodolfo Piza. This was PUSC's fifth primary election in its history and the first in twelve years.

Hernández was nominated by the group “Calderonista Convergence”, close to former president Rafael Ángel Calderón Fournier who personally endorsed Hernández and followed the “Calderonism” (the historical ideology of 40's caudillo and Fournier's father Rafael Ángel Calderón Guardia, a Christian socialist) whilst Piza was endorsed by the Social Christian Rebirth group, part of the more right-wing Liberal faction led by former president (and Fournier's rival) Miguel Ángel Rodríguez Echeverría. On this election Piza had the support of Dr. Abel Pacheco's faction including Pacheco himself and his prime minister Ricardo Toledo.

Hernández won the primary by a landslide victory with 77% of the votes and nominates Piza as his Vice-president. Nevertheless, Hernández would resign his candidacy a few months later accusing the Party's leadership of treacheries and backstabbing. Piza took over the candidacy reaching only 6% of popular vote on the presidential ballot, but increasing its support for Congress to the point of duplicating its number of deputies.

== See also ==
- 2014 Costa Rican general election
- Citizens' Action Party presidential primary, 2013
