= 2001 National Liberation Party presidential primary =

Costa Rican primary election

National Liberation Party presidential primary, 2001
← 1997	June 3, 2001	2009 →
- Turnout: 250.000
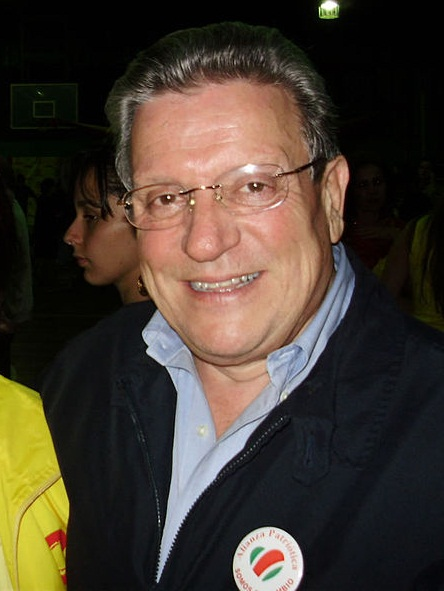

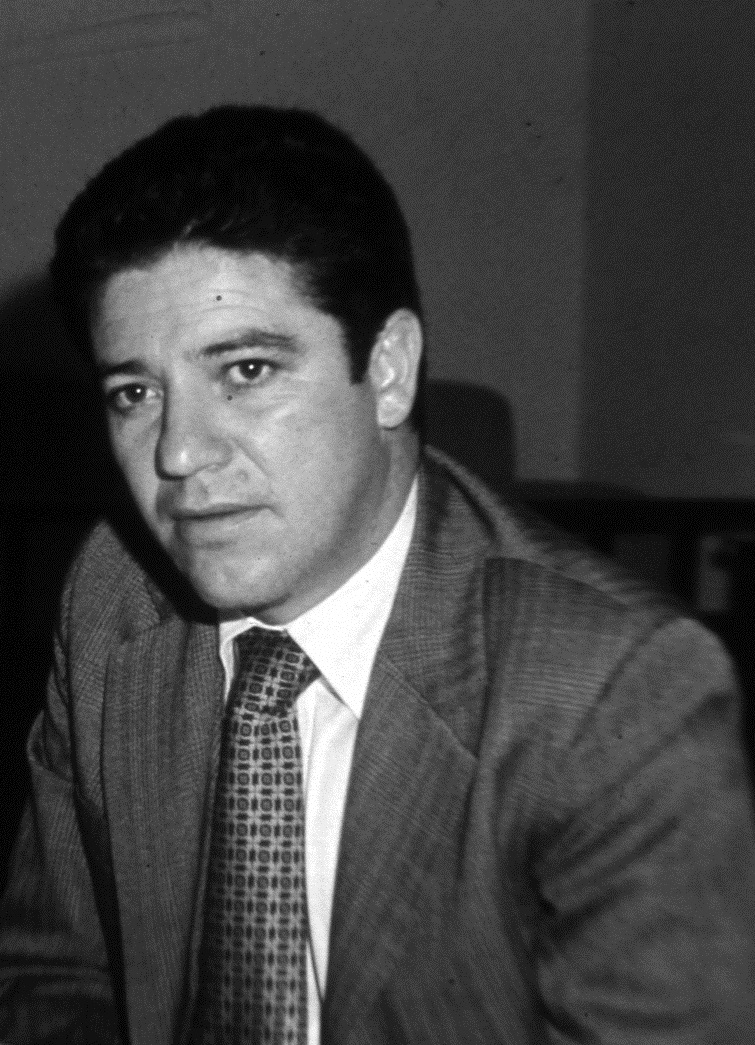

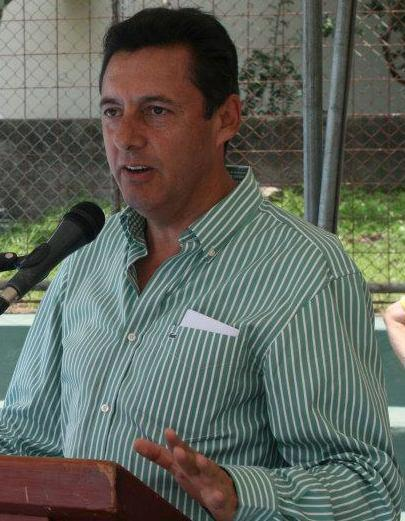
Nominee	Rolando Araya	José Miguel Corrales	Antonio Álvarez Desanti
Party	PLN	PLN	PLN
Percentage	51.89	28.77	14.51
Previous Presidential Candidate
José Miguel Corrales
Presidential Candidate
Rolando Araya

A primary election was held among the members of Costa Rica’s National Liberation Party (PLN) on June 3, 2001 in order to choose PLN’s nominee for presidency in the 2002 general election. PLN was then the main opposition party facing then in government Social Christian Unity Party. This, as was common since the 70s, was an open primary and as such all Costa Ricans could vote in it with the only requirement be signing membership of the party moments before entering the polls.

Previous candidate José Miguel Corrales who ran as PLN’s nominee in the 1998 election (losing to PUSC’s candidate Miguel Ángel Rodríguez) tried to be nominated again. His main rivals were former party’s president Rolando Araya Monge (nephew of ex president Luis Alberto Monge) and former minister Antonio Álvarez Desanti, the younger of the candidates. Araya won the nomination with 51% of the votes. A noticeable affected José Miguel Corrales acknowledged the defeat and announce his resignation to future attempts for presidency, while on the contrary Desanti also acknowledged the results but also that he will try to be nominated in coming elections. Araya lost the presidential race against PUSC candidate Abel Pacheco.

== See also ==
- 2002 Costa Rican general election
- Social Christian Unity Party presidential primary, 2001
