= 2017 National Liberation Party presidential primary =

Costa Rican primary election

National Liberation Party presidential primary, 2017
- April 2, 2017
- Turnout: 431,438
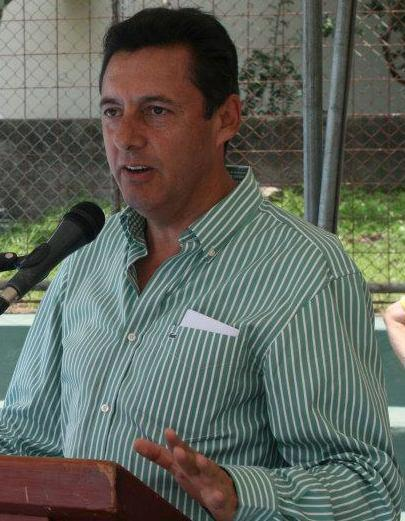

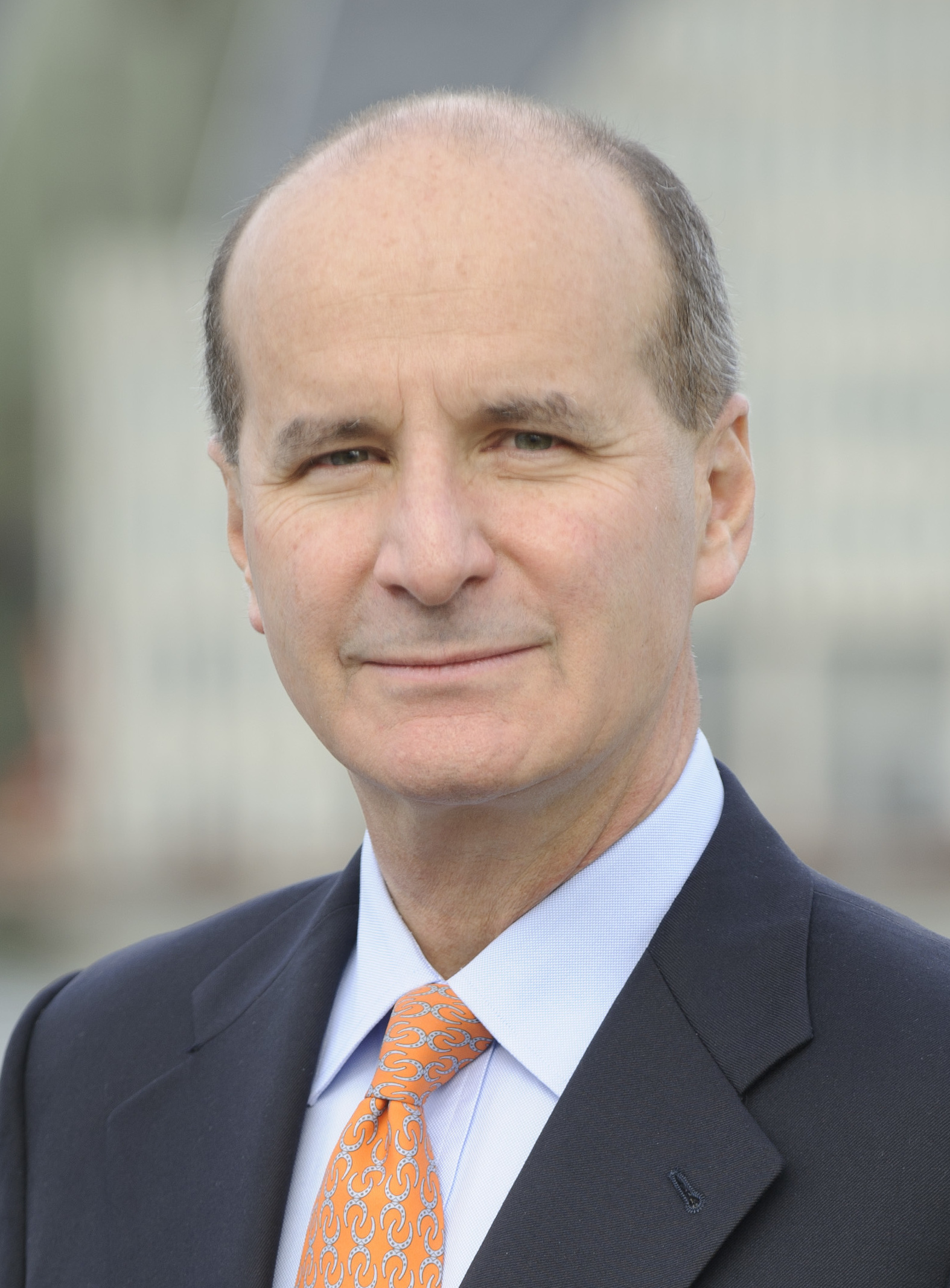

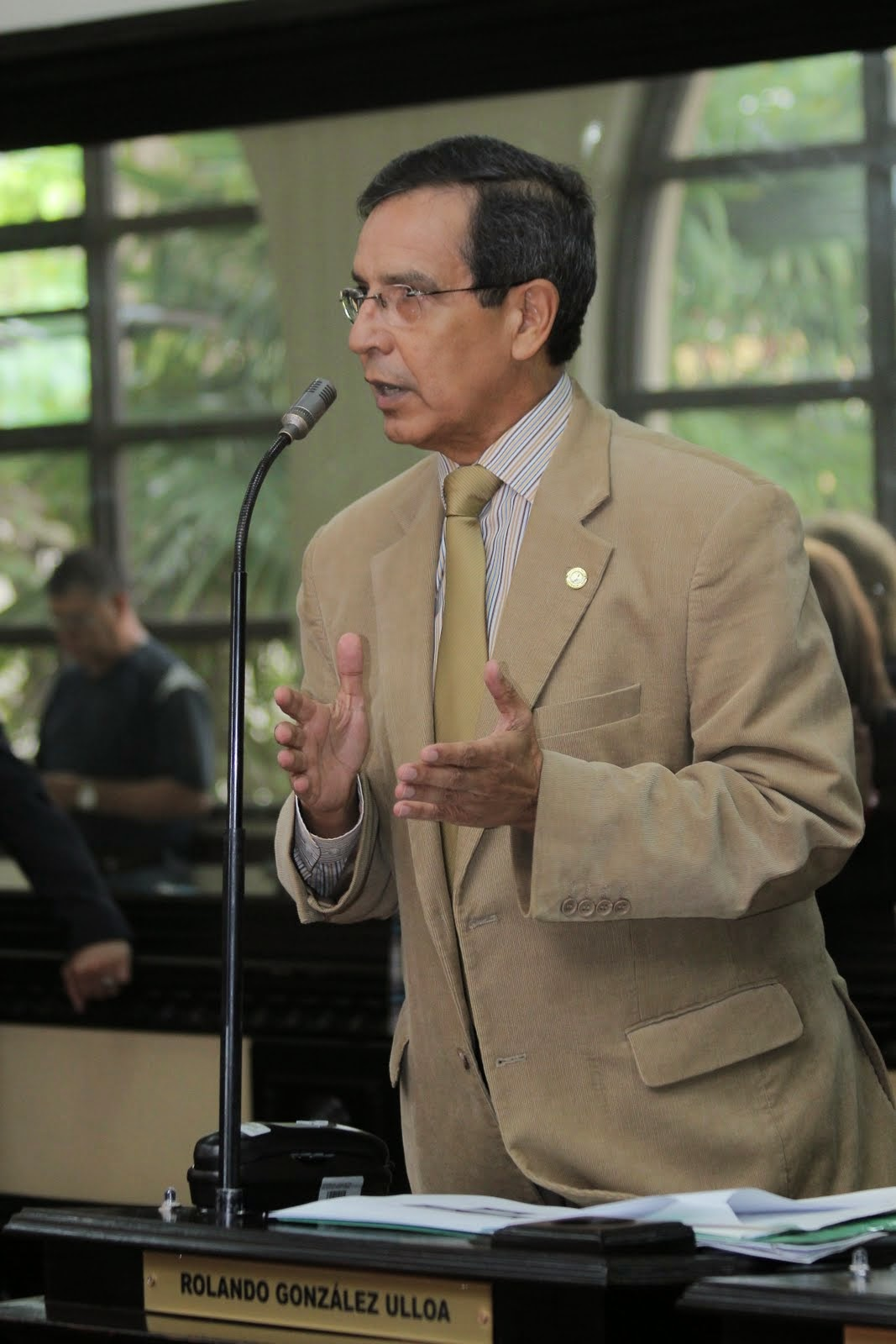

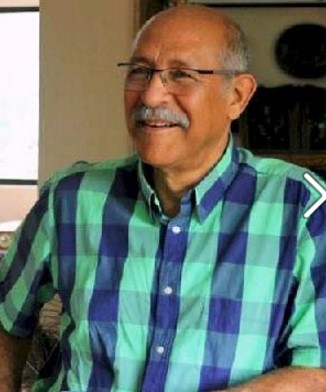
Nominee	Antonio Álvarez Desanti	José María Figueres Olsen
Party	PLN	PLN
Alliance	Arism, Arayism	Figuerism
Popular vote	191,217	154,830
Percentage	45.56%	37.91%
Nominee	Rodolfo González Ulloa	Sigifredo Aiza Campos
Party	PLN	PLN
Alliance	Independent	Independent
Popular vote	38,526	32,310
Percentage	9.49%	7.03%
Previous Presidential Candidate
Johnny Araya
Presidential Candidate
Antonio Álvarez Desanti

Costa Rica's National Liberation Party presidential primary (or Convención Nacional “National Convention”) was a primary election programmed for April 2, 2017 in order to choose the party's presidential nominee for the 2018 Costa Rican general election. PLN was then the main opposition party to Luis Guillermo Solís' government.

After rumors of former president and Nobel Prize laureate Oscar Arias running for re-election, Arias made public during a television chain on September 19, 2016, that he would not run for the presidency again expecting to promote new and younger leaderships. Former president José María Figueres, on the other hand, made official his intentions to be nominated. This despite ethical questionings about the ICE-Alcatel corruption scandal he was involved in during his previous presidency.

President of Congress and former minister Antonio Alvarez Desanti quickly followed him announcing his candidacy on November 10. Desanti was endorsed by Arias himself, his brother Rodrigo and for San José Mayor and previous PLN nominee Johnny Araya. Desanti's presidential aspirations are not new, as he already tried to be candidate in the 2001 presidential primary, losing to Rolando Araya, and also was candidate by his self-made party Union for Change in the 2006 general election.

Other minor candidates also appeared, including former deputy for Limon Clinton Cruickshank and private lawyer Enrique Franco, but both of them withdraw from the race arguing lack of funds. Other candidates like then deputy and radio host Rodolfo Gonzalez and former deputy and physician Sigifredo Aiza did continue their campaign.

== Results ==
Voter's turnout was 431 438, a considerably lesser amount than in the last primary (550.000). The first results showed Desanti ahead with 45% of votes, followed by Figueres. González and Aiza acknowledge the results immediately. Surprisingly the Party's Electoral Tribunal suspended the airing of results at midnight claiming that the counting will continue in the morning. At the same time Figueres and Desanti had a heated discussion on national television as Figueres claimed that data from his campaign show him as the winner and that such result will be "cleared in the morning". Desanti then warned that Figueres' campaign could attempt voters' fraud. The next morning around noon Figueres did recognize defeat and congratulates Desanti who claimed victory.

Popular Vote
Antonio Álvarez	45.56%
José María Figueres	37.91%
Rodolfo González	9.49%
Sigifredo Aiza	7.03%

== Controversies ==
During one of the debates organized by the State's network Channel 13 the candidates, unaware that the microphones were already open, discuss the subjects of the debate. Desanti suggest attacking PAC (governing party and PLN’s main rival) to what Figueres agrees, whilst Aiza admits that the government “is not that bad”.

== Opinion polls ==
Date	Source	Antonio Álvarez Desanti	José María Figueres	Rolando González	Sigifredo Aiza	None
September–October, 2016	Enfoques de Opinión	15%	38%	-	8%	-
November, 2016	Cid Gallup	35%	44%	-	-	18%
November, 2016	Cid Gallup	-	23%	15%	-	59%
November, 2016 (Party members, without Desanti)	Cid Gallup	-	49%	12%	-	32%
February, 2017	OPol Consultores	42%	26%	3%	2%	27%
March, 2017	Demoscopia	45,4%	19,8%	6%	3,1%	-

== See also ==
- Citizens' Action Party presidential primary, 2017
- Social Christian Unity Party presidential primary, 2017
