= 2001 Social Christian Unity Party presidential primary =

Costa Rican primary election

Social Christian Unity Party presidential primary, 2001
- June 10, 2001
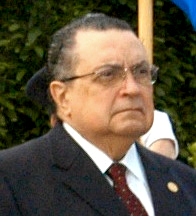

Nominee	Abel Pacheco	Rodolfo Méndez
Party	PUSC	PUSC
Percentage	76%	24%
Previous Presidential Candidate
Miguel Rodríguez
Presidential Candidate
Abel Pacheco

The 2001 presidential primary of the Social Christian Unity Party of Costa Rica was held on June 10, 2001, as part of the 2002 Costa Rican general election.

Former Minister of Public Works and Transport Rodolfo Méndez Mata faced Television personality and Congressman Dr. Abel Pacheco de la Espriella. Méndez had the endorsement of Rafael Ángel Calderón Fournier, former president and PUSC's historical and most emblematic leader. With PUSC's National Committee conformed by Calderon's supporters, Pacheco was perceived as "the underdog" with the Party's structure and the overwhelming Calderonista grassroots in favor of Méndez. Nevertheless, Pacheco won against all odds on what was described as the beginning of the breaking of Costa Rica's two-party system sustained on political tradition and caudillos' endorsements. Pacheco would also win the presidency in the 2002 race against other candidates like National Liberation's Rolando Araya and Citizens' Action Ottón Solís.

== See also ==
- 2002 Costa Rican general election
- National Liberation Party presidential primary, 2001
