= Pedro Muñoz (Costa Rican politician) =

Costa Rican politician (born 1968)

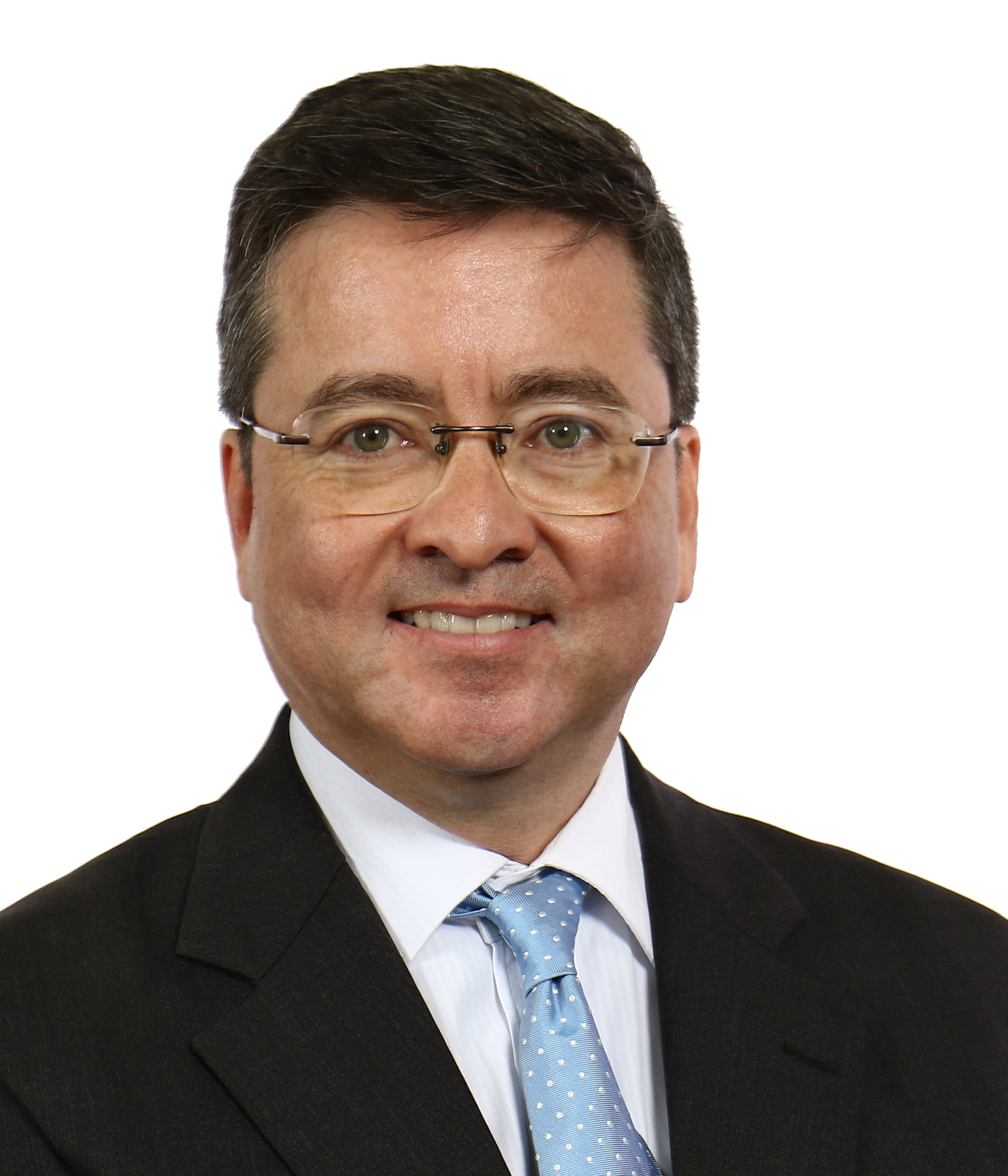
- Official portrait, 2018

Deputy of the Legislative Assembly of Costa Rica
- In office 1 May 2018 – 30 April 2022
- Preceded by: Rosibel Ramos Madrigal
- Succeeded by: Ariel Robles Barrantes
- Constituency: San José (18th Office)

President of the Social Christian Unity Party
- In office 6 July 2014 – 19 August 2018
- Preceded by: Gerardo Vargas Rojas
- Succeeded by: Randall Quirós Bustamante

Councillor of the Municipality of Liberia
- In office 1 May 2006 – 30 April 2010

Personal details
- Born: Pedro Miguel Muñoz Fonseca; 31 July 1968 (age 57) Liberia, Costa Rica
- Party: Social Christian Unity Party
- Education: University of Costa Rica; Tufts University
- Occupation: Lawyer, businessperson and politician.

Pedro Miguel Muñoz Fonseca (born 31 July 1968) is a Costa Rican lawyer, businessman and politician. He served as president of the Social Christian Unity Party from July 2014 to September 2018.

== Education ==
Muñoz attended elementary school at the Escuela de Aplicación Alba Ocampo Alvarado and high school at the Liceo Laboratorio in Liberia.

He obtained his law degree from the Faculty of Law of the University of Costa Rica, and a master's degree from the Fletcher School of Law and Diplomacy at Tufts University.

== Career ==
Muñoz served as an advisor to the Costa Rican Minister of Foreign Affairs and Human Rights in 1999.

He served as a substitute council member at the Municipality of Liberia, representing the Social Christian Unity Party (PUSC), from May 2006 to April 2010.

In 2012 he expressed his interest in becoming a candidate for the presidency of the PUSC. However, he withdrew in favor of Rodolfo Piza Rocafort.

He served as president of the PUSC from July 2014 to September 2018. During his term the party grew from 9 to 14 mayors and from 50 to 103 council members in the municipal elections of 2016, and from 8 to 9 legislative seats in the general elections of 2018. Moreover, the party's presidential votes increased from 6.5% to 16.05% in 2018.

He serves as a congressman for San José Province in the Legislative Assembly.

Muñoz is a founding partner of Dentons Muñoz where he acts as consultant.

== Personal life ==
Muñoz is married to Carolina Carazo and they have three children: Victoria, Antonio, and Ana.

He is the author of the book Dejemos Huella, Costa Rica Puede Más, published in 2015.
