= 2017 Citizens' Action Party presidential primary =

Costa Rican primary election

- 9 July 2017
- Turnout: 32,707
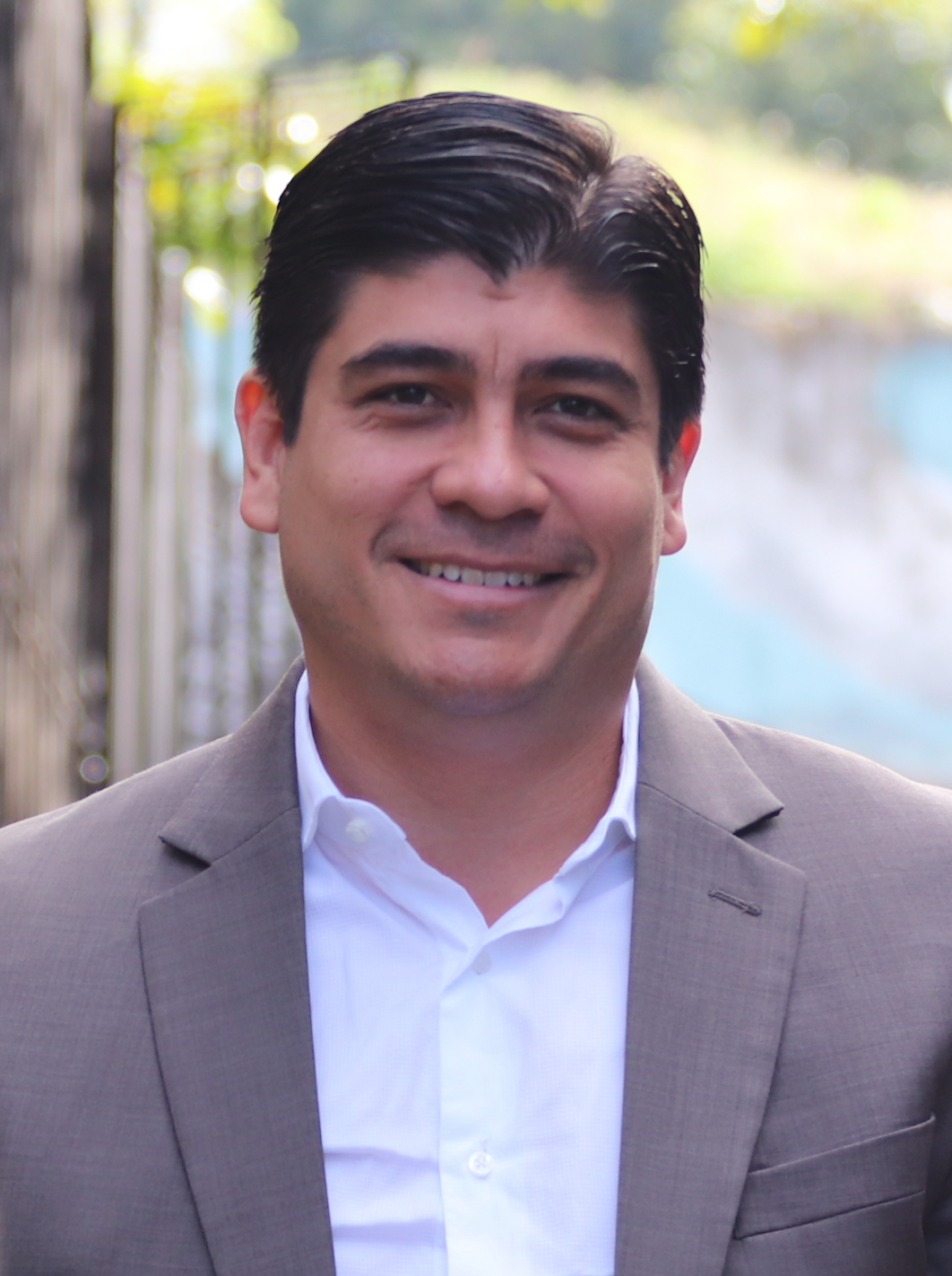

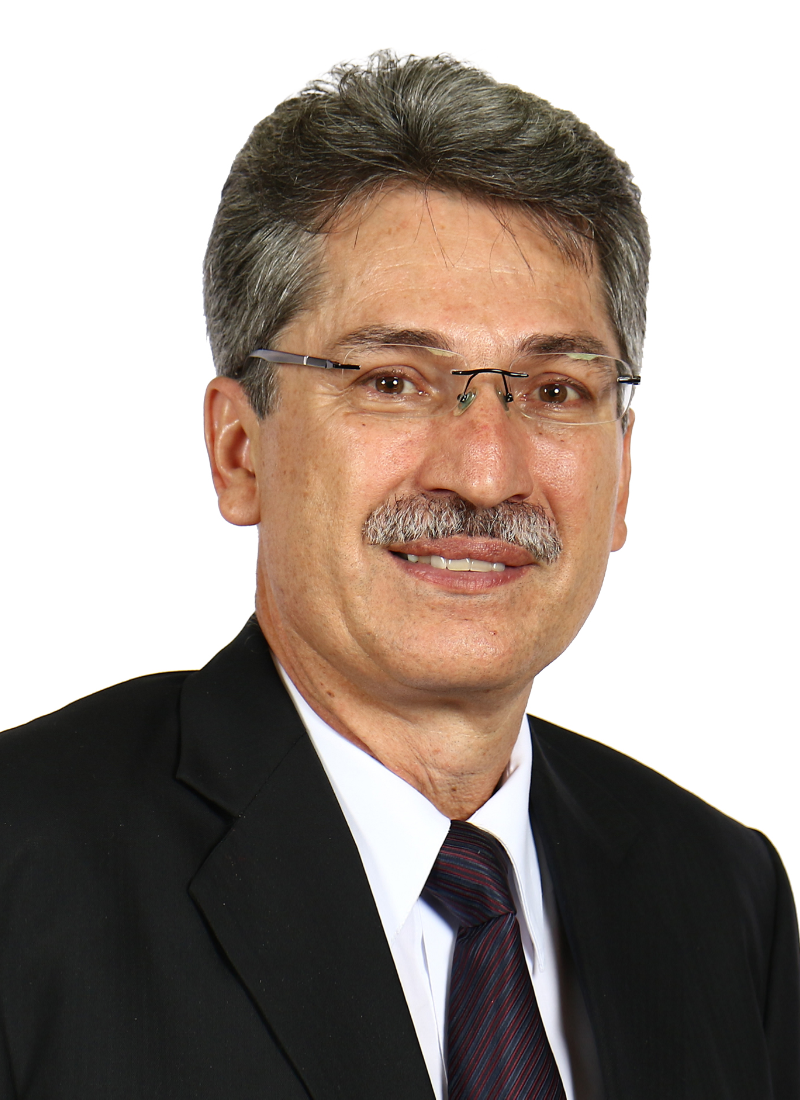
Nominee	Carlos Alvarado Quesada	Welmer Ramos González
Party	PAC	PAC
Popular vote	18,320	14,387
Percentage	56.01%	43.99%
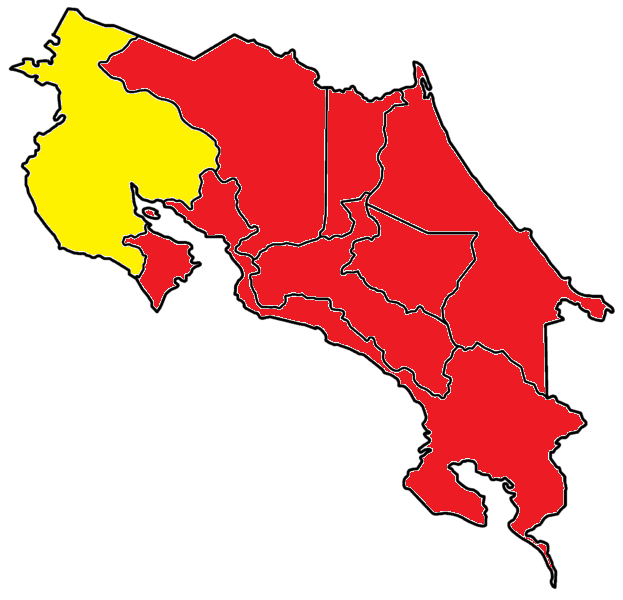
- Most voted candidate by province: Ramos Alvarado
Previous Presidential Candidate
Luis Guillermo Solís
PAC
Presidential Candidate
Carlos Alvarado
PAC

The third primary election of the Citizens' Action Party (PAC, known as Convención Nacional Ciudadana or "Citizens' National Convention") was scheduled for July 9, 2017 in order to elect PAC's presidential candidate for the 2018 Costa Rican general election. Albeit rumors about possible candidates included former candidate and former deputy Ottón Solís, then Vice-President Ana Helena Chacón and former president of Congress and then UN ambassador Juan Carlos Mendoza, all of them denied having aspirations at the moment. Instead, the first announcing his intention to be nominated was Minister Carlos Alvarado, former Minister of Social Issues and President of the Joint Social Welfare Institute and latter Minister of Labor under Luis Guillermo Solis' presidency. He was quickly followed by Economy Minister Welmer Ramos, both resigning their offices as the Constitution requires before February 2017. Congresswoman and former pre-candidate Epsy Campbell made her intentions public on March of the same year in what could have been Campbell's third attempt to be presidential nominee. But on March 27 Campbell withdraw from the race.

Alvarado, a published writer and journalist, is seen as close to Luis Guillermo Solís Rivera, whilst Ramos (although also a Minister under Solís Rivera) is considered closer to the "Ottonista" faction, i.e. the more conservative faction close to the ideas of party's founder Ottón Solís. Alvarado won the election by 56% of the votes over Ramos who acknowledged the defeat the same night. Alvarado would win the presidential race a few months later.

== Opinion polls ==
Date	Source	Epsy Campbell Barr	Carlos Alvarado Quesada	Welmer Ramos González	Ottón Solís Fallas (non participant)
December, 2016	Opol Consultores	75%	-	-	51%
February, 2017	OPol Consultores	66%	37%	33%	44%
July, 2017	OPol Consultores	-	57,04%	42,95%	-

== Campaign ==
Alvarado focused his campaign highlighting the government's achievements, whilst Ramos distanced himself from the government and even made harsh criticism to several government officials for ethical reasons.

Alvarado and Ramos main difference was regarding social issues, as in economy and politics held similar views. Alvarado supports gay marriage whilst Ramos opposes. This caused controversy mostly among partisans as PAC has traditionally held culturally liberal views and policies. Whilst Alvarado took part (as in previous years) of Costa Rica's annual Gay Pride Parade, Ramos said in a radio interview that he regarded same-sex couples unnatural, yet in an official statement Ramos clarified his position saying that he respects the LGBT community and would not oppose any form of legislation that recognizes same-sex couples and would respect the Party's official position in the matter.

== Controversies ==
The main controversy was a religious pamphlet made by a Christian pastor supporting Ramos and calling Christians to vote for him. Costa Rica's electoral law forbids to use religion in any way during a political campaign, and of course internal criticism for what was considered a very conservative view in a generally liberal progressive party.

== Debates ==
As with all presidential primaries, debates were organized between the candidates in different radio shows, universities, forums and networks. The two more prevalent are organized by the two biggest networks: Teletica on July 5 and Repretel on July 6.

== See also ==
- National Liberation Party presidential primary, 2017
- Social Christian Unity Party presidential primary, 2017
