= José Miguel Corrales Bolaños =

Costa Rican politician

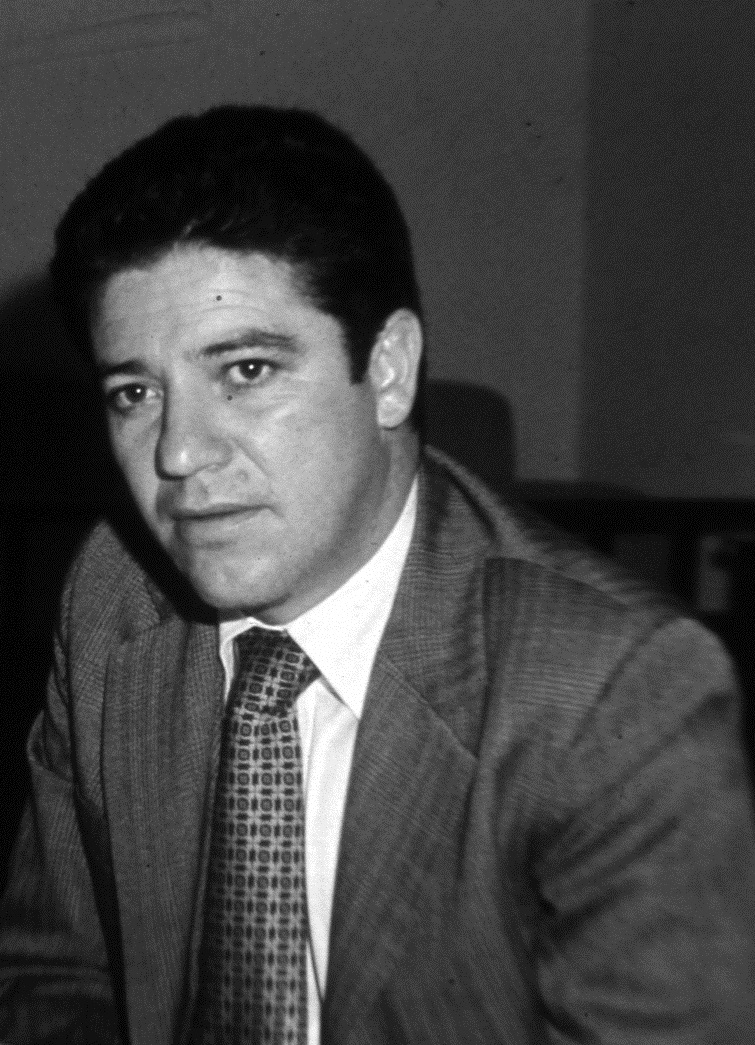
Official portrait

José Miguel Corrales Bolaños (born 29 September 1938) is a Costa Rican politician. he was the National Liberation Party candidate in the 1998 presidential election, and the New Motherland Party candidate in the 2014 presidential election. From 2005 to 2009 he was the President of Patriotic Union Party and tried to be its presidential candidate, but finally dropped to endorse Humberto Arce. In the 2010 and 2018 presidential elections, he endorsed National Integration Party candidates, but did not run as a candidate himself.
