= Welmer Ramos González =

Costa Rican economist and politician

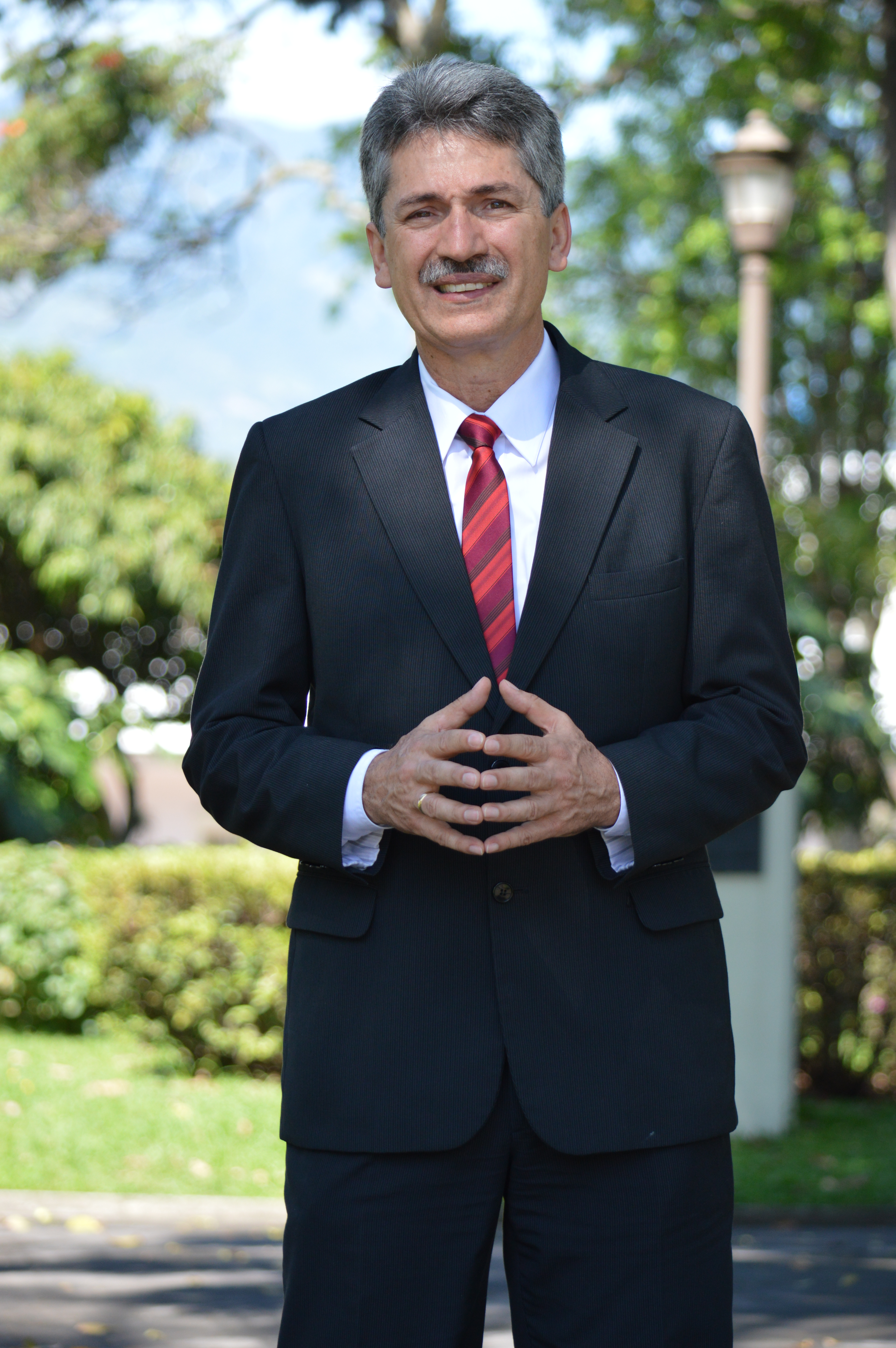
- Born: Jesús Welmer Ramos González; 13 January 1961 (age 64); Costa Rica
- Occupation(s): Economist, administrator, politician

Jesús Welmer Ramos González (born 13 January 1961) is a Costa Rican economist, administrator, and politician. He was the minister of economy, industry and commerce and president of the governing board of the Development Banking System between 2014 and 2017 in the Solís Rivera administration and national deputy during the 2018–2022 period.

Ramos obtained a bachelor's degree in economics from the Autonomous University of Central America and two master's degrees, one in business administration with an emphasis in finance from the Inter-American University of Costa Rica in 1992 and another in evaluation of programs and development projects from the University of Costa Rica in 2004.

Ramos was an economist for the Central Bank of Costa Rica between 1987 and 2006 in various positions, a parliamentary adviser between 2006 and 2014 for the legislative faction of the Citizens' Action Party and a postgraduate professor at the Fidelitas, Fundepos and Costa Rica universities. He was appointed minister of economy by President Luis Guillermo Solís, a position he held between May 1, 2014, and February 2, 2017, when he resigned to seek the presidential nomination from his party held at the National Citizen Convention 2017, but he lost the primary. He participated again in the National Citizen Convention 2021 and won the presidential nomination from his party on August 30, 2021.
