= Antonio Álvarez Desanti =

Costa Rican politician, lawyer and businessman

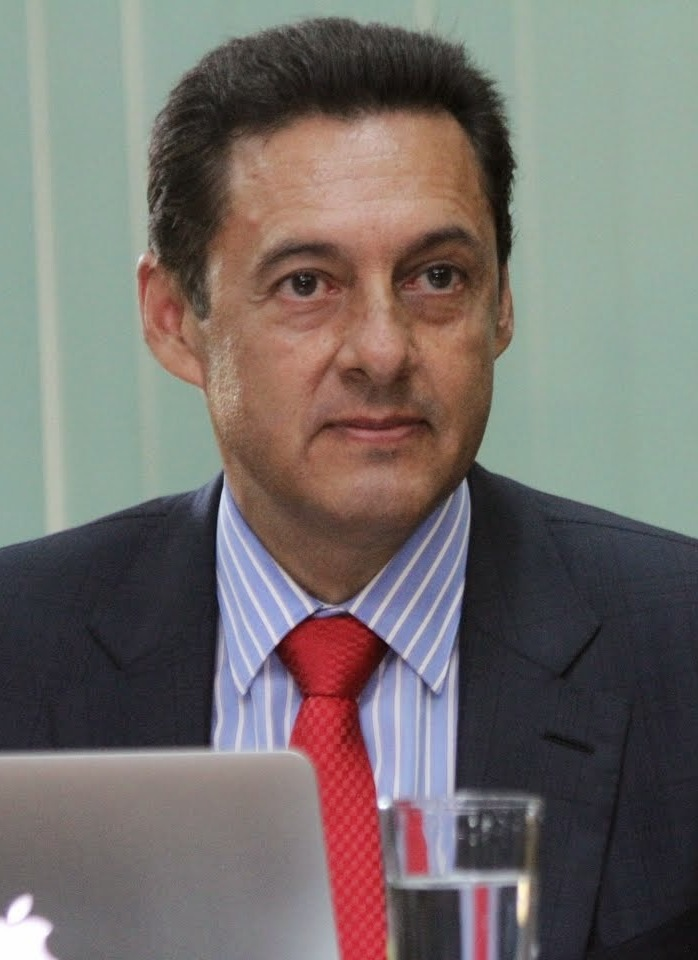
- Álvarez in 2014

37th & 54th President of the Legislative Assembly of Costa Rica
- In office 1 May 2014 – 30 April 2017
- Preceded by: Rafael Ortiz Fábrega
- Succeeded by: Gonzalo Ramírez Zamora
- In office 1 May 1995 – 30 April 1996
- Preceded by: Alberto Cañas Escalante
- Succeeded by: Jorge Walter Coto Molina

Deputy of the Legislative Assembly of Costa Rica
- In office 1 May 2014 – 1 May 2017
- Preceded by: Annie Alicia Saborío Mora
- Succeeded by: Maureen Fallas
- Constituency: San José (2nd Office)
- In office 1 May 1994 – 30 April 1998
- Preceded by: Juan José Trejos Fonseca
- Succeeded by: Luis Fishman Zonzinski
- Constituency: San José (18th Office)

Personal details
- Born: Antonio Álvarez Desanti; 6 July 1958 (age 68) San José, Costa Rica
- Party: National Liberation Party (1978–2005; since 2007)
- Other political affiliations: UPC (2005–2007)
- Education: University of Costa Rica; Harvard University

Antonio Álvarez Desanti (born 6 July 1958) is a Costa Rican politician, lawyer and businessman who has served twice as President of the Legislative Assembly (1995-1996 and 2016). He was National Liberation Party candidate for the 2018 Costa Rican general election.

== Early life and education ==
Antonio Álvarez Desanti was born in San José, Costa Rica on July 6, 1958. His father was Isaías Álvarez Alfaro and his mother was Dora Desanti Arce. He began his primary studies at Calasanz College.

He studied law at the University of Costa Rica. In 1981, he obtained a degree in law, and at the beginning of the 1990s he completed a master's degree in international tax law at Harvard University.

== Business career ==
In 1978, Desanti founded a small financial company and in 1980, a company dedicated to the planting of the peanut and to the process of packaging and distribution of the roasted product. This activity was then expanded to other related products, such as cashew seed. In 1981, he also dedicated himself to the production, sale and distribution of shoes in the national market.

== Political career ==
In 1979 Álvarez Desanti was elected Student Representative before the University Council and in 1980 was elected President of the Federation of Students of the University of Costa Rica (FEUCR).

In 1981 he is designated by the campaign of Luis Alberto Monge Alvarez like National Treasurer of the Liberationist Youth. In 1985, the then President of the Republic, Luis Alberto Monge appointed him President of Fertica; A state-owned fertilizer factory at the time.

In November he is named Executive President of the National Production Council, a position in which he continued during the administration of Óscar Arias Sánchez.

On May 1, 1987, Óscar Arias was appointed Minister of Agriculture and Livestock.

In 1988, he was appointed Minister of the Interior and Police, where CICAD (Joint Anti-Drug Intelligence Center) was created. In 1991 he assumes the deputy campaign of José María Figueres Olsen, who in 1994 was elected President of the Republic. During the period 1994-1998 Álvarez Desanti served as a deputy, and in 1995 he became President of the Legislative Assembly.

During his term as deputy, he elaborated and presented the "Law against sexual harassment in work and education", this being the first time that Costa Rica promulgates a law to prevent sexual harassment. It also promoted domestic violence laws, laws protecting people with disabilities, as well as protecting people with AIDS, legislation to regulate smoking. He also drafted and promoted a new tax law, aimed at an equitable distribution of wealth and the imposition of penalties on those who evade taxes.

At the National Liberationist Convention held on June 3, 2001, Álvarez Desanti ran as presidential candidate and was defeated by Rolando Araya Monge and José Miguel Corrales Bolaños, being the last of the three pre-candidates. For the elections of 2006 tried to face the precandidatura of Óscar Arias Sánchez, being defeated in the district assemblies.

Álvarez left the PLN and founded the Union For Change Party. Álvarez affirmed that the ruling corruption and the estrangement of the PLN leadership from its social democratic principles and ideology supported its decision. Union for Change obtained a 2.44% (39557 votes) in the elections of 2006 did not obtain deputies and achieved a single regidor at national level.

Antonio Álvarez assumed Johnny Araya's presidential campaign as chief in September 2012.

In 2008 he decided to dissolve his political movement and re-enter the ranks of the PLN. This decision was criticized, but Alvarez assured that there was a new social democratic and progressive base that allowed him to return, and that he aspired to be presidential candidate of that grouping. However, party's bylaws forbade anyone to be a candidate for not having four uninterrupted years of partisan militancy. Álvarez then gave his support to the candidacy of Laura Chinchilla, who was later elected President of the Republic.

On October 8, 2010, Álvarez Desanti informed the press of his decision to present his candidacy again in the National Liberation Party, with a view to the 2014 presidential elections. In September 2012, he gave up on them and joined Johnny Araya, then mayor of San José, as presidential candidate, where he served as Campaign Leader and deputy candidate for first place in San Jose's list, resulting in elect.

In January 2011, Álvarez Desanti launched a series of short television programs, in which he tackled issues such as animal rights, financial management, remote work, and social networks.

On September 20, 2016, Desanti announced through the 7 Days of Teletica program that he was seriously considering registering as a candidate for the National Liberation Party. On October 21, Diario Extra published the result of a national survey where Álvarez Desanti as the likely candidate with the highest support. On November 2, 2016, through the newspaper La Nación, Desanti stressed his interest in becoming the candidate for the National Liberation Party and stated that there will be a polarization between him and Jose María Figueres Olsen.

Alvarez registered his presidential precandidatura on January 10, 2017, counting on the support of several important public figures and liberationists. Later on Sunday, April 2 of the same year, his party's convention was celebrated, which would be victorious. The next day, his most important opponent, Jose Maria Figueres Olsen, would accept his defeat.

== Personal life ==
In 1977, Antonio Álvarez Desanti married Livia Meza, with whom four years later had his first daughter, Adriana, in May 1980. The union was dissolved a year later. In 1983, he married Nuria Marín Raventós, with whom he has a daughter, Andrea, born in 1986.
