= Mano Dura =

Policies in Latin American governments

Mano Dura (transl. 'Iron Fist') is a set of tough-on-crime policies put in place by Latin American governments in response to gang violence, organized crime, and insecurity. These policies were put in place in response to popular calls for the government to do something about the problem of rampant crime. Mano Dura policies have come under criticism due to human rights concerns.

== Policy ==
Gang violence became an increasingly difficult problem for El Salvador in the 1990s and early 2000s, in the wake of the country's civil war. During that war, hundreds of thousands of Salvadorans fled to the United States, many of them settling in Los Angeles. It was in southern California that the two largest Central American gangs, Mara Salvatrucha (MS-13) and Calle 18, were formed. After the end of the Salvadoran Civil War, the United States began deporting thousands of arrested gang members. This brought street gangs to El Salvador; the two gangs quickly became the largest criminal organizations in the country. The country's murder rate increased to 139 per 100,000 people in 1995, making El Salvador one of the most violent countries in the world.

In 2003, President Francisco Flores of the conservative Nationalist Republican Alliance (ARENA) unveiled the Plan Mano Dura to curb the power of the gangs and reduce the homicide rate. Intended to be a six-month emergency action, the policy involved increased police raids in gang-held areas, greater policing responsibilities for the military, and tougher sentences for suspected gang members. Additionally, the policy "permitted the arrest of suspected gang members on the basis of their physical appearance alone". In the first year after the policy was put in place, almost 20,000 suspected gang members, many of them young people, were arrested. Up to 91% of those detained were released without charge. In 2004, the Salvadoran Supreme Court of Justice declared the law to be unconstitutional. Despite this ruling, in 2006 President Antonio Saca of ARENA announced the implementation of Super Mano Dura ("Super Firm Hand"). This policy cemented the tough-on-crime approach of the Mano Dura policy and included a series of anti-gang legal reforms, including changes to the country's Penal Code.

These policies were largely kept in place when the leftist Farabundo Martí National Liberation Front (FMLN) won the presidency in 2009. In 2010, President Mauricio Funes responded to a series of attacks on bus passengers by suspected gang members by criminalizing gang affiliation and deploying 2,800 soldiers to assist the national police in fighting the gangs. The Anti-Gang Law of 2010 made "any legal act performed as part of a gang's criminal activity by its members or others on its behalf unlawful" and established a series of stiff penalties for gang-related crimes and activities, ranging from three to twenty years imprisonment. In addition to gang suppression, the Funes administration put in place a series of programs known as Mano Amiga ("Helping Hand"), which included "social prevention, law enforcement, rehabilitation, victim support, and institutional and legal reforms". These programs were praised for their timely interventions in communities previously neglected by the government, though were critiqued for being underfunded.

== Effects and controversy ==
One of the main effects of the Mano Dura policy was an increase in El Salvador's prison population. It is estimated that between 2004 and 2008, the number of incarcerated gang members doubled, increasing from 4,000 to 8,000. This has led to a major problem of prison overcrowding. According to El Salvador's director general of the prison system, as of September 2013 prison overcrowding was at 320 percent. This has led some prisons to be almost entirely controlled by gangs. Additionally, violence between MS-13 and Calle 18 gang members in prison forced the Salvadoran government to separate the gangs into different prisons. This has had a significant impact on how Salvadoran gangs operate. Placing gang leaders and large numbers of members together in prisons meant that gang leaders were often safer in jail than on the street. Access to cell phones has allowed gang members to run their operations from jail. In response to government policies, Salvadoran gangs have formed more hierarchical command structures, become more selective in choosing members, and instructed members to dress in a way that makes them less likely to be arrested by police.

Mano Dura met initial success in reducing the country's homicide rate, with a 14% drop in murders in 2004; however, that success was short-lived, as the murder rate increased to 64.7 per 100,000 people by 2006. Murder rates remained well above 2003 levels until 2012, when a truce was brokered between the MS-13 and Calle 18 gangs. Mano Dura has come under criticism both for its perceived failure at reducing violent crime in the country and over human-rights concerns. State security forces have at times been accused of committing extrajudicial killings of suspected gang members. The arbitrary nature of many arrests of gang members has also raised concerns. Furthermore, some critics have been unnerved by the use of the military in police operations, given the country's commitment to keep civilian and military affairs separate following its civil war. In 2004, the United Nations Committee on the Rights of the Child condemned Mano Dura. Despite these criticisms and the failure of Mano Dura to reduce El Salvador's homicide rate, the policy remains very popular amongst the Salvadoran population.

== See also ==
- Terrorism Confinement Center
