= 2018 Costa Rican general election =

- 4 February 2018 (first round); 1 April 2018 (second round)
- Presidential election
- Registered: 3,322,329
- Turnout: 65.70% (first round) ▼2.78pp 66.45% (second round) ▲9.95pp
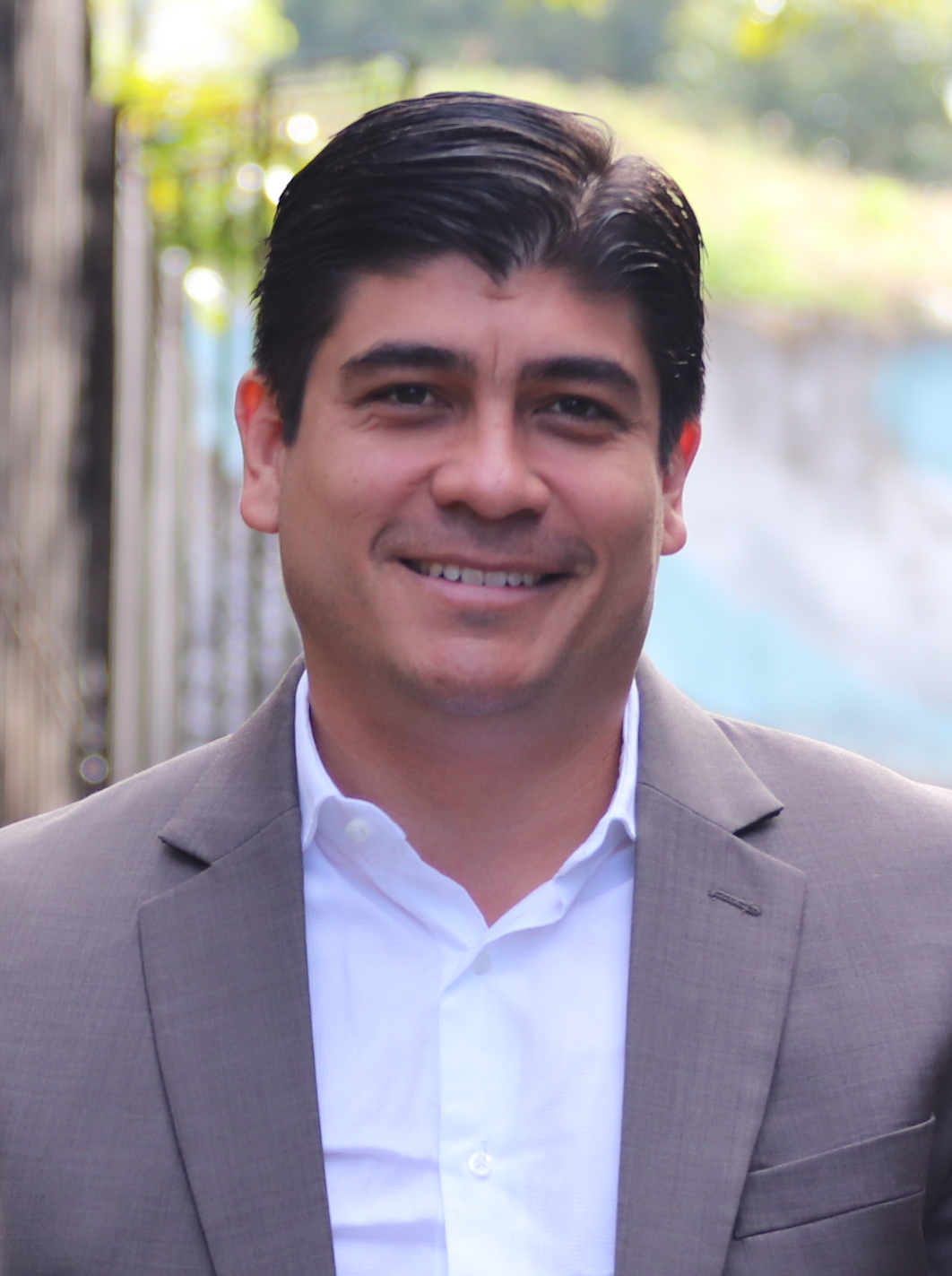

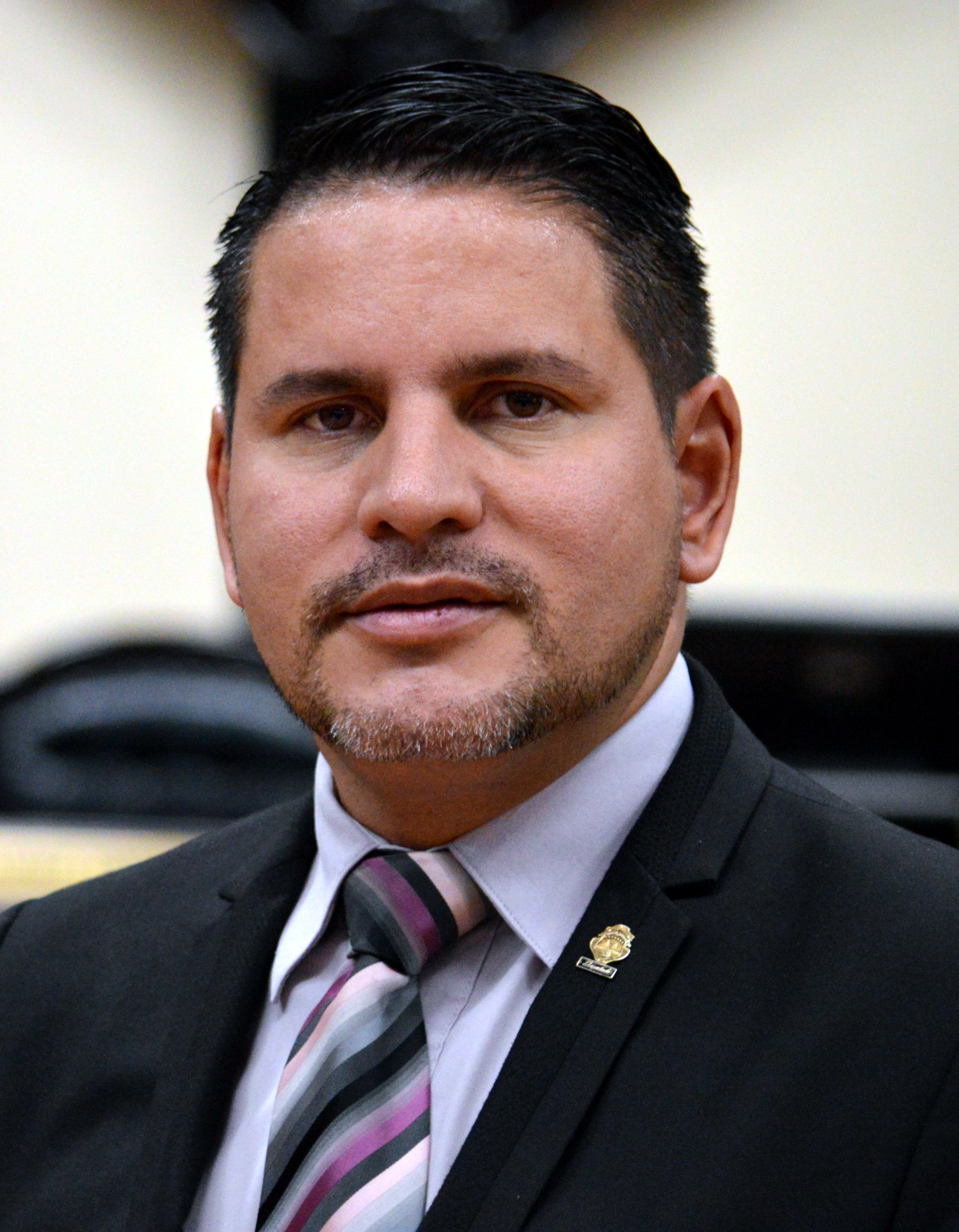
Nominee	Carlos Alvarado	Fabricio Alvarado
Party	PAC	PREN
Running mate	Epsy Campbell; Marvin Rodríguez	Ivonne Acuña; Francisco J. Prendas
Popular vote	1,322,908	860,388
Percentage	60.59%	39.41%
- Alvarado-Quesada: 20-30% 30-40% 40-50% 50-60% 60-70% 70-80% 80-90% 90-100% Alvarado-Muñoz: 20-30% 30-40% 40-50% 50-60% 60-70% 70-80% 80-90% Álvarez: 20-30% 30-40% 40-50% Piza: 20-30% 30-40% 40-50% Castro: 20-30% Hernández: 20-30%
President before election
Luis Guillermo Solís
PAC
Elected President
Carlos Alvarado Quesada
PAC
- Legislative election
- All 57 seats in the Legislative Assembly; 29 seats needed for a majority
- Turnout: 65.56% (▼2.82pp)
Party	Leader	Vote %	Seats	+/–
PLN	Antonio Álvarez Desanti	19.49	17	−1
PREN	Fabricio Alvarado Muñoz	18.16	14	+13
PAC	Carlos Alvarado Quesada	16.27	10	−3
PUSC	Rodolfo Piza Rocafort	14.60	9	+1
PIN	Juan Diego Castro Fernández	7.67	4	+4
PRSC	Rodolfo Hernández Gómez	4.21	2	New
FA	Edgardo Araya Sibaja	3.95	1	−8
This lists parties that won seats. See the complete results below.
Results by province

General elections were held in Costa Rica in 2018 to elect both the President and Legislative Assembly. The first round of the presidential election was held on 4 February 2018, with the two highest-ranked candidates being Christian singer and Congressman Fabricio Alvarado Muñoz from the conservative National Restoration Party and writer and former Minister Carlos Alvarado from the progressive Citizens' Action Party, gaining 24% and 21% of the votes respectively. As no candidate received more than 40% of the first round vote, a second round run-off election was held on 1 April 2018 and was won by Carlos Alvarado Quesada, with a landslide victory of 60.6% of the vote.

The previously dominant National Liberation Party suffered its worst results to date, ending third in the presidential run for the first time in its history with its candidate former Legislative Assembly President Antonio Álvarez Desanti winning only 18%. Other notable candidates were lawyer and entrepreneur Rodolfo Piza from the center-right Social Christian Unity Party with 16% and right-wing populist Juan Diego Castro with 9%.

In the 57-seat Legislative Assembly, the National Liberation Party won 17 seats, the National Restoration Party won 14 seats (although their parliamentary group later split in half due to factionalism), the Citizens' Action Party won 10 seats, the Social Christian Unity Party won 9 seats, the National Integration Party won 4 seats, the Social Christian Republican Party (an offshoot of PUSC) won 2 seats and left-wing Broad Front won 1 seat.

== Electoral system ==
The President of Costa Rica is elected using a modified two-round system in which a candidate must receive at least 40% of the vote to win in the first round; if no candidate wins in the first round, a runoff will be held between the two candidates with the biggest quantity of votes.

The 57 members of the Legislative Assembly are elected using closed list proportional representation through the largest remainder method from seven multi-member constituencies with between four and 19 seats, which are based on the seven provinces. Party lists were required to alternate between male and female candidates, with parties also required to have three or four of their seven regional lists headed by a female candidate.

== Presidential primaries ==
=== Citizens' Action Party ===
The internal elections for the Citizens' Action Party were held on 9 July 2017. The candidates were two former ministers of the Solís Rivera administration; writer Carlos Alvarado, former Minister of Labour and Social Issues, and economist Welmer Ramos, former Economy Minister. Alvarado won by 56% of the votes. Deputies Epsy Campbell, Ottón Solís and Vicepresident Ana Helena Chacón declined a potential run.

Carlos Alvarado was the first one of the party to announce his intention to run under the slogan of "I choose the future" (Elijo el futuro) and ran under a progressive platform, which sought to exalt the achievements of Luis Guillermo Solis's government and promised to continue with it. Meanwhile, Welmer Ramos's campaign focused more on a moderate and conservative campaign, under the slogan "A citizen like you" (Un ciudadano como usted) and openly criticized the then government to appeal to those who were upset with the administration.

=== Libertarian Movement ===
The Libertarian Movement had its first primaries on 30 June 2017.

Candidates were deputy Natalia Diaz, and historic leader and deputy Otto Guevara Guth, who will attempt to run for presidency for the fifth time. Guevara won the primary over Diaz by a 10% margin. Otto Guevara's primary campaign was based under a right-wing populist inclination, stating that Donald Trump's presidential campaign had given him new inspiration to run, while Natalia Diaz's campaign promised to bring a new face to the party and offer a new alternative to the party's establishment.

After the 2016 municipal elections, the party lost its only mayor and 258 aldermen, leaving it with little power. Plus, due to Guevara's turnabout from libertarianism to religious conservatism, many party adherents created a new party: the Progressive Liberal Party, under former transport minister Eliécer Feinzag's leadership; or joined Social Christian Unity Party because of its new liberal stance on politics.

=== National Liberation Party ===
The internal elections for the National Liberation Party were held on 2 April 2017. The candidates were Sigifredo Aiza Campos, former deputy for the Guanacaste province, then deputy and radio host Rolando González Ulloa, Antonio Álvarez Desanti president of the Legislative Assembly, former minister and presidential candidate who was supported by former president Óscar Arias Sánchez, and former president José María Figueres Olsen. Álvarez Desanti was chosen as the party's candidate.

=== Social Christian Unity Party ===
The Social Christian primary was held on 4 June 2017 with former president of the Health System and previous candidate Rodolfo Piza winning over then deputy Rafael Ortiz.

=== Other candidates ===
Former Public Safety Minister Juan Diego Castro launched his unexpected presidential campaign presenting himself as a political outsider and with a strong anti-establishment and anti-corruption speech. Promising to "rule by decree" and with a very loud "hard hand" rhetoric (uncommon in Costa Rican politics as the country is famous for its political centrism), Castro has been compared to figures like Donald Trump and Rodrigo Duterte, and accused of right-wing populism and far-right positions, albeit he rejects the comparisons. He ran as the National Integration Party's nominee.

Four of the minor candidates lean towards the conservative evangelical community. These are former journalist and San José deputy Fabricio Alvarado for National Restoration Party, journalist Stephanie Campos for Costa Rican Renewal Party, perennial candidate and San José deputy Óscar López for Accessibility without Exclusion Party, and lawyer and twice Cartago deputy Mario Redondo for Christian Democratic Alliance a former Cartaginese provincial party but which expanded to the national level. The left-wing Broad Front nominated Alajuela deputy Edgardo Araya (es:Edgardo Araya Sibaja). The far-left Workers' Party chose the trade unionist and high school professor Jhon Vega as its candidate. The right-wing New Generation Party chose its founder Sergio Mena as the presidential nominee. Finally, former Social Christian Unity Party's presidential nominee Rodolfo Hernández (es:Rodolfo Hernández Gómez) launched his presidential campaign with the newly formed Social Christian Republican Party, a party formed by former PUSC members dissatisfied with the liberal-controlled Social Christian Central Committee, who claimed the party had lost its Calderonist origins

== Presidential candidates ==
Citizens' Action Party
Carlos Alvarado Quesada	Epsy Campbell	Marvin Rodríguez
for President	for Vice presidents	
Labor Minister (2014–2016); Executive President of the Joint Social Welfare Institute (2016–2017)	Deputy in the Legislative Assembly (2002–2006 and 2014–2018)	Labor Union Leader

National Restoration Party
Fabricio Alvarado Muñoz	Ivonne Acuña	Francisco Prendas
for President	for Vice presidents	
Deputy in the Legislative Assembly (2014–2018)		

=== Other presidential candidates ===
Candidates included in this section have received more than 2% support in popular vote.
Antonio Álvarez	Rodolfo Piza	Juan Diego Castro	Rodolfo Hernández
Minister of Farming (1987–1988); Minister of Governance (1988–1999); Deputy (1994–1998 and 2014–2017)	Justice of the Supreme Court (2009–2013); Executive President; Costa Rican Social Security Fund (1998–2002)	Minister of Public Safety (1994–1996); Minister of Justice (1997–1998)	Director; Costa Rica's Children's Hospital (2001–2014)
National Liberation Party	Social Christian Unity Party	National Integration Party	Social Christian Republican Party

== Campaign ==
Several topics like unemployment, corruption, economics, insecurity and poverty are among the main issues that concern the electorate according to polls.

But one particular event that cause uproar in the campaign was the "Cementazo" (lit. cement hit) scandal. A corruption scandal involving political figures of all the main parties, including candidate Otto Guevara, whose properties and parliamentary office were raided by the General Attorney investigating the case. Some analysts point to the Cementazo scandal as one of the reasons for the unexpected ascension in polls of hardline anti-establishment candidate Castro.

During the campaign Castro made a series of highly controversial statements that often caused polemic reactions. Among other things, he accused the Judiciary of having some of its female members ascending due to sexual favors, something that sprang harsh responses from female judges and judicial workers. Political figures from other parties reacted with outrage including Desanti's wife Nuria Marin and PAC's vice-president nominee Epsy Campbell. He later clarified that he was referring to one particular case of a known female friend of his. He also called for the removal of the prohibition on oil exploitation and gold mining calling those who opposed it "eco-terrorists and extremists". Desanti also said that "extremists should not dictate environmental policies" but mentioned that he opposes oil exploitation. Both Alvarado Quesada and Araya are staunch opponents of all forms of oil exploration and exploitation.

A surprising ruling from the Inter-American Court of Human Rights extending all rights enjoyed by heterosexual couples to same-sex couples made after Costa Rica's government lodged a motion for clarification also had an impact on the campaign. The ruling may require up to 22 signatory countries of the Pact of San José that recognize the contentious authority of the IACHR to change their laws to legalize same-sex marriage (whether by legislative or judicial methods, or both). Most polls show that most Costa Ricans oppose gay marriage albeit with large numbers supporting it (in a general ratio of 60–40%). Opponents of gay marriage were outraged by the ruling, causing an increase in social media support for Christian singer and journalist Fabricio Alvarado Muñoz from the staunchly conservative National Restoration Party (a normally small party with testimonial results mostly supported by the Evangelical Christian minority). Alvarado Muñoz was, for the first time for an Evangelical candidate, attracting Catholic voters. Nevertheless, Alvarado Muñoz' gain also saw a counter-reaction. Social media support for progressive pro-gay marriage candidate Carlos Alvarado Quesada was also notable, particularly among millennials and centennials who mostly support socially liberal policies. Some analysts point to a possible polarization between conservative and progressive voters, or among religious and secular or older and younger generations depending on the measure, which pushed both Alvarados into the second round. At least two homophobic attacks were reported.

During the run-off campaign, Alvarado Muñoz’ strategy focused on linking his rival with the somewhat unpopular government at the time by pointing out its flaws, errors and scandals. On the contrary, Alvarado Quesada tried to distance himself from Luis Guillermo Solís’ Administration, but at the same time highlighted its achievements. Muñoz also reinforced his idea of defending "pro-life and family" values, whilst Quesada insisted in wanting an inclusive country with no "second class citizens". Quesada's strategy focused in presenting Muñoz as inexperienced and unprepared, pointing out his delay in presenting his second government program as promised and contradictions between him and some of his close collaborators.

A series of controversies affected Muñoz' presidential run, including accusations of plagiarism on his government program, a delay in the presentation of his party's financial reports, high payments to him and some other high-ranking party members for services during the campaign, etc. But probably one of the most damaging was the content of a book written by pastor and tele-evangelist Ronny Chaves (close collaborator of Fabricio and described by him as "spiritual father") calling "La Negrita" or Virgen de los Ángeles (Costa Rica's patron saint) a demon. Something that some analysts highlight as hurtful to many Catholics' feelings causing many of them to switch towards Carlos Alvarado. In fact, the Cartago Province which is Costa Rica's Catholic epicenter and see of the Basílica de Nuestra Señora de los Ángeles is where Quesada's support was higher (75%), on the contrary Fabricio won by wide margin in the mostly Protestant province of Limón.

In the second round Carlos kept San José, Heredia and Cartago Provinces and all of the cantons he won in the first one, and managed to turn Alajuela and Guanacaste on his favor. He also won, again, the foreign vote winning all ballot booths overseas except Singapore were there was a tie. Fabricio kept Puntarenas and Limón as his strongholds and won in all cantons of Limon, most of the Punteranas cantons, four of the northern cantons of Alajuela (San Carlos, Upala, Guatuso and Los Chiles) and Sarapiqui in Heredia. Abstentionism was less during the second round for the first time in history.

== Polling and voters' behavior ==
During pre-campaign Juan Diego Castro emerged as one of the most popular political figures with around 51% of positive opinions, followed by Antonio Álvarez Desanti with 36%, with Libertarian deputy Otto Guevara and former president José María Figueres as the ones with more negative opinions. After the PLN primary in which Desanti won over Figueres by slight margin, Desanti started the campaign as frontrunner for a while with up to 36% support in some early polls. Castro was also among the favorites even before he had a party supporting his candidacy (something required by law in Costa Rica as independent candidates are not allowed). As the campaign continued Desanti suffered a constant decrease in voters' intent. Castro remained as frontrunner for most of 2017, but an erratic and heavily controversial campaign begins to affect him losing support in January. PUSC's Rodolfo Piza remained as second in some polls, later replaced by Castro but still in third place.

The "Cementazo" scandal affected heavily the parties involved (PAC, PLN, PUSC and ML) especially during November and December when the Parliamentary Committee investigating the issue made most of its hearings, with all parties facing a reduction on their support.

The IACHR's ruling on same-sex marriage caused a turmoil in the country, with conservative candidate and staunch opponent Fabricio Alvarado showing a rapid increase in support passing from marginal percentages of around 2–6% to be in the lead with up to 17%. However, Carlos Alvarado's support also started to grow unusually fast especially in mid and late January with the later polls showing him surpassing other candidates including Castro and Piza, passing from sixth to third in a couple of days, and even in a technical tie with Desanti showing possibilities to go into the run-off. Castro appeared in fourth and Piza in fifth place as of late January. PAC's support historically tend to increase in January and after the debates, but it was also possible that its support came from more liberal voters fearful of a religious government.

According to polls Fabricio Alvarado Muñoz took most of his support from Evangelical Christian voters who represented around 70% of his supporters, followed by 20% Roman Catholics and 8% with no religion. Carlos Alvarado Quesada, on the contrary, was mostly supported by Catholics with 52% of his voters belonging to that denomination, followed by 29% non-religious and 13% Protestants. Alvarado Quesada was most popular among urban voters with higher education, whilst Alvarado Muñoz had strong support by those with only elementary or high school levels of education. Also Alvarado Quesada was more popular among voters under 35, whilst Alvarado Muñoz was more popular among women under 35 and voters of both sexes over 55.

A post-election study completed by the University of Costa Rica showed that Alvarado Quesada's success was in part due to his performance in the debates, his campaign and defense of the Rule of law. Whilst Alvarado Muñoz' supporters mentioned defense of the traditional family, the fact that he was a believer and being an alternative to PAC. Religion wasn't such an important factor as originally thought, but 71% of Alvarado Quesada's voters mentioned Ronny Chaves' anti-Catholic statements as something "bad or very bad", against 35% of Fabricio's voters expressing that such thing was indifferent to them. Roman Catholics were 60% more likely to vote for Carlos Alvarado than non-Catholics that were only 30%. Alvarado Quesada had also much more support from middle and High Classes especially from the urban areas and the Central Valley whilst Fabricio's support came from the periphery and coastal areas with higher poverty levels and where the population is lower and less willing to vote at all.

=== Polling tampering ===
One day I'll tell you where the fraud was, every Friday we expected a survey that was false.

— National Restoration President Carlos Avendaño, October 2018.

The last poll of the second round scheduled for 28 March was canceled due to the fact that OPol Consultores' executives alleged that threats had been made against their collaborators. Shortly before this announcement, social media reported that a vehicle registered in the name of the private limited company to which the pollster belongs and led by the director of the company traveled with flags of National Restoration.

Also the poll published by the Institute of Population Studies (IDESPO) of the National University, the only one that showed a wide advantage on the part of Carlos Alvarado over Fabricio, was questioned almost immediately by the digital newspaper El Mundo questioning its methodology. The Supreme Electoral Tribunal and the university's Council reaffirmed the validity of the poll. The IDESPO poll would be the closest to the electoral result of the second round together with an informal poll conducted by the Los Paleteros ice cream company.

After the campaign it was made public that during the second round the executive committee of the National Restoration Party had made payments to the polling company OPol according to financial reports submitted to the Supreme Electoral Tribunal. Party officials reported that these were political consultancies unrelated to the polls, however, subsequent investigations by the newspaper La Nación discovered a contract for the payment of the six polls that were carried out during the second round campaign, of which five were published by El Mundo. In all of them Fabricio Alvarado appeared as the winner by a wide margin. They were immediately shared in the social media of the group and the candidate as well as party personalities and allies including deputy-elect and vice presidential candidate Jonathan Prendas and deputy Mario Redondo. Catherina Convertino, general manager of Opinión Política CyC, a private limited company that owns both OPol and El Mundo newspaper, confirmed to La Nación that the second round polls had been requested by Juan Carlos Campos, head of the National Restoration campaign and that they decided to make it public following the debt of the party in the total payment of the contract.

== Results ==
=== President ===
Map on the left shows the seats won by each party by province. The map on the right shows which party won the plurality in each province in both rounds of the Presidential election.

Candidate	Party	First round		Second round	
Candidate	Party	Votes	%	Votes	%
Fabricio Alvarado Muñoz	National Restoration Party	538,504	24.99	860,388	39.41
Carlos Alvarado Quesada	Citizens' Action Party	466,129	21.63	1,322,908	60.59
Antonio Álvarez Desanti	National Liberation Party	401,505	18.63		
Rodolfo Piza Rocafort	Social Christian Unity Party	344,595	15.99		
Juan Diego Castro Fernández	National Integration Party	205,602	9.54		
Rodolfo Hernández Gómez	Social Christian Republican Party	106,444	4.94		
Otto Guevara	Libertarian Movement	21,890	1.02		
Edgardo Araya	Broad Front	16,862	0.78		
Sergio Mena	New Generation Party	16,329	0.76		
Mario Redondo	Christian Democratic Alliance	12,638	0.59		
Stephanie Campos	Costa Rican Renewal Party	12,309	0.57		
Óscar López	Accessibility without Exclusion Party	7,539	0.35		
Jhon Vega	Workers' Party	4,351	0.20		
Total		2,154,697	100.00	2,183,296	100.00
Valid votes		2,154,697	98.71	2,183,296	98.90
Invalid/blank votes		28,067	1.29	24,260	1.10
Total votes		2,182,764	100.00	2,207,556	100.00
Registered voters/turnout		3,322,329	65.70	3,322,329	66.45
Source: TSE, TSE

==== By province ====
First round

Province	PREN %	PAC %	PLN %	PUSC %	PIN %	PRSC %	ML %	FA %	PNG %	Other %
San José Province	22.89	23.51	17.98	17.98	9.01	4.59	1.02	0.78	0.85	1.40
Alajuela	26.76	21.83	18.16	15.23	8.85	5.44	0.91	0.75	0.72	1.34
Cartago Province	15.02	26.43	20.17	15.06	10.87	6.36	1.03	0.76	0.86	3.45
Heredia	21.18	27.28	17.68	18.08	8.07	3.72	1.02	0.80	0.93	1.23
Puntarenas	35.54	12.02	18.50	13.64	11.51	4.85	1.07	0.80	0.56	1.50
Limón	42.58	10.56	17.56	9.24	10.40	4.59	1.29	0.94	0.43	2.41
Guanacaste	25.56	15.08	23.56	15.81	11.20	5.20	0.96	0.67	0.49	1.46
Total	24.99	21.63	18.63	15.99	9.54	4.94	1.02	0.78	0.76	1.72
Source: TSE

Abroad vote

Abroad vote
1. PAC (37.7%)
2. PUSC (22.7%)
3. PLN (17.0%)
4. PREN (11.7%)
5. PIN (5.53%)
6. FA (1.82%)
7. PRSC (0.98%)
8. PNG (0.73%)
9. ML (0.71%)

Country	PREN %	PAC %	PLN %	PUSC %	PIN %	PRSC %	ML %	FA %	PNG %	Other %
Germany	1.23	66.87	5.52	17.79	3.07	–	–	3.68	1.84	–
Argentina	3.75	55.00	8.75	15.00	5.00	–	1.25	10.00	1.25	–
Austria	2.63	57.89	7.89	23.68	7.89	–	–	–	–	–
Belgium	–	49.02	21.57	21.57	3.92	1.96	–	1.96	–	–
Belize	–	25.00	75.00	–	–	–	–	–	–	–
Brazil	14.29	33.33	14.29	14.29	4.76	–	4.76	14.29	–	–
Canada	7.64	47.92	11.81	17.36	4.86	2.08	2.08	2.78	2.08	1.39
Chile	3.70	48.15	19.44	24.07	0.93	–	–	1.85	–	1.85
China	2.27	45.45	22.73	22.73	–	–	2.27	2.27	–	2.27
Colombia	2.78	30.36	36.11	20.83	6.94	1.39	–	1.39	–	–
South Korea	14.29	50.00	14.29	14.29	7.14	–	–	–	–	–
Cuba	4.17	45.83	4.17	–	12.50	–	4.17	8.33	4.17	16.67
Ecuador	8.00	48.00	4.00	24.00	–	–	4.00	12.00	–	–
United States	18.44	30.49	16.06	23.30	7.18	1.70	0.40	0.62	0.79	1.02
El Salvador	5.97	26.87	23.88	22.39	14.93	1.49	1.49	1.49	–	1.49
Spain	5.45	51.98	12.87	24.75	1.49	–	0.50	1.98	0.50	0.50
France	0.71	63.83	14.18	12.77	2.84	–	–	4.26	1.42	–
Guatemala	15.63	23.13	20.63	25.00	10.00	0.63	–	3.13	1.25	0.63
Honduras	11.84	25.00	19.74	28.95	7.89	1.32	1.32	1.32	1.32	1.32
Israel	11.84	15.38	30.77	38.46	15.38	–	–	–	–	–
Italy	6.25	45.31	20.31	17.19	4.69	1.56	–	–	–	4.69
Japan	7.69	53.85	–	26.92	7.69	–	–	3.85	–	–
Mexico	7.45	35.64	12.23	36.17	3.19	–	0.53	2.13	0.53	2.13
Nicaragua	12.85	20.59	25.49	27.45	3.92	–	2.94	0.98	–	5.88
Netherlands	7.69	68.81	7.34	15.60	2.75	–	1.83	2.75	–	–
Panama	13.57	23.62	28.64	25.13	5.03	–	2.51	–	0.50	1.00
Peru	16.28	37.21	20.93	18.60	6.98	–	–	–	–	–
United Kingdom	1.67	44.17	25.83	23.33	0.83	–	–	2.50	0.83	0.83
Dominican Republic	19.15	21.28	17.02	38.30	–	–	–	–	2.13	2.13
Russia	–	64.29	21.43	–	14.29	–	–	–	–	–
Singapore	16.67	41.67	8.33	25.00	–	–	8.33	–	–	–
Switzerland	7.45	43.62	22.34	21.28	1.06	–	–	4.26	–	–
Trinidad and Tobago	33.33	33.33	33.33	–	–	–	–	–	–	–
Uruguay	14.29	57.14	–	14.29	14.29	–	–	–	–	–
Venezuela	10.00	16.00	42.00	20.00	2.00	6.00	–	4.00	–	–
India	–	–	100.00	–	–	–	–	–	–	–
Qatar	–	18.75	25.00	43.75	12.50	–	–	–	–	–
Bolivia	–	75.00	–	25.00	–	–	–	–	–	–
Paraguay	28.57	14.29	28.57	14.29	–	7.14	–	–	–	7.14
Australia	8.00	56.00	8.00	14.00	6.00	–	2.00	6.00	–	–
Jamaica	–	–	–	–	–	–	–	–	–	–
Turkey	–	100.00	–	–	–	–	–	–	–	–
Total	11.66	37.67	17.03	22.73	5.53	0.98	0.71	1.82	0.73	1.12
Source: TSE

Runoff

Province	PAC %	PREN %
San José Province	62.26	37.74
Alajuela	59.77	40.23
Cartago Province	74.62	25.38
Heredia	67.28	32.72
Puntarenas	45.04	54.96
Limón	36.64	63.36
Guanacaste	58.58	41.42
Total	60.59	39.41
Source: TSE

Abroad vote

Abroad vote, runoff
1. PAC (77.6%)
2. PREN (22.4%)

Country	PAC %	PREN %
Germany	96.34	3.66
Argentina	89.86	10.14
Austria	95.00	5.00
Belgium	87.23	12.77
Belize	66.67	33.33
Brazil	100.00	–
Canada	83.77	16.23
Chile	81.00	19.00
China	90.38	9.62
Colombia	85.48	14.52
South Korea	64.29	35.71
Cuba	78.95	21.04
Ecuador	90.00	10.00
United States	72.36	27.64
El Salvador	76.39	23.61
Spain	80.33	19.67
France	94.41	5.59
Guatemala	71.60	28.40
Honduras	54.29	45.71
Israel	66.67	33.33
Italy	84.91	15.09
Japan	87.50	12.50
Mexico	82.67	17.33
Nicaragua	67.44	32.56
Netherlands	91.89	8.11
Panama	73.27	26.73
Peru	78.18	21.82
United Kingdom	91.06	8.94
Dominican Republic	70.00	30.00
Russia	91.67	8.33
Singapore	50.00	50.00
Switzerland	90.24	9.76
Trinidad and Tobago	66.67	33.33
Uruguay	60.00	40.00
Venezuela	67.74	32.36
India	100.00	–
Qatar	77.27	22.73
Bolivia	83.33	16.67
Paraguay	45.45	54.54
Australia	79.49	20.51
Jamaica	–	–
Turkey	100.00	–
Total	77.62	22.38
Source: TSE

=== Legislative Assembly ===
The National Liberation Party retained its parliamentary plurality despite being third on the presidential ticket with 17 seats, followed by the National Restoration Party obtaining 14, the first time in Costa Rica's history that a religious party gained such large number. The ruling party Citizens' Action became third with 10. This was the first time in Costa Rican history that a ruling party was neither the second nor the third-largest party. However, that changed after a break-up among the National Restoration deputies, which caused more than half to split from the party a few months after the election, thus turning PAC back into first minority. The Social Christian Unity Party gained one more seat (9). The left-wing Broad Front suffered a major setback losing most of its seats passing from 9 to 1, whilst right-wing National Integration returns to Congress for the first time in 20 years with 4 seats, but another schism between the party's leadership and the 2018's nominee Juan Diego Castro causes one of PIN's deputies (a Castro loyalist) to separate. The newly formed party Social Christian Republican gains two deputies.

Party	Votes	%	Seats	+/–
National Liberation Party	416,638	19.49	17	–1
National Restoration Party	388,086	18.16	14	+13
Citizens' Action Party	347,703	16.27	10	–3
Social Christian Unity Party	312,097	14.60	9	+1
National Integration Party	163,933	7.67	4	+4
Social Christian Republican Party	89,969	4.21	2	New
Broad Front	84,437	3.95	1	–8
Christian Democratic Alliance	52,325	2.45	0	–1
Libertarian Movement	49,659	2.32	0	–4
Accessibility without Exclusion Party	46,071	2.16	0	–1
New Generation Party	45,896	2.15	0	0
Costa Rican Renewal Party	41,806	1.96	0	–2
Authentic Limonense Party	13,661	0.64	0	0
Progressive Liberal Party	12,537	0.59	0	New
Workers' Party	11,615	0.54	0	0
Let's Act Now	9,898	0.46	0	New
Let's Go	8,283	0.39	0	New
United Forces for Change Party	8,237	0.39	0	New
Everybody	8,062	0.38	0	New
Guanacastecan Union Party	7,994	0.37	0	New
United Communal Party	6,270	0.29	0	New
Transporters' Party	4,868	0.23	0	0
Recovering Values Party	4,840	0.23	0	New
Homeland, Equality & Democracy Party	1,881	0.09	0	0
New Socialist Party	790	0.04	0	0
Total	2,137,556	100.00	57	0
Valid votes	2,137,556	98.14		
Invalid/blank votes	40,540	1.86		
Total votes	2,178,096	100.00		
Registered voters/turnout	3,322,329	65.56		
Source: TSE

==== By constituency ====
Constituency	PLN		PREN		PAC		PUSC		PIN		PRSC		FA		ADC		ML		PASE		PNG		Other	
Constituency	%	S	%	S	%	S	%	S	%	S	%	S	%	S	%	S	%	S	%	S	%	S	%	S
San José	17.96	4	17.59	4	17.45	4	15.21	3	6.90	2	4.09	1	4.97	1	1.67	0	2.24	0	1.93	0	2.02	0	7.97	0
Alajuela	21.76	3	20.62	2	17.46	2	14.32	2	7.28	1	4.81	1	2.85	0	1.70	0	1.56	0	2.08	0	2.34	0	4.78	0
Cartago	19.86	2	10.52	1	19.88	2	13.31	1	8.19	1	4.72	0	3.55	0	5.65	0	1.83	0	2.59	0	3.19	0	12.36	0
Heredia	19.05	2	17.77	1	20.95	2	17.98	1	7.06	0	3.45	0	4.86	0	1.20	0	1.98	0	1.42	0	2.18	0	2.19	0
Puntarenas	21.59	2	24.88	2	9.28	0	14.33	1	9.24	0	4.57	0	3.05	0	1.94	0	3.42	0	1.05	0	2.47	0	5.23	0
Limón	14.91	2	23.28	3	6.83	0	9.64	0	6.59	0	3.61	0	3.81	0	5.70	0	4.25	0	4.25	0	0.62	0	16.51	0
Guanacaste	23.36	2	15.72	1	9.94	0	14.85	1	12.29	0	3.51	0	2.27	0	1.83	0	3.21	0	3.03	0	1.41	0	8.56	0
Total	19.49	17	18.15	14	16.26	10	14.63	9	7.67	4	4.21	2	3.95	1	2.45	0	2.32	0	2.26	0	2.15	0	6.46	0
Source: TSE VozyVoto

== Reactions ==
=== Domestic ===
- Opponent candidate Fabricio Alvarado quickly acknowledge defeat and congratulated Carlos Alvarado who he called personally to his phone. He called for the Costa Rican family to be united and for families split by politics to embrace each other.
- President of the Electoral Court Antonio Sobrado expressed satisfaction with the electoral process and said that "sovereign people has spoken".
- President of Costa Rica Luis Guillermo Solís congratulated his successor and fellow party member and expressed his wish for Alvarado to accompany him to the Summits of the Americas in mid-April, yet Alvarado declined.
- Carlos Alvarado spoke to a crowd of followers in Plaza Roosevelt, San Pedro of Montes de Oca thanking the voluntary workers of his campaign, the members of the different parties that supported him and calling for a government of national unity, and for Congress to quickly solve issues like the tax reform and the Legislative bylaw.

=== International ===
Supranational

- United Nations – Alice Shackelford on behalf of the United Nations congratulated Costa Rica describing the elections as "peaceful and in an environment of respect" and congratulated voters for choosing a more inclusive society.
- Organization of American States – Secretary General Luis Almagro congratulated Alvarado Quesada as president elect and Costa Rica's people for what he called "the democratic festivity".

States

- Canada – Prime Minister of Canada Justin Trudeau spoke directly over the phone with Alvarado expressing his satisfaction with having another young voice among world leaders and describing Costa Rica as an example in human rights and environmental policies.
- Chile – Former President of Chile Michelle Bachelet congratulated both Carlos Alvarado and Epsy Campbell noticing Campbell's status as first person of African descent in being Vice President of the [continental] Americas, expressing "Our Costa Rican brothers gave us a sample of democracy and inclusion, as necessary today".
- Colombia – President of Colombia Juan Manuel Santos said: "Count on Colombia to keep strengthening friendship bonds".
- Ecuador – Former President of Ecuador Rafael Correa saluted Alvarado and gave a special salute to Campbell as first Black woman Vice President of Latin America closing with "Gender equality, ethnic and Youth".
- Guatemala – President of Guatemala Jimmy Morales congratulated the Costa Rican people and advocated for a "a more united and prosperous Central America".
- Honduras – President of Honduras Juan Orlando Hernández "express congratulations of behalf of the Honduran people and the desire of tighten relationships."
- Mexico – President of Mexico Enrique Peña Nieto described the election as "a sample of democratic maturity" congratulating Alvarado and announcing that with the new government "Mexico will continue strengthening the cooperation and economic bonds".
- Nicaragua – President of Nicaragua Daniel Ortega express his hope that the new government may be a way to improve relationships between the two countries. "
- Panama – President of Panama Juan Carlos Varela after congratulating Alvarado and the Costa Rican people also mentioned that "We'll keep working on a State agenda between our sister nations and peoples".".
- Spain – President of the Spanish government Mariano Rajoy described Costa Rica and Spain as sister nations and said he was sure that both countries would continue strengthening bonds of friendship and cooperation, also highlighting Costa Rica's economic growth and inclusive development in the last governments.
- United States – United States Department of State expressed its congratulations on behalf of the US government and described the elections as "pacific, fair and free" and Costa Rica as "promoter of economic prosperity, security and good government in the region."
- Venezuela – Foreign Minister Jorge Arreaza on behalf of Nicolás Maduro congratulated Alvarado as president elect and the Costa Rican people, the government of Venezuela also made public an official statement.
