= Rodolfo Piza Rocafort =

Costa Rican politician (born 1958)

Rodolfo Piza
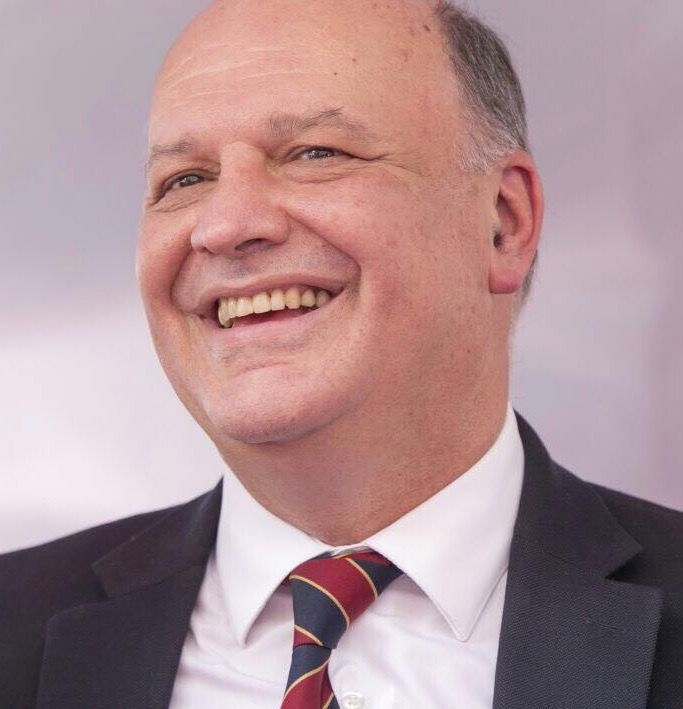
- Piza in 2017

Minister of the Presidency of Costa Rica
- In office 8 May 2018 – 29 July 2019
- President: Carlos Alvarado Quesada
- Preceded by: Sergio Alfaro Salas
- Succeeded by: Víctor Morales Mora

Secretary-General of the Social Christian Unity Party
- In office 6 July 2014 – 25 January 2017
- President: Pedro Muñoz Fonseca
- Preceded by: William Alvarado Bogantes
- Succeeded by: Pablo Heriberto Abarca Mora

President of the Costa Rican Social Security Fund
- In office 8 May 1998 – 8 May 2002
- President: Miguel Ángel Rodríguez Echeverría
- Succeeded by: Eliseo Vargas García

Personal details
- Born: Rodolfo Emilio Francisco Manuel de Jesús Piza de Rocafort; 12 August 1958 (age 68) San José, Costa Rica
- Party: PUSC (1983-2005; 2011-2021; 2025-present)
- Other political affiliations: Libertarian Movement (2005-2011); Our People Party (2021-2025)
- Education: University of Costa Rica (LLB); Complutense University (LL.D.)

Rodolfo Piza Rocafort (born 12 August 1958) is a Costa Rican politician and lawyer. He served as executive president of the Costa Rican Social Security Fund during the administration of Miguel Ángel Rodríguez (PUSC), and later served as justice of the Supreme Court of Justice.

He was also one of the notables elected by the government of Laura Chinchilla to issue a report on state reform. Piza was a candidate for the Social Christian Unity Party from the Social-Christian Rebirth faction in the 2013 Social-Christian primary elections, being defeated by rival Rodolfo Hernández who, however, chose Piza as a vice presidential candidate after the convention had passed.

Following the resignation of Hernández as a candidate on 5 October, Piza announced on 11 October that he had accepted to be the PUSC candidate. The appointment took place after an agreement between the Christian Social Rebirth and Calderonist Convergence factions. In the meeting for his choice were the one who was the campaign chief of Hernandez, Humberto Vargas, Carlos Araya Guillén and the candidate for deputy by Cartago, Jorge Rodríguez. In addition, by the executive committee, Gerardo Vargas, the president, and Gerardo Alvarado, Secretary General

His candidacy was registered on 17 October 2013. He was the fifth most voted candidate, winning 6% of the votes.

He ran again for the Presidency of Costa Rica for the 2018 Elections but lost in the first round.
