= National Liberation Party (Costa Rica) =

Political party of Costa Rica

National Liberation Party Partido Liberación Nacional
- Abbreviation: PLN
- President: Jorge Pattoni Sáenz
- Founder: José Figueres Ferrer
- Founded: 12 October 1951; 75 years ago
- Headquarters: Casa Liberacionista "José Figueres Ferrer", San José
- Student wing: Movimiento Universitario Liberacionista (MUL); Movimiento Estudiantil Liberacionista de Educación Media (MELEM)
- Youth wing: Juventud Liberacionista
- Membership (2025): ~100,000
- Ideology: Social democracy; Figuerism
- Political position: Centre to centre-left
- Regional affiliation: COPPPAL
- International affiliation: Socialist International
- Colours: Green, white
- Legislative Assembly: 17 / 57
- Intendants: 2 / 8
- Mayors: 29 / 82
- Alderpeople: 171 / 508
- Syndics: 260 / 486
- District councillors: 855 / 1,944

Party flag

Website
- www.plncr.org

The National Liberation Party (Spanish: Partido Liberación Nacional, PLN), nicknamed the verdiblancos (lit. 'green and whites'), is a political party in Costa Rica. The party is a member of the Socialist International. Social democratic by statute, the party has a few internal factions, including liberals, Third Way supporters, centrists, and social conservatives.

== History ==
In 1948 following controversy over the general election, a rebel group called National Liberation Army commanded by caudillo José Figueres Ferrer led a rebellion against the government of then President Rafael Angel Calderón Guardia and his communist allies. After the Civil War the rebels were victorious and Figueres took power de facto. Yet, Figueres did not overrule the social reforms made by Calderón and his allies, like Social Security, almost free college education and Labor Laws, but kept them and even made a series of progressive reforms himself, like abolishing the army and introducing taxation on capital. Figueres gave up power in favor of the democratically elected president Otilio Ulate in 1949.

On 12 October 1951, the Social Democratic Party, the Centre for the Study of National Problems and the group Democratic Action formed the National Liberation Party in order to participate in the 1953 election, the first election since the civil war, with Figueres as nominee and democratic socialism as their ideology. This election was very controversial as many parties were unable to participate, among others Calderon’s National Republican Party and the communists. Figueres won easily over the only other candidate with 65% of the votes.

For the 1958 general election, the PLN was split, as Jorge Rossi left the party after losing in the primaries and was basically an independent candidate, thus splitting the vote. The PLN suffered its first defeat as the opposition candidate, liberal Mario Echandi, won the election with the support of Calderón. However, after this time, PLN would be Costa Rica’s dominant party in the political system as only when the opposition ran united were they capable of winning. This was the case in the 1966 and 1978 election; the rest of the time PLN's nominees tended to win easily.

In 1986, younger leader Óscar Arias won the party’s nomination facing the traditional leadership of the party, including Figueres. Arias won also the country’s presidency and his role in the negotiation of a peace agreement to stop the Central American Wars earned him the Nobel Peace Prize. Some critics inside and outside the party pointed Arias’ administration as more neo-liberal than socialist and as a switch from PLN's traditional progressive views.

It wasn't until 1983 when the Unity Coalition merged into the Social Christian Unity Party that PLN had to confront what was basically a party of the same dimensions. It is after this time that Costa Rica entered a two-party system with PLN and PUSC as the two main political forces. However, in the 2000s, a new party was founded by many former PLN and PUSC leaders, among them former minister and deputy Ottón Solís, former First Lady Margarita Penón (Óscar Arias’ ex-wife) and notable writer and journalist Alberto Cañas. The new party, the Citizens Action Party, attracted many progressive voters dissatisfied with PLN’s turn to the right and is often pointed as one of the reasons for PLN nominee Rolando Araya's defeat in the 2002 general election. In any case, after PUSC's catastrophic debacle in 2005 due to a series of corruption scandals the PAC became the PLN's main political rival. This was particularly notorious in the 2006 election with Óscar Arias looking for re-election and the PAC's candidate Ottón Solís. Most Costa Ricans showed mixed feelings over Arias, some admiring him and some others very opposed to his figure. That and the issue of CAFTA that polarized public opinion as basically half the population was in favor and half against apparently was translated into the voting polls as Arias (who was pro-CAFTA) and Solís (who was anti-CAFTA) were practically tied after the election. Arias won by a very slight margin of less than 2% after an exhaustive counting.

In the same year's parliamentary election, the PLN won 25 out of 57 seats in the legislature. In the 2010 general election, Laura Chinchilla, the previous vice-president and the PLN candidate, won the election with an initial count of 47 percent.

A newspaper poll in July 2011 showed a decline in party popularity. Commentary on the poll pointed to an inherited fiscal crisis, border friction with Nicaragua, and natural disasters the previous November as contributing factors to public discontent.

In 2013, the PLN's candidate was Johnny Araya (Rolando Araya’s brother), San José Mayor since 1982, after other aspirants like former Presidential Minister Rodrigo Arias (Óscar Arias' brother) and former president José María Figueres (José Figueres' son) dropped from the race due to low polling numbers, making a primary unnecessary. Araya was the frontrunner for a while in most polls but finished second in the first electoral round, earning only 29% of the votes, the lowest percentage ever for a PLN nominee, and behind PAC's nominee Luis Guillermo Solís. For the run-off election Araya resigned his candidacy arguing that he had no more money to run a campaign and that all polls showed him losing by wide margin. Effectively in the second round Solís won with 78% of the votes and Araya gained only 22%.

Araya was expelled from the party after a resolution of the Ethics Committee due to his resignation as candidate in the second round (something unconstitutional, as the Constitution does not allow resigning a candidacy), thus Araya ran for Mayor of San José with a local party, winning the election in the 2016 municipal elections, in which PLN was the most voted party, yet it lost 14 mayoralties and received much fewer votes that in the previous municipal election.

The party, then as main opposition to Luis Guillermo Solís's government, went into a very divisive primary in which then deputy Antonio Álvarez Desanti won over former president José María Figueres. Internal fighting made impossible to reach an agreement among the factions leading to Figueres withdrawing his support of Desanti's nomination. Desanti, who had previously left the party whilst criticizing it for corruption and abandoning its social-democratic ideology, had the support of Oscar Arias and his brother Rodrigo, however. Nevertheless its results in the 2018 Costa Rican general election were crushing, as the party suffered its worst defeat in history with only 18.6% of votes and failing to gain a spot in the run-off, ending as third for the first time in its history. It also finished with its worst parliamentary results.

The party saw an improvement in the 2022 general election, finishing first in the first round of the presidential election, although losing in the runoff. It finished second in the 2026 election.

== Party leadership ==
Presidents of the party:

- Francisco José Orlich Bolmarcich, 1952–1956
- María Teresa Obregón Zamora, 1956–1957
- Rafael París Steffens, 1957–1958
- José Figueres Ferrer, 1958–1970
- Daniel Oduber Quirós, 1970–1974
- José Figueres Ferrer, 1974–1993
- Carlos Manuel Castillo Morales, 1993–1994
- Manuel Aguilar Bonilla, 1994–1995
- Rolando Araya Monge, 1995–1999
- Sonia Picado Sotela, 1999–2001
- Mireya Hernández, 2001–2002
- Ana Gabriela Ross, 2002
- Marielos Sancho Barquero, 2002–2003
- Francisco Antonio Pacheco, 2003–2010
- Bernal Jiménez Monge, 2010–2015
- José María Figueres Olsen, 2015–2016
- Jorge Pattoni Sáenz, interim, 2016–2019
- Guillermo Constenla Umaña, 2019
- Kattia Rivera Soto, interim, 2019–2022
- Ricardo Sancho Chavarría, 2022–

== Election results ==
=== Presidential ===
Election	Candidate	First round				Second round			
Election	Candidate	Votes	%	Position	Result	Votes	%	Position	Result
1953	José Figueres Ferrer	123,444	64.7%	1st	Won				
1958	Francisco Orlich	94,788	42.8%	▼2nd	Lost				
1962	Francisco Orlich	192,850	50.3%	▲1st	Won				
1966	Daniel Oduber	218,590	49.5%	▼2nd	Lost				
1970	José Figueres Ferrer	295,883	54.8%	▲1st	Won				
1974	Daniel Oduber	294,609	43.4%	1st	Won				
1978	Luis Alberto Monge	364,285	43.8%	▼2nd	Lost				
1982	Luis Alberto Monge	568,374	58.8%	▲1st	Won				
1986	Óscar Arias	620,314	52.3%	1st	Won				
1990	Carlos Manuel Castillo	636,701	47.2%	▼2nd	Lost				
1994	José Figueres Olsen	739,339	49.6%	▲1st	Won				
1998	José Miguel Corrales	618,834	44.4%	▼2nd	Lost				
2002	Rolando Araya	475,030	31.1%	2nd	─	563,202	42.0%	2nd	Lost
2006	Óscar Arias	664,551	40.9%	▲1st	Won				
2010	Laura Chinchilla	896,516	46.9%	1st	Won				
2014	Johnny Araya	610,634	29.7%	▼2nd	─	374,844	22.1%	2nd	Lost
2018	Antonio Álvarez	377,688	18.6%	▼3rd	Lost				
2022	José Figueres Olsen	571,518	27.3%	▲1st	─	924,699	47.2%	2nd	Lost
2026	Álvaro Ramos Chaves	861,879	33.65%	▼2nd	Lost				

=== Parliamentary ===
Election	Leader	Votes	%	Seats	+/–	Position	Government
1953	José Figueres Ferrer	114,043	64.7%	30 / 45	New	1st	Government
1958	Francisco Orlich	86,081	41.7%	20 / 45	▼10	1st	Opposition
1962	Francisco Orlich	184,135	49.8%	29 / 57	▲9	1st	Government
1966	Daniel Oduber	202,891	48.9%	29 / 57	0	1st	Opposition
1970	José Figueres Ferrer	269,038	50.7%	32 / 57	▲3	1st	Government
1974	Daniel Oduber	271,867	40.9%	27 / 57	▼5	1st	Government
1978	Luis Alberto Monge	155,047	48.2%	25 / 57	▼2	▼2nd	Opposition
1982	Luis Alberto Monge	527,231	55.5%	33 / 57	▲8	▲1st	Government
1986	Óscar Arias	560,694	47.8%	29 / 57	▼4	1st	Government
1990	Carlos Manuel Castillo	559,632	41.9%	25 / 57	▼4	▼2nd	Opposition
1994	José Figueres Olsen	658,258	44.6%	28 / 57	▲3	▲1st	Government
1998	José Miguel Corrales	481,933	34.8%	23 / 57	▼5	▼2nd	Opposition
2002	Rolando Araya	412,383	27.1%	17 / 57	▼6	2nd	Opposition
2006	Óscar Arias	589,731	36.5%	25 / 57	▲8	1st	Government
2010	Laura Chinchilla	708,043	37.3%	24 / 57	▼1	1st	Government
2014	Johnny Araya	526,531	25.7%	18 / 57	▼6	1st	Opposition
2018	Antonio Álvarez	416,638	19.5%	17 / 57	▼1	1st	Opposition
2022	José Figueres Olsen	515,231	24.8%	19 / 57	▲2	1st	Opposition
2026	Álvaro Ramos Chaves	591,604	23.25%	17 / 57	▼2	2nd	Opposition
