= Politics of Costa Rica =

The politics of Costa Rica take place in a framework of a presidential, representative democratic republic, with a multi-party system. Executive power is exercised by the president and their cabinet, and the President of Costa Rica is both the head of state and head of government. Legislative power is vested in the Legislative Assembly. The president and 57 Legislative Assembly deputies are elected for four-year terms. The judiciary operates independently from the executive and the legislature, but is involved in the political process. Costa Rica has a strong system of constitutional checks and balances. Voting is compulsory de jure, but this is not enforced.

The position of governor in the seven provinces was abolished in 1998. There are no provincial legislatures. In 2009, the state monopolies on insurance and telecommunications were opened to private-sector competition. Certain other state agencies enjoy considerable operational independence and autonomy; they include the electrical power company (Instituto Costarricense de Electricidad), the nationalized commercial banks (which are open to competition from private banks), and the social security agency (Caja Costarricense del Seguro Social). Costa Rica has no military but maintains a domestic police force and a Special Forces Unit as part of the Ministry of the President.

The Economist Intelligence Unit rated Costa Rica a "full democracy" in 2023. According to the V-Dem Democracy indices Costa Rica was in 2024 the most electoral and liberal democratic country in Latin America.

== History ==
The politics of Costa Rica were unstable during the 19th and 20th centuries, with frequent coups and episodes of political violence. However, Costa Rican politics were relatively more peaceful and stable than in neighboring states.

The 1986 presidential election was won by Óscar Arias of the PLN. During his tenure he experienced some criticism from within his own party for abandoning its traditional social democratic teachings and promoting a neoliberal economic model. He received the Nobel Peace Prize in 1987 for his efforts to end civil wars then raging in several Central American countries.

In the February 1998 national election, PUSC candidate Miguel Ángel Rodríguez won the presidency over PLN nominee José Miguel Corrales Bolaños. President Rodriguez assumed office May 8, 1998. The PUSC also obtained 27 seats in the 57-member Legislative Assembly, for a plurality, while the PLN got 23 and five minor parties won seven. Social Christian in philosophy, the PUSC generally favors neoliberalism, conservative fiscal policies, and government reform. President Rodriguez pledged to reduce the country's large internal debt, privatize state-owned utilities, attract additional foreign investment, eliminate social welfare programs, and promote the creation of jobs with decent salaries.

The reforms he tried to promote found opposition from several parties, including his own, and he asserted several times the country was "ungovernable". In particular, an attempt by the Legislative Assembly to approve a law that opened up the electricity and telecommunication markets (controlled by a monopoly of the Costa Rican Institute of Electricity - ICE) to market competition, known as the "Combo" law, was met with strong social opposition. The Combo law was supported by both major parties at the time (PLN and PUSC) as well as by President Rodriguez, but the first of three required legislative votes to approve it provoked the largest protest demonstrations the country had seen since 1970. The government quickly resolved to shelve the initiative. President Rodríguez's approval would reach an all-time low, and he was indicted by the Attorney General after leaving office on corruption charges.

In September 2000 the Constitutional Court rejected an argument by former president Arias that a 1969 constitutional amendment banning presidential reelection be rescinded. Arias thus remained barred from a second term as president; however, in April 2003–by which time two of the four judges who had voted against the change in 2000 had been replaced–the Court reconsidered the issue and, with the only dissenters being the two anti-reelection judges remaining from 2000, declared the 1969 amendment null and thus opened the way to reelection for former presidents–which in practice meant Arias.

In the 2002 national election, a new party founded by former PLN Deputy and government Minister Ottón Solís captured 26% of the vote, forcing a runoff election for the first time in the country's history. Abel Pacheco was elected president, under a national unity platform, but continuing most of the neoliberal and conservative policies of Miguel Ángel Rodríguez. This election was also important because new parties won several seats in the Legislative Assembly, more than ever. The PUSC obtained 19 seats, PLN 17 seats, PAC 14 seats, PML 6 seats and PRC one seat.

During 2004, several high-profile corruption scandals shattered the foundations of PUSC. Two former presidents from the party, Miguel Ángel Rodríguez and Rafael Ángel Calderón, were arrested on corruption charges and are currently waiting for the investigation to end and trial to begin. Also involved in scandals has been José María Figueres, former president from PLN and former head of the World Economic Forum.

The 2006 national election was expected to be a landslide for former president (1986–1990) and PLN's candidate Óscar Arias, but it turned out to be the closest in modern history. Although polls just a week before the election gave Arias a comfortable lead of at least 12% (and up to 20%), preliminary election results gave him only a 0.4% lead over rival Ottón Solís and prompted a manual recount of all ballots. After a month-long recount and several appeals from different parties, Arias was declared the official winner with 40.9% of the votes against 39.8% for Solís.

When Óscar Arias returned to office, the political debate shifted to the ratification of the Central American Free Trade Agreement (CAFTA). Main supporters of the approval included the President's PLN, which established a coalition with PUSC and ML in the Legislative Assembly to approve the implementation laws in the Assembly, as well as different business chambers. The main opposition to CAFTA came from PAC, labor unions, environmental organizations and public universities. In April 2007, former PLN Presidential candidate and CAFTA opponent José Miguel Corrales Bolaños won a legal battle at the Supreme Electoral Tribunal, which authorized him to gather over 100,000 signatures to send CAFTA to a referendum and let the people decide the fate of the controversial agreement. As the February 28, 2008 deadline to approve or reject CAFTA loomed, Arias decided to call for the referendum himself, and it took take place on October 7, 2007. CAFTA was approved with 51.5% of voters supporting it, although the election faced criticism due to international, including US, involvement.

The Costa Rican general election, 2010 was won by Laura Chinchilla of centrist National Liberation Party, who had been vice-president in the previous Arias administration. In May 2010, she was sworn in as the first female President of Costa Rica.

In 2014, Luis Guillermo Solís, PAC's presidential candidate campaigning on a platform of economic reform and anti-corruption, surprised political observers by winning 30.95% of votes in the first round, while PLN candidate Johnny Araya gained the second most votes with 29.95%. Broad Front's José María Villalta Florez-Estrada won 17% of the votes. On March 6, 2014, Araya announced that he would abandon his presidential campaign after polls showed him far behind Luis Guillermo Solís. Elections were held on April 6, 2014, as required by election law, and Solís won with 77.81% of the votes. According to the BBC, the success of Solís and Villalta is another example of anti-neoliberal politics in Latin America.

In April 2018, Carlos Alvarado won the presidential election. He became the new President of Costa Rica, succeeding President Guillermo Solís. Both Solis and Alvarado represented centre-left Citizens' Action Party.

In May 2022, Costa Rica's new president Rodrigo Chaves, right-wing former finance minister, was sworn in for a four-year presidential term. He had won the election runoff against former president Jose María Figueres.

In February 2026, Laura Fernández Delgado, a right-wing populist, was elected as the president of Costa Rica after winning the general election.

== Branches of government ==
=== Executive branch ===
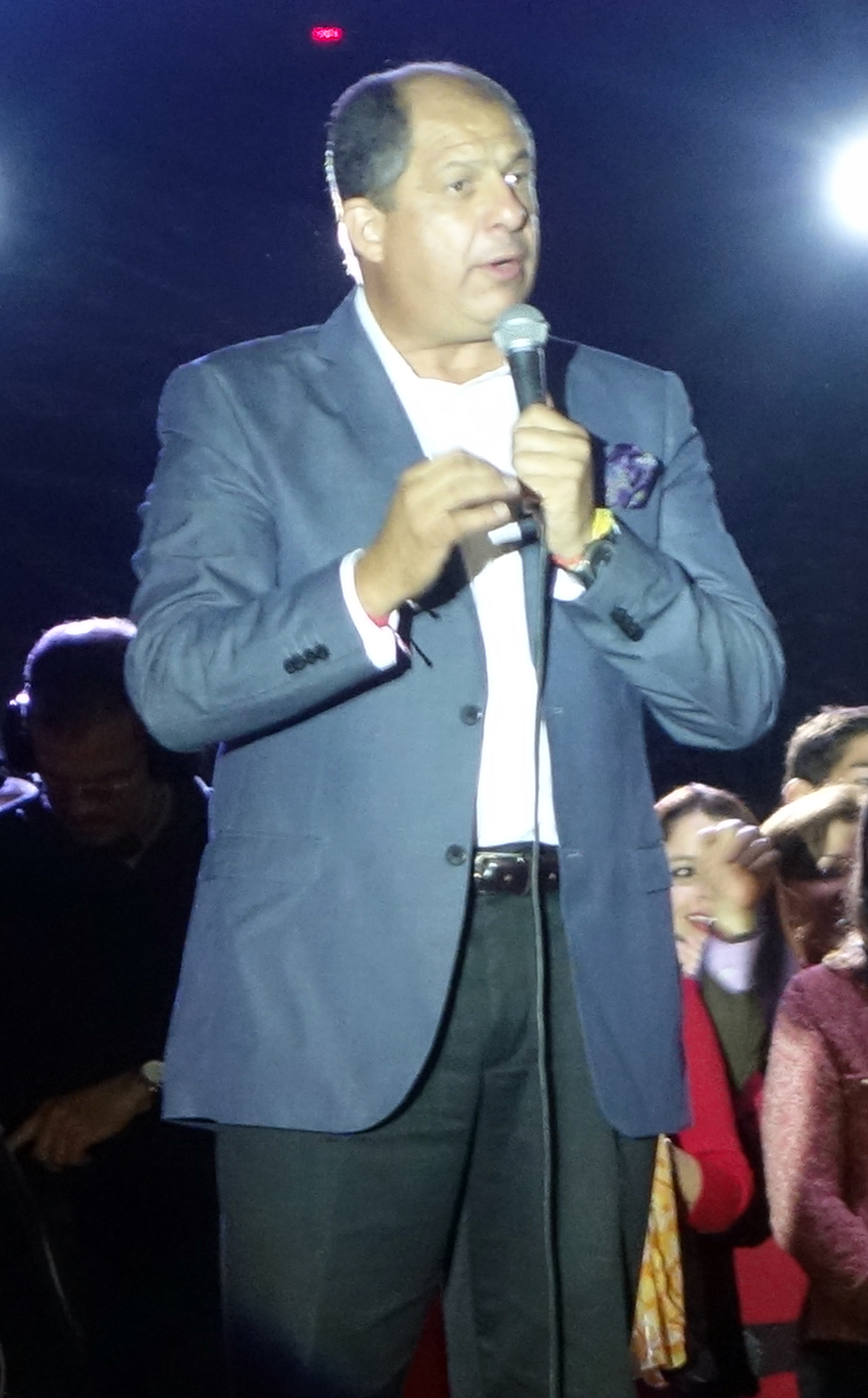
Luis Guillermo Solís served as president between 2014 and 2018, being the first in 66 years not to come from the two-party system.

Executive responsibilities are vested in a president, who is elected to a term of four years directly by the voters, not by the Legislative Assembly as it would be in a parliamentary system. There also are two vice presidents and the president's cabinet composed of his ministers. A constitutional amendment approved in 1969 limits presidents and deputies to one term, although a deputy may run again for an Assembly seat after sitting out a term. The prohibition was officially recognized as unconstitutional in April 2004, allowing Óscar Arias to run for president a second time in the 2006 Costa Rican presidential elections, which he won with a margin of approximately 1%.

The President of Costa Rica has limited powers, particularly in comparison to other Latin American presidents. For example, the president cannot veto the legislative budget, and, thus, the Legislative Assembly is sovereign over the year's single most important piece of legislation. On the other hand, the president can appoint anyone to their cabinet without approval from the Assembly. This provides the single most important power versus the Legislative Assembly that any Costa Rican president has.

Main office-holders
Office	Name	Party	Since
President	Laura Fernández Delgado	Sovereign People's Party	8 May 2026
1st Vice President	Francisco Gamboa Soto	Sovereign People's Party	8 May 2026
2nd Vice President	Douglas Soto Campos	Sovereign People's Party	8 May 2026

==== Ministries ====
- Ministry of the Presidency
- Ministry of Foreign Affairs and Worship
- Ministry of Finance
- Ministry of Public Security
- Ministry of Justice and Peace
- Ministry of Public Education
- Ministry of Public Works and Transports
- Ministry of Economy, Industry and Commerce
- Ministry of Agriculture and Livestock
- Ministry of Health
- Ministry of Labour and Social Security
- Ministry of Culture and Youth
- Ministry of National Planning and Economical Policy
- Ministry of Environment and Energy
- Ministry of Housing and Human Settlements
- Ministry of Foreign Trade
- Ministry of Science, Technology and Telecommunications
- Ministry of Communication

=== Legislative branch ===
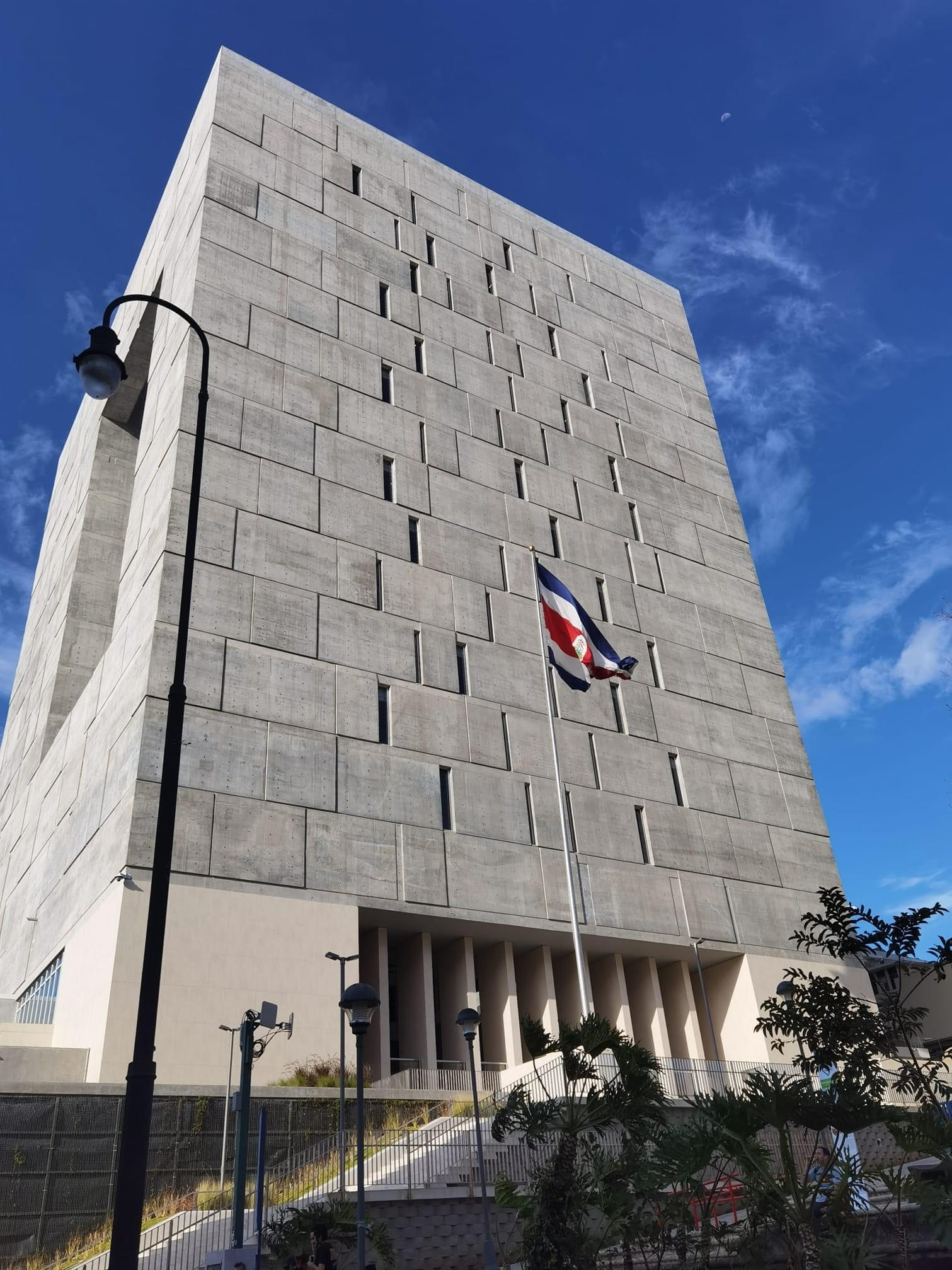
Meeting place of the Legislative Assembly of Costa Rica

Legislative powers are held by the Legislative Assembly. Legislators, called deputies, are elected to non-consecutive four-year terms by popular, direct vote, using proportional representation in each of the country's seven provinces. As a result, there are nine separate political parties serving in the Legislative Assembly, with National Liberation Party holding 18 seats, the Citizens' Action Party holding 13, and Broad Front and the Social Christian Unity Party each holding 8. Other parties hold the remaining seats.

Main office-holders
Office	Name	Party	Since
Legislative Assembly President	Yara Jiménez Fallas	Sovereign People's Party	1 May 2026

=== Judicial branch ===
The main arm of the judiciary is the Supreme Court of Justice. Twenty-two magistrates are selected for the CSJ for 8-year terms by the Legislative Assembly, and lower courts. Sala IV, also known as the Constitutional Chamber of the Supreme Court, reviews legislation, executive actions, and certain writs for constitutionality. Courts below the Sala IV deal with issues involving legal and criminal disputes. Additionally, the Supreme Electoral Tribunal (TSE for its Spanish initials) is an independent branch of the CSJ, responsible for democratic elections. While the judiciary is independent of the politically elected executive and legislative branches, it is often responsible for resolving political and legal conflicts.

=== Institutional oversight ===
A Comptroller General, Procurator General, and an Ombudsman oversee the government and operate autonomously. These institutions have the right to scrutinize, investigate and prosecute government contracts. In addition, they may impose procedural requirements on most political and governmental agencies. The actions of politicians and political parties are frequently researched by these institutions.

== Elections ==
On the national level, the president, two vice-presidents and a legislature are elected for a four-year term. The Legislative Assembly has 57 members, elected by proportional representation in each of the country's seven provinces.

The electoral process is supervised by an independent Supreme Electoral Tribunal (TSE for its Spanish initials). The TSE is a commission of three principal magistrates and six alternates selected by the Supreme Court of Justice of Costa Rica. All elections are conducted by a secret ballot at local polling stations. Voting is mandatory for registered citizens under Article 93 of the Constitution of Costa Rica, but this is not enforced.

On election days, political parties often organize caravans and marches to get supporters to polling stations. In many areas, voting takes on a festive atmosphere with supporters of each party wearing traditional colors and decorating their cars, houses, and livestock with colored ribbons. Because the day of elections is a national holiday, most people have the day off.

== Political parties ==
Currently, there are nine active political parties with representation in the Legislative Assembly of Costa Rica. An additional twelve parties ran, but did not receive enough votes to earn a seat in the assembly, making the total number of active parties in Costa Rica twenty-one. Starting in the 2000s, disagreement about many of the neo-liberal policies promoted by the dominant PLN caused the traditional party system of alliances among a few parties to fracture. Although still a stable country, the shift toward many political parties and away from PUSC and PLN is a recent development. Various elected positions within the country, such as mayors and city council members, are held by many different national and local political parties.

Political parties in the Legislative Assembly, 2014–2018
Party name (English)	Party name (Spanish)	Legislative seats (2014)	Ideology	Historic notes
National Liberation Party	Partido Liberación Nacional (PLN)	18	Centrist, social democracy	Founded in 1951. Controlled the legislative assembly since inception and presidency for all but four elections.
Citizens' Action Party	Partido Acción Ciudadana (PAC)	13	Progressive, social democracy	Founded in 2002. Won presidential election of 2014.
Broad Front	Frente Amplio (FA)	9	Green, progressivism, humanism	Founded in 2004. Never controlled presidency.
Social Christian Unity Party	Partido Unidad Social Cristiana, (PUSC)	8	Conservatism	Founded 1983 by four opposition parties. The main historical opposition to PLN. Three presidential victories in 1990, 1998, and 2002.
Libertarian Movement	Partido Movimiento Libertario (PML)	4	Classical liberalism, conservatism	Founded 1994. Never controlled presidency.
Costa Rican Renewal Party	Partido Renovación Costarricense (PRC)	2	Christian democracy, conservatism, right-wing	Founded in 1995. Never controlled presidency.
National Restoration Party (Costa Rica)	Partido Restauración Nacional (PRN)	1	Social Christianity, conservatism, right-wing	Founded in 2005. Never controlled presidency.
Accessibility without Exclusion	Partido Accessibilidad sin Exclusión (PASE)	1	Single issue, rights for people with disabilities	Founded 2001. Never controlled presidency.
Christian Democratic Alliance	Alianza Demócrata Cristiana (ADC)	1	Conservative, provincial (Cartago)	Founded in 2012.

Recent non-represented and defunct political parties
Party name (English)	Party name (Spanish)	Legislative seats (2014)	Ideology	Historic notes
National Union Party	Partido Unión Nacional (PUN)	0	Conservatism, Center-right	Founded in 1901. Existed in various forms and coalition parties. Won the presidency four times (1902, 1928, 1948, 1958, 1966). 1948 election was unrecognized. Defunct as of 2010.
National Rescue Party	Partido Rescate Nacional (PRN)	0	Center-left, Moderate socialist	Founded in 1996. Held one legislative seat in 2006. Defunct as of 2010.
Union for Change Party	Partido Unión para el Cambio (PUC)	0	Centrist, social democracy	Founded in 2005. Existed for one election cycle as protest from ex-PLN members. Defunct as of 2010.
Homeland First Party	Partido Patria Primero (PP)	0	Conservative, social democracy, Catholic interest	Founded in 2006. Existed for one election cycle as a protest from ex-PAC members. Defunct as of 2010.
National Democrat Alliance Party	Partido Alianza Democrática Nacionalista	0	Social democracy, nationalist	Founded in 2004. Opposed CAFTA. Defunct as of 2010.
National Integration Party	Partido Integración Nacional (PIN)	0	Conservatism, center	Founded in 1998. Active as of 2014 election.

== Strength of institutions ==
Institutional strength is a critical factor in politics since it defines the ability of political institutions to enforce rules, settle conflicts, and sustain stability in society. Weak institutions can lead to instability, violence, and authoritarianism, while solid institutions are associated with more durable and sufficient democracies. This is especially applicable in countries with fragile institutional frameworks, where strengthening institutions is essential for advancing democracy and stability. Elements such as economic development, a record of state-building, and external actors can contribute to institutional strength; understanding these factors is essential for enabling effective governance. Therefore, lawmakers and scholars must pay close watch to institutional strength when analyzing and formulating political strategies to advance stable and effective democracies that serve the interests of their citizens.

=== Rule of law ===
The rule of law refers to the idea that all individuals and institutions, including the state, are subject to the same rules and limitations. In Costa Rica, the rule of law is generally considered robust, with a separate judiciary branch, effective law enforcement, and low indices of corruption. However, there are also concerns about the efficiency of the justice system and the slow pace of legal proceedings, which can sometimes hinder the effective enforcement of the law.

=== Democratic institutions ===
Costa Rica is famous for its stable and well-functioning democracy, with periodic, accessible, and honest elections, a competitive party system, and a robust civil society. The country has a presidential system of government, with a unicameral legislature and a multi-party system. Nevertheless, there are also some obstacles to the country's democratic institutions, such as a lack of transparency and accountability in government and a high concentration of power among a small class of political elites.

=== Public services ===
Costa Rica's government provides many public services, including health care, education, and social welfare programs. The "Caja de Seguro Social" in Costa Rica maneuvered through the COVID-19 Pandemic with extreme precaution, providing one of the best responses by public healthcare systems. Their public health care system attests to strong political institutions and its 70% of its citizens entirely depend on the services. These services are generally well-funded and accessible to the general public. However, there are also concerns about the quality and productivity of these services and the sustainability of the country's public spending.

== See also ==
- Foreign relations of Costa Rica
