= List of female presidents in Latin America =

As of July 2026, 17 women in 12 countries have served as constitutional president of their country.

== Background ==
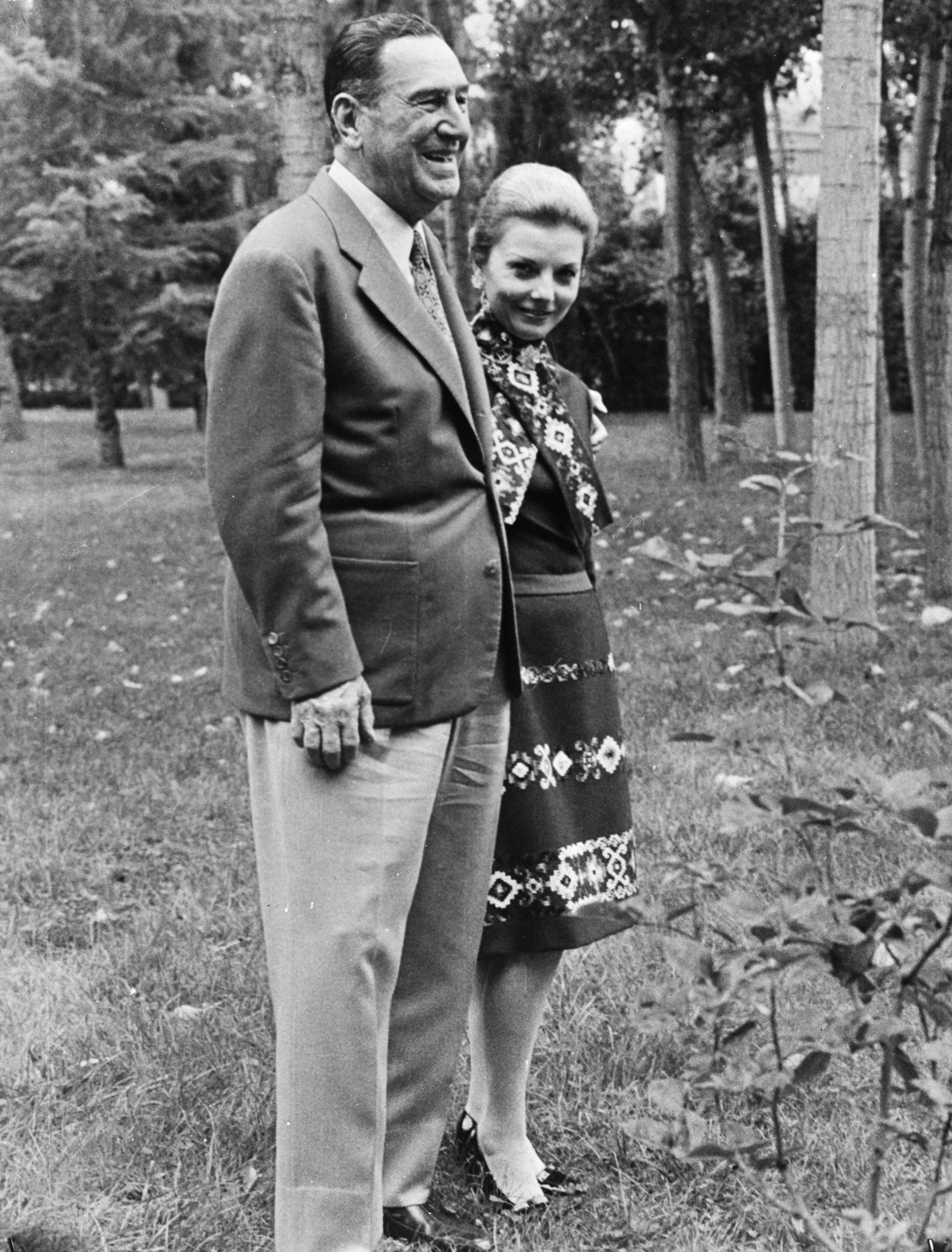
Isabel and Juan Perón in Spain in 1972

Latin American countries commonly use presidential systems. However, some nations have prime ministers that the president appoints. This includes Peru, which has had several female prime ministers.

Argentine Isabel Martinez de Peron was the first woman in the world to hold the title of president of any country, though not the first to be head of government. Rather than being elected to the position of president, she assumed the presidency following the death of president Juan Peron, under whom she served both as First Lady and vice president. This is a common situation: of 13 women, 5 assumed the presidency in the absence of a president.

Most female presidents in Latin America are part of the pink tide movement, which espouses ideologies on the left of the spectrum such as socialism, democratic socialism, left-wing populism, anti-neoliberalism, and left-wing nationalism. Leaders including Chile's Michelle Bachelet, Argentina's Cristina Fernández de Kirchner, Brazil's Dilma Rousseff, Honduras's Xiomara Castro, and Mexico's Claudia Sheinbaum all fall under this movement. However, in recent years, female politicians on the right have increasingly served as president in Latin America, including Bolivia's Jeanine Áñez, Costa Rica's Laura Fernández, and Peru's Keiko Fujimori.

Of 13 individual women, 8 were elected to power at least once, the first being Violeta Chamorro in the 1990 Nicaraguan general election in which she defeated Daniel Ortega. Centrists like Laura Chinchilla have also been elected. Michelle Bachelet, Cristina Fernández de Kirchner, and Dilma Rousseff are the only three to have been elected to a second term, and the former two are the only to complete two terms. Elections including the 2013 Chilean presidential election and the 2024 Mexican presidential election have seen two female candidates run against each other.

== List of leaders ==
This list includes women who were elected by national popular vote or ascended to their country's presidency. The list does not include women who served as interim or acting head of state. This list has a strict definition of Latin America (Hispanic or Portuguese speaking countries in continental Latin America), and excludes countries in the Caribbean such as Haiti and French speaking countries on the continent such as French Guiana, or multi cultural and lingual countries like Belize.

Incumbent

Name	Portrait	Country	Office	Mandate start	Mandate end	Term length	Head of state or government	Executive or non-executive
Isabel Perón		Argentina	President	1 July 1974	24 March 1976	1 year, 267 days	Head of state and government	Executive
Lidia Gueiler		Bolivia	President	16 November 1979	17 July 1980	244 days	Head of state and government	Executive
Violeta Chamorro		Nicaragua	President	25 April 1990	10 January 1997	6 years, 260 days	Head of state and government	Executive
Rosalía Arteaga		Ecuador	President	9 February 1997	11 February 1997	2 days	Head of state and government	Executive
Mireya Moscoso		Panama	President	1 September 1999	1 September 2004	5 years, 0 days	Head of state and government	Executive
Michelle Bachelet		Chile	President	11 March 2006	11 March 2010	4 years	Head of state and government	Executive
Michelle Bachelet		Chile	President	11 March 2014	11 March 2018	4 years	Head of state and government	Executive
Cristina Fernández de Kirchner		Argentina	President	10 December 2007	10 December 2015	8 years, 0 days	Head of state and government	Executive
Laura Chinchilla		Costa Rica	President	8 May 2010	8 May 2014	4 years, 0 days	Head of state and government	Executive
Dilma Rousseff		Brazil	President	1 January 2011	31 August 2016	5 years, 243 days	Head of state and government	Executive
Jeanine Áñez		Bolivia	President	12 November 2019	8 November 2020	362 days	Head of state and government	Executive
Xiomara Castro		Honduras	President	27 January 2022	27 January 2026	4 years, 0 days	Head of state and government	Executive
Dina Boluarte		Peru	President	7 December 2022	10 October 2025	2 years, 307 days	Head of state and government	Executive
Claudia Sheinbaum		Mexico	President	1 October 2024	Incumbent	2 years, 14 days	Head of state and government	Executive
Rosario Murillo		Nicaragua	Co-president	18 February 2025	Incumbent	1 year, 239 days	Head of state and government	Executive
Delcy Rodriguez		Venezuela	President	5 January 2026	Incumbent	283 days	Head of state and government	Executive
Laura Fernández Delgado		Costa Rica	President	8 May 2026	Incumbent	160 days	Head of state and government	Executive
Keiko Fujimori		Peru	President	28 July 2026	Incumbent	79 days	Head of state and government	Executive

== See also ==
- List of elected and appointed female state leaders
- List of current heads of state and government
- Women in government
- Pink tide
- Conservative wave
