= Conservative wave =

Political phenomenon in Latin America

Map of Latin America depicting the ruling party of each country by São Paulo Forum affiliation. Red depicts member parties (left-wing) and blue depicts non-member parties (right-wing) in 2011 (left), 2018 (center), and 2026 (right).

The conservative wave (Spanish: ola conservadora; Portuguese: onda conservadora), or blue tide (Spanish: marea azul; Portuguese: maré azul), or the turn to the right (Spanish: giro a la derecha; Portuguese: virada à direita) is a right-wing political phenomenon that occurred in the mid-2010s to the mid-2020s across Latin America as a direct reaction to the pink tide. During the conservative wave, left-wing governments suffered their first major electoral losses in a decade.

In Argentina, Mauricio Macri (liberal-conservative, center-right) succeeded Cristina Fernández de Kirchner (Peronist) in 2015. In Brazil, the impeachment of Dilma Rousseff, a socialist, resulted in her departure and the rise of Vice President Michel Temer to power in 2016, and later to far-right congressman Jair Bolsonaro becoming President of Brazil. In Peru, the conservative economist Pedro Pablo Kuczynski succeeded Ollanta Humala, a socialist and left-wing nationalist. In Chile, the conservative Sebastián Piñera succeeded Michelle Bachelet, a social democrat, in 2018 in the same transition that occurred in 2010. In Bolivia, the conservative Jeanine Áñez succeeded Evo Morales amid the 2019 Bolivian political crisis. In Ecuador, the centre-right conservative banker Guillermo Lasso succeeded the deeply unpopular Lenín Moreno, becoming the first right-wing President of Ecuador in 14 years.

Starting in the 2020s, Pasokification started occurring in Latin America, and right-wing candidates rebounded with a handful of victories, constituting a second conservative wave. In late 2023 and early 2024, right-wing libertarian Javier Milei won the 2023 Argentine presidential election, defeating Peronist Sergio Massa; centre-right businessman Daniel Noboa defeated leftist Luisa González in Ecuador; right-wing politician José Raúl Mulino defeated the incumbent center-left vice president José Gabriel Carrizo in the 2024 Panamanian general election. This trend continued into 2025, with conservative Rodrigo Paz elected President of Bolivia, defeating the ruling socialist MAS in Bolivia for the first time in decades; and the 2025 victory of José Antonio Kast in Chile, as well as that of Nasry Asfura in Honduras. This trend initially continued in 2026, with the left-wing candidates seen as likely to lose to their right-wing challengers and the establishment of the Shield of the Americas in the upcoming elections for that year. In February, conservative populist Laura Fernández Delgado was elected president in Costa Rica, defeating centrist Álvaro Ramos Chaves. In June, right-wing politician Keiko Fujimori defeated left-wing psychologist and politician Roberto Sánchez in Peru, and later that month, hard-right lawyer and businessman Abelardo de la Espriella defeated leftist politician and Senator Iván Cepeda in Colombia; both Fujimori and de la Espriella narrowly won by less than 1% of the vote. However, the consecutive trend was halted with the defeat of Flavio Bolsonaro to left-leaning incumbent Luiz Inacio Lula da Silva in Brazil.

== By country ==
In the late 2010s and early 2020s, the conservative wave began to decline following left-wing victories, starting with the 2018 Mexican general election and the 2020 Bolivian general election, and later the 2021 Peruvian general election, 2021 Chilean presidential election, 2021 Honduran general election, the 2022 Colombian presidential election, which resulted in the first left-wing president in the country's history, and the 2022 Brazilian general election, in which former leftist president Luiz Inácio Lula da Silva, who had his political rights restored, defeated Bolsonaro.

=== Argentina ===
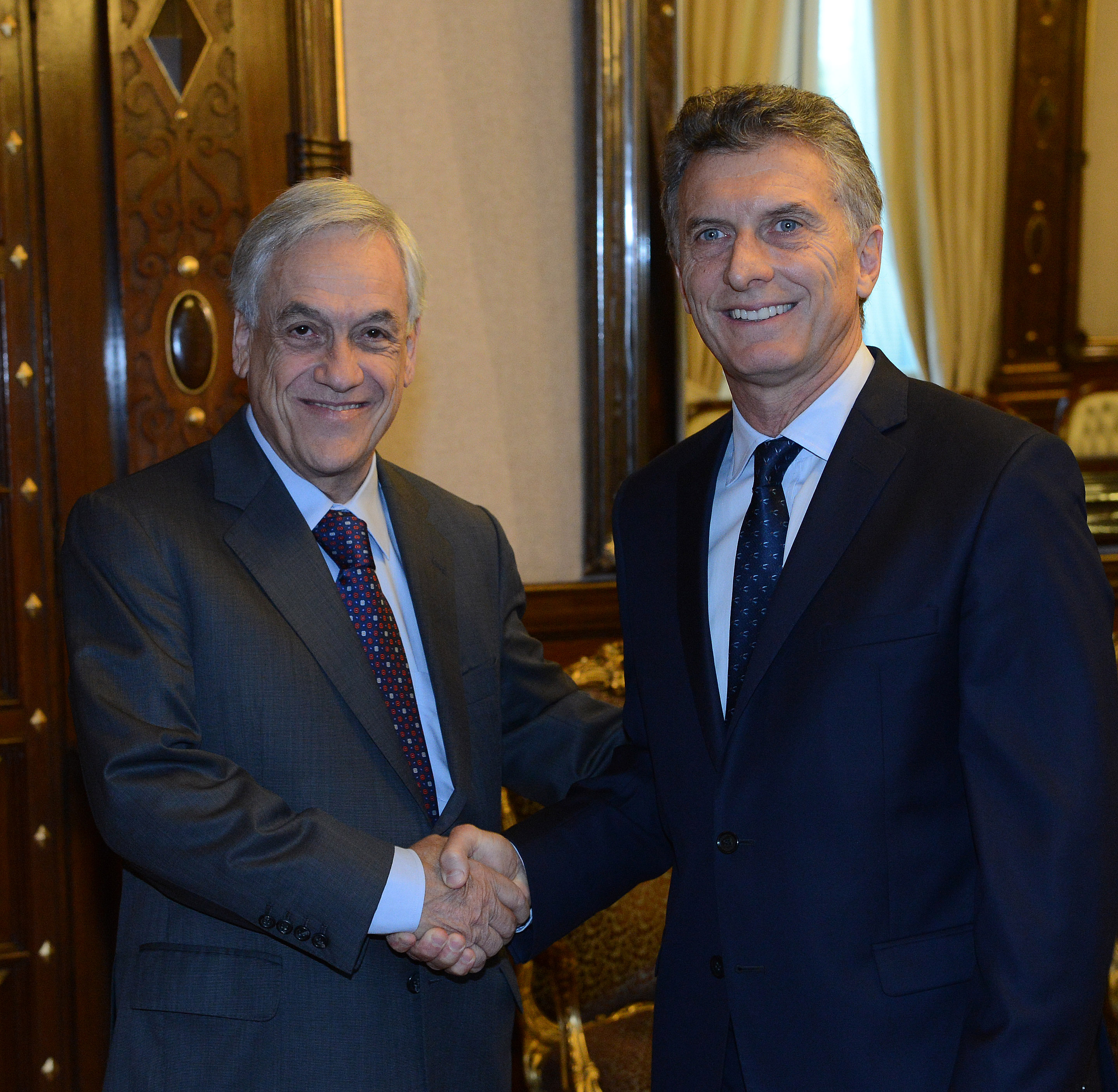
Argentinian former president Mauricio Macri (2015–2019) alongside the Chilean president Sebastián Piñera (2010–2014, 2018–2022).

In Argentina, the election of Mauricio Macri of the centre-right in November 2015 as President of Argentina brought a right-wing government to power, although the populist movements of Peronism and Kirchnerism, which are tied to its leader Cristina Fernández de Kirchner's popularity, initially remained somewhat strong. In October 2017, Macri established a more firm hold on power when many candidates of his Cambiemos party enjoyed victories in the 2017 Argentine legislative election.

In the 2019 Argentine presidential election, Macri lost to the left-leaning Alberto Fernández, who was sworn into office in December 2019. However, right-wing libertarian Javier Milei won the 2023 Argentine presidential election, defeating Peronist Sergio Massa.

=== Brazil ===
In Brazil, a conservative wave began roughly around the time Dilma Rousseff won the 2014 Brazilian presidential election in a tight election, kicking off the fourth term of the Workers' Party in the highest position of government. According to a political analyst at the Inter-Union Department of Parliamentary Advice, Antônio Augusto de Queiroz, the National Congress of Brazil elected in 2014 may be considered the most conservative since the re-democratization movement, citing an increase in the number of parliamentarians linked to more conservative segments, such as ruralists, the military of Brazil, police of Brazil, and religious conservatives. The subsequent economic crisis of 2015 and investigations of corruption scandals led to a right-wing movement that sought to rescue ideas from economic liberalism and conservatism in opposition to left-wing politics. At the same time, young liberals such as those that make up the Free Brazil Movement emerged among many others. For José Manoel Montanha da Silveira Soares, within a single real generation there may be several generations that he called "differentiated and antagonistic". For him, it is not the common birth date that marks a generation, though it matters, but rather the historical moment in which they live in common. In this case, the historical moment was the impeachment of Dilma Rousseff. They can be called the "post-Dilma generation".

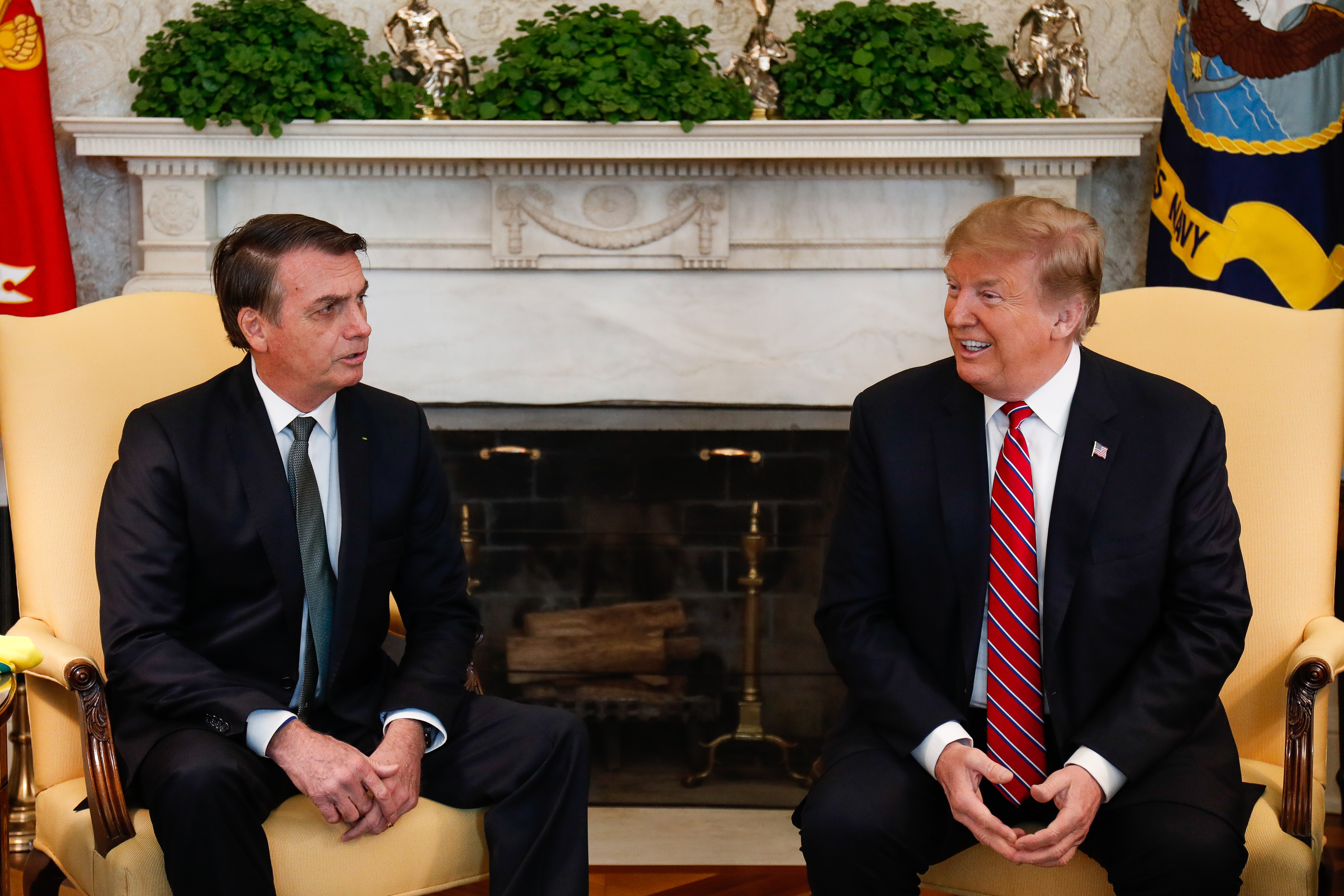
Brazilian President Jair Bolsonaro with President Donald Trump in the White House, March 2019

Centrist interim President Michel Temer took office following the impeachment of Rousseff. Temer held 3% approval ratings in October 2017, facing a corruption scandal after accusations for obstructing justice and racketeering were placed against him. He managed to avoid trial thanks to the support of the right-wing parties in the National Congress. On the other hand, President of the Senate, Renan Calheiros, who was acknowledged as one of the key figures behind Rousseff's destitution and member of the centrist Brazilian Democratic Movement, was himself removed from office after facing embezzlement charges.

Conservative candidate Jair Bolsonaro of the Social Liberal Party was the winner of the 2018 Brazilian presidential election followed by left-wing former mayor of São Paulo, Fernando Haddad, of Luiz Inácio Lula da Silva's Workers' Party. Lula was banned to run after being convicted on criminal corruption charges and being imprisoned. Bolsonaro would later lose to Lula in the 2022 Brazilian presidential election after his political rights were restored, becoming the first sitting president to lose a bid for a second term since the possibility of reelection for an immediately consecutive term became permitted by a constitutional amendment.

=== Ecuador ===
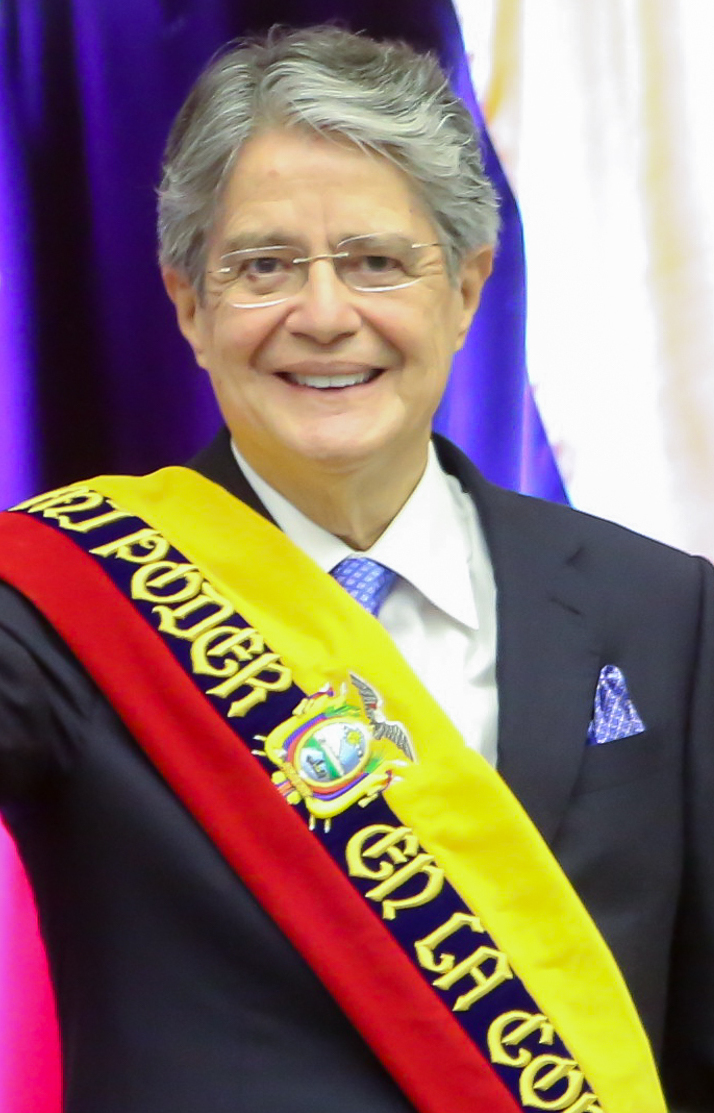
President Guillermo Lasso (2021–2023)

In Ecuador, the policies and legacy of left-wing former President Rafael Correa are controversial. His successor, Lenín Moreno, was elected in the 2017 Ecuadorian general election defeating conservative banker Guillermo Lasso; a recount was needed amid allegations of fraud. The presidency of Moreno was also seen as controversial due to his shift to the centre and neoliberal policies, overseeing controversial austerity measures in petroleum which sparked the 2019 Ecuadorian protests and his mishandling of the COVID-19 pandemic in Ecuador.

In the 2021 Ecuadorian general election, Lasso announced his third presidential campaign and eventually advanced to the run-off by a narrow second-place finish. The election was noted as it saw Lasso, a conservative banker against socialist economist and Correa ally Andrés Arauz. Arauz was seen as the front-runner for the run-off election with him leading in several polls two weeks prior to the election. In the April run-off, Lasso managed to defeat Arauz in what some media called an upset victory after winning 52.4% of the vote, while Arauz won 47.6% of the vote.

During the 2023 general election that took place to replace Lasso as president, businessman and former National Assembly member Daniel Noboa was elected to the presidency. His political ideology has been described as both centrist and centre-right. In April 2025, President Daniel Noboa won re-election to serve a full four-year term.

=== Guatemala ===
In Guatemala, between mid January 1991 until mid January 2008, the country was dominated by centre right and right wing governments that were elected by the people such as Jorge Serrano Elías from 1991 until he resigned and fled to Panama amid a Constitutional crisis on 1 June 1993 when he was replaced by his running mate Gustavo Adolfo Espina Salguero for a few days before Espina was also replaced by Ramiro de León Carpio who won the 1993 election with no opposition and with the support of right wing and far right parties. Between 1996 and 2008, there would be Three right leaning presidents who would serve full 4 Year terms, including Álvaro Arzú from 1996 until 2000 who oversaw the end of the 36 Year Civil War, Alfonso Portillo from 2000 to 2004, and Óscar Berger from 2004 to 2008, However things started to change in 2007 when social democratic leader Álvaro Colom of the centre-left National Unity of Hope was elected president in the 2007 Guatemalan general election, being the only modern day leftist president in the country and the first leftist president since the overthrow of Jacobo Árbenz in 1954. Colom's successor, right-wing Otto Pérez Molina of the Patriotic Party, was forced to resign his presidency due to popular unrest, as well as corruption scandals that ended with his arrest. Following Molina's resignation, right-wing Jimmy Morales was elected into office following the 2015 Guatemalan general election. As of 2026, he was under investigation for illegal financing. Morales successor Alejandro Giammattei also experienced massive popular unrest, resulting in the 2020 Guatemalan protests. In 2023, centre left politician and member of the Semilla party Bernardo Arévalo beated former first lady Sandra Torres in a landslide, becoming the first left leaning or leftist president in 12 Years.

=== Honduras ===
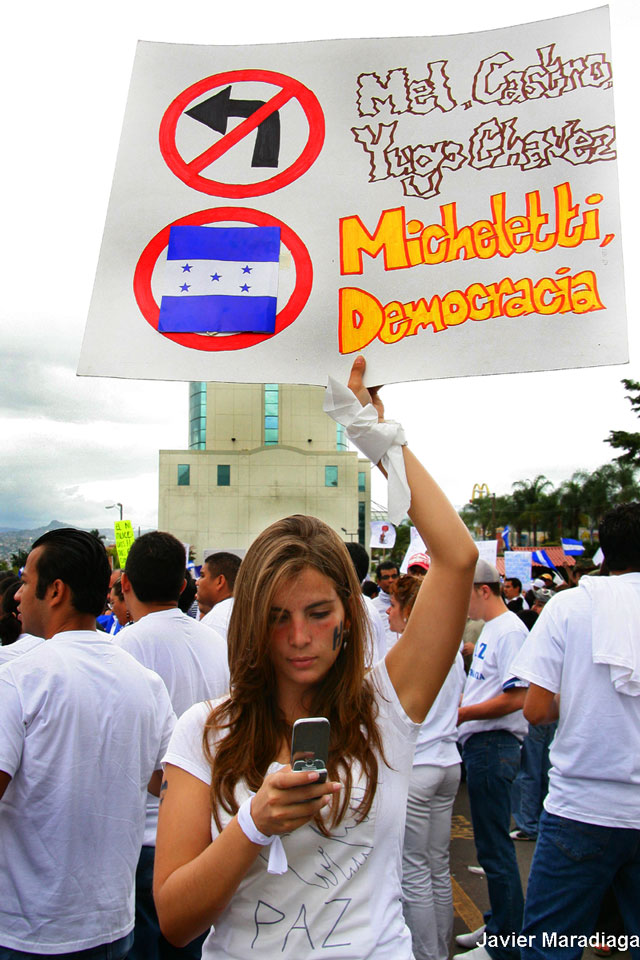
Honduran demonstrator holding a banner with a "don't turn left" sign, 2009

In Honduras, Manuel Zelaya's turn to the left during his tenure resulted in the 2009 Honduran coup d'état, which was condemned by the entire region, including the United States. Years later after the coup, Zelaya said his overthrow was the beginning of the "conservative restoration" in Latin America.

After the coup, the next democratically elected president was right-wing Porfirio Lobo Sosa (2010–2014), then right-wing Juan Orlando Hernández of the conservative National Party of Honduras won the 2013 Honduran presidential election over left-wing Xiomara Castro (Zelaya's wife) by a slight margin. Soon after, Hernández reformed the Constitution of Honduras to allow himself to be candidate for immediate reelection (something until then forbidden by Honduran law) and ran as candidate for the 2017 Honduran presidential election in what some observers question as undemocratic, authoritarian-leaning, and corrupt.

During the election, Hernández' tight self-proclaimed victory over Salvador Nasralla of the opposition alliance, alongside accusations of voter fraud, caused massive riots throughout Honduras. The declaration of a curfew from the country was labeled as illegal by some jurists, and the violent repression of the protests left at least seven dead and dozens injured. Due to the general popular unrest and voter fraud allegations, the Organization of American States requested a new election to no avail.

Castro would eventually win the 2021 Honduran presidential election with Nasralla as her running mate, while Hernández was arrested and extradited on request of the United States for alleged involvement with the illegal narcotics trade. In the 2025 elections, Nasry Asfura, a businessman and member of the right-wing National Party who previously served as the mayor of Tegucigalpa from 2014 to 2022 and previously ran for the 2021 general election, ran again but this time, against TV host man and former vice president Salvador Nasralla, a member of the centrist Liberal Party and also against teacher and former defense minister Rixi Moncada, a member of the left-wing LIBRE Party.

On 28 November 2025, just two days before the election, U.S. President Donald Trump released a statement on Truth Social announcing his full endorsement to Nasry "Tito" Asfura and warned that if Asfura did not win the election, the U.S. would suspend all of its aid to Honduras. Trump also said that he would pardon former president Juan Orlando Hernández who was imprisoned in mid February 2022 and in late June 2024, was sentenced to 45 years over widespread reports that Hernández planned to bring in 500 tons of cocaine into the United States. Hernández was released on 2 December 2025 after spending just over three years in jail. The full reporting of the results took 24 days to complete due to the malfunctioning of computers counting the votes, as well as allegations of electoral fraud. Reports before it hit 99.5% showed both rightist Asfura in a statistical tie with centrist Nasralla and winning nearly two times more votes than leftist Moncada. When reports of the 2025 election were fully complete, Asfura won the election, winning a small lead over Nasralla. In January 2026, Nasry Asfura was sworn in as president of Honduras.

=== Paraguay ===
In Paraguay, the conservative, right-wing Colorado Party ruled the country for over sixty years, including the dictatorship of Alfredo Stroessner that lasted thirty-five years, from 1954 to 1989, and was supported by the United States.

Paraguay is one of the poorest countries of South America and least developed countries according to the Human Development Index. This dominant-party system was temporarily broken in the 2008 Paraguayan general election, when practically the entire opposition united in the Patriotic Alliance for Change managed to elect Fernando Lugo, a former Bishop and member of the Christian Democratic Party, as President of Paraguay. Lugo's government was praised for its social reforms, including investments in low-income housing, the introduction of free treatment in public hospitals, the introduction of cash transfers for Paraguay's most impoverished citizens, and indigenous rights. Nevertheless, Lugo did not finish his period as he was impeached, despite enjoying very high approval ratings and popularity. The impeachment of Lugo was rejected by the Inter-American Commission on Human Rights, condemned by both right-wing and left-wing governments, and considered a coup d'état by UNASUR and Mercosur, which responded with sanctions and suspensions for Paraguay. Lugo was later elected to the Senate of Paraguay and became President of the Senate. He was replaced by Vice President Federico Franco, who was distanced from Lugo by ideological reasons, opposed to the entry of Venezuela into the Mercosur, and was described as conservative.

President Santiago Peña together with U.S. Secretary of State Marco Rubio, 2025.

The country's next democratically elected president after the 2013 Paraguayan general election, right-wing Horacio Cartes of the Colorado Party, described by human rights organizations as authoritarian and homophobic, attempted to reform the Constitution of Paraguay to allow himself to be re-elected indefinitely, which caused popular uproar and the 2017 Paraguayan crisis. He served until 2018, and his successor following the 2018 Paraguayan general election was fellow conservative Mario Abdo Benítez, who was in turn succeeded by the next conservative president, Santiago Peña, who took office from 2023 to 2026.

=== Peru ===
In Peru, Pedro Pablo Kuczynski won the 2016 Peruvian presidential election, with Peru becoming yet another country that departed from a centre-left government. In this election, the third candidate with major support was leftist candidate Verónika Mendoza of the Broad Front with 18% of votes. Following corruption investigations surrounding Odebrecht, the Congress of the Republic of Peru demanded Kuczynski to defend himself in a session, with Marcelo Odebrecht stating that Kuczynski's involvement with the company was legal compared to the illegalities performed by his leftist predecessor. Due to the corruption scandal, the first impeachment process against Pedro Pablo Kuczynski was started, but voted against by a slight margin in Congress.

After the Kenjivideos scandal in which videos were leaked to the public showing bribery from the Fujimorists to keep Kuczynski in office, Kuczyinski resigned on his own. Kuczynski's successor, centrist Martin Vizcarra, changed policies. Amid the 2019 Peruvian constitutional crisis, he dissolved Congress on 30 September, which angered Fujimorists. In the 2020 Peruvian parliamentary election, the main opposition parties Peruvian Aprista Party and Popular Force lost the majority in congress. The removal of Martín Vizcarra began after accuses of corruption. Many centrists and leftists were angry, as the conservative Manuel Merino took power in his place. This led to the 2020 Peruvian protests, and Merino resigned from office. Centrist Francisco Sagasti succeeded him. In the days leading to the run-off of the 2021 Peruvian presidential election, conservative candidate Keiko Fujimori had a slight lead in the polls over socialist candidate Pedro Castillo. On 19 July, Castillo was declared the winner in a close and highly contested election. However, president Castillo was removed from office by Congress on 7 December 2022. On 10 October 2025, after days of protests and Mantaining very low approval ratings throughout her presidency, Peru's independent female president Dina Boluarte was removed from office and was replaced by 38 year old José Jerí, a member of the right–wing Somos Peru party, who was previously a member of the Peruvian Congress and served as the president of the congress from 26 July 2025. However, in Mid February 2026, Jerí was removed from office and was replaced by José María Balcázar.

In June 2026, right-wing politician Keiko Fujimori, the eldest daughter of former Peruvian president Alberto Fujimori, defeated leftist politician Roberto Sánchez Palomino in the 2026 Peruvian general election. In July 2026, Keiko Fujimori was sworn in as Peru’s president.

== Reception ==
=== In Brazil ===
On the political changes that were happening in the country, a collection of twenty essays organized by Felipe Demier and Rejane Hoeveler, titled The Conservative Wave – Essays on the Current Dark Times in Brazil, was launched in 2016. In the synopsis, it is emphasized the rootedness of reactionary thinking and practices in Brazilian state powers and Brazilian society in multiple dimensions as well as the challenges that the left will have to face. Many Brazilians who support Jair Bolsonaro's government believe that the Workers' Party and rampant corruption in Brazil are to blame for difficulties in the economy.

== Timeline ==
The timeline starts before the wave to illustrate the long-term increase in conservative governments.

== See also ==
- Cuban dissident movement
- Evangelical political parties in Latin America
- Hispanic and Latino conservatism in the United States
- Pacific Alliance
- Pasokification
- Political influence of Evangelicalism in Latin America
- Forum for the Progress and Integration of South America (PROSUL)
- Venezuelan opposition
