= President of Costa Rica =

Head of state and government

President of the Republic of Costa Rica
- Presidenta de la República de Costa Rica
- Coat of arms of Costa Rica

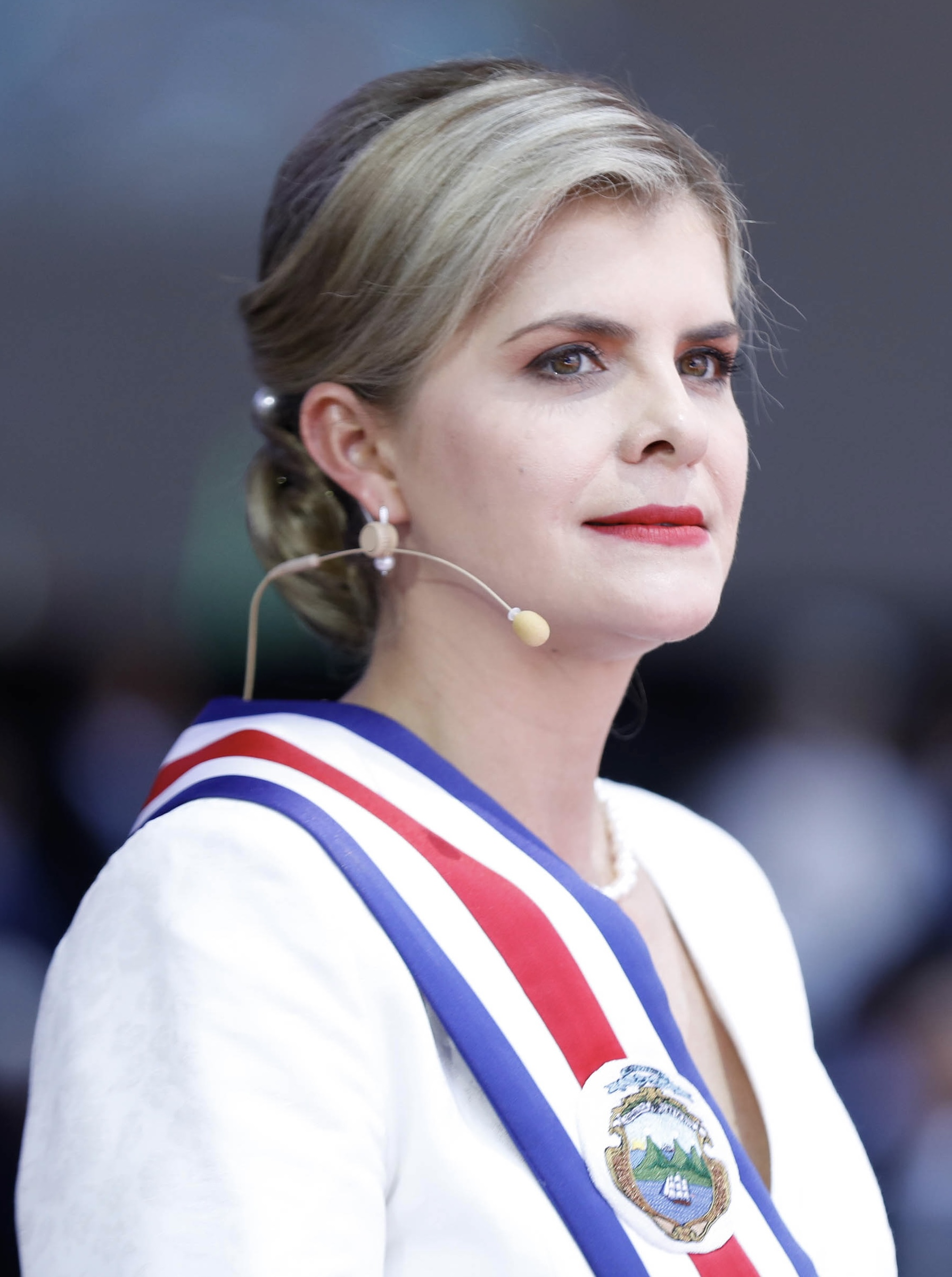
- Incumbent; Laura Fernández since May 8, 2026
- Executive branch of the Government of Costa Rica
- Style: Mr./Madam President (Señor/a Presidente/a) (informal); The Most Excellent (Excelentísimo/a Señor/a) (diplomatic); His/Her Excellency (Su Excelencia) (diplomatic)
- Type: Head of state Head of government
- Residence: Casa Presidencial de Costa Rica
- Seat: San José, Costa Rica
- Term length: Four years, renewable non-consecutively
- Constituting instrument: Constitution of Costa Rica (1949)
- Inaugural holder: José María Castro Madriz
- Formation: August 31, 1848 (178 years ago)
- Deputy: Vice Presidents
- Salary: ₡5,124,387 / US$10,110 monthly
- Website: presidencia.go.cr (in Spanish)

The president of the Republic of Costa Rica is the head of state and head of government of Costa Rica. The president is currently elected in direct elections for a period of four years, which is not immediately renewable. Two vice presidents are elected in the same ticket with the president. The president appoints the Council of Ministers. Due to the abolition of the military of Costa Rica in 1948, the president is not a commander-in-chief, unlike the norm in most other countries, although the Constitution does describe them as commander-in-chief of the civil defense public forces.

From 1969 to 2005, the president was barred from seeking reelection. After the amendment banning reelection was overturned by the Supreme Court in 2005, an incumbent president became eligible to run again after waiting for at least eight years after leaving office.

== Election ==
The President of Costa Rica is elected using a modified two-round system in which a candidate must receive at least 40% of the vote to win in the first round; if no candidate wins in the first round, a runoff is held between the two candidates with the largest number of votes.

== Qualifications ==
According to Article 131 of the Constitution, The following is required to be president or vice president of the Republic:

# To be Costa Rican by birth and a citizen in exercise;

1. To have secular status; (Note: That is, not a priest or other cleric)
2. To be older than thirty years.

== Attributes and duties ==
According to article 139 of the Constitution of Costa Rica, the following powers are exclusive attributes of the president:

# To freely appoint and remove the ministers of government;

1. To represent the Nation in the acts of official character;
2. To exercise the supreme command of the public force;
3. To present to the Legislative Assembly, at the initiation of the first annual period of sessions, a written message relative to the various matters of the Administration and the political state of the Republic and in which he must, additionally, propose the measures that he judges important for the good functioning of the Government and the progress and well-being of the Nation;
4. To previously communicate to the Legislative Assembly, when he intends to leave the country, the motives for his trip.

Article 140 gives the president the following duties alongside the respective minister:

# To freely appoint and to remove the members of the public force, the employees and functionaries who serve offices of confidence, and the others that, in very qualified cases, the Law of [the] Civil Service determines;

1. To appoint and to remove, subject to the requirements provided by the Law of [the] Civil Service, the rest of the [public] servants of their dependency;
2. To sanction and promulgate the laws, regulate them, execute them, and see to their exact fulfillment;
3. In the recesses of the Legislative Assembly, to decree the suspension of [the] rights and guarantees that paragraph 7) of Article 121 refers to[,] in the same cases and with the same limitations established there[,] and immediately give account to the Assembly. The decree of suspension of guarantees is equivalent, ipso facto, to the convocation of the Assembly to sessions, which must meet within the following forty-eight hours. If the Assembly does not confirm the measure by two-thirds of the votes of the totality of its members, the guarantees will be considered restored. If because of lack of quorum the Assembly cannot meet, it will do so the next day with any number of Deputies. In this case, the decree of the Executive Power needs to be approved by [a] vote of no less than the two-thirds part of those present;
4. To exercise the initiative in the formation of the laws, and the right of veto;
5. To maintain the order and the tranquility of the Nation, to take the necessary measures [providencias] for the guarding of the public liberties;
6. To provide for the collection and the investment of the national incomes in accordance with the laws;
7. To see to the good functioning of the administrative services and dependencies;
8. To execute and to have fulfilled all that decided [on] or provided [for] in the matters of their competence [by] the tribunals of Justice and the electoral organs, at the solicitation of the same;
9. To celebrate agreements, public treaties, and concordats, to promulgate them, and execute them once approved by the Legislative Assembly or by a Constituent Assembly when that approval is required by this Constitution. The protocols derived from those public treaties or international agreements that do not require legislative approval will enter into force once promulgated by the Executive Power.
10. To render to the Legislative Assembly the reports that it solicits from them is the use of its attributions;
11. To direct the international relations of the Republic;
12. To receive the Heads of State as well as the diplomatic representatives, and to admit the Consuls of other nations;
13. To convoke the Legislative Assembly to ordinary and extraordinary sessions;
14. To send to the Legislative Assembly the bill of National Budget at the time and with the requirements determined in this Constitution;
15. To dispose of the public force to preserve the order, defense, and security of the country;
16. To issue navigation licenses;
17. To give themselves the appropriate regulations for the internal regime of their offices and to issue the other regulations and ordinances necessary for the prompt execution of the laws;
18. To subscribe the administrative contracts not included in paragraph 14) of Article 121 of this Constitution, under reserve of submitting them to the approval of the Legislative Assembly when they stipulate [the] exemption of taxes or rates, or [when] they have for their object the exploitation of public services, natural resources or wealth of the State.
19. The legislative approval of these contracts will not give them character of laws nor will exempt them from their administrative juridical regime. That provided in this paragraph will not be applicable to the loans or other similar agreements, referred to in paragraph 15) of Article 121, which will be governed by their special norms;
20. To fulfill the other duties and to exercise the other attributions that this Constitution and the laws confer to them.

== Limitations ==
The Constitution also establishes limitations on the president's powers which can be prosecuted if broken.

Article 148.

The President of the Republic will be responsible for the use he makes of those attributions that according to this Constitution correspond to him in an exclusive form. Each Minister of Government will be jointly responsible with the President[,] in respect to the exercise of the attributions that this Constitution grants to both of them. The responsibility for the acts of the Council of Government will extend to all those who concurred with their vote to adopt the respective agreement.

Article 149

The President of the Republic and the Minister of Government who had participated in the acts indicated as follows will also be jointly responsible:

1. When they compromise in any form the freedom, the political independence, or the territorial integrity of the Republic;
2. When they impede or obstruct directly or indirectly the popular elections, or infringe upon the principles of alternation in the exercise of the Presidency or of free presidential succession, or against the freedom, order, or purity of the suffrage;
3. When they impede or obstruct the functions that are specific to the Legislative Assembly or restrict its freedom and independence;
4. When they refuse to publish or execute the laws or other legislative acts;
5. When they impede or obstruct the functions specific to the Judicial Power, or [when they] restrict the freedom with which the Tribunals must judge the causes submitted to their decision, or when they obstruct in some form the functions that correspond to the electoral organs or the municipalities;
6. For all the other cases in which the Executive Power by action or omission violates some expressed law.

== Latest election ==
Candidate	Running mate	Party	Votes	%
Laura Fernández Delgado	Francisco Gamboa Soto; Douglas Soto Campos	Sovereign People's Party	1,191,727	48.30
Álvaro Ramos Chaves	Karen Segura Fernández; Xinia Chaves Quirós	National Liberation Party	825,041	33.44
Claudia Dobles Camargo	Andrea Centeno Rodríguez; Luis Felipe Arauz	Citizens' Agenda Coalition	119,700	4.85
Ariel Robles	Margarita Salas Guzmán; Guillermo Arroyo Muñoz	Broad Front	92,826	3.76
Juan Carlos Hidalgo	Yolanda Fernández Ochoa; Steven Barrantes	Social Christian Unity Party	68,732	2.79
Fabricio Alvarado Muñoz	David Segura Gamboa; Rosalía Brown Young	New Republic Party	53,797	2.18
José Aguilar Berrocal	Evita Arguedas Maklouf; Marcela Ortiz Bonilla	Forward	43,968	1.78
Natalia Díaz Quintana	Jorge Ernesto Ocampo; Luis Diego Vargas	United We Can	21,126	0.86
Eliécer Feinzaig Mintz	Tania Molina Rojas; Gabriel Zamora Baudrit	Progressive Liberal Party	11,179	0.45
Luz Mary Alpízar Loaiza	Frank Mckenzie Peterkin; Maritza Bustamante Venegas	Social Democratic Progress Party	8,809	0.36
Fernando Zamora	Lisbeth Quesada Tristán; Yeudy Sulem Araya	New Generation Party	5,992	0.24
Ana Virginia Calzada	Oldemar Rodríguez Rojas; Heilen Díaz Gutiérrez	Democratic and Social Center Party	5,659	0.23
Luis Amador Jiménez	Jorge Borbón; Katya Berdugo Ulate	National Integration Party	4,433	0.18
Wálter Hernández Juárez	Shirley González Mora; Eduardo Rojas Murillo	Costa Rican Social Justice Party	3,414	0.14
David Hernández Brenes	Obeth Morales Barquero; Jeimy Castro Valverde	Workers' Party	2,737	0.11
Boris Molina	Edgardo Morales Romero; Maricela Morales Mora	Costa Rican Democratic Union Party	1,995	0.08
Claudio Alpízar Otoya	Andrés Castillo Saborío; Nora González Chacón	National Hope Party	1,801	0.07
Marco Rodríguez	Carlos Palacios Franco; Fabiola Romero Cruz	Hope and Freedom Party	1,550	0.06
Ronny Castillo	Hazel Arias Mata; William Anderson Lewis	Costa Rica Rules Here	1,442	0.06
Douglas Caamaño Quirós	Lissa Freckleton Owens; Carlos Moya Bonilla	Costa Rica First Alliance	1,419	0.06
Total			2,467,347	100.00
Valid votes			2,467,347	98.91
Invalid/blank votes			27,264	1.09
Total votes			2,494,611	100.00
Registered voters/turnout			3,611,182	69.08
Source: TSE

== See also ==
- Politics of Costa Rica
- List of political parties in Costa Rica
- History of Costa Rica
