= Álvaro Ramos =

Álvaro Ramos may refer to:

- Álvaro Ramos Chaves (born 1983), Costa Rican politician, runner-up in the 2026 general election
- Álvaro Ramos (footballer) (born 1992), Chilean footballer
- Álvaro Ramos Trigo (born 1950), Uruguayan agronomist and politician
