= Ministry of Environment and Energy (Costa Rica) =

Government ministry of Costa Rica

- Ministerio de Ambiente y Energía
- Abbreviation: MINAE
- Predecessor: Ministerio de Recursos Naturales, Energía y Minas
- Formation: October 4, 1995; 31 years ago
- Type: Governmental
- Legal status: Ministry
- Headquarters: Calle 25A, 10104 Barrio González Lahmann, Catedral, San José
- Official language: Spanish
- Minister: Mónica Navarro del Valle
- Website: https://minae.go.cr/

The Ministry of Environment and Energy (Spanish: Ministerio de Ambiente y Energía, MINAE) is a ministry or department of the government of Costa Rica. As the name implies, it administers conservation efforts in Costa Rican national parks, develops energy sources, and regulates mining operations. In May 2026, Mónica Navarro del Valle was appointed by President Laura Fernández Delgado as Minister.

== Agencies ==
- SINAC Sistemas Nacional de Areas de Conservación - National System of Conservation Areas
- DGGM Dirección de Geología y Minas - Geology and Mining General Directorate
- SETENA Secretaría Técnica Nacional Ambiental - National Technical Environmental Secretariat
- TAA Tribunal Ambiental Administrativo - Environmental Administrative Tribunal
- OCIC Oficina Costarricense de Implementación Conjunta - Costa Rican Office on Joint Implementation
- FONAFIFO Fondo Nacional de Financiamiento Forestal - National Forest Fund
- DGH Dirección General de Hidrocarburos - General Directorate for Hydrocarbons
- IMN Instituto Meteorológico Nacional - National Meteorological Institute
- CONAGEBIO Comisión Nacional para la Gestión de la Biodiversidad - National Commission for Biodiversity Management
- PMP Parque Marino del Pacífico - Marine Park of the Pacific
