= Ariel Robles =

Costa Rican politician (born 1991)

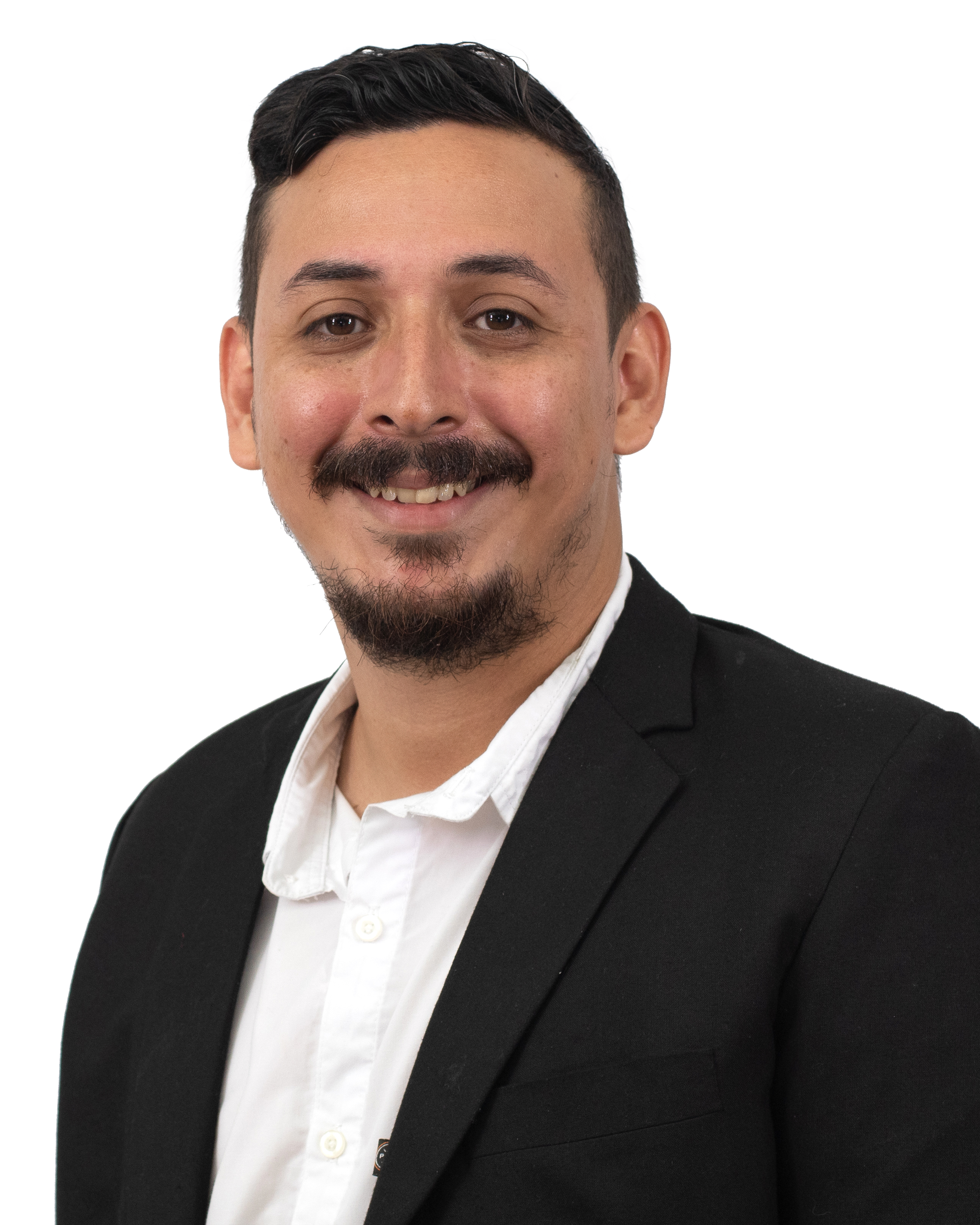

Member of the Legislative Assembly of Costa Rica
- In office 1 May 2022 – 30 April 2026
- Constituency: San José

Personal details
- Born: Andrés Ariel Robles Barrantes; 18 August 1991 (age 35) San Isidro de El General, Costa Rica
- Party: Broad Front
- Education: National University of Costa Rica
- Profession: Academic

Andrés Ariel Robles Barrantes (born 18 August 1991) is a Costa Rican politician and former member of the Legislative Assembly of Costa Rica. A member of the Broad Front, he represented San José from May 2022 to April 2026.

== Early life ==
Robles was born on 18 August 1991 in San Isidro de El General, Costa Rica. He was educated at the Liceo Aeropuerto Jerusalén, Pérez Zeledón. He has a Bachelor's Degree in English teaching (2014), and two Master's Degrees in educational management (2016 and 2022) from the National University of Costa Rica.

== Career ==
Robles was an assistant at the National University's regional campus in Brunca from 2015 to 2016, working on the Promoting Community Social Capital and Indigenous Safeguarding projects. Since 2016 he has been teaching at the university's campus in Brunca and Coto. He has also worked as an English language sports commentator and a political promoter for the Broad Front.

Robles was the Broad Front's youth co-ordinator in Pérez Zeledón (2013–15) and treasurer of the party's branch in Pérez Zeledón (2017–21). He was a candidate in the 2016 municipal elections and 2018 general election. He was a member of the municipal council in Pérez Zeledón from 2020 to 2022. He was elected to the Legislative Assembly of Costa Rica at the 2022 general election. He was the Broad Front's presidential candidate in the 2026 general election. Robles's platform included placing police forces where they should be, in order to stop drug smuggling into Costa Rica; increasing education funding; and reinstating technical standards of therapeutic abortions to protect women's lives. At the election on 1 February 2026 Robles came fourth after receiving 3.76% of the votes.
