= Corruption in Costa Rica =

Corruption in Costa Rica is generally low and is regarded as having the best record in Central America. Its anti-corruption laws are generally well enforced. However, there are persistent problems with high-level corruption and most notably, every president who has taken office since the 1990s has faced allegations of corrupt behavior.

== Background ==
Rising corruption became a matter of grave concern to the people of Costa Rica in the early 2000s when a newly assertive press reporting on government corruption sparked public outrage. Strides have been made in combatting corruption through the introduction of robust laws and anti-corruption agencies by successive governments. A free and sophisticated investigative press and independent prosecutors are working hard to clamp down on official corruption. However, state agencies combatting corruption are allocated limited resources, hindering their ability to fight corruption. Another concern is the increasing influence of wealthy drug cartels in the region.

On Transparency International's 2025 Corruption Perceptions Index, Costa Rica scored 56 on a scale from 0 ("highly corrupt") to 100 ("very clean"). When ranked by score, Costa Rica ranked 46th among the 182 countries in the Index, where the country ranked first is perceived to have the most honest public sector. For comparison with regional scores, the best score among the countries of the Americas (Note: Argentina, Bahamas, Barbados, Belize, Bolivia, Brazil, Canada, Chile, Colombia, Costa Rica, Cuba, Dominica, Dominican Republic, Ecuador, El Salvador, Grenada, Guatemala, Guyana, Haiti, Honduras, Jamaica, Mexico, Nicaragua, Panama, Paraguay, Peru, Saint Lucia, Saint Vincent and the Grenadines, Suriname, Trinidad and Tobago, United States of America, Uruguay, Venezuela) was 75, the average score was 42 and the worst score was 10. For comparison with worldwide scores, the best score was 89 (ranked 1), the average score was 42, and the worst score was 9 (ranked 181, in a two-way tie).

== Instances of high-level corruption ==
A major scandal shook Costa Rica in June 2020. It was discovered that private companies offered luxurious houses and cars to state officials in exchange for preferential treatment. Constructors used false invoices as well as inflated prices as a means to factor in the bribe paid to state officials, which stood at 78 billion Colones or $125 million. A top aide of then-President Carlos Alvarado Quesada was also associated with this scandal, who shortly resigned afterwards.

Judicial officials have also been implicated in major corruption scandals. A judge and a member of Costa Rica's national police force were arrested in connection with being involved in the activities of a major drug trafficking and criminal organization in December 2020. A month earlier, a judge and judicial assistant were arrested for their alleged collaboration with drug traffickers. A 2020 report from Costa Rica's state of the nation program showed that only one in ten complaints regarding corruption made it to trial, raising concerns for impunity.

== Legal and Institutional framework ==
Costa Rica faced a serious challenge in fighting against corruption due to the lack of a leading anti-corruption agency. Many legislative agendas were envisioned to fight against corruption, but those proposals have not been turned into laws.

There were no strong mechanisms for asset recovery. Besides, protection for whistleblowers is also limited. Costa Rica also lacks an access to information law.
