= 2026 Costa Rican general election =

- 1 February 2026
- Presidential election
- Registered: 3,731,788
- Turnout: 69.22% (▲9.25pp)
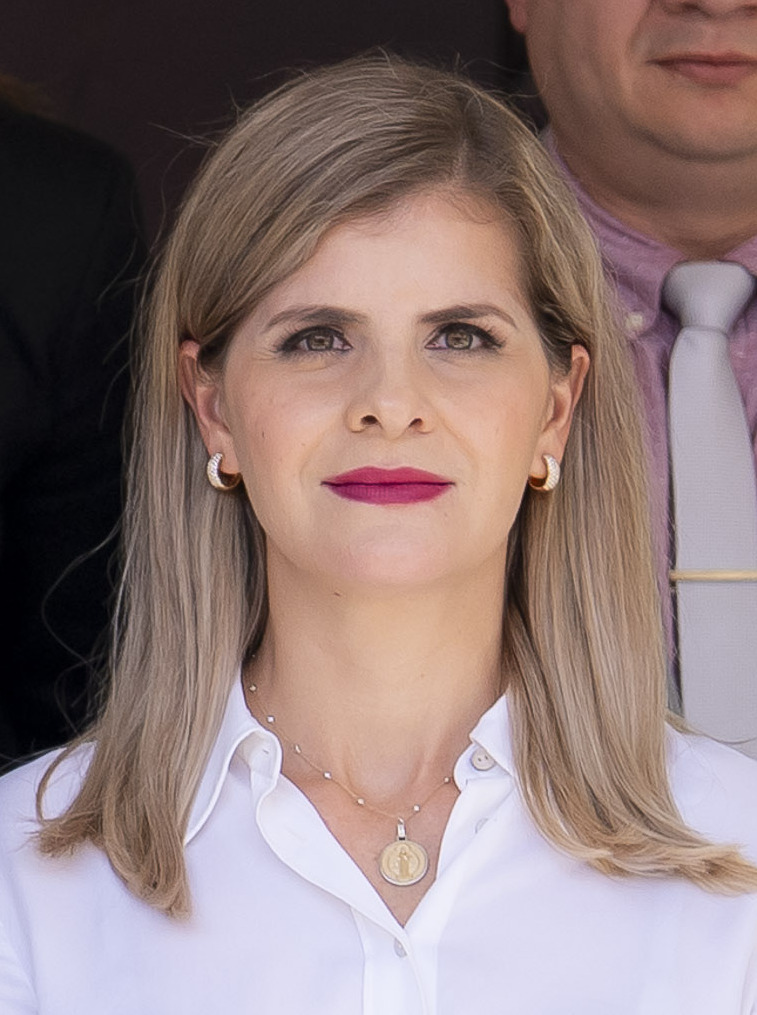

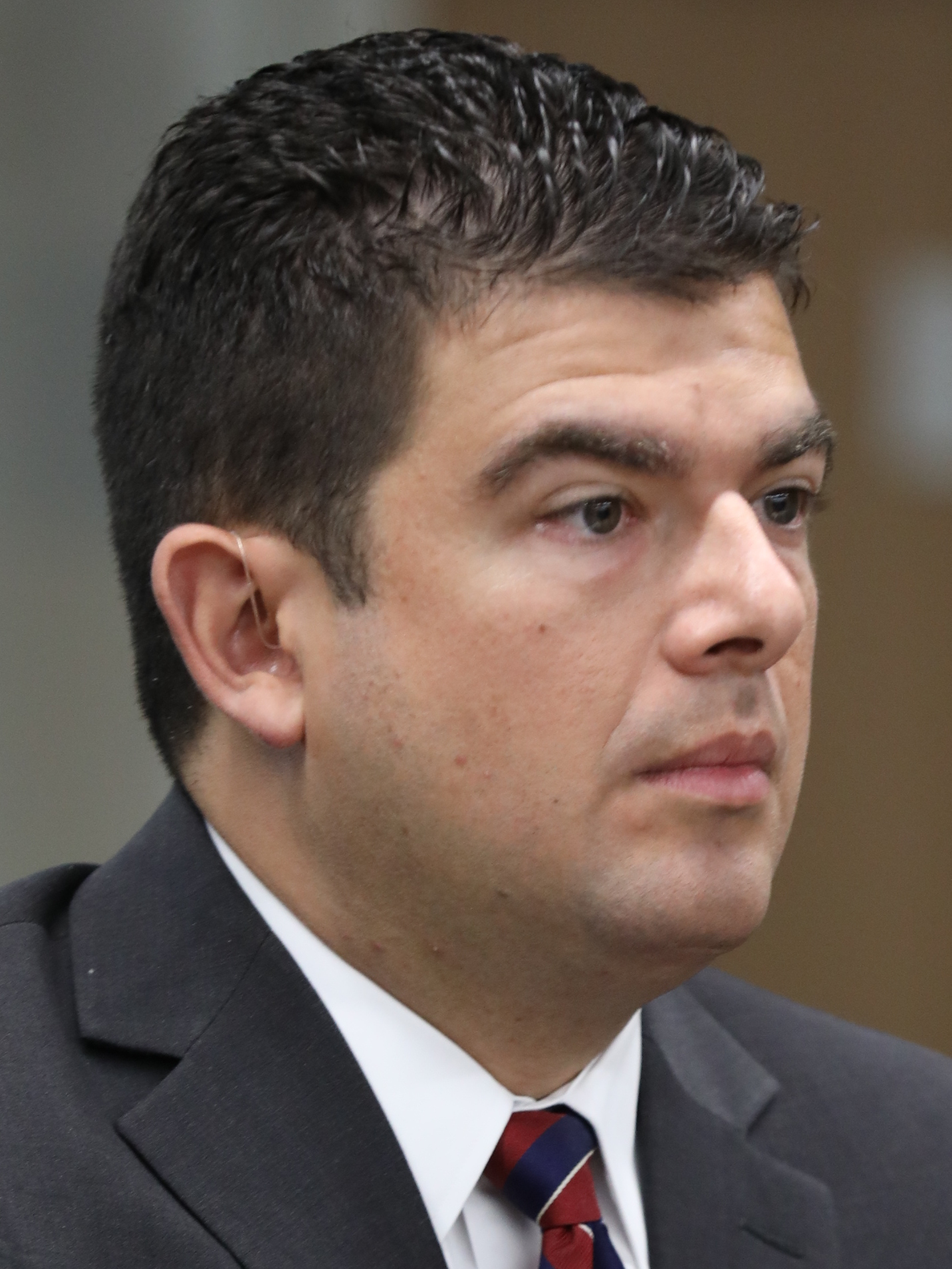
Nominee	Laura Fernández	Álvaro Ramos Chaves
Party	PPSO	PLN
Running mate	Francisco Gamboa; Douglas Soto	Karen Segura; Xinia Chaves
Popular vote	1,243,141	861,879
Percentage	48.53%	33.65%
- Result by district Fernández (1748) Ramos (354) Dobles (1) Robles (1) Hidalgo (7) Alvarado (7) Zamora (1) Tie (10) No votes (1)
President before election
Rodrigo Chaves Robles
PPSD
Elected President
Laura Fernández Delgado
PPSO
- Legislative election
- All 57 seats in the Legislative Assembly; 29 seats needed for a majority
- Turnout: 70.15% (▲9.50pp)
Party	Leader	Vote %	Seats	+/–
PPSO	Laura Fernández	45.20	31	New
PLN	Álvaro Ramos Chaves	23.25	17	−2
FA	Ariel Robles	12.33	7	+1
PUSC	Juan Carlos Hidalgo	4.52	1	−8
PAC–ADN	Claudia Dobles	4.07	1	+1
This lists parties that won seats. See the complete results below.
Results by province

General elections were held in Costa Rica on 1 February 2026 to elect the president, two vice-presidents, and all 57 deputies of the Legislative Assembly.

Laura Fernández, the candidate of the Sovereign People's Party (PPSO), won the presidential election with 48.53% of the votes, defeating Álvaro Ramos Chaves of the National Liberation Party (PLN) and 18 other candidates in the first round. This exceeded the threshold of 40% required to win the election in a single round. She is the second woman to be elected president of Costa Rica.

The PPSO also won a majority of the seats in the Legislative Assembly (the first time since 1990 that a single party had done so): 31, against the PLN's 17. The Broad Front (FA) won seven, with the two remaining seats going to the Citizen Agenda Coalition (CAC) and the Social Christian Unity Party (PUSC), the latter of which obtained its worst electoral result since its foundation in 1983.

== Background ==
The victory of businessman Rodrigo Chaves in the 2022 general election caused a major political shift, as he was a candidate outside the traditional parties and opposed to the classic institutional system. Despite good macroeconomic indicators during his administration, especially due to economic growth and record exports, the reduction in unemployment and poverty, and the fall in inflation, Chaves maintained tensions with the other branches of the state, especially the Supreme Electoral Court (TSE). On 7 September 2025, the TSE asked the Legislative Assembly to lift Chaves' immunity so that he could be prosecuted for fifteen complaints received for political belligerence, that is, for using his position to favour a party in the elections. In December 2025 the Legislative Assembly rejected removing Chaves' immunity. He also faced corruption accusations by the Supreme Court.

At the same time, Costa Rica experienced an unprecedented increase in violence associated with drug trafficking and organised crime, which damaged the country's historical image as a peaceful democracy. This deterioration in security became the main concern for citizens and dominated public debate. In 2024, the Costa Rican Constitution was amended to allow for the extradition of drug traffickers and domestic terrorists wanted by foreign authorities.

Chaves maintained a historic approval rating, although between October 2025 and January 2026 it fell from 63% to 58% and obtained a 28% disapproval rating, 8 points higher, according to the Centre for Political Research and Studies (CIEP) at the University of Costa Rica. He was ineligible to run in 2026, as the constitution limits the consecutive re-election of presidents, who are eligible to run for office eight years after the end of their term.

== Electoral system ==
The president of Costa Rica is elected using a modified two-round system in which a candidate must receive at least 40% of the vote to win in the first round; if no candidate wins in the first round, a runoff is held between the two candidates with most votes. Each presidential candidate shares the ballot with two vice-presidential candidates.

The 57 members of the Legislative Assembly of Costa Rica are elected using a closed list voting system with proportional representation through the largest remainder method from seven multi-member constituencies which are based on the seven provinces, allocated seats based on population (in this election the constituencies varied between five and 18 seats). Overseas voters may cast ballots in the presidential election, but not for members of the Legislative Assembly.

== Presidential candidates ==
The following table shows the candidates nominated by the eligible parties:

Party		Ideology	Ticket		
Party		Ideology	President	1st Vice President	2nd Vice President
Broad Front		Democratic socialism	Ariel Robles	Margarita Salas Guzmán	Guillermo Arroyo Muñoz
Citizen Agenda; Coalition	Citizens' Action Party	Social democracy	Claudia Dobles Camargo	Andrea Centeno Rodríguez	Luis Felipe Arauz
Citizen Agenda; Coalition	National Democratic Agenda	Social democracy	Claudia Dobles Camargo	Andrea Centeno Rodríguez	Luis Felipe Arauz
Costa Rica First Alliance		Social democracy	Douglas Caamaño Quirós	Lissa Freckleton Owens	Carlos Moya Bonilla
Costa Rican Democratic Union Party			Boris Molina	Edgardo Morales Romero	Maricela Morales Mora
Costa Rican Social Justice Party		Social democracy	Wálter Hernández Juárez	Shirley González Mora	Eduardo Rojas Murillo
Costa Rica Rules Here		Populism	Ronny Castillo	Hazel Arias Mata	William Anderson Lewis
Democratic and Social Center Party			Ana Virginia Calzada	Oldemar Rodríguez Rojas	Heilen Díaz Gutiérrez
Forward		Classical liberalism	José Aguilar Berrocal	Evita Arguedas Maklouf	Marcela Ortiz Bonilla
Hope and Freedom Party		Humanism	Marco Rodríguez	Carlos Palacios Franco	Fabiola Romero Cruz
National Hope Party		Progressive conservatism	Claudio Alpízar Otoya	Andrés Castillo Saborío	Nora González Chacón
National Integration Party		National conservatism	Luis Amador Jiménez	Jorge Borbón	Katya Berdugo Ulate
National Liberation Party		Social democracy	Álvaro Ramos Chaves	Karen Segura Fernández	Xinia Chaves Quirós
New Generation Party		Conservatism	Fernando Zamora	Lisbeth Quesada Tristán	Yeudy Sulem Araya
New Republic Party		Christian right	Fabricio Alvarado Muñoz	David Segura Gamboa	Rosalía Brown Young
Progressive Liberal Party		Classical liberalism	Eliécer Feinzaig Mintz	Tania Molina Rojas	Gabriel Zamora Baudrit
Social Christian Unity Party		Christian democracy	Juan Carlos Hidalgo	Yolanda Fernández Ochoa	Steven Barrantes Núñez
Social Democratic Progress Party		Liberalism	Luz Mary Alpízar Loaiza	Frank Mckenzie Peterkin	Maritza Bustamante Venegas
Sovereign People's Party		Right-wing populism	Laura Fernández Delgado	Francisco Gamboa Soto	Douglas Soto Campos
United We Can		Libertarianism	Natalia Díaz Quintana	Jorge Ernesto Ocampo	Luis Diego Vargas
Working Class Party		Trotskyism	David Hernández Brenes	Obeth Morales Barquero	Jeimy Castro Valverde

== Campaign ==
The Supreme Electoral Court officially launched the election campaign on 1 October 2025. Fernández's campaign was centered on crime, amid voters' concerns about a rise in drug violence. Since 2023, Costa Rica's murder rate has climbed by over 50% compared to before Chaves took office in 2022. She said she would follow a path similar to that of Salvadoran president Nayib Bukele, including plans to complete the construction of a mega-prison modeled after the Terrorism Confinement Center (CECOT) built by Bukele. Fernández said she planned to declare a state of emergency in gang-controlled areas. Chaves's government and his policy on crime were generally popular among the Costa Rican public, and Fernández capitalized on Chaves's popularity. Fernández has said that she plans to expand the use of cargo scanners at the country's airports and seaports and strengthen partnerships with foreign and international law enforcement in order to cut down on drug trafficking.

Despite a numerically positive economic situation, the growth in the Costa Rican economy has only shown results for a small minority of citizens. Much improvement has happened only in "free trade zones", which offer tax breaks and less customs regulation for investors. Despite growth in some sectors, Costa Rica's domestic market economy has shown negligible improvement.

Fernández is opposed to abortion; she has promised to double the maximum prison sentence for women who have abortions to six years. Fernández has signaled that she will appoint outgoing president Chaves to a position in her cabinet, likely chief of staff. Voters also expressed concern at the degradation of Costa Rica's public services, such as education, healthcare, and transportation. Costa Rica is also in a dire situation demographically: a rapid increase in the average age in the country is expected in the coming decades, putting strain on the Costa Rican pension system. The environment is also a factor in the public's perception of the government, with lofty sustainability goals often left far from being met. Despite promises for a "green Costa Rica", the government plans to scale back a ban on fossil fuel exploration and to accelerate the exploitation of the country's natural resources.

International human rights observers have warned that Fernández may erode the rule of law and undermine checks and balances in Costa Rica. Many internal political groups also expressed concern at the PPSO's centralization of power. The election cycle showed a marked decrease in political participation, with barely 20% of citizens being a member of a political party. Álvaro Ramos, the National Liberation Party candidate and runner-up in the election, presented himself as a centrist alternative to the PPSO. Ramos said in a speech on 22 January that he supports the middle class. He also presents himself as opposing what he considers to be Costa Rica's growing authoritarianism, saying that he is "the strongest proposal in defense of our most important value as Costa Ricans, which is democracy". Ramos opposes the opening of Chaves's mega-prison, saying "you don't have to lock people up for being tattooed". He does still support taking a firm stance against crime, calling during the final debate for a larger police force and improved intelligence sharing with international partners. Ramos promised tax incentives for small businesses as well as infrastructure projects to reduce unemployment and create jobs.

The former first lady Claudia Dobles of the Citizen Agenda Coalition ran on a progressive platform. Dobles supported social reform and environmental protections. Regarding crime, Dobles said during the final debate before the election that she supported community-based enforcement and pushed for larger reforms in the judiciary. She said that she planned to modernize hospitals and provide free higher education.

== Opinion polls ==
According to the Public Opinion Studies Report from the Center for Political Research and Studies (CIEP) at the University of Costa Rica, 55% of voters were still undecided in December 2025, and 75% said they did not sympathize with any political party.

=== Presidential ===
==== Campaign period ====
Pollster	Date	Sample						Other	DK/DA	Neither
Pollster	Date	Sample	Alvarado PNR	Dobles CAC	Fernández PPSO	Ramos PLN	Robles FA	Other	DK/DA	Neither
Pollster	Date	Sample					Frente Amplio	Other	DK/DA	Neither
IDESPO	22 January 2026	805	1.7%	5.2%	39.9%	6.0%	3.5%	4.2%	38.8%	0.7%
OPOL	21 January 2026	3075	3.5%	3.6%	43.2%	6.6%	2.6%	10.4%	29.8%	0.3%
CIEP	21 January 2026	1006	4.0%	5.0%	40.0%	8.0%	4.0%	6.7%	32.0%	0.3%
OPOL	14 January 2026	3070	4.2%	3.1%	42.5%	6.2%	3.0%	9.2%	29.0%	2.8%
OPOL	7 January 2026	3008	3.3%	2.7%	40.3%	6.0%	3.1%	9.6%	34.5%	0.5%
CID Gallup	6 January 2026	1200	5.9%	3.6%	40.7%	9.0%	4.3%	11.1%	11.0%	14.4%
OPOL	23 December 2025	3241	3.0%	2.6%	39.4%	5.6%	3.1%	9.6%	33.8%	2.9%
Demoscopía	15 December 2025	1200	3.5%	3.1%	27.4%	11.3%	4.8%	8.2%	41.7%	-
OPOL	10 December 2025	2965	3.8%	2.4%	38.0%	6.1%	3.6%	11.2%	32.7%	2.2%
Idespo	8 December 2025	805	1.5%	5.2%	32.8%	6.6%	3.7%	2.9%	45.5%	1.8%
CIEP	3 December 2025	1759	1.0%	4.0%	30.0%	8.0%	5.0%	4.4%	45.0%	2.6%
OPOL	26 November 2025	3040	3.7%	2.8%	37.7%	6.9%	3.4%	10.5%	34.1%	0.9%
Demoscopía	17 November 2025	1200	5.0%	3.0%	21.4%	9.0%	4.0%	10.5%	19.4%	27.7%
OPOL	12 November 2025	3072	4.0%	1.3%	37.8%	7.2%	2.4%	8.4%	37.9%	1.0%
IDESPO	6 November 2025	832	0.6%	2.3%	28.1%	6.2%	2.9%	3.9%	54.0%	2.0%
OPOL	29 October 2025	2951	4.8%	2.9%	31.2%	7.4%	3.7%	9.2%	39.0%	1.8%
CIEP	22 October 2025	1333	0.6%	3.0%	25.0%	7.0%	3.0%	3.9%	55.0%	2.5%

==== Pre-campaign period ====
Pollster	Date	Sample						Other	DK/DA	Neither
Pollster	Date	Sample	Alvarado PNR	Dobles CAC	Fernández PPSO	Ramos PLN	Robles FA	Other	DK/DA	Neither
Pollster	Date	Sample					Frente Amplio	Other	DK/DA	Neither
OPOL	30 September 2025	3000	8.7%	5.5%	45.1%	9.4%	6.4%	24.9%	-	
Enfoques Investigaciones MP	18 September 2025	800	13.0%	5.0%	26.0%	9.0%	3.0%	12.0%	32.0%	-
CID Gallup	11 September 2025	1205	15.0%	5.0%	20.0%	8.0%	4.0%	12.0%	12.0%	24.0%
CIEP	10 September 2025	1003	1.0%	2.0%	12.0%	6.0%	5.0%	12.0%	57.0%	5.0%
OPOL	3 September 2025	3000	6.8%	3.9%	27.6%	8.4%	4.2%	14.8%	5.6%	28.7%
Sondeo CIOdD-UCR	2 September 2025	4111	0.8%	17.2%	13.1%	24.7%	20.8%	15.3%	8.1%	-
OPOL	5 August 2025	3020	7.2%	3.4%	24.0%	7.1%	3.2%	11.9%	14.7%	28.5%
OPOL	8 July 2025	1800	10.3%	3.8%	13.1%	7.6%	2.9%	17.6%	9.3%	35.4%

=== Legislative ===
Pollster	Date	Sample	PA	PPSD	PNR	PIN	CR1	PACRM	PUP	CAC	PLP	PPSO	PUSC	PLN	FA	PEL	PNG	Other	DK/DA	Neither
Pollster	Date	Sample													Frente Amplio			Other	DK/DA	Neither
CIEP	21 January 2026	1006	1.0% _{1}	0.6% _{1}	1.0% _{1}	0.1% _{0}	0.0% _{0}	0.0% _{0}	0.1% _{0}	1.5% _{2}	0.6% _{1}	29.0% _{31}	2.0% _{2}	9.0% _{10}	7.0% _{8}	0.0% _{0}	0.1% _{0}	0.4% _{0}	46.0%	1.1%
IDESPO	8 December 2025	805	0.2% _{0}	2.3% _{2}	1.6% _{2}	0.1% _{0}	0.2% _{0}	0.0% _{0}	0.1% _{0}	1.8% _{2}	0.9% _{1}	29.5% _{30}	2.8% _{3}	10.8% _{11}	6.1% _{6}	0.0% _{0}	0.0% _{0}	0.7% _{0}	41.1%	1.8%
CIEP	22 October 2025	1333	0.1% _{0}	2.0% _{3}	0.2% _{0}	0.3% _{1}	0.0% _{0}	0.0% _{0}	0.3% _{1}	1.2% _{2}	0.5% _{1}	14.0% _{22}	2.0% _{3}	8.0% _{12}	6.0% _{9}	0.2% _{0}	0.1% _{0}	2.1% _{3}	60.0%	3.0%
CIEP	10 September 2025	1003	0.1% _{0}	5.0% _{10}	0.5% _{1}	0.0% _{0}	0.0% _{0}	0.2% _{0}	0.2% _{0}	1.0% _{2}	1.0% _{2}	7.0% _{13}	2.0% _{4}	5.0% _{10}	7.0% _{13}	0.0% _{0}	0.5% _{1}	0.5% _{1}	70.0%	–

== Conduct ==
The election took place at 7,000 voting centers across Costa Rica. Voting began at 6 a.m. and ended at 6 p.m. No major irregularities were reported surrounding the election, although a brief clash occurred between supporters of Fernández and Ramos when the candidates arrived to vote. 3.7 million Costa Ricans were eligible to vote in the election.

== Results ==
=== President ===
With 85% of the polling stations reporting, Laura Fernández Delgado of the Sovereign People's Party (PPSO) held an unassailable lead of 48.7% of the votes cast, ahead of her closest rival, Álvaro Ramos Chaves of the National Liberation Party (PLN), with 33.2%. Ramos conceded around five hours into the count. Had no candidate received a 40% plurality of the valid votes in the first round, a runoff election would have been held on 5 April. There were 20 candidates for president; other than Fernández and Ramos, none managed to break 5% of the presidential vote. Turnout was 69.22%, up 9.25 percentage points from the 2022 first round.

Candidate	Running mate	Party	Votes	%
Laura Fernández Delgado	Francisco Gamboa Soto; Douglas Soto Campos	Sovereign People's Party	1,243,141	48.53
Álvaro Ramos Chaves	Karen Segura Fernández; Xinia Chaves Quirós	National Liberation Party	861,879	33.65
Claudia Dobles Camargo	Andrea Centeno Rodríguez; Luis Felipe Arauz	Citizens' Agenda Coalition	125,714	4.91
Ariel Robles	Margarita Salas Guzmán; Guillermo Arroyo Muñoz	Broad Front	96,384	3.76
Juan Carlos Hidalgo	Yolanda Fernández Ochoa; Steven Barrantes	Social Christian Unity Party	68,188	2.66
Fabricio Alvarado Muñoz	David Segura Gamboa; Rosalía Brown Young	New Republic Party	56,159	2.19
José Aguilar Berrocal	Evita Arguedas Maklouf; Marcela Ortiz Bonilla	Forward	45,893	1.79
Natalia Díaz Quintana	Jorge Ernesto Ocampo; Luis Diego Vargas	United We Can	21,492	0.84
Eliécer Feinzaig Mintz	Tania Molina Rojas; Gabriel Zamora Baudrit	Progressive Liberal Party	8,648	0.34
Luz Mary Alpízar Loaiza	Frank Mckenzie Peterkin; Maritza Bustamante Venegas	Social Democratic Progress Party	6,552	0.26
Fernando Zamora	Lisbeth Quesada Tristán; Yeudy Sulem Araya	New Generation Party	5,516	0.22
Ana Virginia Calzada	Oldemar Rodríguez Rojas; Heilen Díaz Gutiérrez	Democratic and Social Center Party	5,408	0.21
Luis Amador Jiménez	Jorge Borbón; Katya Berdugo Ulate	National Integration Party	3,873	0.15
David Hernández Brenes	Obeth Morales Barquero; Jeimy Castro Valverde	Working Class Party	2,456	0.10
Wálter Hernández Juárez	Shirley González Mora; Eduardo Rojas Murillo	Costa Rican Social Justice Party	2,183	0.09
Boris Molina	Edgardo Morales Romero; Maricela Morales Mora	Costa Rican Democratic Union Party	1,917	0.07
Claudio Alpízar Otoya	Andrés Castillo Saborío; Nora González Chacón	National Hope Party	1,826	0.07
Marco Rodríguez	Carlos Palacios Franco; Fabiola Romero Cruz	Hope and Freedom Party	1,415	0.06
Douglas Caamaño Quirós	Lissa Freckleton Owens; Carlos Moya Bonilla	Costa Rica First Alliance	1,365	0.05
Ronny Castillo	Hazel Arias Mata; William Anderson Lewis	Costa Rica Rules Here	1,334	0.05
Total			2,561,343	100.00
Valid votes			2,561,343	99.15
Invalid votes			12,824	0.50
Blank votes			9,018	0.35
Total votes			2,583,185	100.00
Registered voters/turnout			3,731,788	69.22
Source: TSE

=== Legislative Assembly ===
Party	Votes	%	Seats	+/–
Sovereign People's Party	1,150,147	45.20	31	New
National Liberation Party	591,604	23.25	17	–2
Broad Front	313,868	12.33	7	+1
Social Christian Unity Party	115,135	4.52	1	–8
Citizen Agenda Coalition (PAC and ADN)	103,560	4.07	1	+1
New Republic Party	62,703	2.46	0	–6
Forward	43,886	1.72	0	0
United We Can	30,421	1.20	0	0
New Generation Party	17,758	0.70	0	0
Progressive Liberal Party	17,526	0.69	0	–6
Social Democratic Progress Party	14,832	0.58	0	–10
Let's Act Now	12,612	0.50	0	0
Democratic and Social Center	8,089	0.32	0	New
Costa Rican Social Justice Party	7,915	0.31	0	0
Compatriots	7,842	0.31	0	New
Costa Rica First Alliance	7,578	0.30	0	0
National Integration Party	7,295	0.29	0	0
National Hope Party	6,318	0.25	0	New
Working Class Party	5,829	0.23	0	0
Guanacastecan Union Party	5,637	0.22	0	0
Costa Rican Democratic Union	4,674	0.18	0	0
Hope and Freedom Party	4,349	0.17	0	New
Costa Rica Rules Here	4,008	0.16	0	New
Costa Rican Anti-Corruption Party	1,040	0.04	0	0
Total	2,544,626	100.00	57	0
Valid votes	2,544,626	98.99		
Invalid votes	17,028	0.66		
Blank votes	9,017	0.35		
Total votes	2,570,671	100.00		
Registered voters/turnout	3,664,518	70.15		
Source: TSE, TSE

==== By constituency ====
Assembly seats by province

In the Legislative Assembly election, the PPSO led in all seven of the country's provinces. The PLN placed second across the board, posting its best results in Cartago (28%), Heredia (26%) and San José (25%). The PPSO won 31 seats, surpassing the absolute majority of 29. Of the remaining 26 seats, the PLN won 17 and the FA won 7. The CAC and the PUSC won one each, both in San José.

Constituency	PPSO		PLN		FA		PUSC		CAC	
Constituency	%	Seats	%	Seats	%	Seats	%	Seats	%	Seats
San José	39.37	8	25.28	5	15.89	3	4.69	1	5.08	1
Alajuela	52.20	7	22.64	3	10.75	2	3.41	0	2.64	0
Cartago	34.85	3	28.14	2	13.62	1	3.95	0	5.69	0
Heredia	40.40	2	26.42	2	16.26	1	3.61	0	4.86	0
Guanacaste	50.48	3	18.46	2	5.74	0	5.53	0	3.41	0
Puntarenas	59.35	4	15.94	2	6.25	0	5.37	0	1.97	0
Limón	56.92	4	15.01	1	5.14	0	7.36	0	2.35	0
Total	45.20	31	23.25	17	12.33	7	4.52	1	4.07	1
Source: TSE, La Nación

== Aftermath ==
After the polls closed and before the results were announced, the Supreme Electoral Court president Eugenia Zamora highlighted citizen participation in a civic day and said that "those who tried to discredit this Court and damage the trust that our people have always had in its electoral processes" had failed. She called for reconciliation, responsibility and an end to violent, and stigmatising rhetoric. In her first statements as the winner, Fernández stated that "democracy has spoken and voted for continuity of change", and that she will continue her predecessor's policies. Meanwhile, opposition groups warned of the possibility of an authoritarian figure coming to power following the victory of the ruling party.

Claudia Dobles proposed the formation of a large commission in the Legislative Assembly, and Ariel Robles accepted his defeat, stating that the party would intensify its political activity in the streets. Latin American presidents, including those of El Salvador (Nayib Bukele), Paraguay (Santiago Peña), Panama (José Raúl Mulino), Guatemala (Bernardo Arévalo), Honduras (Nasry Asfura), and the president-elect of Chile (José Antonio Kast), as well as the Secretary General of the Organization of American States Albert Ramdin, congratulated Fernández on her victory. Prime Minister of Spain Pedro Sánchez also congratuled her. The European Union issued a statement congratulating Fernández and calling for continued collaboration. Chinese President Xi Jinping also congratuled Fernández, Marco Rubio, the United States secretary of state, congratulated Fernández and praised her tough stance on drug trafficking. Fernández was sworn in on 8 May 2026 as the second female president of Costa Rica after Laura Chinchilla.
