= Álvaro Ramos Chaves =

Costa Rican economist and politician (born 1983)

Álvaro Ramos
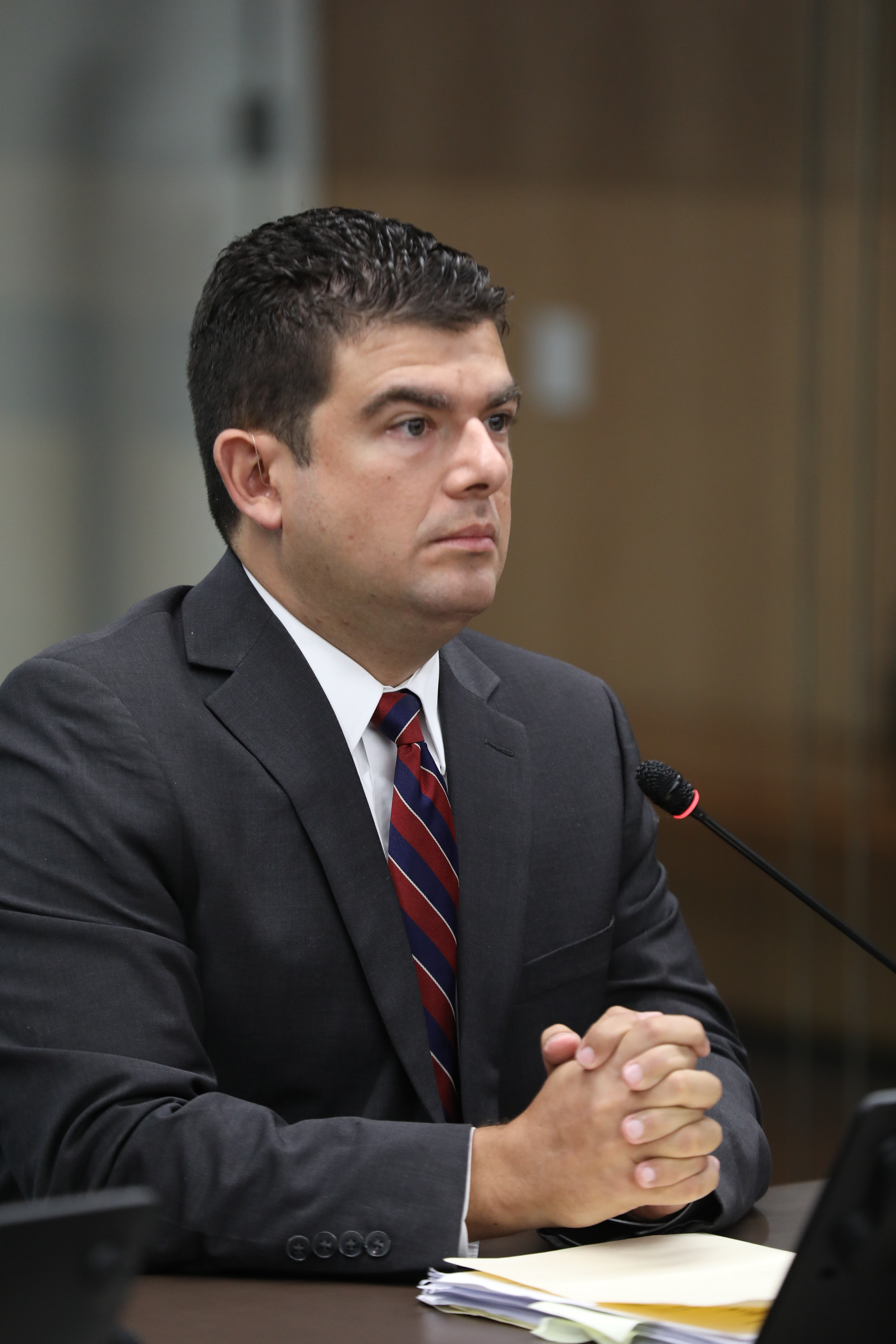
- Ramos in 2023

President of the Costa Rican Social Security Fund
- In office 8 May 2022 – 17 September 2022
- President: Rodrigo Chaves
- Preceded by: Román Macaya
- Succeeded by: Marta Esquivel Rodríguez

Superintendent of Pensions
- In office 19 June 2015 – 8 April 2020
- President: Luis Guillermo Solís; Carlos Alvarado Quesada
- Preceded by: Edgar Robles Cordero
- Succeeded by: Rocío Aguilar Montoya

Vice Minister of Revenue
- In office 4 July 2012 – 8 May 2014
- President: Laura Chinchilla
- Preceded by: Rowland Espinosa Howell
- Succeeded by: Fernando Rodríguez Garro

Personal details
- Born: Álvaro Roberto Ramos Chaves; 6 December 1983 (age 42) San José, Costa Rica
- Party: PLN
- Spouse: Cristie Castro Fonseca (m. 2013)
- Children: 2
- Education: Distance State University (BSc); University of Costa Rica (BA); University of California, Berkeley (PhD)
- Occupation: Economist; politician; computer scientist; professor; consultant

Academic background
- Thesis: Essays on Economic Development in Costa Rica (2010)

Academic work
- Discipline: Macroeconomics
- Sub-discipline: Economic development Labour economics
- Institutions: University of Costa Rica

Álvaro Roberto Ramos Chaves (Note: In this name that follows Hispanic American naming customs, the first or paternal surname is Ramos and the second or maternal family name is Chaves.) (born 6 December 1983) is a Costa Rican computer scientist, economist, academic and politician who served as President of the Costa Rican Social Security Fund in 2022. A member of the National Liberation Party, he was the party's presidential candidate in the 2026 general election.

Ramos began his public career in the Ministry of Finance, serving as Director General from 2011 to 2012 and as Vice Minister of Revenue from 2012 to 2014. He subsequently worked at the Central Bank of Costa Rica and headed the Superintendence of Pensions before working in academia and at the International Labour Organization. He has also worked as an independent consultant on economic policy, social protection, and institutional reform.

== Early life and education ==
Álvaro Roberto Ramos Chaves was born in the metropolitan district of Catedral, San José, on 6 December 1983, to politician Álvaro Ramos Rechnitz and Berta Chaves Abarca, a lawyer and career official at the Office of the Comptroller General of the Republic.

Ramos was born with severe hearing loss in his right ear and profound hearing loss in his left ear, possibly of congenital origin, and is therefore considered a person with a hearing disability. He uses hearing aids and communicates through pattern recognition and analytical intelligence. He received speech therapy at the Fernando Centeno Güell National Center for Special Education for five years, beginning in early childhood.

He attended preschool and first grade at the University of Costa Rica's Laboratory School and subsequently completed his primary and secondary education at Los Angeles School. At the age of 15, he reportedly began to consider studying economics and read The Economist. While still in high school, Ramos completed university-level coursework in administration, finance, statistics, and business strategy at the Distance State University, where he earned a bachelor of science degree in Administrative Informatics in 2005.

In 2001, Ramos received the Distinguished Costa Rican Student award from the Ministry of Public Education after obtaining the highest grade point average on the national high school exit examinations. He was also one of five students, among more than 23,800 applicants nationwide, to obtain a perfect score of 800 on the University of Costa Rica's admission examination that year. He subsequently studied Economics at the university, graduating with a bachelor's degree in Economics with honors. He worked as a teaching assistant from March 2004 to December 2005 and as a research assistant from June to December 2005.

Ramos later obtained a PhD in Economics from the University of California, Berkeley, in 2010. He entered the doctoral program after achieving a perfect score on the Graduate Record Examinations and worked as a graduate student instructor between August 2007 and June 2009. He returned to Costa Rica in December 2010.

In March 2011, Ramos joined the University of Costa Rica's School of Economics as a non-tenured professor, and was appointed to a tenured faculty position four years later. His teaching included undergraduate and graduate courses in microeconomics, econometrics, game theory, industrial organization, labour economics, economic development, international trade, macroeconomics, and introductory economics.

== Early public career (2011–2022) ==
Ramos was appointed Director General of the Ministry of Finance in April 2011, during the administration of President Laura Chinchilla. In June 2012, he became Vice Minister of Revenue, succeeding Rowland Espinosa. He left the position following the end of Chinchilla's administration in May 2014 and subsequently worked at the Central Bank of Costa Rica as a senior economic researcher.

In June 2015, the National Council for the Supervision of the Financial System appointed Ramos Superintendent of Pensions, placing him in charge of the country's pension-system regulator. Although his term was scheduled to continue until June 2020, he resigned in April of that year to become Director of Academic Affairs at LEAD University. He held that position until November 2020, when he joined the International Labour Organization in Geneva as a technical expert in social protection financing. He remained there until 2022.

== Political career (2022–present) ==
=== Presidency of the Costa Rican Social Security Fund ===
Ramos returned to Costa Rica in May 2022 after President Rodrigo Chaves appointed him president of the Board of Directors of the Costa Rican Social Security Fund (CCSS).

His tenure was marked by a dispute with the Chaves administration over the reinstatement of a public-sector salary increase that had been suspended in 2020 during the COVID-19 pandemic. Following the government's declaration in August 2022 that the national COVID-19 emergency had ended, the CCSS board voted in September to recognize the previously suspended salary increase. The decision drew opposition from Finance Minister Nogui Acosta Jaen and President Chaves, who argued that its implementation conflicted with the fiscal rule established under the Law on Strengthening Public Finances of 2018.

Ramos and the CCSS board declined to reverse the decision. On 17 September, the Governing Council decided to remove Ramos as president of the CCSS board and replace him with Labor and Social Security Minister Marta Esquivel Rodríguez. His removal drew criticism from opposition politicians and representatives of the labor sector.

After leaving office, Ramos defended the CCSS's financial position and disputed statements by President Chaves concerning the institution's finances. He also criticized the government's approach to the CCSS and alleged that his dismissal was connected in part to disagreements over the government's criticism of the newspaper La Nación. Ramos and Esquivel were subsequently summoned to the Legislative Assembly's Committee on Public Revenue and Expenditure Control, where they presented differing views concerning the CCSS's financial condition and its management of infrastructure projects.

From October 2022, Ramos has worked as an independent economics and public policy consultant. In January 2024, he became rector of the Braulio Carrillo University, a private university in San José. He resumed his academic activities following the 2026 election.

=== 2025–26 presidential campaign ===
In 2025, Ramos sought the presidential nomination of the National Liberation Party (PLN) for the 2026 general election. He won the party's presidential convention on 6 April 2025, receiving 117,698 votes and defeating legislators Gilberth Jiménez and Carolina Delgado and businessman Marvin Taylor. The PLN formally accredited him as its presidential candidate later that month.

Ramos's campaign emphasized strengthening the Costa Rican Social Security Fund, economic policy, transparency, and public-sector ethics. His platform also included measures addressing public security, organized crime and drug trafficking, education, and the concerns of the middle class.

During the campaign, Ramos presented himself as an alternative to the political approach of President Rodrigo Chaves, with whom he had publicly disagreed following his removal from the CCSS in 2022. Ramos advocated political dialogue, transparency, and the pursuit of agreements, and criticized what he described as excessive concentration of power in the executive branch.

In the presidential election, he finished second with 33.6% of the vote, behind Laura Fernández of the Sovereign People's Party, who won the election in the first round with more than 48.5%. Ramos conceded the election and stated that he would pursue a constructive opposition to the incoming government. He also called for continued renewal of the PLN, on which he had emphasized since winning the party's presidential nomination the previous year.

In August 2026, Minister of the Presidency and Finance Rodrigo Chaves criticized Ramos over his position on the proposed withdrawal of funds from the Mandatory Complementary Pension Regime (ROP), calling him "limited" and "hypocritical" and questioning a previously stated change in his position since his tenure as Superintendent of Pensions. Ramos responded that he had opposed an immediate, unrestricted withdrawal without safeguards, rather than a phased withdrawal supported by technical measures, and stated that political debate should focus on "ideas, numbers and decisions" rather than individuals. Chaves’s remarks prompted a public letter demanding an apology, signed by more than 800 people, whose signatories described the use of "limited" as an insult as discriminatory toward people with disabilities.

In October of that year, Ramos endorsed a slate of seven candidates for leadership positions in the National Liberation Party, recommending that party delegates elect them as a unified team. The slate included Óscar Izquierdo for party president, Daniela Coll for vice president, Alexandra Blanco for secretary-general, Alvis González for deputy secretary-general, Annie Saborío for treasurer, Rafael Vargas for deputy treasurer, and Óscar González for party auditor. In a letter to party delegates, Ramos said a unified leadership would help the party prepare for the 2028 municipal elections and the 2030 general election. At the party's National Assembly on 10 October, candidates backed by Ramos won five of the seven positions, with only Miguel Guillén re-elected secretary-general and legislator Éder Hernández elected deputy secretary-general instead of Ramos's preferred candidates for those posts.

== Selected works ==
- Chavarría, R.; Víquez, J.; and Ramos, A. (2017). Pensiones en Costa Rica: equilibrio y solidaridad [Pensions in Costa Rica: balance and solidarity]. Paper prepared for the Informe Estado de la Nación 2017.
- Kasy, Maximilian; Ramos-Chaves, Álvaro (2014). "The Impact of Changing Family Structures on the Income Distribution among Costa Rican Women 1993–2009". Feminist Economics. 20 (2): 122–144. https://doi.org/10.1080/13545701.2013.862343.
- Ramos-Chaves, Álvaro (2010). "Essays on Economic Development in Costa Rica". PhD dissertation, University of California, Berkeley.
- Ramos-Chaves, Álvaro (2010). "Paternidad responsable: Efectos económicos de la legislación de reconocimiento obligatorio de los hijos" [Responsible fatherhood: Economic effects of legislation requiring recognition of children]. University of California, Berkeley.
- Ramos Chaves, Álvaro (2015). "Análisis de las finanzas públicas en Costa Rica: ¿Quién dijo que era fácil?" [Analysis of public finances in Costa Rica: Who said it was easy?]. San José: Programa Estado de la Nación.
- Razavi, Shahra; Behrendt, Christina; Nesterenko, Valeria; Orton, Ian; Peyron Bista, Celine; Ramos-Chaves, Álvaro; Schwarzer, Helmut; Stern-Plaza, Maya; and Wodsak, Veronika (2022). "Building universal social protection systems for all: What role for targeting?". Global Social Policy. 22 (3): 449–463.
