= Douglas Soto =

Second Vice President of Costa Rica since 2026

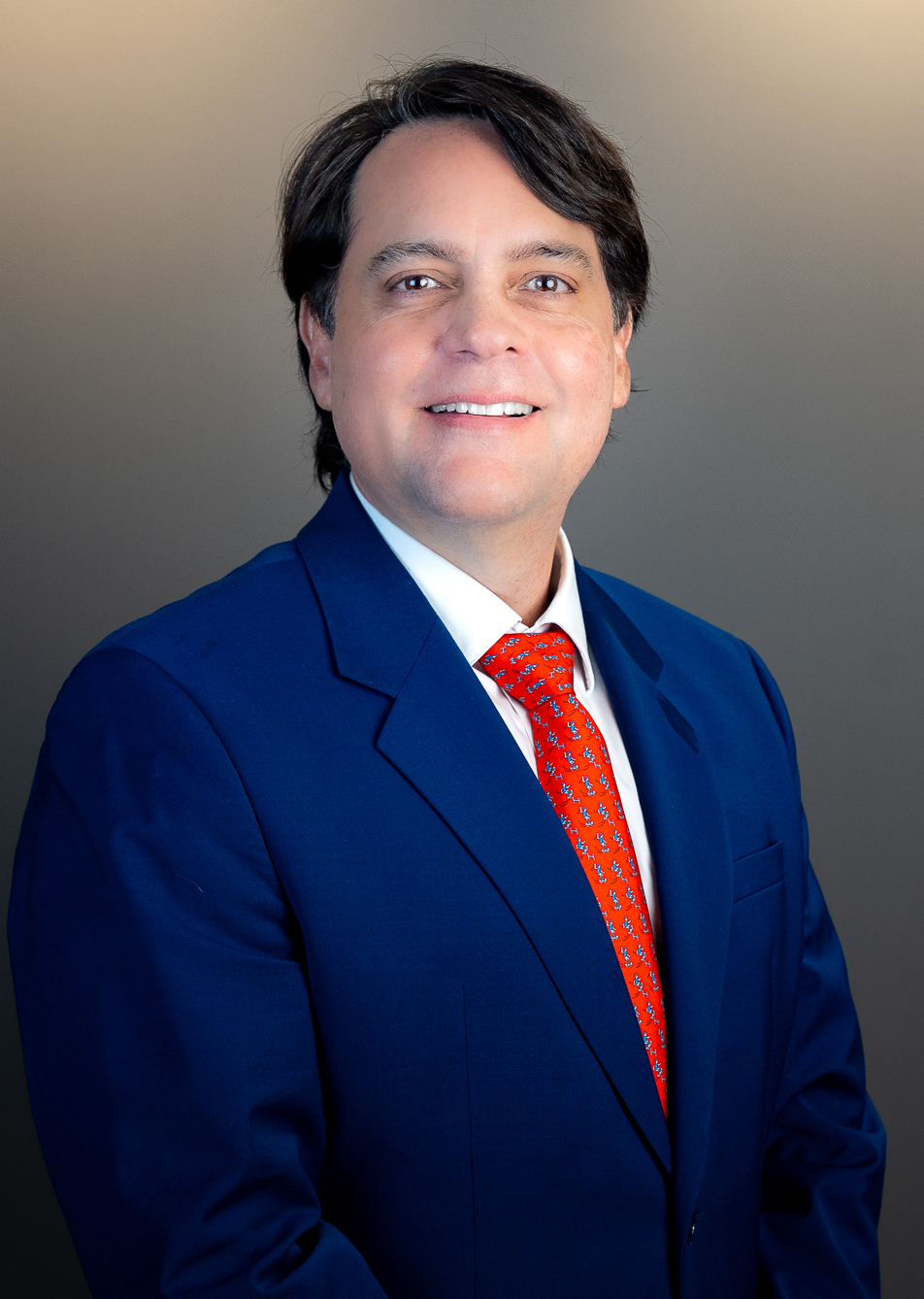
- Official portrait, 2026

Second Vice President of Costa Rica
- Incumbent
- Assumed office 8 May 2026 Serving with Francisco Gamboa
- President: Laura Fernández
- Preceded by: Mary Munive

Ambassador of Costa Rica to the United States
- Incumbent
- Assumed office 8 May 2026
- President: Laura Fernández
- Preceded by: Catalina Crespo Sancho

Personal details
- Born: 22 September 1975 (age 50) San José, Costa Rica
- Party: PPSO (since 2025)
- Other political affiliations: PUSC (until 2025)

Douglas Soto Campos (born 22 September 1975) is a Costa Rican lawyer, businessman and politician serving as the Second Vice President of Costa Rica and the Ambassador of Costa Rica to the United States since 2026.

== Career ==
Soto is a lawyer by profession, an expert in business, banking and financial law.

He joined the PPSO after leaving the PUSC, the party within which he would contest the primary to become a candidate in the 2026 elections but renounced.

On 28 July 2025, he was presented as part of the PPSO ticket led by Laura Fernández Delgado, alongside Francisco Gamboa as first vice president candidate for the 2026 general election. In his speech, Soto stated that "our mission is a sacred duty: to carry on this work through Costa Rica’s next president, Ms. Laura Fernández. This is a project that will bring well-being to millions of Costa Ricans, a project that is not beholden to elites or political parties". He describes himself as a "non traditional politician".

He was elected second vice president of Costa Rica on 1 February 2026 in the first round.

Political offices
Preceded by Mary Munive	Second Vice President of Costa Rica; 2026–present	Incumbent
