= Francisco Gamboa (politician) =

First Vice President of Costa Rica since 2026

- Official portrait, 2026

First Vice President of Costa Rica
- Incumbent
- Assumed office 8 May 2026 Serving with Douglas Soto
- President: Laura Fernández
- Preceded by: Mary Munive
Previous offices
Secretary General of the Sovereign People's Party
In office 1 June 2025 – 16 March 2026
| Preceded by | Party established |
| Succeeded by | Freddy González Rojas |
Minister of the Economy, Industry and Trade
In office 8 May 2022 – 30 January 2025
| President | Rodrigo Chaves |
| Preceded by | Victoria Hernández Mora |
| Succeeded by | Patricia Rojas Morales |

Personal details
- Born: Francisco Ernesto Gamboa Soto; 20 March 1980 (age 46) San José, Costa Rica
- Party: PPSO
- Education: University of Costa Rica (BA, MA)
- Occupation: Economist; politician; professor

Francisco Ernesto Gamboa Soto (born 20 March 1980) is a Costa Rican economist and politician who has served as First Vice President of Costa Rica since 2026. A member of the Sovereign People's Party, he won the 2026 Costa Rican election as the running mate of Laura Fernández Delgado. He previously served as Minister of the Economy, Industry and Trade from 2022 to 2026.

== Biography ==
Gamboa was born in San José on 20 March 1980. He began to study economics at the University of Costa Rica during the late 1990s, where he obtained bachelor's and master's degrees in economics. According to contemporaries, Gamboa was involved with the National Liberation Party during his youth, although he did not hold a formal party position at the time. He has taught at the University of Costa Rica, the Autonomous University of Central America, and Fidélitas University.

Gamboa began his professional career in the private and public sectors. In 2002, he became an adviser in the economic division of the Central Bank of Costa Rica. During the same year, he briefly worked as a research assistant for Costa Rica's Advisory Commission on High Technology (CAATEC) between April and June. After working for the Central Bank, Gamboa served as economic advisor to the Costa Rican Chamber of Commerce from 2002 to 2006.

Gamboa served as director of business intelligence for the Costa Rican Foreign Trade Promotion Agency from 2006 to 2014, then was executive director of the Costa Rican Chamber of Industries from 2015 to 2019. In January 2020, he was appointed Director of Institutional Relations, Advertising, and Sustainability at the Banco Nacional de Costa Rica. In May 2022, after Rodrigo Chaves Robles assumed office as president, Gamboa was appointed Minister of the Economy, Industry and Trade. He served three years in that role until resigning at the end of January 2025.

On 1 June 2025, Gamboa was elected secretary general of the Sovereign People's Party (PPSO) at a national party assembly. At the time, he still held a position as director of institutional relations at the Banco Nacional, although he had been on unpaid leave from the bank since May 2022 to serve as a cabinet minister. The bank subsequently examined whether Gamboa's participation in partisan political activities was compatible with restrictions contained in the Organic Law of the National Banking System, and referred the case to the Supreme Electoral Court. He resigned from his position at the bank three days later.

The next month, Gamboa was selected as Laura Fernández Delgado's first running mate in the 2026 general election, as the PPSO nominee. They won the election with 48.5% of the vote.

== Works ==
- Análisis del dinamismo de la exportación de bienes de Costa Rica: Evolución durante la última década. San José: Programa Estado de la Nación, 2015.
- Evolución de los flujos de comercio internacional de Costa Rica tras los tratados de libre comercio: documento de trabajo. San José: Programa Estado de la Nación, 2017.

Political offices
| Preceded by Victoria Hernández Mora | Minister of the Economy, Industry and Trade; 2022–2025 | Succeeded by Patricia Rojas Morales |
| Preceded by Mary Munive | First Vice President of Costa Rica; 2026–present | Incumbent |
