= Sovereign People's Party (Costa Rica) =

Sovereign People's Party Partido Pueblo Soberano
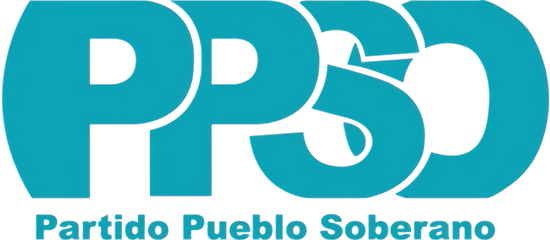
- Abbreviation: PPSO
- Leader: Laura Fernández
- President: Mayuli Ortega Guzmán
- General Secretary: Francisco Gamboa Soto
- Spokesperson: Nogui Acosta Jaén
- Founded: 3 September 2022; 4 years ago
- Split from: Social Democratic Progress Party
- Headquarters: Avenida 17, Barrio Escalante, San José, Costa Rica
- Ideology: Right-wing populism; Conservatism
- Political position: Right-wing
- Colours: Turquoise; White
- Slogan: Lo mejor está por venir ('The best is yet to come')
- Legislative Assembly: 31 / 57

Website
- pueblosoberano.org

The Sovereign People's Party (Spanish: Partido Pueblo Soberano, PPSO) is a Costa Rican conservative political party founded on September 3, 2022. Since its creation, it has positioned itself as an ally and later as the electoral vehicle of the "Rodriguista" or "Chavista" movement, led de facto by President Rodrigo Chaves Robles. It established itself as the ruling party coalition for the 2026 general elections, effectively acting as the successor to the Social Democratic Progress Party.

== History ==
The PPSO was officially registered with the Supreme Electoral Court (TSE) on September 3, 2022, by former deputy and presidential official Mayuli Ortega Guzmán, along with collaborators from Rodrigo Chaves' government.

In July 2025, an informal coalition consisting of five groups was announced: Pueblo Soberano, Movimiento Tiempo de Valientes (Motiva), Partido Esperanza y Libertad (PEL), Movimiento Creemos, and Partido Renacer Democrático (PRD). The alliance sought to present a single presidential ticket and legislative list for 2026.

Days later, Esperanza y Libertad and Renacer Democrático withdrew, denouncing marginalization and the imposition of decisions. Only Pueblo Soberano and Motiva remained registered with the TSE, as Creemos did not complete its registration and Renacer Democrático had pending appeals.

The party ran former Minister of the Presidency Laura Fernández Delgado for president, who won the 2026 Costa Rican general election in the first round. The party also secured an absolute majority of 31 seats in the Legislative Assembly.

== Ideology ==
The party defines itself as economically liberal and socially conservative, promoting fiscal austerity, private investment, less bureaucracy, and the defense of traditional values. Analysts classify it within the Costa Rican new right, centered on a "people versus the elites" narrative and strongly identifying with the figure of President Chaves.

== Leadership ==
The party's current president is Mayuli Ortega Guzmán.

Leadership is shared with Francisco Gamboa Soto, former Minister of Economy, who serves as secretary general. In July 2025, the presidential ticket for 2026 was confirmed by a direct decision of the party's National Assembly, after eliminating the internal convention.

== Controversies ==
=== Failure of the Chavista coalition ===
The original informal coalition of five groups has been reduced to only Pueblo Soberano and Motiva after the departure of Esperanza y Libertad and Renacer Democrático.These parties denounced internal marginalization and centralized decision making by the PPSO.

=== Internal coercion ===
Members of Esperanza y Libertad reported constant calls from the PPSO leadership urging members to resign from their positions, a situation described as "political coercion" within the bloc.

=== Francisco Gamboa's political involvement ===
Francisco Gamboa Soto was reported to the Supreme Electoral Court for actively participating in politics while holding a position at the National Bank. An electoral appeal was filed and he subsequently resigned from the National Bank to prioritize his party role.

=== Payment for online trolls and conflicts of interest ===
Controversy was generated over the creation of the party while Mayuli Ortega held a position in the executive branch. Additionally, she is linked to the contracting of online trolls and to abstaining from 51 legislative votes related to political financing.

=== Controversial propaganda ===
Billboards featuring images of party leaders (Ortega, Cisneros, Gamboa) and the slogan "What you see, you don't question" were criticized. Pilar Cisneros denied officially representing the Rodriguismo movement and dismissed the use of her image as electoral opportunism.

=== Ties to organized crime ===
Since its beginning, the party has been accused on multiple occasions of having ties to drug trafficking, supposedly even going so far as to issue orders from the Presidential House such as eliminating the coast guard in the southern region, a well-known hub for drug trafficking. In the 2026 national elections, the TSE called for the Sovereign People's Party to account for undeclared funding.

== Election results ==
=== Presidential ===
Election	Candidate	First round				Second round				Ref
Election	Candidate	Votes	%	Position	Result	Votes	%	Position	Result	Ref
2026	Laura Fernández Delgado	1,243,141	48.53	1st	Won	—				

=== Parliamentary ===
Election	Leader	Votes	%	Seats	+/–	Position	Government	Ref
2026	Laura Fernández Delgado	1,150,147	45.20	31 / 57	New	1st	Government	
