= Laura Fernández =

President of Costa Rica since 2026

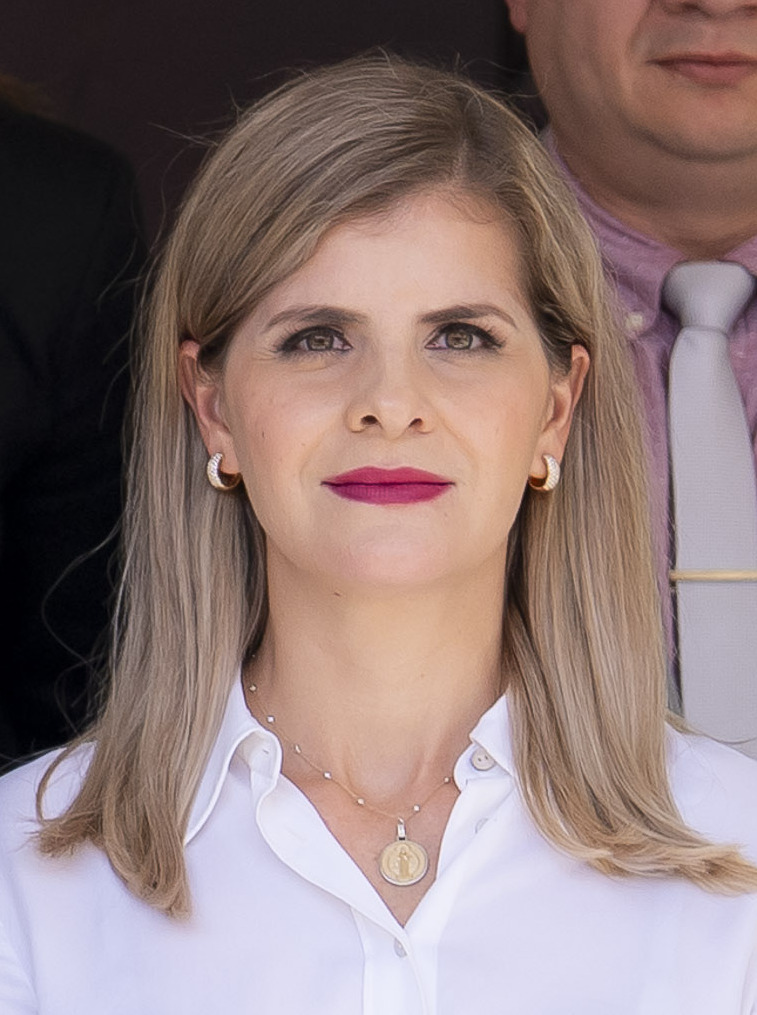
- Fernández in 2026

50th President of Costa Rica
- Incumbent
- Assumed office 8 May 2026
- Vice President: First Vice President Francisco Gamboa; Second Vice President Douglas Soto
- Preceded by: Rodrigo Chaves

Minister of the Presidency of Costa Rica
- In office 4 February 2026 – 8 May 2026
- President: Rodrigo Chaves
- Preceded by: Herself
- Succeeded by: Rodrigo Chaves
- In office 22 June 2024 – 31 January 2025
- President: Rodrigo Chaves
- Preceded by: Natalia Díaz Quintana
- Succeeded by: Herself

Minister of National Planning and Economic Policy of Costa Rica
- In office 8 May 2022 – 8 January 2025
- President: Rodrigo Chaves
- Preceded by: Pilar Garrido Gonzalo
- Succeeded by: Marta Esquivel Rodríguez

Personal details
- Born: Laura Virginia Fernández Delgado; 4 July 1986 (age 40) Puntarenas, Costa Rica
- Party: Sovereign People's Party (since 2025)
- Other political affiliations: Christian Democratic Alliance (2018–2025)
- Spouse: José Miguel Sibaja Castro (m. 2011; div. 2017) Jeffrey Mauricio Umaña Avendaño (m. 2020)
- Children: 1
- Education: University of Costa Rica (Lic.)
- Occupation: Politician
- Profession: Political scientist
- Website: Presidential website (in Spanish)

Laura Virginia Fernández Delgado (Latin American Spanish: [ˈlawɾa βiɾˈxinja feɾˈnandes ðelˈɣaðo]; born 4 July 1986) is a Costa Rican politician and political scientist who has served as the president of Costa Rica since 2026. As the presidential candidate of the Sovereign People's Party, Fernández won the 2026 presidential election. She previously served as the minister of national planning and economic policy from 2022 to 2025, as well as the minister of the presidency from 2024 to 2025.

== Early life ==
Fernández was born on 4 July 1986 in Esparza, in the coastal province of Puntarenas. She was raised in San Jose and studied politics and democratic governance at the University of Costa Rica. She is a Catholic.

== Political career ==
From 2008 to 2010, Fernández was a consultant for the Ministry of National Planning and Economic Policy's State Reform Program as a member of the German Agency for Technical Cooperation (GIZ). She became a civil servant in the ministry in 2010 and served as a modernization and dispatch advisor until 2014. Fernández was an advisor to the Legislative Assembly from 2014 to 2018 on matters regarding public spending, finance, income, and government reforms. During the 2018 Costa Rican presidential election, Fernández was one of Mario Redondo's vice presidential candidates.

In 2018, Fernández became a researcher at the Ministry of National Planning and Economic Policy, focusing on government cooperation, public employment, and administrative reform. From 2020 to 2021, she served as director of strategic planning for the municipality of Cartago, before returning to her role as a researcher at the ministry. On 8 May 2022, President Rodrigo Chaves Robles appointed Fernández as the minister of national planning and economic policy. Chaves also appointed Fernández as Minister of the Presidency on 21 June 2024, succeeding Natalia Díaz Quintana. On 11 July 2024, she signed a decree establishing 30 July as a day to commemorate women's suffrage in Costa Rica. On 31 January 2025, Fernández resigned from her ministerial positions to be eligible to run as a presidential candidate in the 2026 Costa Rican presidential election.

== Presidency (2026–present) ==
=== Election and presidential transition ===
On 29 July 2025, Fernández officially announced her presidential candidacy as a member of the Sovereign People's Party (PPSO). She presented herself as a continuation of Chaves' presidency, as Chaves is term limited, and as a supporter of Chavism. Fernández was one of twenty presidential candidates and one of five female candidates. She was elected president with 48.3% of the vote.

Her victory was congratulated by many Latin American leaders, the Prime Minister of Spain and the U.S. Secretary of State Marco Rubio. Fernández resumed her role as Minister of the Presidency on 4 February.

Fernández would be sworn in on 8 May 2026 as the second female president of Costa Rica after Laura Chinchilla. She was sworn in before Yara Jiménez, president of the Legislative Assembly. Supporting the Chavista idea of a "Third Republic" in Costa Rica, she has pledged to reform the government, fight corruption, expand free enterprise, and promote trade, in addition to strengthening Costa Rica–Israel relations. She has pledged to build a 5,000 inmate mega-prison inspired by the Salvadoran model of Nayib Bukele.

She presented her cabinet on 5 May 2026 at Melico Salazar Theatre, and in which she included outgoing president Rodrigo Chaves as the new minister of presidency and finance.

=== Inauguration ===
Fernandez Delgado was sworn in as President on 8 May 2026. Her inauguration took place in the National Stadium of Costa Rica and attended by multiple foreign officeholders and politicians, including Felipe VI, José Raúl Mulino, Luis Abinader, Nasry Asfura, José Antonio Kast, and Isaac Herzog, among others.

=== Institutional crisis ===
Since August 2026, Costa Rica has been experiencing an institutional crisis characterised by tensions between the executive and judicial branches, particularly over the independence of the Constitutional Chamber.

The confrontation has raised concerns about the separation of powers and judicial independence. A movement known as Plantón por la Justicia Democrática has organised demonstrations in San José in defence of judicial institutions. The country's six former presidents have also called on the public to mobilise in response to the institutional crisis.

=== Cabinet ===
Ministers of the Fernández administration
Ministry	Minister	Start of term	End of term
Ministry of the Presidency	Rodrigo Chaves Robles	8 May 2026	Incumbent
Ministry of Foreign Affairs and Worship	Manuel Tovar Rivera	8 May 2026	24 September 2026
Ministry of Foreign Affairs and Worship	Ana Elena Pinto	15 October 2026	Incumbent
Ministry of Public Security	Gerald Campos Valverde	8 May 2026	Incumbent
Ministry of Public Education	José Leonardo Sánchez Hernández	8 May 2026	Incumbent
Ministry of Health	Alexander Sánchez Cabo	8 May 2026	Incumbent
Ministry of National Planning and Economic Policy	Carla Morales Rojas	8 May 2026	Incumbent
Ministry of Science, Innovation, Technology and Telecommunications	Paula Bogantes Zamora	8 May 2026	Incumbent
Ministry of Foreign Trade	Indiana Trejos Gallo	8 May 2026	Incumbent
Ministry of Environment and Energy	Mónica Navarro del Valle	8 May 2026	Incumbent
Ministry of Public Works and Transport	Efraím Zeledón Leiva	8 May 2026	Incumbent
Ministry of Labor and Social Security	Roy Thompson Chacón	8 May 2026	Incumbent
Ministry of Finance	Rodrigo Chaves Robles	8 May 2026	Incumbent
Ministry of Justice and Peace	Gabriel Aguilar Vargas	8 May 2026	Incumbent
Ministry of Economy, Industry and Commerce	María del Milagro Solórzano León	8 May 2026	Incumbent
Ministry of Agriculture and Livestock	Juan Gabriel Ramírez Guillén	8 May 2026	Incumbent
Ministry of Culture and Youth	Jorge Rodríguez Vives	8 May 2026	Incumbent
Ministry of Housing and Human Settlements	Guillermo Carazo Ramírez	8 May 2026	Incumbent
Ministry of Communication	Arnold Zamora Miranda	8 May 2026	Incumbent
Ministry of Human Development and Social Inclusion	Yorleny León Marchena	8 May 2026	Incumbent

== Political positions ==
Fernández's political positions are described as right-wing populist. She self describes as liberal in economic matters and conservative in social matters. Fernández proposed judicial reforms and the construction of a mega-prison inspired by the model of El Salvador's President Nayib Bukele to combat insecurity. A close ally of U.S. President Donald Trump, her government maintains strong ties with Washington, evidenced by her appointment of her second vice president as ambassador to the United States. Her party holds an absolute majority in the Legislative Assembly, providing a strong mandate for her agenda of sweeping state reforms, which she frames as the beginning of a "Third Republic" for Costa Rica.

== See also ==
- List of female presidents in Latin America

Political offices
Preceded by Pilar Garrido Gonzalo	Minister of National Planning and Economic Policy of Costa Rica; 2022–2025	Succeeded by Marta Esquivel Rodríguez
Preceded by Natalia Díaz Quintana	Minister of the Presidency of Costa Rica; 2024–2025	Succeeded by Herself
Preceded by Herself	Minister of the Presidency of Costa Rica; 2026	Succeeded by Rodrigo Chaves Robles
Preceded by Rodrigo Chaves Robles	President of Costa Rica; 2026–present	Incumbent
