= 2010 Costa Rican municipal elections =

- 5 December 2010

81 mayors, 470 syndics, 1856 district councillors, 8 intendants, 32 municipal district councillor and their alternates
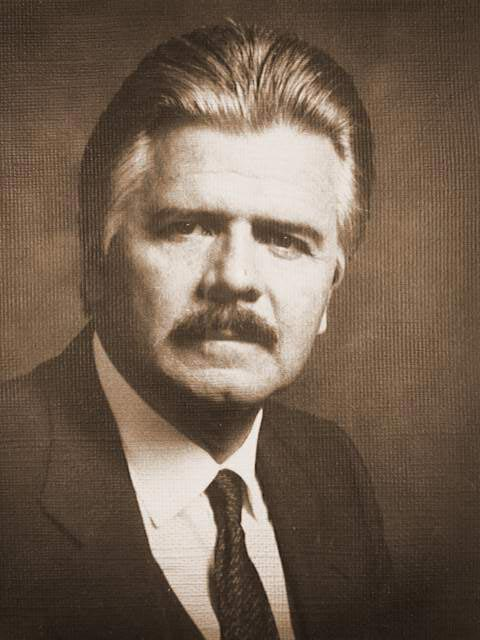

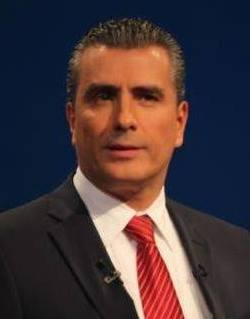

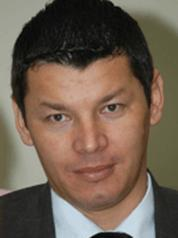

	First party	Second party	Third party
Leader	Bernal Jiménez Monge	Gerardo Vargas Rojas	Elizabeth Fonseca Corrales
Party	PLN	PUSC	PAC
Mayors	58	9	6
Mayors +/–	▼1	▼3	▲1
	Fourth party	Fifth party	Sixth party
Leader	Otto Guevara Guth	Óscar Andrés López Arias	Justo Orozco Álvarez
Party	PML	Accessibility without Exclusion	PRC
Mayors	2	2	1
Mayors +/–	▲1	▲2	▲1

Municipal elections were held in Costa Rica on 5 December 2010. These were the third municipal elections in the history of the country and the last on be held in December of the same electoral year due to an electoral reform that turned municipal election to be held mid-term. Because of this the Electoral Supreme Court mandate the constitutional period of the newly elected authorities to last for 6 years for one unique time. The election was for mayors of the 81 cantons, syndics and district councilors for all the country's districts and 8 Intendants for 8 especial autonomous districts.

Then ruling National Liberation Party was victorious retaining all but one of the mayorships it held before and 6 of the 7 provincial capitals (all except Liberia). The historical Social Christian Unity Party was the second largest municipal force as before and main opposition party Citizens' Action Party was the third largest unable to repeat its general success in presidential and legislative vote (been the second largest in both in the latest election). The liberal Libertarian Movement and the conservative Accessibility without Exclusion achieve 2 mayors each. While other two mayors came from two local forces in Curridabat and Escazú and one only mayor was elected for the religious Christian party Costa Rican Renewal.

== Results ==
=== Mayor ===
List of elected mayors by canton
Cantons	Population	Incumbent mayor	Party	Elected mayor	Party
San José	309,672	Johnny Araya	PLN	Johnny Araya	PLN
Escazú	52,372	Marco Antonio Segura	PLN	Arnoldo Valentín Barahona	YPE
Desamparados	193,478	Maureen Fallas	PLN	Maureen Fallas	PLN
Puriscal	29,407	Jorge Luis Chaves	PLN	Manuel Espinoza	PLN
Tarrazú	14,160	Iván Suárez	PLN	Bernardo Barboza	PLN
Aserrí	57,892	Mario Morales	PLN	Víctor Manuel Mora	PAC
Mora	21,666	Gilberto Monge	PLN	Gilberto Monge	PLN
Goicoechea	117,532	Óscar Enrique Figueroa	PLN	Óscar Enrique Figueroa	PLN
Santa Ana	48,879	Gerardo Oviedo	PLN	Gerardo Oviedo	PLN
Alajuelita	70,297	Tomás Poblador	PLN	Víctor Hugo Echavarría	PUSC
Vázquez de Coronado	55,585	Leonardo Herrera	PLN	Leonardo Herrera	PLN
Acosta	18,661	Ronald Ricardo Durán	PLN	Luis Alberto Durán	PLN
Tibás	72,074	Jorge Antonio Salas	PAC	Gonzalo Vargas	PLN
Moravia	50,419	Edgar Vargas	PAC	Juan Pablo Hernández	PLN
Montes de Oca	50,433	Fernando Trejos	UpC	Fernando Trejos	PRC
Turrubares	4,877	Rafael Vindas	PUSC	Bolívar Monge	PLN
Dota	6,519	José Valverde	PLN	Leonardo Chacón	PLN
Curridabat	60,889	Edgar Eduardo Mora	CSXXI	Edgar Eduardo Mora	CSXXI
Pérez Zeledón	122,187	Rosibel Ramos	PUSC	Luis Mendieta	PLN
León Cortés	11,696	Leonardo Quesada	PLN	Leonardo Quesada	PLN
Alajuela	222,853	Joyce Mary Zurcher	PLN	Roberto Hernán Thompson	PLN
San Ramón	67,975	Raúl Antonio Gómez	PLN	Mercedes Moya	PLN
Grecia	65,119	Giovanny Arguedas	PLN	Adrián Alfonso Barquero	PLN
San Mateo	5,343	Erwen Yanan Masís	PUSC	Jairo Emilio Guzmán	PLN
Atenas	22,479	Wilberth Martín Aguilar	PUSC	Wilberth Martín Aguilar	PUSC
Naranjo	37,602	Eugenio Padilla	PLN	Olga Marta Corrales	PLN
Palmares	29,766	Luis Carlos Castillo	PLN	Bernal Vargas	PLN
Poás	24,764	José Joaquín Brenes	PLN	José Joaquín Brenes	PLN
Orotina	15,705	Emilio Jesús Rodríguez	PLN	Margot Montero	PLN
San Carlos	127,140	Alfredo Córdoba	PLN	Alfredo Córdoba	PLN
Zarcero	10,845	Marco Vinicio Rodríguez	PLN	Alejandro Salas	PUSC
Valverde Vega	16,239	Víctor Manuel Rojas	PUSC	Luis Antonio Barrantes	ML
Upala	37,679	Juan Bosco Acevedo	PLN	Alejandro Ubau	PLN
Los Chiles	19,732	Santiago Millón	PLN	Álvaro Solano	PAC
Guatuso	13,045	Fidel Condega	PLN	Abelino Torres	PAC
Cartago	132,057	Rolando Alberto Rodríguez	PLN	Rolando Alberto Rodríguez	PLN
Paraíso	52,393	Marvin Solano	ML	Jorge Rodríguez	PUSC
La Unión	80,279	Julio Antonio Rojas	PLN	Julio Antonio Rojas	PLN
Jiménez	14,046	Jorge Humberto Solano	PLN	Héctor Luna	PUSC
Turrialba	68,510	Luis Alfonso Pérez	PLN	María Elena Montoya	PLN
Alvarado	12,290	Ángel Raquel López	PLN	Juan Felipe Martínez	PLN
Oreamuno	39,032	Marco Vinicio Redondo	PAC	José Rafael Huertas	PLN
El Guarco	33,788	William Adolfo Cerdas	PLN	Víctor Luis Arias	PLN
Heredia	103,894	José Manuel Ulate	PLN	José Manuel Ulate	PLN
Barva	32,440	Mercedes Hernández	PLN	Mercedes Hernández	PLN
Santo Domingo	34,748	Raúl Isidro Bolaños	PLN	Laura Prado	PLN
Santa Bárbara	29,181	Rolando Hidalgo	PLN	Melvin Alfaro	PLN
San Rafael	37,293	Alberto Vargas	PAC	Jorge Isaac Herrera	PLN
San Isidro	16,056	Elvia Dicciana Villalobos	PLN	Melvin Villalobos	PLN
Belén	19,834	Horacio Alvarado	PUSC	Horacio Alvarado	PUSC
Flores	15,038	Jenny Alfaro	PAC	Gerardo Antonio Rojas	PLN
San Pablo	20,813	Aracelly Salas	PUSC	Aracelly Salas	PUSC
Sarapiquí	57,147	Pedro Rojas	PLN	Pedro Rojas	PLN
Liberia	46,703	Carlos Luis Marín	PLN	Luis Gerardo Castañeda	PASE
Nicoya	42,189	Lorenzo Rosales	PLN	Marco Antonio Jiménez	PLN
Santa Cruz	40,821	Jorge Enrique Chavarría	PLN	Jorge Enrique Chavarría	PLN
Bagaces	15,972	Luis Ángel Rojas	PLN	Luis Ángel Rojas	PLN
Carrillo	27,306	Carlos Gerardo Cantillo	PLN	Carlos Gerardo Cantillo	PLN
Cañas	24,076	Katia María Solórzano	PLN	Lizanías Zúñiga	PAC
Abangares	16,276	Jorge Calvo	PLN	Jorge Calvo	PLN
Tilarán	17,871	Jovel Arias	PUSC	Jovel Arias	PUSC
Nandayure	9,985	Luis Gerardo Rodríguez	PUN	Carlos Arias	ML
La Cruz	16,505	Carlos Matías Gonzaga	PLN	Carlos Matías Gonzaga	PLN
Hojancha	6,534	Juan Rafael Marín	PLN	Eduardo Pineda	PAC
Puntarenas	102,504	Agne Gómez	PLN	Rafael Ángel Rodríguez	PLN
Esparza	23,963	Dagoberto Venegas	PUSC	Asdrúbal Calvo	PLN
Buenos Aires	40,139	Primo Feliciano Álvarez	PLN	Carlos Luis Mora	PLN
Montes de Oro	11,159	Álvaro Jiménez	PLN	Álvaro Jiménez	PLN
Osa	25,861	Jorge Alberto Cole	PLN	Jorge Alberto Cole	PLN
Aguirre	20,188	Óscar Octavio Monge	OLA	Lutgardo Bolaños	PLN
Golfito	33,823	Jimmy José Cubillo	PLN	Dailon Arroyo	PLN
Coto Brus	40,082	Rafael Ángel Navarro	PUSC	Rafael Ángel Navarro	PUSC
Parrita	12,112	Gerardo Roger Acuña	PLN	Freddy Garro	PLN
Corredores	37,274	Gerardo Ramírez	PLN	Xinia Marta Contreras	PLN
Garabito	10,378	Marvin Elizondo	PLN	Marvin Elizondo	PLN
Limón	89,933	Eduardo Barboza	PLN	Néstor Mattis	PLN
Pococí	103,121	Enrique Alfaro	PLN	Jorge Emilio Espinoza	PLN
Siquirres	52,409	Edgar Cambronero	PACSI	Yelgi Lavinia Verley	PASE
Talamanca	25,857	Rugeli Morales	PUSC	Melvin Gerardo Cordero	PLN
Matina	33,096	Lorenzo Colphan	PLN	Elvis Eduardo Lawson	PAC
Guácimo	34,879	Gerardo Fuentes	PLN	Gerardo Fuentes	PLN

Vote percentage
1. PLN (43.8%)
2. PUSC (14.5%)
3. PAC (12.6%)
4. Cantonal parties (10.6%)
5. ML (9.64%)
6. PASE (3.34%)
7. PRC (2.62%)
8. PIN (1.21%)
9. FA (0.68%)
10. Other (1.05%)

Party	Mayors		Popular vote	
Party	Number	Change	Votes	%
National Liberation Party	58	▼1	342,563	43.79
Social Christian Unity Party	9	▼2	113,394	14.49
Citizens' Action Party	6	▲1	98,719	12.62
Total cantonal parties	2	▼1	82,609	10.56
Libertarian Movement	2	▲1	75,441	9.64
Accessibility without Exclusion	2	New	26,163	3.34
Costa Rican Renewal Party	1	▲1	20,512	2.62
National Integration Party	0	Steady	9,434	1.21
Broad Front	0	Steady	5,354	0.68
Cartago Agrarian Union Party	0	New	3,498	0.45
Patriotic Alliance	0	New	2,277	0.29
Workers' and Peasants' Movement	0	New	1,208	0.15
Heredia Restoration Party	0	New	625	0.08
Green Ecologist Party	0	New	612	0.08
Total	81	Steady	782,409	100%

By province

Province	PLN %	PUSC %	PAC %	Reg. %	ML %	PASE %	PRC %	PIN %	FA %	AP %
San José Province	43.12	13.73	16.60	10.33	7.32	3.50	3.97	0.88	0.36	0.19
Alajuela	46.73	7.81	10.97	21.22	8.42	2.72	0.91	0.82	0.06	0.34
Cartago Province	43.84	17.94	11.13	18.24	7.31	1.08	-	-	0.46	-
Heredia	47.15	15.99	8.68	9.38	15.71	2.20	0.89	-	-	-
Guanacaste	40.39	17.04	18.13	2.93	10.08	7.17	-	4.26	-	-
Puntarenas	42.75	21.51	6.52	3.49	12.80	2.89	5.52	3.02	-	1.50
Limón	40.46	14.59	10.16	3.56	12.67	4.75	7.18	0.14	6.49	-
Total	43.79	14.49	12.62	11.32	9.64	3.34	2.62	1.21	0.68	0.29
Source: TSE

==== Municipal councils, syndics, district councils ====
Syndics
PLN	72.13%
PUSC	9.57%
PAC	5.74%
Regionalist	5.74%
ML	3.19%
PIN	1.06%
PASE	0.85%
PRC	0.85%

District councillors
PLN	49.20%
PUSC	15.13%
PAC	11.94%
Regionalist	10.51%
ML	7.91%
PASE	2.12%
PRC	1.33%
PIN	1.33%
AP	0.32%
FA	0.21%

Parties and coalitions	Popular vote			Syndics		District Councillors	
Parties and coalitions	Votes	%	±pp	Total	+/-	Total	+/-
National Liberation Party (PLN)	335,363	43.13	-2.04	339	-1	927	-13
Social Christian Unity Party (PUSC)	109,268	14.10	-3.79	45	-21	285	-75
Citizens' Action Party (PAC)	98,085	12.61	-3.42	27	+5	225	-50
Libertarian Movement (ML)	76,498	9.84	+4.29	15	+6	149	+78
Accessibility without Exclusion (PASE)	26,541	3.41	New	4	New	40	New
Costa Rican Renewal Party (PRC)	20,466	2.63	+1.03	4	+3	25	+6
United for San Carlos Coalition (PAC-FA) (UxSC)	13,365	1.72	New	3	New	24	New
United Cartago Coalition (FA-PVE-PUSC-PAC) (CCU)	11,350	1.46	New	5	New	19	New
National Integration Party (PIN)	9,616	1.24	-0.08	5	+3	25	+6
Renew Alajuela Party (PRA)	8.144	1.05	New	2	New	11	New
21st Century Curridabat (CSXXI)	7,455	0.96	+0.40	4	0	12	+4
Broad Front (FA)	5,834	0.75	+0.61	0	0	4	+3
Escazu's Progressive Yoke (YPE)	4,954	0.63	+0.03	2	+1	5	0
Ramonense Coalition (PAC-FA) (CR)	4,444	0.57	New	1	New	17	New
Cartago Agrarian Union Party (PUAC)	3,353	0.43	+0.43	1	+1	8	+8
Party of the Sun (PdS)	2,644	0.34	-0.01	0	0	11	+5
Palmarenean Union Party (PUPal)	2,561	0.33	-0.05	1	+1	10	+1
Goicoechea in Action Party (PGEA)	2,494	0.32	-0.01	0	0	4	0
Santo Domingo Advancement Movement (MAS)	2,273	0.29	New	1	New	9	New
Fuenteovejuna Civic Party of Tibás (PCFT)	2,228	0.29	New	1	New	1	New
Patriotic Alliance (AP)	2,218	0.29	New	0	New	6	New
Ateniense Union Party (PUA)	2,077	0.27	New	2	New	16	New
Desamparados Cantonal Accord Party (PACD)	1,950	0.25	New	0	New	3	New
All for Flores Party (TxF)	1,808	0.23	New	1	New	4	New
Authentic Labourer of Coronado Party (PALABRA)	1,747	0.22	+0.13	0	0	4	+4
Poaseña Union Party (PUNPO)	1,640	0.21	+0.17	0	0	8	+8
The Bridge and Paths of Mora (PYCM)	1,576	0.20	-0.06	1	0	4	-2
Liberian Union Coalition (PUSC-ML) (CUL)	1,322	0.17	New	0	New	1	New
United Montes de Oca Coalition (FA-PH) (CUL)	1,309	0.17	New	0	New	4	New
Unique Abangarean Party (PUAB)	1,119	0.14	New	0	New	3	New
Workers' and Peasants' Movement (MTC)	1,118	0.14	New	0	New	1	New
Tarrazú First Party (PTP)	1,084	0.14	New	0	New	3	New
Social Active Organization (OSA)	1,062	0.14	New	0	New	4	New
Naranjenean Action Party (PANAR)	956	0.12	New	0	New	0	New
United Barva Coalition (FA-PASE) (CBU)	952	0.12	New	0	New	2	New
Ecological Garabito Party (PEG)	906	0.12	+0.12	1	+1	3	+3
Green Ecologist Party (PVE)	906	0.12	-0.43	0	0	0	-5
Belemite Independent Party (PIB)	886	0.11	-0.01	0	0	2	+1
Autonomous Oromontan Party (PAO)	875	0.11	+0.04	1	+1	3	+3
Barbarenean Integration Party (PINBAR)	867	0.11	-0.19	0	-2	0	-10
Heredia Restoration Party (PREH)	854	0.11	New	0	New	0	New
Cartago Transparency Party (PTCAR)	850	0.11	New	0	New	0	New
Cantonal Action Independent Siquirres Party (PACSI)	833	0.11	-0.21	0	New	0	New
Zarcereña Alliance Coalition (PAC-FA) (CAZ)	697	0.09	New	0	New	2	New
Quepeña Action Party (PAQ)	332	0.04	-0.07	0	0	0	-2
United Talamanca Party (PTU)	240	0.03	New	0	New	0	New
Aguirre Labour Organization Party (OLA)	59	0.01	-0.22	0	-2	0	-4
Total	767,769	100.00		470	+2	1884	+8
Invalid votes	18,799	2.36	-0.49				
Votes cast / turnout	786,568	27.82	+4.21				
Abstentions	2,066,319	72.18					
Registered voters	2,852,887						

== See also ==
- Local government in Costa Rica
- List of mayors in Costa Rica
