= Carmen Muñoz =

Costa Rican politician and activist

Carmen Muñoz is a Costa Rican politician and activist. She is the Vice-Minister Of Government and Police named by president Luis Guillermo Solís and commissioned to separate and turn it into an independent ministry of the Ministry of Public Security. She was a congresswoman in the Legislative Assembly of Costa Rica where she headed the Citizen Action Party. To date Muñoz is the only out lesbian in parliament or in charge of a ministry.

Muñoz was born in Alajuelita in Costa Rica. Her father worked at the Costa Rican Institute of Electricity and her mother was a housewife; she has seven brothers. She attended Saint Felipe School and the Liceo of Alajuelita. She left home at the age of fifteen to fight in Nicaragua with the Sandinistas to overthrow Anastasio Somoza. Afterwards she traveled to Cuba where she studied history, philosophy and political economy at the Julio Mella school. When she returned she joined the People's Vanguard Party and studied graphic design at the National Learning Institute (INA). In 2001 she entered the Citizens' Action Party.

Muñoz held several positions in her party including district president, provincial delegate and member of the commission of women of the Citizen Action Party. She produced the radio program Las mujeres no and coordinated the Patriotic Canton Committee against the free trade treaty with the United States in the period leading up to Costa Rica's referendum on the treaty.

Muñoz was elected deputy by the Citizen Action Party for 2010-2014 and was their parliamentary spokesman, the first of the opposition for the 2013-2014 period. Muñoz is characterized by her support for Feminism and the fight for equality for the LGBTIQ community, as well as promoting recognition of same-sex unions.

== Controversy ==
In May 2013 the congressman and evangelic minister Justo Orozco of the Christian Costa Rican Renewal proposed a motion to exclude Muñoz from the legislative commission that was going to analyse the law project to legalize the unions of same-sex couples, due to what he saw as a conflict of interest. The following day the Legislature gave Muñoz an ovation for her work as a congresswoman and she received flowers from congressmen on both the right and left.

Preceded by: Leda Zamora Chaves; 2006-2010	Deputy of the Legislative Assembly of Costa Rica (10th place for San José); 2010-2014	Succeeded by: Juan Luis Jiménez Succar; 2014-2018
