= Referendums in Costa Rica =

Referendums in Costa Rica are regulated by law. The main juridical body that regulates is the Law of Referendum or Law 8492. To date, the only nationwide referendum held since the current Constitution was adopted and the aforementioned referendum regulatory law promulgated was the 2007 Costa Rican Dominican Republic – Central America Free Trade Agreement referendum.

== Process ==
To submit a bill to referendum, the petition has to be made into the Tribunal Supremo de Elecciones (TSE), which would transfer the bill to Technical Services which would report if the bill can be submitted to referendum according to the current legislation. If allowed, then the TSE would allow the recollection of signatures that has to be at least 5% of the electoral census (around 167,000 signatures) for a period of nine months extendable to one extra month if requested once.

If the signatures are gathered in time, the TSE will establish a date for the referendum that cannot coincide with a presidential election. In order for the referendum to be binding it has to have at least 30% of voters participation in common laws and 40% in constitutional reforms and international treaties. Besides, bills regarding taxes, pensions, administrative matters and budgets can't be subject of referendums according to the law, nor can be any legislation regarding human rights as established by a Constitutional Court's ruling.

The Municipal Code also allows for the realization of local referendums, plebiscites and cabildos. These require two-thirds of the votes from the municipality's city council or 5% of residents signatures gathered.

== History ==
=== Realized referendums ===
Costa Rica's only referendum to this date on the modern era has been the 2007 Costa Rican Dominican Republic – Central America Free Trade Agreement referendum. Promoted by CAFTA opponent José Miguel Corrales Bolaños as a strategy to take the discussion out of the Legislative Assembly where pro-CAFTA parties had a majority, the Referendum split public opinion and polarized voters, with the main political parties taking positions in favor or against. The "yes" won over the "no" with 51% over 48%.

=== Stopped referendums ===
The Civil Unions Act referendum promoted by conservative and religious groups in 2008 to stop the approval on Parliament of the Civil Unions Act which would legalized same-sex civil partnerships was green-lighted by TSE and had the support of conservative parties, the Catholic Church and evangelical churches. The tentative date for the referendum was set on December 5, 2010. However the Citizens' Action Party, the Ombudsman Office and the LGBT-organization Diversity Movement appealed the decision presenting an amparo in the Constitutional Court, or Fourth Chamber. The Court's ruled in favor of the plaintiffs and declared the referendum unconstitutional as Human Rights matters ca't be submitted to referendum as minorities will be in a disadvantage over the votes of majorities. Same-sex unions including marriage were approved by a Supreme Court ruling on 2018.

Another similar case was the Animal Welfare Act which meant to harden the penalties for animal cruelty and was discussed in the Parliament but advanced slowly in part because of the opposition and filibusterism of the Libertarian Movement that opposed it. Frustrated by it slow advance, in 2016 animal rights activists promoted the submitting of the bill to referendum. The TSE allowed the recollection of signatures which was achieved on record time, but a constitutional check made by deputies opposing the bill which found out constitutional frictions on the bill caused the TSE to disallow the referendum arguing that it was unconstitutional. The law was approved by the Legislative Assembly a year later.

The Constituent Assembly Convocation Act promoted by the movement New Constitution for Costa Rica led by ex deputy Alex Solís and other political figures, and seeks to have a new Constituent Assembly to draft and approve a new constitution The amparo was presented by scholar and researcher Esperanza Tasies arguing that the current Referendum Law does not allows for total changes in the Constitution, only for partial ones. The Constitutional Court sustained the argument and declared that a Constituent Assembly can only be convened by legislative act.

=== Authorized referendums ===
One of the many public monopolies of Costa Rica is in oil refining, legally in the exclusive hands of the Costa Rican Oil Refinery (RECOPE). In mid-2016 the TSE allowed the citizen group No More RECOPE to gathered signatures for the referendum on ending RECOPE's monopoly. The Chamber of Fuel Enterprises presented an appeal into the Constitutional Court against the referendum arguing it will increase oil prices, however it was rejected in 2018. The National Energetic Resources Advantage Act promoted by Costa Rica Institute of Technology's teacher Carlos Roldán and seeks to finish the ban on oil exploration and exploitation the country has. An amparo was presented by deputy Paola Vega of the ecologist Citizens' Action Party. However the amparo was rejected. As of March 2020 (only three months before the sign recollection period ends) organizers report that less than 10% of signatures have been collected.

=== Referendums under study of the Constitutional Court ===
The Vital Minimal Wage Act which was promoted by some of the labor unions and would take into account the living costs for the calculation of minimal wage. An amparo was presented against it by the Costa Rican Union of Chambers.

=== Rejected referéndums ===
It was unanimously rejected by the TSE the realization of referendums for recall elections against the President and the deputies, one presented in 2015 and two presented in 2018, in all cases the TSE argued that the current legislation and Constitution do not allow recall elections except for mayors.

A request to submit to referendum Costa Rica's signature of the Global Compact for Migration was rejected arguing that administrative decisions can't be subject of referendum according to current laws.

== Recall elections ==
Mayors in Costa Rica can be submitted to recall elections. This requires at least a two-thirds votes of the Municipal Council or enough signatures gathered among the residents. Two recall elections had happened; one in the Perez Zeledon Canton in 2011 and one in the Paraiso Canton in 2018. Although in both won the "yes" option, the first succeeded but the second didn't got enough votes to be binding (it requires two-thirds of voters for the "yes" option and at least 10% of the census). However Paraiso's mayor resign on his own anyway due to corruption charges.
