= 2009 Dakar Rally =

Off-road motorsport event in Argentina and Chile

← Previous event	Next event →
- Host country: Argentina; Chile

Results
- Cars winner: (South Africa) Giniel de Villiers (Germany) Dirk von Zitzewitz; Volkswagen
- Bikes winner: (Spain) Marc Coma; KTM
- Quads winner: (Czech Republic) Josef Macháček; Yamaha
- Trucks winner: (Russia) Firdaus Kabirov (Russia) Aydar Belyaev (Russia) Andrey Mokeev; Kamaz

The 2009 Dakar Rally was the 31st running of the Dakar Rally. The race began on 3 January 2009, and took place across Argentina and Chile. The rally was for the first time to take place outside of Europe and Africa as the location was changed by organizers due to concerns about possible terrorist attacks that resulted in the postponement and relocation of the previous year's race In addition to motorcycle, automobile, and truck categories, a separate quad (all-terrain vehicle) class was added for the first time (previously a subdivision of the motorbike category).

Étienne Lavigne, the race director of the rally, first announced the new race location in February 2008 around the same time as the previous year's rescheduled and relocated race was held for competitors. He said, "Dakar competitors are going to discover new territory, new scenery, but with the same spirit of competition and adventure, with very hard stages."

== Entrants ==
540 teams from 50 nations competed in the rally. Teams underwent administrative and technical checks in Buenos Aires between 31 December and 2 January. Afterwards, 217 motorcycles, 25 all-terrain vehicle, 177 cars, and 81 trucks driven by a total of 837 people were approved to start.

== Route ==
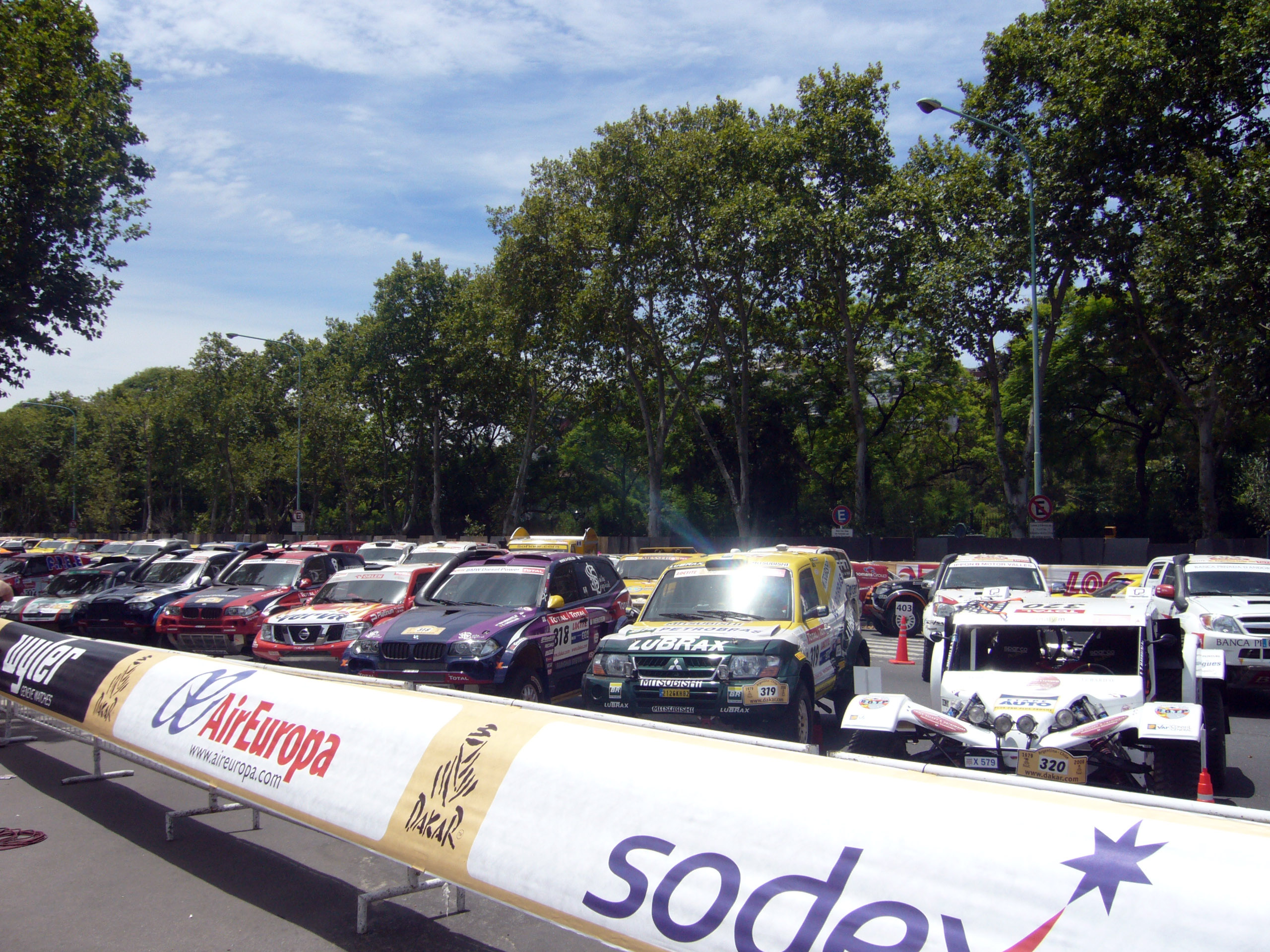
Cars before the event began

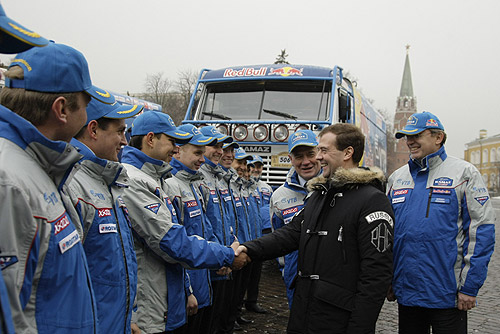
Russian president Dmitry Medvedev meets with the KAMAZ-Master team at the Moscow Kremlin on 28 January 2009.

The race began in Buenos Aires, Argentina with a symbolic start that took place on 2 January in downtown Buenos Aires, attracting an estimated crowd of 500,000 fans. The total racing distance is more than 9,578 kilometres (5,951 mi), of which 5,652 kilometres (3,512 mi) is timed special stage. There will be a rest day in Valparaíso, Chile on 10 January. There are ten stages in Argentina, and three in Chile.

=== Stages ===
Stage	Date	From	To	Connection		Special		Connection		Total		Stage winners			
Stage	Date	From	To	km	mi	km	mi	km	mi	km	mi	Bikes	Quads	Cars	Trucks
1	3 January	(Argentina) Buenos Aires	(Argentina) Santa Rosa	196	122	371	231	166	103	733	455	(Spain) M. Coma	(France) C. Declerck	(Qatar) N. Al-Attiyah	(Netherlands) M. van Vliet
2	4 January	(Argentina) Santa Rosa	(Argentina) Puerto Madryn	0	0	237	147	600	373	837	520	(Netherlands) F. Verhoeven	(France) C. Declerck	(Spain) C. Sainz	(Netherlands) G. de Rooy
3	5 January	(Argentina) Puerto Madryn	(Argentina) Jacobacci	70	43	616	383	8	5	694	431	(Spain) M. Coma	(Czech Republic) J. Macháček	(Qatar) N. Al-Attiyah	(Russia) V. Chagin
4	6 January	(Argentina) Jacobacci	(Argentina) Neuquén	4	2	459	285	25	16	488	303	(Spain) M. Coma	(Spain) J. M. González	(Spain) C. Sainz	(Netherlands) G. de Rooy
5	7 January	(Argentina) Neuquén	(Argentina) San Rafael	173	107	506	314	84	52	763	474	(United States) J. Street	(Spain) J. M. González	(South Africa) G. de Villiers	(Russia) F. Kabirov
6	8 January	(Argentina) San Rafael	(Argentina) Mendoza	76	47	395	245	154	96	625	388	(France) C. Despres	(Czech Republic) J. Macháček	(South Africa) G. de Villiers	(Russia) V. Chagin
7	9 January	(Argentina) Mendoza	(Chile) Valparaíso	80	50	419	260	317	197	816	507	(Chile) F. López	(Argentina) M. Patronelli	(Spain) C. Sainz	Stage cancelled
	10 January	(Chile) Valparaíso		Rest Day											
8	11 January	(Chile) Valparaíso	(Chile) La Serena	245	152	294	183	113	70	652	405	(France) C. Despres	(Czech Republic) J. Macháček	(Spain) C. Sainz	(Netherlands) G. de Rooy
9	12 January	(Chile) La Serena	(Chile) Copiapó	88	55	449	279	0	0	537	334	(Netherlands) F. Verhoeven	(Czech Republic) J. Macháček	(Spain) C. Sainz	(Russia) F. Kabirov
10	13 January	(Chile) Copiapó	(Chile) Copiapó	20	12	666	414	0	0	686	426	(Spain) J. Viladoms	(Argentina) M. Patronelli	(Spain) C. Sainz	(Russia) V. Chagin
11	14 January	(Chile) Copiapó	(Argentina) Fiambalá	20	12	215	134	445	277	680	423	Stage cancelled			
12	15 January	(Argentina) Fiambalá	(Argentina) La Rioja	4	2	253	157	261	162	518	322	(France) C. Despres	(Argentina) M. Patronelli	(South Africa) G. de Villiers	(Russia) V. Chagin
13	16 January	(Argentina) La Rioja	(Argentina) Córdoba	161	100	545	339	47	29	753	468	(France) C. Despres	(Spain) C. Avendaño	(Spain) N. Roma	(Russia) F. Kabirov
14	17 January	(Argentina) Córdoba	(Argentina) Buenos Aires	224	139	227	141	341	212	792	492	(Portugal) H. Rodrigues	(Spain) J. M. Peña	(South Africa) G. de Villiers	(Russia) F. Kabirov
				km	mi	km	mi	km	mi	km	mi				

Due to heavy fog and the need to cross the border between Chile and Argentina, the competitive element of Stage 11 was cancelled.

== Stage results ==
=== Motorcycles ===
	Stage result					General classification				
Stage	Pos	Competitor	Make	Time	Difference	Pos	Competitor	Make	Time	Difference
1	1	M. Coma (ESP)	KTM	2h 46' 17"	+ 00' 00"	1	M. Coma (ESP)	KTM	2h 46' 17"	+ 00' 00"
1	2	J. Czachor (POL)	KTM	3h 08' 22"	+ 22' 05"	2	J. Czachor (POL)	KTM	3h 08' 22"	+ 22' 05"
1	3	M. Stanovnik (SLO)	KTM	3h 10' 59"	+ 24' 42"	3	M. Stanovnik (SLO)	KTM	3h 10' 59"	+ 24' 42"
2	1	F. Verhoeven (NED)	KTM	2h 14' 48"	+ 00' 00"	1	M. Coma (ESP)	KTM	5h 13' 32"	+ 00' 00"
2	2	C. Despres (FRA)	KTM	2h 15' 29	+ 00' 41"	2	F. Verhoeven (NED)	KTM	5h 27' 19"	+ 13' 47"
2	3	D. Fretigne (FRA)	Yamaha	2h 15' 52"	+ 01' 04"	3	D. Fretigne (FRA)	Yamaha	5h 30' 23"	+ 16' 51"
3	1	M. Coma (ESP)	KTM	5h 18' 17"	+ 00' 00"	1	M. Coma (ESP)	KTM	10h 31' 49"	+ 00' 00"
3	2	P.A. Ullevålseter (NOR)	KTM	5h 36' 06"	+ 17' 49"	2	D. Fretigne (FRA)	Yamaha	11h 11' 00"	+ 39' 11"
3	3	J. Viladoms (ESP)	KTM	5h 36' 06"	+ 17' 49"	3	P.A. Ullevålseter (NOR)	KTM	11h 14' 14"	+ 42' 25"
4	1	M. Coma (ESP)	KTM	4h 09' 32"	+ 00' 00"	1	M. Coma (ESP)	KTM	14h 41' 21"	+ 00' 00"
4	2	C. Despres (FRA)	KTM	4h 10' 49"	+ 01' 17"	2	J. Street (USA)	KTM	15h 24' 18"	+ 42' 57"; 3' 00" Penalty
4	3	J. Street (USA)	KTM	4h 10' 53"	+ 01' 21"	3	D. Fretigne (FRA)	Yamaha	15h 25' 03"	+ 43' 42"
5	1	J. Street (USA)	KTM	6h 41' 06"	+ 00' 00"	1	M. Coma (ESP)	KTM	21h 38' 12"	+ 00' 00"
5	2	F. Verhoeven (NED)	KTM	6h 46' 59"	+ 05' 53"	2	J. Street (USA)	KTM	22h 05' 24"	+ 27' 12"
5	3	F. López (CHI)	KTM	6h 48' 40"	+ 07' 34"	3	D. Fretigne (FRA)	Yamaha	22h 17' 21"	+ 39' 09"
6	1	C. Despres (FRA)	KTM	2h 03' 20"	+ 00' 00"	1	M. Coma (ESP)	KTM	23h 43' 41"	+ 00' 00"
6	2	M. Coma (ESP)	KTM	2h 05' 29"	+ 02' 09"	2	J. Street (USA)	KTM	24h 24' 10"	+ 40' 29"
6	3	J. Viladoms (ESP)	KTM	2h 08' 35"	+ 05' 15"	3	D. Fretigne (FRA)	Yamaha	24h 31' 11"	+ 47' 30"
7	1	F. López (CHI)	KTM	2h 36' 09"	+ 00' 00"	1	M. Coma (ESP)	KTM	26h 23' 47"	+ 00' 00"
7	2	M. Coma (ESP)	KTM	2h 40' 06"	+ 03' 57"	2	J. Street (USA)	KTM	27h 15' 09"	+ 51' 22"
7	3	C. Despres (FRA)	KTM	2h 41' 30"	+ 05' 21"	3	D. Fretigne (FRA)	Yamaha	27h 16' 18"	+ 52' 31"
8	1	C. Despres (FRA)	KTM	4h 07' 39"	+ 00' 00"	1	M. Coma (ESP)	KTM	30h 33' 15"	+ 00' 00"
8	2	M. Coma (ESP)	KTM	4h 09' 28"	+ 01' 49"	2	D. Fretigne (FRA)	Yamaha	31h 39' 43"	+ 1h 06' 28"
8	3	F. López (CHI)	KTM	4h 10' 35"	+ 02' 56"	3	C. Despres (FRA)	KTM	32h 06' 49"	+ 1h 33' 34"
9	1	F. Verhoeven (NED)	KTM	6h 26' 33"	+ 00' 00"	1	M. Coma (ESP)	KTM	37h 04' 47"	+ 00' 00"
9	2	D. Fretigne (FRA)	Yamaha	6h 29' 42"	+ 03' 09"	2	D. Fretigne (FRA)	Yamaha	37h 34' 20"	+ 1h 04' 38"
9	3	F. López (CHI)	KTM	6h 40' 13"	+ 03' 40"	3	C. Despres (FRA)	KTM	38h 04' 20"	+ 1h 34' 38"
10	1	J. Viladoms (ESP)	KTM	6h 35' 26"	+ 00' 00"	1	M. Coma (ESP)	KTM	43h 52' 30"	+ 00' 00"
10	2	A. Duclos (FRA)	KTM	6h 36' 22"	+ 01' 06"	2	D. Fretigne (FRA)	Yamaha	45h 17' 20"	+ 1h 24' 50"
10	3	P.A. Ullevålseter (NOR)	KTM	6h 37' 33"	+ 02' 07"	3	C. Despres (FRA)	KTM	45h 23' 41"	+ 1h 31' 11"; 3' 00" Penalty
12	1	C. Despres (FRA)	KTM	3h 57' 37"	+ 00' 00"	1	M. Coma (ESP)	KTM	47h 51' 30"	+ 00' 00"
12	2	M. Coma (ESP)	KTM	3h 59' 00"	+ 01' 23"	2	C. Despres (FRA)	KTM	49h 21' 18"	+ 1h 29' 48"; Penalty 3' 00"
12	3	G. Farres Guell (ESP)	KTM	4h 07' 24"	+ 09' 47"	3	D. Fretigne (FRA)	Yamaha	49h 25' 25"	+ 1h 33' 55"
13	1	C. Despres (FRA)	KTM	2h 33' 35"	+ 00' 00"	1	M. Coma (ESP)	KTM	50h 26' 50"	+ 00' 00"
13	2	M. Coma (ESP)	KTM	2h 35' 20"	+ 01' 45"	2	C. Despres (FRA)	KTM	51h 54' 53"	+ 1h 28' 03"; Penalty 3' 00"
13	3	D. Fretigne (FRA)	Yamaha	2h 36' 12"	+ 02' 37"	3	D. Fretigne (FRA)	Yamaha	52h 01' 37"	+ 1h 34' 37"
14	1	H. Rodrigues (POR)	KTM	1h 42' 37"	+ 00' 00"	1	M. Coma (ESP)	KTM	52h 14' 33"	+ 00' 00"
14	2	P.A. Ullevålseter (NOR)	KTM	1h 44' 44"	+ 02' 07"	2	C. Despres (FRA)	KTM	53h 40' 11"	+ 1h 25' 38"; Penalty 3' 00"
14	3	C. Despres (FRA)	KTM	1h 45' 18"	+ 02' 41"	3	D. Fretigne (FRA)	Yamaha	53h 53' 29"	+ 1h 38' 56"

=== Quads ===
	Stage result					General classification				
Stage	Pos	Competitor	Make	Time	Difference	Pos	Competitor	Make	Time	Difference
1	1	C. Declerck (FRA)	Yamaha	4h 00' 16"	+ 00' 00"	1	C. Declerck (FRA)	Yamaha	4h 00' 16"	+ 00' 00"
1	2	J. Macháček (CZE)	Yamaha	4h 13' 12"	+ 12' 56"	2	J. Macháček (CZE)	Yamaha	4h 13' 12"	+ 12' 56"
1	3	L. Henderson (URU)	Suzuki	4h 16' 06"	+ 15' 50"	3	L. Henderson (URU)	Suzuki	4h 16' 06"	+ 15' 50"
2	1	C. Declerck (FRA)	Yamaha	2h 55' 58"	+ 00' 00"	1	C. Declerck (FRA)	Yamaha	6h 56' 14"	+ 00' 00"
2	2	H. Deltrieu (FRA)	Polaris	2h 58' 38"	+ 02' 40"	2	R. Sonik (POL)	Yamaha	7h 20' 51"	+ 24' 37"
2	3	R. Sonik (POL)	Yamaha	5h 29' 21"	+ 03' 23"	3	H. Deltrieu (FRA)	Polaris	7h 26' 49"	+ 30' 35"
3	1	J. Macháček (CZE)	Yamaha	6h 41' 59"	+ 00' 00"	1	C. Declerck (FRA)	Yamaha	13h 40' 00"	+ 00' 00"
3	2	C. Declerck (FRA)	Yamaha	6h 43' 46"	+ 01' 47"	2	J. Macháček (CZE)	Yamaha	14h 16' 47"	+ 36' 47"; 6' 00" Penalty
3	3	J.M. González (ESP)	Yamaha	6h 54' 54"	+ 12' 55"	3	J.M. González (ESP)	Yamaha	14h 27' 45"	+ 47' 45"
4	1	J.M. González (ESP)	Yamaha	5h 18' 33"	+ 00' 00"	1	C. Declerck (FRA)	Yamaha	19h 14' 51"	+ 00' 00"
4	2	C. Declerck (FRA)	Yamaha	5h 34' 51"	+ 16'18"	2	J.M. González (ESP)	Yamaha	19h 46' 18"	+ 31' 27"
4	3	E. Carlini (FRA)	Polaris	5h 37' 32"	+ 18' 59"	3	J. Macháček (CZE)	Yamaha	20h 04' 25"	+ 49' 34"
5	1	J.M. González (ESP)	Yamaha	8h 52' 38"	+ 00' 00"	1	J.M. González (ESP)	Yamaha	28h 38' 56"	+ 00' 00"
5	2	J. Macháček (CZE)	Yamaha	9h 16' 44"	24' 06"	2	J. Macháček (CZE)	Yamaha	29h 21' 09"	+ 42' 13"
5	3	M. Patronelli (ARG)	Can-Am	10h 04' 16"	1h 11' 38"	3	C. Declerck (FRA)	Yamaha	29h 37' 33"	+ 58' 37"
6	1	J. Macháček (CZE)	Yamaha	2h 49' 47"	00' 00"	1	J.M. González (ESP)	Yamaha	31h 38' 47"	+ 00' 00"
6	2	J.M. González (ESP)	Yamaha	2h 59' 51"	+ 10' 04"	2	J. Macháček (CZE)	Yamaha	32h 10' 56"	+ 32' 09"; 6' 00" Penalty
6	3	H. Deltrieu (FRA)	Polaris	3h 05' 01"	+ 15' 14"	3	C. Declerck (FRA)	Yamaha	32h 59' 12"	+ 1h 20' 25"
7	1	M. Patronelli (ARG)	Can-Am	3h 41' 37"	+ 00' 00"	1	J. Macháček (CZE)	Yamaha	36h 22' 01"	+ 00' 00"; 6' 00" Penalty
7	2	L. Henderson (URU)	Suzuki	3h 55' 38"	+ 14 01"	2	M. Patronelli (ARG)	Can-Am	38h 49' 33"	+ 2h 27' 32"; 3' 00" Penalty
7	3	H. Deltrieu (FRA)	Polaris	4h 02' 42"	+ 21 05"	3	R. Sonik (POL)	Yamaha	40h 53' 28"	+ 4h 31' 27"; 1h 53' 00" Penalty
8	1	J. Macháček (CZE)	Yamaha	4h 49' 24"	+ 00' 00"	1	J. Macháček (CZE)	Yamaha	41h 11' 25"	+ 00' 00"; 6' 00" Penalty
8	2	M. Patronelli (ARG)	Can-Am	4h 52' 25"	+ 02' 51"	2	M. Patronelli (ARG)	Can-Am	43h 41' 48"	+ 2h 30' 23"; 3' 00" Penalty
8	3	H. Deltrieu (FRA)	Polaris	4h 56' 24"	+ 07' 00"	3	R. Sonik (POL)	Yamaha	44h 06' 55"	+ 2h 55' 30"
9	1	J. Macháček (CZE)	Yamaha	8h 20' 54"	+ 00' 00"	1	J. Macháček (CZE)	Yamaha	49h 32' 19"	+ 00' 00"; 6' 00" Penalty
9	2	M. Patronelli (ARG)	Can-Am	8h 21' 33"	+ 00' 39"	2	M. Patronelli (ARG)	Can-Am	52h 03' 21"	+ 2h 31' 02"; 3' 00" Penalty
9	3	H. Deltrieu (FRA)	Polaris	8h 38' 20"	+ 17' 26"	3	R. Sonik (POL)	Yamaha	53h 01' 40"	+ 3h 09' 21"; 3' 00" Penalty
10	1	M. Patronelli (ARG)	Can-Am	8h 20' 30"	+ 00' 00"	1	J. Macháček (CZE)	Yamaha	57h 53' 17"	+ 00' 00"; 6' 00" Penalty
10	2	J. Macháček (CZE)	Yamaha	8h 20' 58"	+ 00' 28"	2	M. Patronelli (ARG)	Can-Am	60h 23' 51"	+ 2h 30' 34"; 3' 00" Penalty
10	3	H. Deltrieu (FRA)	Polaris	9h 13' 03"	+ 52' 38"	3	R. Sonik (POL)	Yamaha	63h 08' 03"	+ 5h 14' 46"; 3' 00" Penalty
12	1	M. Patronelli (ARG)	Can-Am	4h 42' 58"	+ 00' 00"	1	J. Macháček (CZE)	Yamaha	63h 12' 11"	+ 00' 00"; 6' 00" Penalty
12	2	J. Macháček (CZE)	Yamaha	5h 18' 54"	+ 35' 56"	2	M. Patronelli (ARG)	Can-Am	65h 06' 49"	+ 1h 54' 38"; 3' 00" Penalty
12	3	H. Deltrieu (FRA)	Polaris	5h 19' 00"	+ 36' 02"	3	R. Sonik (POL)	Yamaha	70h 18' 28"	+ 7h 06' 17"; 3' 00" Penalty
13	1	C. Avendaño (ESP)	Suzuki	2h 53' 12"	+ 00' 00"	1	J. Macháček (CZE)	Yamaha	66h 07' 35"	+ 00' 00"; 6' 00" Penalty
13	2	J. Macháček (CZE)	Yamaha	2h 55' 24"	+ 02' 12"	2	M. Patronelli (ARG)	Can-Am	68h 27' 55"	+ 2h 20' 20"; 3' 00" Penalty
13	3	H. Deltrieu (FRA)	Polaris	2h 56' 01"	+ 02' 49"	3	R. Sonik (POL)	Yamaha	73h 27' 50"	+ 7h 20' 15"; 3' 00" Penalty
14	1	J.M. Peña (ESP)	Yamaha	2h 14' 23"	+ 00' 00"	1	J. Macháček (CZE)	Yamaha	68h 22' 06"	+ 00' 00"; 6' 00" Penalty
14	2	J. Macháček (CZE)	Yamaha	2h 14' 31"	+ 00' 08"	2	M. Patronelli (ARG)	Can-Am	70h 56' 06"	+ 2h 34' 00"; 3' 00" Penalty
14	3	H. Deltrieu (FRA)	Polaris	2h 16' 13"	+ 01' 50"	3	R. Sonik (POL)	Yamaha	76h 04' 40"	+ 7h 42' 34"; 3' 00" Penalty

=== Cars ===
	Stage result					General classification				
Stage	Pos	Competitor	Make	Time	Difference	Pos	Competitor	Make	Time	Difference
1	1	N. Al-Attiyah (QAT); T. Thörner (SWE)	BMW	2h 36' 15"	+ 00' 00"	1	N. Al-Attiyah (QAT); T. Thörner (SWE)	BMW	2h 36' 15"	+ 00' 00"
1	2	C. Sainz (ESP); M. Perin (FRA)	Volkswagen	2h 38' 32"	+ 02' 17"	2	C. Sainz (ESP); M. Perin (FRA)	Volkswagen	2h 38' 32"	+ 02' 17"
1	3	G. De Villiers (RSA); D. von Zitzewitz (GER)	Volkswagen	2h 38' 55"	+ 02' 40"	3	G. De Villiers (RSA); D. von Zitzewitz (GER)	Volkswagen	2h 38' 55"	+ 02' 40"
2	1	C. Sainz (ESP); M. Perin (FRA)	Volkswagen	1h 56' 14"	+ 00' 00"	1	C. Sainz (ESP); M. Perin (FRA)	Volkswagen	4h 34' 36"	+ 00' 00"
2	2	S. Peterhansel (FRA); J-P. Cottret (FRA)	Mitsubishi	1h 57' 28"	+ 01' 14"	2	G. De Villiers (RSA); D. von Zitzewitz (GER)	Volkswagen	4h 37' 05"	+ 02' 19"
2	3	G. De Villiers (RSA); D. von Zitzewitz (GER)	Volkswagen	1h 58' 10"	+ 01' 56"	3	S. Peterhansel (FRA); J-P. Cottret (FRA)	Mitsubishi	4h 38' 37"	+ 03' 51"
3	1	N. Al-Attiyah (QAT); T. Thörner (SWE)	BMW	4h 29' 27"	+ 00' 00"	1	C. Sainz (ESP); M. Perin (FRA)	Volkswagen	9h 04' 48"	+ 00' 00"
3	2	C. Sainz (ESP); M. Perin (FRA)	Volkswagen	4h 30' 02"	+ 00' 35"	2	N. Al-Attiyah (QAT); T. Thörner (SWE)	BMW	9h 08' 28"	+ 03' 40"
3	3	D. Depping (GER); T. Gottschalk (GER)	Volkswagen	4h 31' 07"	+ 01' 40"	3	G. De Villiers (RSA); D. von Zitzewitz (GER)	Volkswagen	9h 10' 33"	+ 05' 45"
4	1	C. Sainz (ESP); M. Perin (FRA)	Volkswagen	3h 42' 57"	+ 00' 00"	1	C. Sainz (ESP); M. Perin (FRA)	Volkswagen	12h 47' 45"	+ 00' 00"
4	2	N. Al-Attiyah (QAT); T. Thörner (SWE)	BMW	3h 43' 03"	+ 00' 06"	2	N. Al-Attiyah (QAT); T. Thörner (SWE)	BMW	12h 51' 31"	+ 03' 46"
4	3	L. Alphand (FRA); G. Picard (FRA)	Mitsubishi	3h 45' 21"	+ 02' 24"	3	G. De Villiers (RSA); D. von Zitzewitz (GER)	Volkswagen	12h 59' 18"	+ 11' 33"
5	1	G. De Villiers (RSA); D. von Zitzewitz (GER)	Volkswagen	5h 47' 43"	+ 00' 00"	1	N. Al-Attiyah (QAT); T. Thörner (SWE)	BMW	18h 44' 37"	+ 00' 00"
5	2	D. Depping (GER); T. Gottschalk (GER)	Volkswagen	5h 50' 01"	+ 02' 18"	2	G. De Villiers (RSA); D. von Zitzewitz (GER)	Volkswagen	18h 47' 01"	+ 02' 24"
5	3	R. Gordon (USA); A. Grider (USA)	Hummer	5h 51' 55"	+ 04' 12"	3	C. Sainz (ESP); M. Perin (FRA)	Volkswagen	18h 51' 10"	+ 06' 33"
6	1	G. De Villiers (RSA); D. von Zitzewitz (GER)	Volkswagen	2h 12' 33"	+ 00' 00"	1	G. De Villiers (RSA); D. von Zitzewitz (GER)	Volkswagen	20h 59' 34"	+ 00' 00"
6	2	M. Miller (USA); R. Pitchford (RSA)	Volkswagen	2h 12' 53"	+ 00' 20"	2	C. Sainz (ESP); M. Perin (FRA)	Volkswagen	21h 07' 13"	+ 07' 39"
6	3	C. Sainz (ESP); M. Perin (FRA)	Volkswagen	2h 16' 03"	+ 03' 30"	3	M. Miller (USA); R. Pitchford (RSA)	Volkswagen	21h 17' 25"	+ 17' 51"
7	1	C. Sainz (ESP); M. Perin (FRA)	Volkswagen	2h 35' 27"	+ 00' 00"	1	C. Sainz (ESP); M. Perin (FRA)	Volkswagen	23h 42' 40"	+ 00' 00"
7	2	M. Miller (USA); R. Pitchford (RSA)	Volkswagen	2h 39' 08"	+ 03' 41"	2	G. De Villiers (RSA); D. von Zitzewitz (GER)	Volkswagen	23h 42' 49"	+ 00' 09"
7	3	R. Gordon (USA); A. Grider (USA)	Hummer	2h 39' 40"	+ 04' 13"	3	M. Miller (USA); R. Pitchford (RSA)	Volkswagen	23h 56' 33"	+ 13' 53"
8	1	C. Sainz (ESP); M. Perin (FRA)	Volkswagen	3h 47' 19"	+ 00' 00"	1	C. Sainz (ESP); M. Perin (FRA)	Volkswagen	27h 29' 59"	+ 00' 00"
8	2	D. Depping (GER); T. Gottschalk (GER)	Volkswagen	3h 51' 21"	+ 04' 02"	2	G. De Villiers (RSA); D. von Zitzewitz (GER)	Volkswagen	27h 40' 56"	+ 10' 57"
8	3	M. Miller (USA); R. Pitchford (RSA)	Volkswagen	3h 51' 31"	+ 04' 12"	3	M. Miller (USA); R. Pitchford (RSA)	Volkswagen	27h 48' 04"	+ 18' 05"
9	1	C. Sainz (ESP); M. Perin (FRA)	Volkswagen	5h 56' 08"	+ 00' 00"	1	C. Sainz (ESP); M. Perin (FRA)	Volkswagen	33h 26' 07"	+ 00' 00"
9	2	M. Miller (USA); R. Pitchford (RSA)	Volkswagen	5h 57' 55"	+ 01' 47"	2	M. Miller (USA); R. Pitchford (RSA)	Volkswagen	33h 45' 59"	+ 19' 52"
9	3	R. Gordon (USA); A. Grider (USA)	Hummer	5h 58' 24"	+ 02' 16"	3	G. De Villiers (RSA); D. von Zitzewitz (GER)	Volkswagen	33h 49' 05"	+ 22' 58"
10	1	C. Sainz (ESP); M. Perin (FRA)	Volkswagen	5h 32' 55"	+ 00' 00"	1	C. Sainz (ESP); M. Perin (FRA)	Volkswagen	38h 59' 02"	+ 00' 00"
10	2	R. Gordon (USA); A. Grider (USA)	Hummer	5h 33' 16"	+ 00' 21"	2	M. Miller (USA); R. Pitchford (RSA)	Volkswagen	39h 26' 33"	+ 27' 31"
10	3	M. Miller (USA); R. Pitchford (RSA)	Hummer	5h 40' 34"	+ 07' 39"	3	G. De Villiers (RSA); D. von Zitzewitz (GER)	Volkswagen	39h 40' 15"	+ 41' 13"
12	1	G. De Villiers (RSA); D. von Zitzewitz (GER)	Volkswagen	4h 06' 43"	+ 00' 00"	1	G. De Villiers (RSA); D. von Zitzewitz (GER)	Volkswagen	43h 46' 58"	+ 00' 00"
12	2	M. Miller (USA); R. Pitchford (RSA)	Volkswagen	4h 23' 00"	+ 16' 17"	2	M. Miller (USA); R. Pitchford (RSA)	Volkswagen	43h 49' 33"	+ 02' 35"
12	3	R. Gordon (USA); A. Grider (USA)	Hummer	4h 32' 10"	+ 25' 27"	3	R. Gordon (USA); A. Grider (USA)	Hummer	45h 05' 50"	+ 1h 18' 52"
13	1	J. Roma (ESP); L. Cruz Senra (ESP)	Mitsubishi	2h 33' 48"	+ 00' 00"	1	G. De Villiers (RSA); D. von Zitzewitz (GER)	Volkswagen	46h 35' 14"	+ 00' 00"
13	2	K. Hołowczyc (POL); J.M. Fortin (BEL)	Nissan	2h 41' 06"	+ 07' 18"	2	M. Miller (USA); R. Pitchford (RSA)	Volkswagen	46h 37' 34"	+ 02' 20"
13	3	G. Chicherit (FRA); M. Baumel (FRA)	BMW	2h 41' 15"	+ 07' 27"	3	R. Gordon (USA); A. Grider (USA)	Hummer	48h 02' 27"	+ 1h 27' 13"
14	1	G. De Villiers (RSA); D. von Zitzewitz (GER)	Volkswagen	1h 35' 43"	+ 00' 00"	1	G. De Villiers (RSA); D. von Zitzewitz (GER)	Volkswagen	48h 10' 57"	+ 00' 00"
14	2	L. Novitskiy (RUS); O. Tyupenkin (RUS)	BMW	1h 35' 45"	+ 00' 02"	2	M. Miller (USA); R. Pitchford (RSA)	Volkswagen	48h 19' 56"	+ 08' 59"
14	3	K. Hołowczyc (POL); J.M. Fortin (BEL)	Nissan	1h 36' 00"	+ 00' 17"	3	R. Gordon (USA); A. Grider (USA)	Hummer	49h 57' 12"	+ 1h 46' 15"

=== Trucks ===
	Stage result					General classification				
Stage	Pos	Competitor	Make	Time	Difference	Pos	Competitor	Make	Time	Difference
1	1	M. Van Vliet (NED); H. Vaanholt (NED); G. Van Veenendaal (NED)	GINAF	3h 15' 07"	+ 00' 00"	1	M. Van Vliet (NED); H. Vaanholt (NED); G. Van Veenendaal (NED)	GINAF	3h 15' 07"	+ 00' 00"
1	2	G. De Rooy (NED); T. Colsoul (BEL); M. Van Melis (NED)	GINAF	3h 15' 09"	+ 00' 02"	2	G. De Rooy (NED); T. Colsoul (BEL); M. Van Melis (NED)	GINAF	3h 15' 09"	+ 00' 02"
1	3	I. Mardeev (RUS); V. Mizykuaev (RUS); A. Mardeev (RUS)	Kamaz	3h 15' 29"	+ 00' 22"	3	I. Mardeev (RUS); V. Mizykuaev (RUS); A. Mardeev (RUS)	Kamaz	3h 15' 29"	+ 00' 22"
2	1	G. De Rooy (NED); T. Colsoul (BEL); M. Van Melis (NED)	GINAF	2h 21' 42"	+ 00' 00"	1	G. De Rooy (NED); T. Colsoul (BEL); M. Van Melis (NED)	GINAF	5h 36' 51"	+ 00' 00"
2	2	F. Kabirov (RUS); A. Belyaev (RUS); A. Mokeev (RUS)	Kamaz	2h 23' 42"	+ 02' 00"	2	F. Kabirov (RUS); A. Belyaev (RUS); A. Mokeev (RUS)	Kamaz	5h 40' 49"	+ 03' 58"
2	3	M. Van Vliet (NED); H. Vaanholt (NED); G. Van Veenendaal (NED)	GINAF	2h 30' 20"	+ 08' 38"	3	M. Van Vliet (NED); H. Vaanholt (NED); G. Van Veenendaal (NED)	GINAF	5h 45' 27"	+ 08' 36"
3	1	V. Chagin (RUS); S. Savostin (RUS); E. Nikolaev (RUS)	Kamaz	5h 15' 59"	+ 00' 00"	1	G. De Rooy (NED); T. Colsoul (BEL); M. Van Melis (NED)	GINAF	10h 56' 14"	+ 00' 00"
3	2	G. De Rooy (NED); T. Colsoul (BEL); M. Van Melis (NED)	GINAF	5h 19' 23"	+ 03' 24"	2	F. Kabirov (RUS); A. Belyaev (RUS); A. Mokeev (RUS)	Kamaz	11h 04' 00"	+ 07' 46"
3	3	F. Kabirov (RUS); Aydar Belyaev (RUS); A. Mokeev (RUS)	Kamaz	5h 23' 11"	+ 07' 12"	3	V. Chagin (RUS); Sergey Savostin (RUS); E. Nikolaev (RUS)	Kamaz	11h 05' 42"	+ 09' 28"
4	1	G. De Rooy (NED); T. Colsoul (BEL); M. Van Melis (NED)	GINAF	4h 20' 27"	+ 00' 00"	1	G. De Rooy (NED); T. Colsoul (BEL); M. Van Melis (NED)	GINAF	15h 16' 41"	+ 00' 00"
4	2	V. Chagin (RUS); S. Savostin (RUS); E. Nikolaev (RUS)	Kamaz	4h 21' 13"	+ 00' 46"	2	V. Chagin (RUS); S. Savostin (RUS); E. Nikolaev (RUS)	Kamaz	15h 26' 55"	+ 10' 14"
4	3	F. Kabirov (RUS); A. Belyaev (RUS); A. Mokeev (RUS)	Kamaz	4h 25' 22"	+ 04' 55"	3	F. Kabirov (RUS); A. Belyaev (RUS); A. Mokeev (RUS)	Kamaz	15h 29' 22"	+ 12' 41"
5	1	F. Kabirov (RUS); A. Belyaev (RUS); A. Mokeev (RUS)	Kamaz	6h 43' 56"	+ 00' 00"	1	G. De Rooy (NED); T. Colsoul (BEL); M. Van Melis (NED)	GINAF	22h 13' 05"	+ 00' 00"
5	2	V. Chagin (RUS); S. Savostin (RUS); E. Nikolaev (RUS)	Kamaz	6h 56' 15"	+ 12' 19"	2	F. Kabirov (RUS); A. Belyaev (RUS); A. Mokeev (RUS)	Kamaz	22h 13' 18"	+ 00' 13"
5	3	G. De Rooy (NED); T. Colsoul (BEL); M. Van Melis (NED)	GINAF	6h 56' 24"	+ 12' 28"	3	V. Chagin (RUS); S. Savostin (RUS); E. Nikolaev (RUS)	Kamaz	22h 23' 10"	+ 10' 05"
6	1	V. Chagin (RUS); S. Savostin (RUS); E. Nikolaev (RUS)	Kamaz	2h 31' 58"	+ 00' 00"	1	F. Kabirov (RUS); A. Belyaev (RUS); A. Mokeev (RUS)	Kamaz	24h 45' 36"	+ 00' 00"
6	2	F. Kabirov (RUS); A. Belyaev (RUS); A. Mokeev (RUS)	Kamaz	2h 32' 18"	+ 00' 20"	2	V. Chagin (RUS); S. Savostin (RUS); E. Nikolaev (RUS)	Kamaz	24h 55' 08"	+ 09' 32"
6	3	G. De Rooy (NED); T. Colsoul (BEL); M. Van Melis (NED)	GINAF	2h 57' 51"	+ 25' 53"	3	G. De Rooy (NED); T. Colsoul (BEL); M. Van Melis (NED)	GINAF	25h 10' 56"	+ 25' 20"
8	1	G. De Rooy (NED); T. Colsoul (BEL); M. Van Melis (NED)	GINAF	2h 47' 33"	+ 00' 00"	1	F. Kabirov (RUS); A. Belyaev (RUS); A. Mokeev (RUS)	Kamaz	27h 40' 43"	+ 00' 00"
8	2	V. Chagin (RUS); S. Savostin (RUS); E. Nikolaev (RUS)	Kamaz	2h 49' 15"	+ 01' 42"	2	V. Chagin (RUS); S. Savostin (RUS); E. Nikolaev (RUS)	Kamaz	27h 44' 23"	+ 03' 40"
8	3	A Loprais (CZE); V. Stajf (CZE); M Holan (CZE)	TATRA	2h 49' 45"	+ 02' 12"	3	G. De Rooy (NED); T. Colsoul (BEL); M. Van Melis (NED)	GINAF	27h 58' 29"	+ 17' 46"
9	1	F. Kabirov (RUS); A. Belyaev (RUS); A. Mokeev (RUS)	Kamaz	7h 04' 04"	+ 00' 00"	1	F. Kabirov (RUS); A. Belyaev (RUS); A. Mokeev (RUS)	Kamaz	34h 42' 47"	+ 00' 00"
9	2	V. Chagin (RUS); S. Savostin (RUS); E. Nikolaev (RUS)	Kamaz	7h 02' 34"	+ 00' 30"	2	V. Chagin (RUS); S. Savostin (RUS); E. Nikolaev (RUS)	Kamaz	34h 46' 57"	+ 04' 10"
9	3	G. De Rooy (NED); T. Colsoul (BEL); M. Van Melis (NED)	GINAF	7h 19' 03"	+ 16' 59"	3	G. De Rooy (NED); T. Colsoul (BEL); M. Van Melis (NED)	GINAF	35h 17' 32"	+ 34' 45"
10	1	V. Chagin (RUS); S. Savostin (RUS); E. Nikolaev (RUS)	Kamaz	5h 14' 40"	+ 00' 00"	1	F. Kabirov (RUS); A. Belyaev (RUS); A. Mokeev (RUS)	Kamaz	40h 01' 23"	+ 00' 00"
10	2	G. De Rooy (NED); T. Colsoul (BEL); M. Van Melis (NED)	GINAF	5h 16' 23"	+ 01' 43"	2	V. Chagin (RUS); S. Savostin (RUS); E. Nikolaev (RUS)	Kamaz	40h 01' 37"	+ 00' 14"
10	3	F. Kabirov (RUS); A. Belyaev (RUS); A. Mokeev (RUS)	Kamaz	5h 18' 36"	+ 03' 56"	3	G. De Rooy (NED); T. Colsoul (BEL); M. Van Melis (NED)	GINAF	40h 33' 55"	+ 32' 32"
12	1	V. Chagin (RUS); S. Savostin (RUS); E. Nikolaev (RUS)	Kamaz	4h 39' 49"	+ 00' 00"	1	V. Chagin (RUS); S. Savostin (RUS); E. Nikolaev (RUS)	Kamaz	44h 41' 26"	+ 00' 00"
12	2	F. Kabirov (RUS); A. Belyaev (RUS); A. Mokeev (RUS)	Kamaz	4h 41' 36"	+ 01' 47"	2	F. Kabirov (RUS); A. Belyaev (RUS); A. Mokeev (RUS)	Kamaz	44h 42' 59"	+ 01' 33"
12	3	G. De Rooy (NED); T. Colsoul (BEL); M. Van Melis (NED)	GINAF	5h 04' 29"	+ 24' 40"	3	G. De Rooy (NED); T. Colsoul (BEL); M. Van Melis (NED)	GINAF	45h 38' 24"	+ 58' 58"
13	1	F. Kabirov (RUS); A. Belyaev (RUS); A. Mokeev (RUS)	Kamaz	3h 01' 51"	+ 00' 00"	1	F. Kabirov (RUS); A. Belyaev (RUS); A. Mokeev (RUS)	Kamaz	47h 44' 50"	+ 00' 00"
13	2	G. De Rooy (NED); T. Colsoul (BEL); M. Van Melis (NED)	GINAF	3h 04' 03"	+ 02' 12"	2	V. Chagin (RUS); S. Savostin (RUS); E. Nikolaev (RUS)	Kamaz	47h 47' 50"	+ 03' 00"
13	3	F. Echter (GER); D. Ruf (GER); A. Klein (GER)	MAN	3h 04' 27"	+ 02' 36"	3	G. De Rooy (NED); T. Colsoul (BEL); M. Van Melis (NED)	GINAF	48h 42' 27"	+ 57' 37"
14	1	F. Kabirov (RUS); A. Belyaev (RUS); A. Mokeev (RUS)	Kamaz	1h 49' 56"	+ 00' 00"	1	F. Kabirov (RUS); A. Belyaev (RUS); A. Mokeev (RUS)	Kamaz	49h 34' 46"	+ 00' 00"
14	2	V. Chagin (RUS); S. Savostin (RUS); E. Nikolaev (RUS)	Kamaz	1h 50' 35"	+ 00' 39"	2	V. Chagin (RUS); S. Savostin (RUS); E. Nikolaev (RUS)	Kamaz	49h 38' 25"	+ 03' 39"
14	3	F. Echter (GER); D. Ruf (GER); A. Klein (GER)	MAN	1h 51' 23"	+ 01' 27"	3	G. De Rooy (NED); T. Colsoul (BEL); M. Van Melis (NED)	GINAF	50h 34' 42"	+ 59' 56"

Trucks did not compete in Stage 7.
The timed part of Stage 11 was cancelled due to bad weather.

== Final standings ==
=== Bikes ===
Pos	No.	Rider	Bike	Entrant	Time
1	2	(Spain) Marc Coma	KTM	Team KTM Repsol	52:14:33
2	1	(France) Cyril Despres	KTM	Team Red Bull KTM	+1:25:38
3	12	(France) David Frétigné	Yamaha	Team Fret Motorsport	+1:38:56
4	3	(France) David Casteu	KTM	Vectra Racing Team	+2:17:54
5	5	(Portugal) Hélder Rodrigues	KTM	Lagos Team	+2:22:11
6	4	(Norway) Pål Anders Ullevålseter	KTM	Team Scandinavia	+2:25:02
7	9	(Spain) Jordi Viladoms	KTM	Team KTM Repsol	+2:28:29
8	15	(Netherlands) Frans Verhoeven	KTM	Vectra Racing Team	+2:50:39
9	11	(Netherlands) Henk Knuiman	KTM	Canon Kamera-Express Rally Team	+3:22:41
10	23	(Portugal) Paulo Gonçalves	Honda		+4:12:42

=== Quads ===
Pos	No.	Rider	Quad	Time
1	250	(Czech Republic) Josef Macháček	Yamaha	68:22:06
2	273	(Argentina) Marcos Patronelli	Can-Am	+2:34:00
3	262	(Poland) Rafał Sonik	Yamaha	+7:42:34
4	255	(France) Hubert Deltrieu	Polaris	+11:13:31
5	272	(Czech Republic) Oldřich Bražina	Yamaha	+15:59:51
6	251	(Spain) Carlos Avendaño	Suzuki	+16:44:15
7	267	(France) Eric Carlini	Polaris	+25:10:45
8	268	(France) Elisabeth Kraft	Polaris	+26:12:39
9	276	(France) Olivier Pottier	Can-Am	+40:20:38
10	252	(Spain) José María Peña	Yamaha	+46:46:05

=== Cars ===
Pos	No.	Driver	Co-Driver	Car	Entrant	Time
1	305	(South Africa) Giniel de Villiers	(Germany) Dirk von Zitzewitz	Volkswagen	Volkswagen Motorsport	48:10:57
2	308	(United States) Mark Miller	(South Africa) Ralph Pitchford	Volkswagen	Volkswagen Motorsport	+8:59
3	309	(United States) Robby Gordon	(United States) Andy Grider	Hummer	Robby Gordon Motorsports	+1:46:15
4	327	(Norway) Ivar Erik Tollefsen	(United Kingdom) Quin Evans	Nissan	Overdrive	+6:04:34
5	317	(Poland) Krzysztof Hołowczyc	(Belgium) Jean-Marc Fortin	Nissan	Overdrive	+6:37:49
6	307	(Germany) Dieter Depping	(Germany) Timo Gottschalk	Volkswagen	Volkswagen Motorsport	+8:43:29
7	340	(Czech Republic) Miroslav Zapletal	(Czech Republic) Tomas Ourednicek	Mitsubishi	Offroadsport.cz	+11:03:08
8	316	(Russia) Leonid Novitskiy	(Russia) Oleg Tyupenkin	BMW	Team X-Raid	+13:15:13
9	306	(France) Guerlain Chicherit	(France) Mathieu Baumel	BMW	Team X-Raid	+14:49:49
10	304	(Spain) Nani Roma	(Spain) Lucas Cruz	Mitsubishi	Repsol Mitsubishi Ralliart	+17:27:46

=== Trucks ===
Pos	No.	Driver	Co-Drivers	Truck	Time
1	506	(Russia) Firdaus Kabirov	(Russia) Aydar Belyaev (Russia) Andrey Mokeev	Kamaz	49:34:46
2	501	(Russia) Vladimir Chagin	(Russia) Sergey Savostin (Russia) Eduard Nikolaev	Kamaz	+3:39
3	505	(Netherlands) Gérard de Rooy	(Belgium) Tom Colsoul (Netherlands) Marcel van Melis	GINAF	+59:56
4	508	(Russia) Ilgizar Mardeev	(Russia) Viatcheslav Mizyukaev (Russia) Ayrat Mardeev	Kamaz	+6:46:30
5	507	(Germany) Franz Echter	(Germany) Detlef Ruf (Germany) Artur Klein	MAN	+7:19:41
6	504	(Brazil) André de Azevedo	(Brazil) Maykel Justo (Czech Republic) Jaromír Martinec	Tatra	+9:31:18
7	510	(Spain) Pep Vila Roca	(Spain) Moisès Torrallardona (Spain) Joaquim Busoms	Mercedes	+16:06:40
8	503	(Netherlands) Wulfert van Ginkel	(Netherlands) Willem Tijsterman (Netherlands) Richard de Rooy	GINAF	+16:29:47
9	514	(Spain) Jordi Juvanteny	(Spain) José Luis Criado (Spain) Fina Román	MAN	+19:53:45
10	534	(Hungary) Zoltán Szaller	(Hungary) Lazlo Karoly Pocsik (Hungary) Tibor Csitari	MAN	+20:27:01

== Accidents ==
During the first stage of the rally, British driver Paul Green and co-driver Matthew Harrison were seriously injured when their Rally Raid UK car overturned.

On 7 January 49-year-old French motorcycle rider Pascal Terry was found dead in a remote area. He had been missing since the second stage of the rally, and the cause of death was determined as a pulmonary edema.

On the tenth stage on 13 January 48-year-old Spanish motorcyclist Cristóbal Guerrero was seriously injured after a heavy crash. 24 hours after the accident, he was reportedly still in a coma and in a critical condition. Guerrero's son Cristóbal junior competes in the World Enduro Championship.

During stage twelve of 15 January, rally leader Carlos Sainz rolled his Volkswagen Touareg into a ravine, ending the race for the Spaniard and his French co-pilot, Michel Perin, who received a shoulder injury during the crash.

== Notable Drivers ==
- (Qatar) Nasser Al-Attiyah
- (Spain) Carlos Sainz
- (South Africa) Giniel De Villiers
- (France) Stéphane Peterhansel
- (France) Luc Alphand
- (Germany) Dieter Depping
- (United States) Robby Gordon
- (Chile) Eliseo Salazar
- (France) Yvan Muller
- (Lithuania) Antanas Juknevičius
- (Netherlands) Tom Coronel
- (Netherlands) Tim Coronel
- (Japan) Ukyo Katayama
- (Japan) Takuma Aoki
- (Poland) Krzysztof Hołowczyc
- (Italy) Miki Biasion
- (Spain) Joan Roma
- (United States) Mark Miller
- (Scotland) Alister McRae
- (Japan) Hiroshi Masuoka
- (Sweden) Eje Elgh

== Winners ==
Spanish rider Marc Coma won his second Dakar Rally in the motorbike class while KTM scored their ninth consecutive win in the event, which also includes the Central Europe Rally in 2008 that KTM had won.

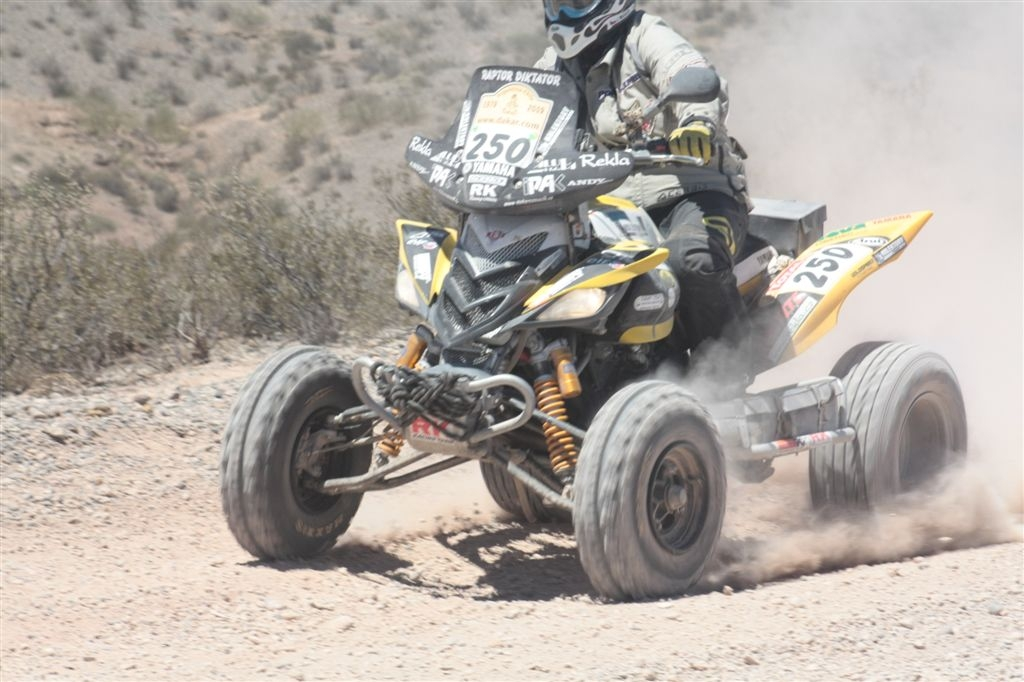
The quad class winner J. Macháček (CZE) driving Yamaha.

Josef Macháček of the Czech Republic won the quad class driving a Yamaha vehicle. It was the first time in Dakar Rally history that the quad category competition was held in a separate class.

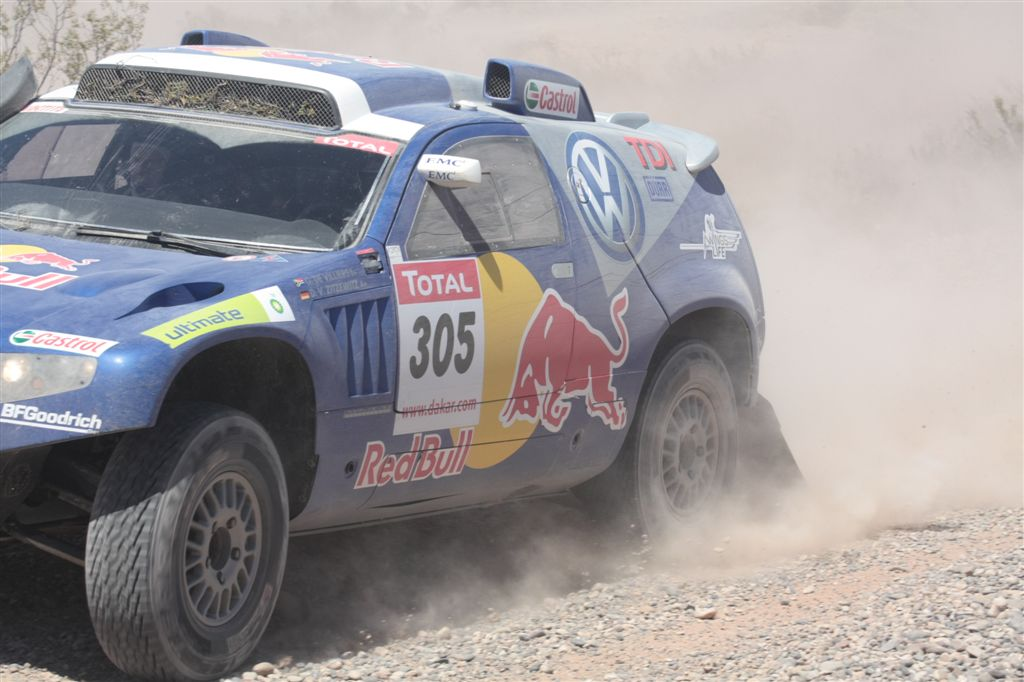
The car category winners G. De Villiers (RSA) and D. von Zitzewitz (GER) in Volkswagen.

Giniel De Villiers of South Africa and his German co-driver Dirk von Zitzewitz won the car category with Volkswagen. It was their first Dakar Rally victory and Volkswagen's second, the first since 1980.

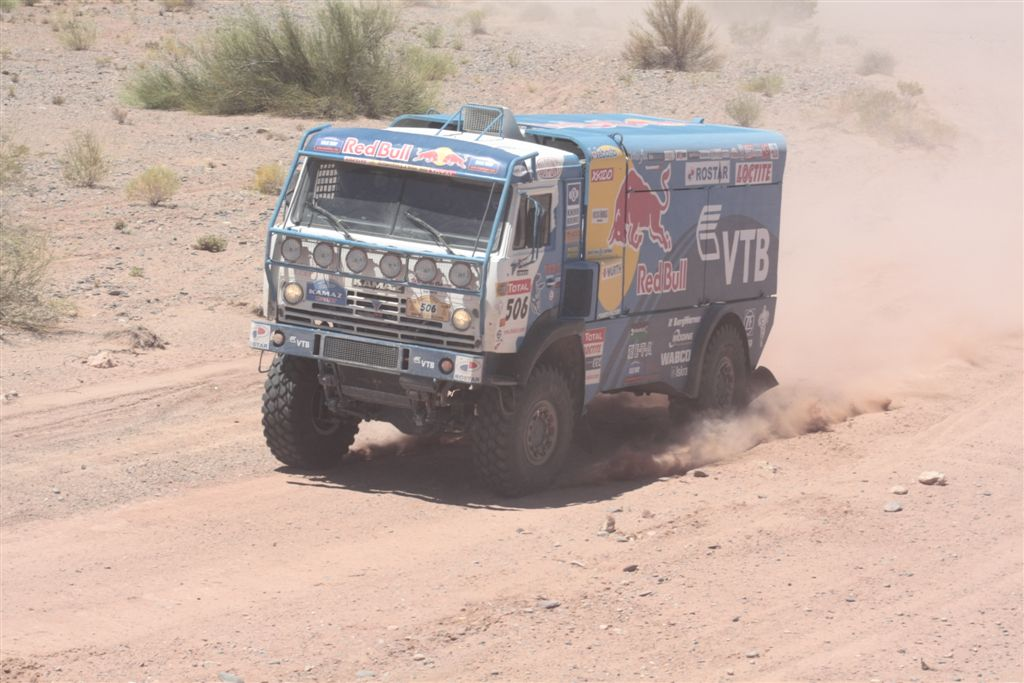
The winning Kamaz truck driven by the crew of F. Kabirov (RUS), A. Belyaev (RUS), and A. Mokeev (RUS).

The Russian Kamaz crew of Firdaus Kabirov, Aydar Belyaev, and Andrey Mokeev won the truck category for their second time with Kamaz scoring their eighth victory and their first since 2006.
