= Education in Costa Rica =

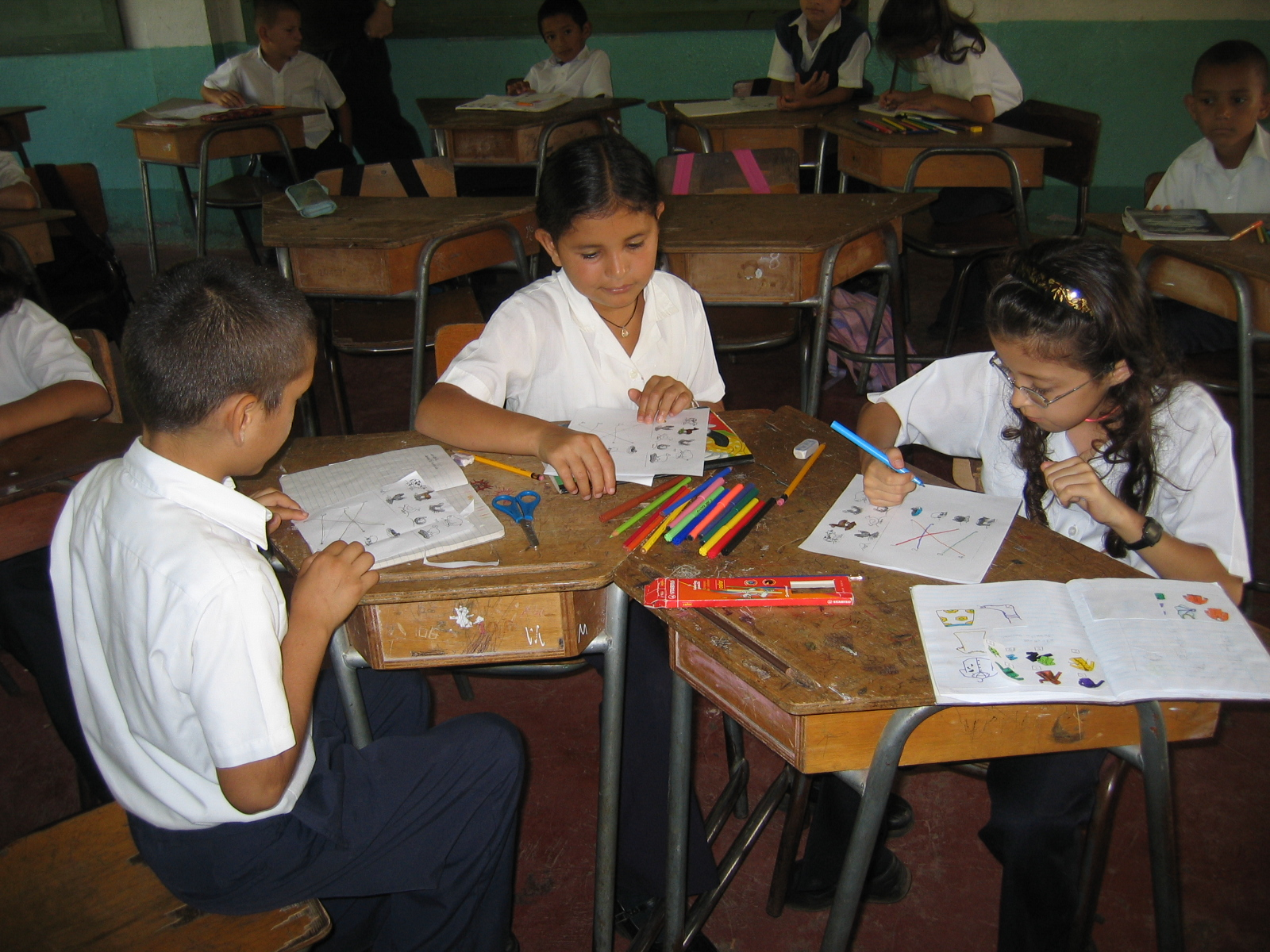
Second graders working in Centro Educativo Linda Vista de Santa Rosa, Guanacaste.

Education in Costa Rica is divided in 3 cycles: pre-education (before age 7), primary education (from 6-7 to 12-13), and secondary school (from 12-13 to 17-18), which leads to higher education. School year starts between the second and third week of February, stops at the last week of June, it continues again between the third and fourth week of July and finishes between the last week of November (private kindergartens, schools and high schools) and the second week of December (public kindergartens, schools and high schools). Preschool and basic education are free to the public. Elementary and secondary school are both divided in two cycles. Since 1869, education is free and compulsory (article 78 of the constitution).

Costa Rica's education system is ranked 54th in the "Global Competitiveness Report 2013–14", and is described as of "high quality". The literacy rate in Costa Rica is 97.9%. It is 2 points over the average for Latin American and Caribbean countries.

The Human Rights Measurement Initiative (HRMI) finds that Costa Rica is fulfilling only 87.4% of what it should be fulfilling for the right to education based on the country's level of income. HRMI breaks down the right to education by looking at the rights to both primary education and secondary education. While taking into consideration Costa Rica's income level, the nation is achieving 91.9% of what should be possible based on its resources (income) for primary education but only 82.9% for secondary education.

== Primary education ==
The primary education lasts six years and is divided in two cycles. The uniform is obligatory, in order to reduce social and economic distinctions.

== Secondary education ==
The secondary education comprises two cycles. The first cycle is dedicated to general education (three years). The second cycle, while keeping a core curriculum, implies a specialization (two years for academic; three years for technical). Specializations can be academic or technical (agricultural, industrial, commercial, secretarial, accounting, crafts, family and social education).

The third cycle ends with the "Bachillerato", granting access to higher Education. Nonetheless, many universities have their own entrance examination.

== Universities ==
There are five public universities in Costa Rica:

- Costa Rica Institute of Technology (TEC)
- Universidad de Costa Rica (UCR)
- Universidad Nacional de Costa Rica (UNA)
- Universidad Estatal a Distancia (UNED)
- National Technical University (UTN)

Public universities offer degree programs according to their specialty and by law, and manage their own central and regional campus. By Costa Rican law, two different public universities may not offer the same degree program.

The public universities publish a number of journals where students and academics can publish their research, and access international research publications freely. Some of these journals are:

- Research Journal/Cuadernos de investigación
- Revista de Biología Tropical

There are also several private universities:

- Texas Tech University - Costa Rica
- Universidad Latinoamericana de Ciencia y Tecnología (Costa Rica)
- Universidad Latina de Costa Rica
- Instituto Centroamericano de Administración de Empresas (INCAE)
- Universidad Adventista de Centroamérica (UNADECA)
- United Nations University for Peace
- Universidad de Ciencias Médicas (UCIMED)
- Universidad de EARTH
- Universidad de Iberoamérica (UNIBE)
- Universidad Católica de Costa Rica
- Universidad Empresarial de Costa Rica (UNEM)
- Universidad Santa Paula
- Universidad Veritas
- Universidad Cristiana del Sur
- Universidad San Juan de la Cruz (SJDLC)
- Universidad Panamericana (UPA)
- Universidad Americana
- Universidad Hispanoamericana
- Universidad Fidélitas
- Universidad Empresarial de Costa Rica (UNEM)
- Universidad Libre de Costa Rica
