= 2010 Costa Rican general election =

- 7 February 2010
- Presidential election
- Registered: 2,822,491
- Turnout: 69.12% (▲3.91pp)
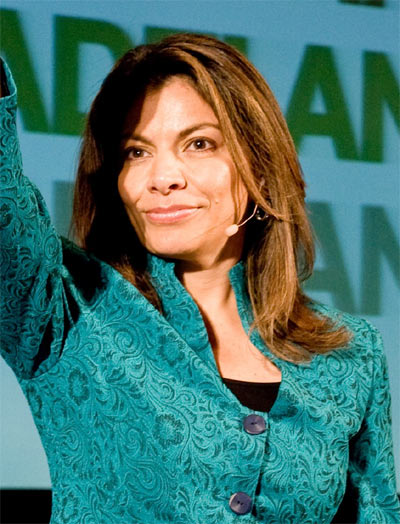

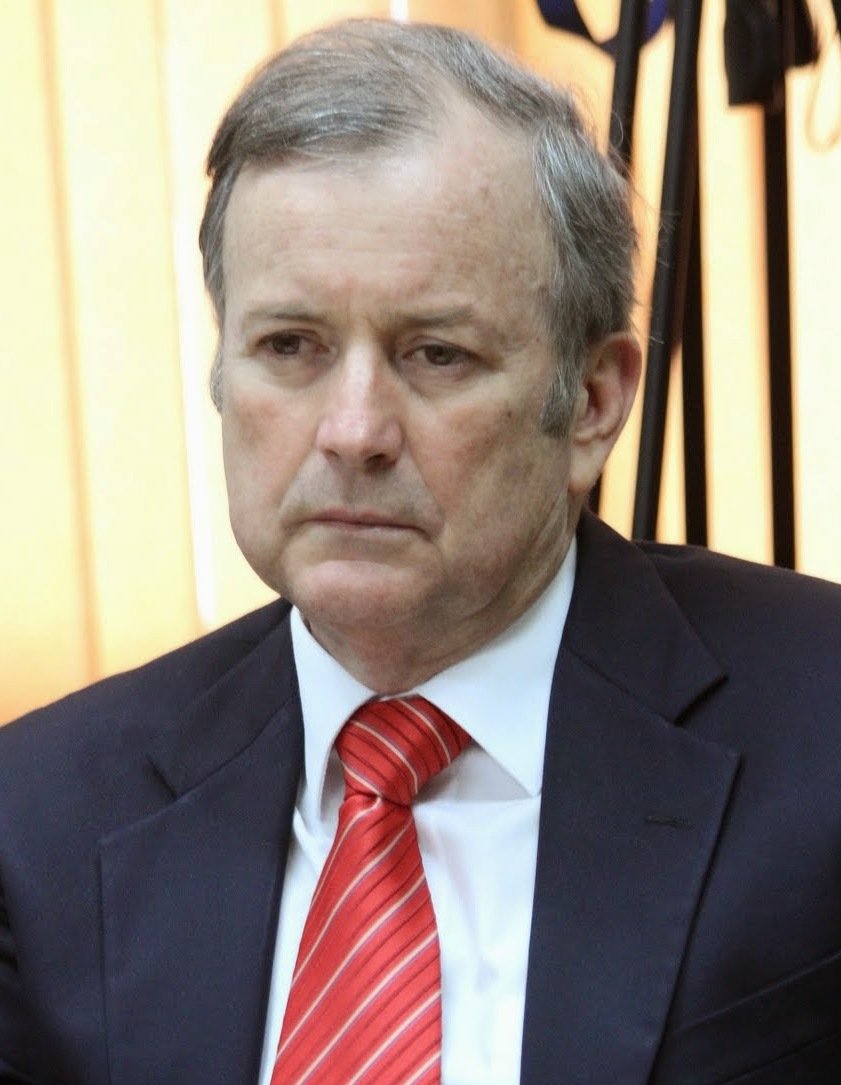

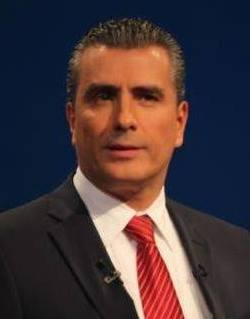
Candidate	Laura Chinchilla	Ottón Solís Fallas	Otto Guevara Guth
Party	PLN	PAC	PML
Running mate	Alfio Piva; Luis Liberman	Mónica Segnini; Julio Humphreys	Mario Quirós; Lorena San Román
Popular vote	896,516	478,877	399,788
Percentage	46.91%	25.05%	20.92%
- Results by district Chinchilla: 30–40% 40–50% 50–60% 60–70% 70-80% 80-90% Solís: 30-40% 40–50% 50-60% Guevara: 30-40% 40–50% 50-60% Tie: 30–40% 50%
President before election
Oscar Arias
PLN
Elected President
Laura Chinchilla
PLN
- Legislative election
- All 57 seats in the Legislative Assembly; 29 seats needed for a majority
- Turnout: 69.11% (▲3.91pp)
Party	Leader	Vote %	Seats	+/–
PLN	Laura Chinchilla Miranda	37.27	24	−1
PAC	Ottón Solís Fallas	17.61	11	−6
PML	Otto Guevara Guth	14.50	9	+3
PASE	Óscar López Arias	9.05	4	+3
PUSC	Luis Fishman Zonzinski	8.16	6	+1
PRC	Mayra González León	3.85	1	+1
FA	Eugenio Trejos Benavides	3.63	1	0
This lists parties that won seats. See the complete results below.
Results by province

General elections were held in Costa Rica on 7 February 2010. The ruling party before the election, the center-left National Liberation Party, put forward former Vice-President Laura Chinchilla as its presidential candidate, while the libertarian, Movimiento Libertario nominated former legislator Otto Guevara. Opinion polls before voting started consistently put Chinchilla as the front-runner, a trend confirmed in the election-night count, which showed her garnering 46.76% of the vote.

The election was supervised by observers from several countries, as well as from the Organization of American States. The incumbent president, Óscar Arias, was ineligible to run for a second consecutive term. This was the last time as of 2019, that the National Liberation Party has gotten more than 30% of the vote, the last time to this date that they have won the presidency, and the last time it has won any province in what is known as the Central Valley (the four provinces in the interior of the country: San José, Alajuela, Heredia and Cartago).

== Presidential candidates ==
Candidates included:

- Laura Chinchilla Miranda (ruling National Liberation Party, vice-president 2006–08)
- Ottón Solís (oppositional Citizens' Action Party, candidate in 2006)
- Otto Guevara (Movimiento Libertario, candidate in 2006)
- Luis Fishman (conservative Social Christian Unity Party, vice-president under Abel Pacheco)

Two weeks before the election, Patriotic Alliance and National Integration Party's candidates, Rolando Araya and Walter Muñoz, stopped their campaigns and endorsed Citizens' Action Party's candidate Otton Solís, in an effort to build a progressive alliance against Laura Chinchilla.

== Parliamentary elections ==
The swifting from a two-party system to a multi-party system was much more evident in this election

For the then three major parties; PLN, PAC and ML the voting for the presidential ballot was superior to the support in the legislative, as for example PLN presidential candidate Laura Chinchilla received 46% of the votes and PLN's legislative ballot only 37%. Similarly PAC's candidate Ottón Solís with 25% presidential against 17% legislative and Otto Guevara with 20% oppose to 14% legislative. Contrary to PUSC whose candidate Luis Fishman received 3% electoral support while his party received 8%.

This was at the time PAC's worst electoral result in its history having the smallest faction in the Parliament and ML's best result with to this date its biggest. PLN only lost one seat. Left-wing Broad Front maintained its only seat in the person of future presidential nominee José María Villalta Florez-Estrada and two Christian parties for the first time had deputies at the same time; Costa Rican Renewal Party and its provincial offshoot National Restoration.

== Opinion polls ==
View source data.
- CID-Gallup 24 January 2010: Chinchilla 43%; Guevara 30%; Solís 15%; Fishman 8%
- Borge & Asociados for Diario Extra opinion poll January 2010: Chinchilla 38.7%; Guevara 18.3%; Solís 9.6%; Fishman 3.7%
- Demoscopía for Al Día January 2010: Chinchilla 45.1%; Guevara 30.1%; Solís 9.5%; Fishman 3.8%
- December 2009: Chinchilla 36.7%; Guevara 16.2%; Solís 8.5%; Fishman 2.2%
- December 2009: Chinchilla 46.6%; Guevara 19.5%; Solís 8.3%; Fishman 4.1%
- October 2009: Chinchilla 53.0%; Guevara 15.7%; Solís 12.3%; Fishman 1.5%

== Results ==
=== President ===
At 9:08 p.m. local time on election day, 7 February second-placed candidate Otton Solis conceded defeat to Laura Chinchilla, who will become Costa Rica's first female president. With approximately 40% of the vote counted, Chinchilla was consistently surpassing the 40% threshold for victory in the first round, leading Solis by 47% to 24%, with third-placed candidate Otto Guevara trailing at 21.5%.

Candidate	Party	Votes	%
Laura Chinchilla	National Liberation Party	896,516	46.91
Ottón Solís	Citizens' Action Party	478,877	25.05
Otto Guevara	Libertarian Movement	399,788	20.92
Luis Fishman Zonzinski	Social Christian Unity Party	74,114	3.88
Óscar López	Accessibility without Exclusion Party	36,104	1.89
Mayra González	Costa Rican Renewal Party	13,945	0.73
Eugenio Trejos	Broad Front	6,782	0.35
Rolando Araya Monge	Patriotic Alliance	3,158	0.17
Walter Muñoz	National Integration Party	2,049	0.11
Total		1,911,333	100.00
Valid votes		1,911,333	97.97
Invalid votes		32,555	1.67
Blank votes		6,959	0.36
Total votes		1,950,847	100.00
Registered voters/turnout		2,822,491	69.12
Source: Election Resources

==== By province ====
Province %	PLN %	PAC %	ML %	PUSC %	PASE %	PRC %	Other %
San José	46.6	28.9	17.6	3.6	2.1	0.6	0.6
Alajuela	45.3	26.5	21.9	3.2	1.8	0.8	0.5
Cartago	49.7	23.5	19.4	4.2	2.1	0.4	0.7
Heredia	46.6	27.6	19.5	3.2	1.8	0.6	0.7
Puntarenas	48.9	17.3	26.7	4.4	1.3	0.8	0.6
Limón	41.6	17.5	31.4	5.0	1.7	1.9	0.9
Guanacaste	51.4	15.9	23.3	6.1	1.6	1.2	0.6
Total	46.8	25.1	20.9	3.9	1.9	0.7	0.8

=== Legislative Assembly ===
Party	Votes	%	Seats	+/–
National Liberation Party	708,043	37.27	24	–1
Citizens' Action Party	334,636	17.61	11	–6
Libertarian Movement	275,518	14.50	9	+3
Accessibility without Exclusion Party	171,858	9.05	4	+3
Social Christian Unity Party	155,047	8.16	6	+1
Costa Rican Renewal Party	73,150	3.85	1	+1
Broad Front	68,987	3.63	1	0
National Restoration Party	29,530	1.55	1	0
Patriotic Alliance	28,349	1.49	0	New
National Integration Party	14,643	0.77	0	0
Cartago Agrarian Union Party	11,862	0.62	0	0
Heredia Restoration Party	7,953	0.42	0	New
Alajuela Restoration Party	7,298	0.38	0	New
Cartaginese Transparency Party	4,590	0.24	0	New
Green Ecologist Party	2,901	0.15	0	New
Elderly Alliance Party	2,724	0.14	0	New
Alajuelan Familiar Force Party	1,609	0.08	0	New
Workers' and Farmers' Movement	1,127	0.06	0	New
Total	1,899,825	100.00	57	0
Valid votes	1,899,825	97.39		
Invalid votes	30,806	1.58		
Blank votes	20,077	1.03		
Total votes	1,950,708	100.00		
Registered voters/turnout	2,822,491	69.11		
Source: Election Resources

==== By constituency ====
Constituency	PLN		PAC		ML		PUSC		PASE		PRC		FA		PREN		AP		Other	
Constituency	%	S	%	S	%	S	%	S	%	S	%	S	%	S	%	S	%	S	%	S
San José	35.5	7	19.0	4	12.3	2	7.4	2	11.1	2	3.0	1	4.7	1	4.3	1	1.1	0	1.6	0
Alajuela	38.2	5	19.9	2	16.5	2	6.5	1	8.5	1	6.5	0	1.3	0	2.0	0	1.9	0	0.8	0
Cartago	38.9	3	17.0	1	13.1	1	7.6	1	7.9	1	2.8	0	2.8	0	-	0	1.2	0	8.5	0
Heredia	37.0	2	19.1	2	13.9	1	7.3	0	8.7	0	2.9	0	4.8	0	4.0	0	1.9	0	0.5	0
Puntarenas	39.7	2	14.3	1	18.6	1	13.8	1	5.1	0	4.3	0	2.2	0	-	0	1.1	0	1.0	0
Limón	33.3	2	12.0	1	20.1	1	10.2	1	5.6	0	8.6	0	7.3	0	-	0	1.2	0	1.8	0
Guanacaste	43.1	3	11.6	0	13.5	1	11.0	0	10.0	0	5.1	0	2.2	0	-	0	3.1	0	0.3	0
Total	37.3	24	17.6	11	14.5	9	8.2	6	9.0	4	3.9	1	3.6	1	2.4	1	1.5	0	2.0	0

=== Municipal Councils ===
The elections of municipal councilors of Costa Rica in 2010 were an electoral process held in parallel with the presidential and legislative elections. In them the 495 tenure aldermen and the 495 alternates that conform the 81 Municipal Councils were chosen.

The Central Canton of San José, the most populous, named 13 aldermen. Desamparados and Alajuela named 11. Others less populated (Puntarenas, Limón, Pococí, Heredia, Cartago, La Unión, San Carlos, Goicoechea, Pérez Zeledón, etc.) named 9. Others even smaller (Tibás, Grecia, Vázquez de Coronado, Montes de Oca, Siquirres, Escazú, Turrialba, etc.) appointed 7 council members. Finally, the smallest (Turrubares, San Mateo, Santa Ana, Mora, Montes de Oro, Talamanca, etc.) named 5.

Party	Votes	%	Seats	+/–
National Liberation Party	700,659	37.05	196	–32
Citizens' Action Party	331,167	17.51	100	–39
Libertarian Movement	255,411	13.51	76	+40
Social Christian Unity Party	174,462	9.22	55	–4
Accessibility without Exclusion Party	143,273	7.58	22	New
Costa Rican Renewal Party	51,302	2.71	10	+6
Broad Front	45,399	2.40	1	+1
Patriotic Alliance	28,738	1.52	3	New
National Restoration Party	24,690	1.31	1	–1
21st Century Curridabat	5,643	0.30	4	+2
Renew Alajuela Party	13,403	0.71	1	New
National Integration Party	10,121	0.54	0	0
Heredia Restoration Party	8,797	0.47	0	New
Escazu's Progressive Yoke	8,145	0.43	2	0
Green Ecologist Party	5,319	0.28	0	0
Sancarlenean Alliance Coalition (FA–AP)	4,895	0.26	1	New
Cartago Agrarian Union Party	9,029	0.48	1	–1
Ramonense League Coalition (FA–AP)	4,662	0.25	1	New
Palmarenean Union Party	4,158	0.22	2	0
Party of the Sun	4,077	0.22	2	0
Fuenteovejuna Civic Party of Tibás	3,655	0.19	1	New
Alajuela Restoration Party	3,414	0.18	0	New
Santo Domingo Advancement Movement	3,398	0.18	1	New
Goicoechea in Action Party	3,348	0.18	1	+1
United Barva Coalition (FA–PASE)	3,017	0.16	1	New
Alajuelense Coalition (FA–AP)	2,980	0.16	1	New
The Bridge and Paths of Mora	2,962	0.16	1	–1
Authentic Labourer of Coronado Party	2,848	0.15	1	0
Ateniense Union Party	2,602	0.14	1	New
Barbarenean Integration Party	2,369	0.13	1	New
Elderly Alliance Party	2,279	0.12	0	New
Unique Abangarean Party	2,229	0.12	2	New
Cantonal Action Independent Siquirres Party	2,116	0.11	1	0
United Montes de Oca Coalition (FA–PH)	2,086	0.11	0	New
Social Active Organization	2,025	0.11	1	New
Independent Belemite Party	2,014	0.11	1	0
Live Buenos Aires Party	1,791	0.09	1	New
Communal Pro-Curri Party	1,718	0.09	0	–1
United Heredia Coalition (FA–PH)	1,403	0.07	0	New
Quepeña Action Party	1,386	0.07	0	–2
Autonomous Oromontan Party	1,170	0.06	1	0
Workers' and Peasants' Movement	1,120	0.06	0	0
Naranjenean Action Party	1,047	0.06	0	New
Alfaro Ruiz Peoples' Coalition (FA–AP)	1,023	0.05	1	New
Tarrazú First Party	991	0.05	0	New
Barbarenean Coalition (FA–AP)	831	0.04	0	New
Ecological Garabito Party	709	0.04	1	0
United Talamanca Party	508	0.03	0	New
Aguirre Labour Organization Party	456	0.02	0	0
Poasenean Patriotic Front Coalition (FA–AP)	345	0.02	0	New
Total	1,891,190	100.00	496	–4
Valid votes	1,891,190	97.17		
Invalid/blank votes	55,066	2.83		
Total votes	1,946,256	100.00		
Registered voters/turnout	2,822,491	68.96		
Source: TSE
