= Carlos Avendaño Calvo =

Costa Rican politician, pastor and theologian (born 1955)

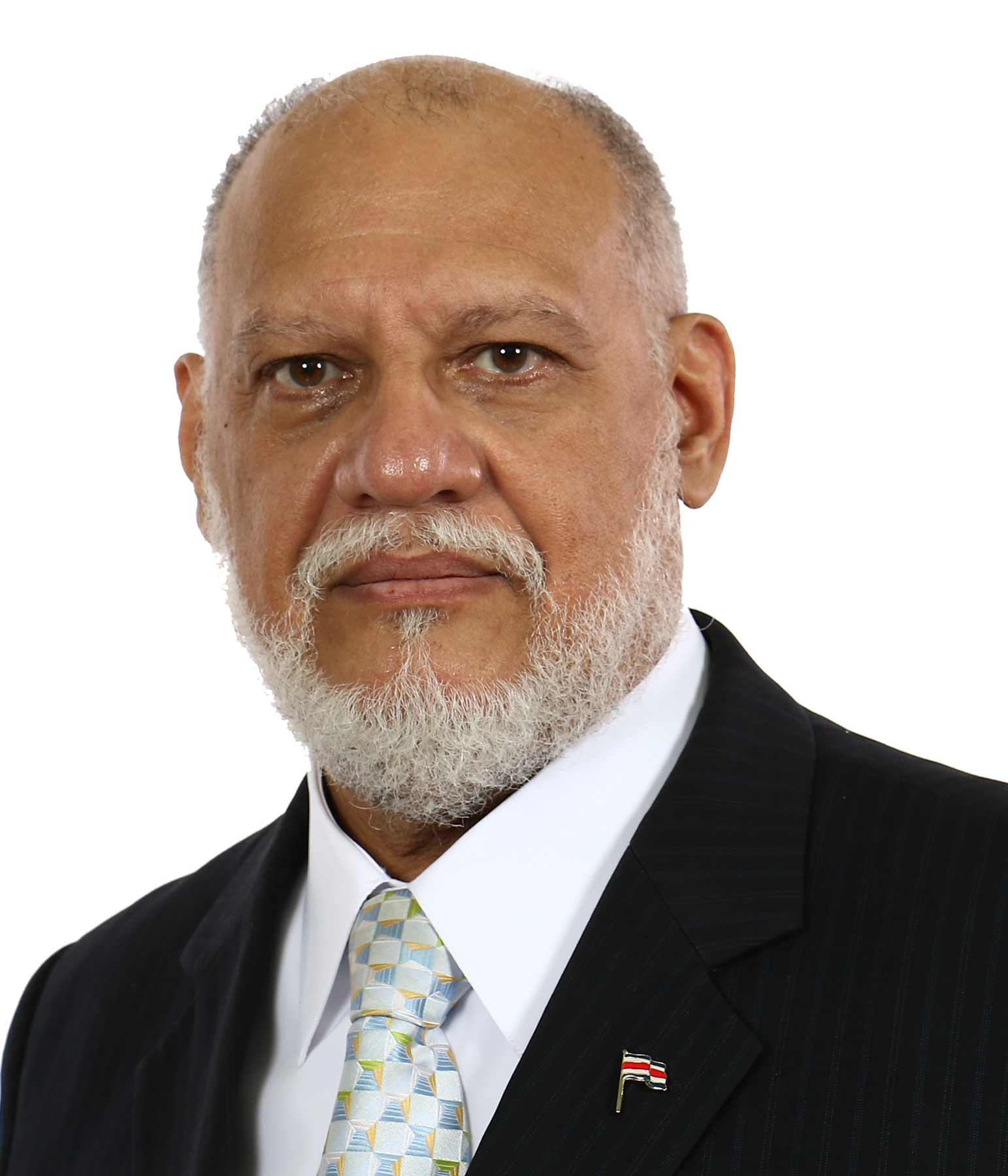
- Official portrait, 2018

Deputy of the Legislative Assembly of Costa Rica
- In office 1 May 2018 – 30 April 2022
- Preceded by: Marvin Atencio Delgado
- Succeeded by: Gilbert Jiménez Siles
- Constituency: San José (5th Office)
- In office 1 May 2010 – 30 April 2014
- Preceded by: José Merino del Río
- Succeeded by: Gonzalo Ramírez Zamora
- Constituency: San José (19th Office)
- In office 1 May 2002 – 30 April 2006
- Preceded by: Walter Muñoz Céspedes
- Succeeded by: José Manuel Echandi Meza
- Constituency: San José (20th Office)

President of the National Restoration Party
- Incumbent
- Assumed office 5 February 2005
- Preceded by: Party established

Personal details
- Born: Carlos Luis Avendaño Calvo; 23 November 1955 (age 70) San José, Costa Rica
- Party: Costa Rican Renewal Party (before 2005); National Restoration Party (2005–present)

Carlos Luis Avendaño Calvo (born 23 November 1955) is a Costa Rican theologian, evangelical pastor and politician who served as a Deputy in the Legislative Assembly from 2018 to 2022. The founder of the National Restoration Party, he previously served from 2002 to 2006 and from 2010 to 2014.

Born San José, Avendaño holds a theological degree form IBAD. Since 1993 Avendaño has been a pastor with the Assemblies of God denomination.

On 5 February 2005 Avendaño founded the National Restoration Party after he resigned as the deputy of Costa Rican Renewal Party because of differences with the parties chairman Justo Orozco. Having already served a term in the Costa Rican assembly representing the Renewal Party, Avendaño was elected to another term in 2010 representing the National Restoration Party. Orozco and Avendaño put their differences aside and the former endorsed that latter for the party's candidate in the Costa Rican presidential election of 2014, as Avendaño received 1.35 percent of the vote.

Avendaño is known for his conservative positions on social issues, such as his opposition to civil unions, same-sex marriage, in vitro fertilization and abortion.
