= Otto Guevara =

Costa Rican politician (born 1960)

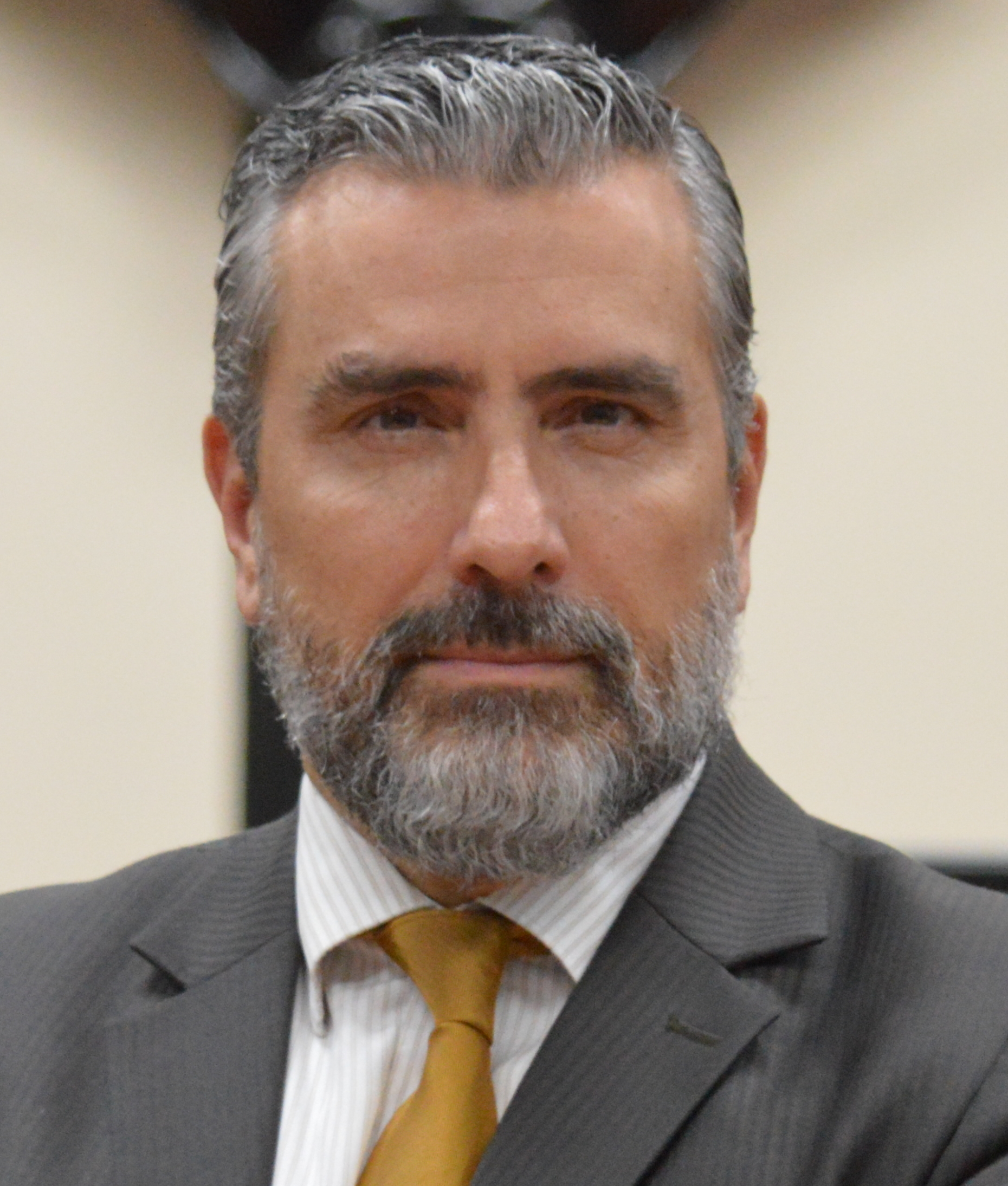
- Guevara in 2018

Deputy of the Legislative Assembly of Costa Rica
- In office 1 May 2014 – 30 April 2018
- Preceded by: Rita Chaves Casanova
- Succeeded by: Shirley Díaz Mejías
- Constituency: San José (15th Office)
- In office 1 May 1998 – 30 April 2002
- Preceded by: Rodrigo Gutiérrez Schwanhauser
- Succeeded by: Ronaldo Alfaro García
- Constituency: San José (19th Office)

President of the Libertarian Movement
- In office 2 December 1994 – 8 June 2013
- Preceded by: Party established
- Succeeded by: Danilo Cubero Corrales

Personal details
- Born: Otto Claudio Guevara Guth; 13 October 1960 (age 65) San José, Costa Rica
- Party: Liberal Union (since 2019)
- Other political affiliations: Libertarian Movement (1994–2019); PUSC (until 1994)
- Spouse(s): Nancy Clark Monge (m. 1990; div. 2004) Virginia Ramos Molina (m. 2020)
- Children: 4
- Education: University of Costa Rica (LLB); National University (MBA); Harvard University (LL.M.)
- Occupation: Lawyer; businessman; politician; professor

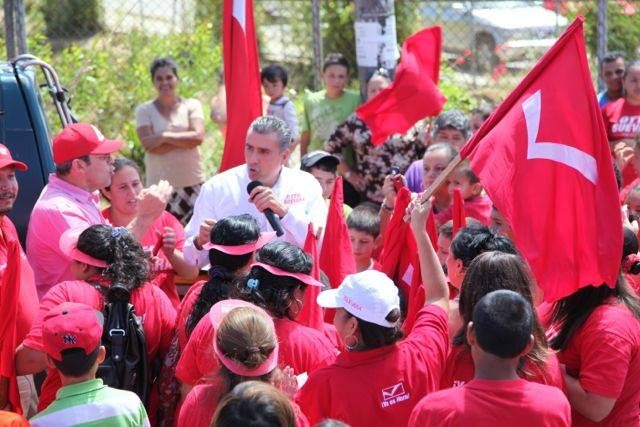
Guevara during a campaign event in February 2014

Otto Claudio Guevara Guth (born 13 October 1960) is a Costa Rican lawyer, businessman and politician who served as a deputy in the Legislative Assembly from 1998 to 2002 and again from 2014 to 2018. He is a co-founder of the Libertarian Movement and was the party's presidential candidate on five occasions between 2002 and 2018.

Guevara has remained active as a columnist and political commentator since leaving public office.

== Personal history ==
Otto Claudio Guevara Guth was born in San José on 13 October 1960, the son of civil servants. His father, Claudio Guevara Barahona, was a physician employed by the Costa Rican Social Security Fund, while his mother, Mariechen Guth Castro, also worked for the institution before leaving public service to help manage the family’s tourism business.

Guevara studied law at the University of Costa Rica, where he obtained a bachelor's degree. He later earned a master's degree in international business from the National University of San Diego and a second master's degree in law with an emphasis on conflict resolution from Harvard University. He subsequently taught at the Faculty of Law of the University of Costa Rica for eight years, specializing in legal education and alternative dispute resolution.

He has served as founder and director of several companies and has worked as an international consultant for the United States Agency for International Development (USAID) and for the Federation of Private Entities of Central America, Panama, and the Dominican Republic (FEDEPRICAP). Guevara has also been a partner and director in companies involved in legal and notarial services, hospitality and adventure tourism, reforestation, agriculture, the concrete aggregate industry, freight transportation, public policy consulting, and real estate development.

In addition to his work as a lawyer, businessman, and academic, he has hosted and produced several television and radio programs promoting his political and economic views.

== Political career ==
Failing to find representation for his political views within Costa Rica’s traditional parties, Guevara co-founded the Libertarian Movement in 1994 alongside Raúl Costales and Rigoberto Stewart. The party sought to challenge what its founders viewed as the prevailing political orthodoxy in Costa Rica, which Guevara argued had led to increasing corruption and insufficient respect for individual rights. Guevara advocated a political program centered on limited state intervention and greater economic freedom, which he argued would improve living standards and promote individual liberty in Costa Rica.

Guevara was first elected to the Legislative Assembly of Costa Rica in 1998 as the sole deputy of the Libertarian Movement. During his first term, he was repeatedly recognized by sections of the Costa Rican press as one of the legislature's most prominent deputies.

In the 2002 general election, Guevara was the Libertarian Movement's presidential candidate and received 1.7% of the presidential vote. The party, however, obtained 9.3% in the legislative election and won six seats in the Legislative Assembly, though one deputy later left the party to serve as an independent. Following internal divisions and the departure of several libertarian members, Guevara stated that the party was evolving toward a broader liberal orientation rather than strict libertarianism.

In the 2006 election, the party again secured six legislative seats, although it later lost another deputy. Guevara received 8.7% of the presidential vote. He was nominated as the party's presidential candidate for a third time in 2009 and, in the 2010 election, finished in third place with 20.9% of the vote.

Guevara ran for president a fourth time in the 2014 election, receiving 11.3% of the vote. The Libertarian Movement won four seats in the Legislative Assembly, including one held by Guevara himself. On election day, a controversy arose after his partner, Deborah Formal, was shown on national television placing part of the Eucharistic host in her pocket during a Catholic Mass.

Guevara later signed the Madrid Charter, a document promoted by the Spanish political party Vox, which characterizes left-wing movements in Ibero-America as part of a coordinated "criminal project" linked to the Cuban government.

In the 2022 general election, Guevara sought to return to the Legislative Assembly as the leading candidate on the Liberal Union list for San José Province. The party received slightly more than 9,000 votes in the province and failed to win a seat, obtaining 24,645 votes nationwide.

In November 2022, Guevara was sentenced to two years in prison for four counts of falsehood in an affidavit. The sentence was later reduced to one year and six months. He did not serve prison time after being granted a suspended sentence for three years. In the same ruling, he was disqualified from holding public office for the same period.
