= 2007 Costa Rican Dominican Republic – Central America Free Trade Agreement referendum =

2007 Costa Rican DR–CAFTA referendum
- 7 October 2007
- Do you approve of the Dominican Republic, Central America-United States Free Trade Agreement?

Results
Choice	Votes	%
Yes	805,658	51.56%
No	756,814	48.44%
Valid votes	1,562,472	99.35%
Invalid or blank votes	10,212	0.65%
Total votes	1,572,684	100.00%
Registered voters/turnout	2,654,627	59.24%

A referendum on the Dominican Republic–Central America Free Trade Agreement (CAFTA) was held in Costa Rica on 7 October 2007. It was originally to be held on 23 September 2007, but it was postponed on 5 June 2007 due to a court challenge. Opinion polls from April, July and August 2007 suggested that a majority of voters were in favour, while a poll from June saw a majority against. It was ultimately approved by 51.56% of voters.

The movement against the CAFTA Referendum in Costa Rica brought many members of the Citizens' Action Party to national politics. Several anti-CAFTA organizers have been elected to the Legislative Assembly.

== Party positions ==
Several parties and organizations held a position against CAFTA. These parties were: Citizens' Action, Broad Front, Social Christian Unity, Accessibility without Exclusion, National Integration, People's Vanguard, National Rescue, Costa Rican Renewal and a sector of National Liberation known as Liberacionistas contra el TLC (Liberationists against CAFTA). Other organizations that endorsed the "No" vote include nearly all trade unions (APSE, ANDE, SEC, ANEP, FIT-ICE, UNDECA, SINDEU), environmentalists (APREFLOFAS, Coecoceiba, FECON), Costa Rica Firefighter Corps, the Lutheran Costa Rican Church, the LGBT Rights movement, and the Cámara de Empresarios Pro-Costa Rica (Pro-Costa Rica Chamber of Commerce). Other organizations against the free trade agreement include the students' federation of all four public universities and their respective rectors; the movement itself (Patriotic Movement Against CAFTA) was directed by Costa Rica Institute of Technology rector Eugenio Trejos^{es}

National Liberation Party, Libertarian Movement, National Union Party, and National Restoration Party were in favor of Costa Rica's entry to CAFTA, as so was the majority of Social Christian Unity's congressmen in that legislature. Almost all commerce chambers that made up the Union of Commerce Chambers and Private Enterprise Associations (UCCAEP) also voiced their support for the "Yes" vote. The official movement was called the Citizens' Alliance for Yes and it was led by one of the government's ministers, Alfredo Volio Escalante.

Position	Political parties	Ideology	Political position
Yes	National Liberation Party	Social Democracy	Centre to Centre-left
Yes	Libertarian Movement	Libertarianism, Neoliberalism	Right-wing
Yes	National Restoration Party	Christian Right	Right-wing
Yes	National Union Party	Liberalism	Centre-right
No
No	Citizens' Action Party	Progressivism	Centre-left
No	Social Christian Unity Party	Christian Democracy	Centre-right
No	Broad Front	Democratic Socialism	Left-wing
No	Accessibility without Exclusion	Disability rights	Centre-right to centre-left
No	People's Vanguard Party	Communism	Far-left
No	Costa Rican Renewal Party	Christian conservatism	Centre-right to centre-left
No	National Integration Party	Syncretic, Conservatism	Right-wing to centre-left

== Results ==
According to the Electoral Supreme Tribunal, the referendum was approved by voters in San Jose, Cartago, Heredia, and Limon provinces. Meanwhile, a majority of voters in Alajuela, Guanacaste and Puntarenas provinces rejected the proposal.

Choice	Votes	%
For	805,658	51.56
Against	756,814	48.44
Total	1,562,472	100.00
Valid votes	1,562,472	99.35
Invalid/blank votes	10,212	0.65
Total votes	1,572,684	100.00
Registered voters/turnout	2,654,627	59.24
Source: Direct Democracy

=== By canton ===
Region	Electorate	Voter turnout, of eligible	Votes		Proportion of votes	
Region	Electorate	Voter turnout, of eligible	For	Against	For	Against
San José Province	966,817	61.69%	308,229	288,195	51.68%	48.32%
San José	224,414	61.19%	75,840	61,490	55.22%	44.78%
Escazú	37,440	67.48%	15,052	10,210	59.58%	40.42%
Desamparados	136,790	60.69%	42,248	40,768	50.89%	49.11%
Puriscal	22,450	59.99%	6,216	7,251	46.16%	53.84%
Tarrazú	9,647	54.79%	2,550	2,678	48.78%	51.22%
Aserrí	34,712	59.20%	9,001	11,548	43.80%	56.20%
Mora	15,626	60.83%	4,819	4,686	50.70%	49.30%
Goicoechea	83,770	62.80%	26,975	25,629	51.28%	48.72%
Santa Ana	24,917	65.45%	9,461	6,846	58.02%	41.98%
Alajuelita	42,193	56.15%	11,978	11,713	50.56%	49.44%
Vázquez de Coronado	41,276	66.93%	14,717	12,909	53.27%	46.73%
Acosta	13,143	60.12%	2,340	5,562	29.61%	70.39%
Tibás	55,642	64.93%	20,218	15,911	55.96%	44.04%
Moravia	37,743	68.24%	14,442	11,315	56.07%	43.93%
Montes de Oca	40,446	70.78%	15,055	13,573	52.59%	47.41%
Turrubares	3,787	61.76%	1,286	1,053	54.98%	45.02%
Dota	4,480	56.79%	961	1,583	37.78%	62.22%
Curridabat	41,983	65.65%	16,273	11,288	59.04%	40.96%
Pérez Zeledón	88,960	52.61%	16,928	29,875	36.17%	63.83%
León Cortés	7,398	56.42%	1,869	2,305	44.78%	55.22%
Alajuela Province	487,734	62.05%	148,044	154,587	48.92%	51.08%
Alajuela	161,455	61.45%	56,515	42,695	56.97%	43.03%
San Ramón	49,052	66.70%	9,195	23,524	28.10%	71.90%
Grecia	46,746	65.88%	17,844	12,951	57.94%	42.06%
San Mateo	3,551	59.81%	1,128	996	53.11%	46.89%
Atenas	16,108	69.26%	4,009	7,148	35.93%	64.07%
Naranjo	25,971	63.62%	8,037	8,487	48.64%	51.36%
Palmares	23,049	71.91%	6,531	10,041	39.41%	60.59%
Poás	16,605	68.80%	7,239	4,185	63.37%	36.63%
Orotina	11,622	54.35%	3,721	2,596	58.90%	41.10%
San Carlos	79,104	59.25%	21,746	25,126	46.39%	53.61%
Zarcero	7,269	72.39%	2,227	3,035	42.32%	57.68%
Valverde Vega	11,754	61.30%	3,729	3,476	51.76%	48.24%
Upala	19,332	45.20%	3,133	5,606	35.85%	64.15%
Los Chiles	8,315	47.32%	1,152	2,783	29.28%	70.72%
Guatuso	7,801	47.32%	1,838	1,938	48.68%	51.32%
Cartago Province	307,819	63.08%	109,644	84,542	56.46%	43.54%
Cartago	98,885	66.86%	38,814	27,297	58.71%	41.29%
Paraíso	36,399	62.19%	12,361	10,275	54.61%	45.39%
La Unión	53,833	62.21%	17,634	15,584	52.66%	47.34%
Jiménez	9,843	65.28%	3,832	2,594	59.63%	40.37%
Turrialba	48,758	55.94%	14,532	12,921	52.62%	47.38%
Alvarado	7,796	59.66%	2,610	2,041	56.12%	43.88%
Oreamuno	27,736	63.59%	9,685	7,591	54.92%	45.08%
El Guarco	24,569	64.98%	10,356	5,609	64.87%	35.13%
Heredia Province	307,819	63.08%	109,644	84,542	56.46%	43.54%
Heredia	79,764	66.67%	29,443	23,733	55.37%	44.63%
Barva	24,782	70.15%	7,839	9,546	45.09%	54.91%
Santo Domingo	28,056	69.57%	10,591	8,928	54.26%	45.74%
Santa Bárbara	20,436	67.17%	6,502	7,218	47.39%	52.61%
San Rafael	27,049	65.67%	8,267	9,495	46.54%	53.46%
San Isidro	11,764	66.35%	4,004	3,802	51.29%	48.71%
Belén	14,547	72.06%	6,859	3,624	65.43%	34.57%
Flores	12,210	71.14%	5,182	3,504	59.66%	40.34%
San Pablo	16,188	69.01%	5,709	5,462	51.11%	48.89%
Sarapiquí	23,403	48.70%	5,228	6,169	45.87%	54.13%
Guanacaste Province	182,208	49.45%	43,051	47,962	47.30%	52.70%
Liberia	33,396	44.35%	6,718	8,094	45.36%	54.64%
Nicoya	33,324	51.86%	7,065	9,698	42.15%	57.85%
Santa Cruz	30,360	47.51%	6,727	7,697	46.64%	53.36%
Bagaces	10,051	52.40%	2,004	3,263	38.05%	61.95%
Carrillo	17,715	46.75%	5,045	3,236	60.92%	39.08%
Cañas	16,097	50.03%	4,138	3,916	51.38%	48.62%
Abangares	10,624	55.76%	2,605	3,319	43.97%	56.03%
Tilarán	12,264	60.62%	3,535	3,900	47.55%	52.45%
Nandayure	6,770	57.50%	2,197	1,696	56.43%	43.57%
La Cruz	8,043	42.78%	1,874	1,567	54.46%	45.54%
Hojancha	4,564	59.57%	1,143	1,576	42.04%	57.96%
Puntarenas Province	241,824	47.01%	55,909	57,774	49.18%	50.82%
Puntarenas	72,060	48.57%	19,378	15,625	55.36%	44.64%
Esparza	16,825	57.88%	5,131	4,607	52.69%	47.31%
Buenos Aires	24,238	48.44%	4,757	6,983	40.52%	59.48%
Montes de Oro	7,999	60.51%	2,311	2,529	47.75%	52.25%
Osa	16,901	42.00%	3,547	3,552	49.96%	50.04%
Quepos	14,895	43.55%	3,323	3,164	51.23%	48.77%
Golfito	22,925	41.76%	4,211	5,363	43.98%	56.02%
Coto Brus	24,953	43.45%	4,150	6,693	38.27%	61.73%
Parrita	8,418	44.39%	2,315	1,422	61.95%	38.05%
Corredores	25,150	44.69%	4,565	6,675	40.61%	59.39%
Garabito	7,460	45.34%	2,221	1,161	65.67%	34.33%
Limón Province	210,026	44.48%	51,157	42,273	54.75%	45.25%
Limón	58,892	41.63%	12,764	11,753	52.06%	47.94%
Pococí	67,001	48.42%	17,154	15,289	52.87%	47.13%
Siquirres	32,141	41.67%	8,984	4,410	67.07%	32.93%
Talamanca	13,722	43.97%	1,784	4,249	29.57%	70.43%
Matina	17,051	44.52%	5,017	2,574	66.09%	33.91%
Guácimo	21,219	44.54%	5,454	3,998	57.70%	42.30%
Source: TSE
