= National Restoration Party (Costa Rica) =

National Restoration Party Partido Restauración Nacional
- Abbreviation: PRN; PREN
- President: Carlos Avendaño Calvo
- Secretary-General: Mónica Catalán Marín
- Founder: Carlos Avendaño Calvo
- Founded: 5 February 2005
- Split from: Costa Rican Renewal Party
- Ideology: Conservatism; Christian right Social conservatism
- Political position: Right-wing
- Religion: Evangelical Christianity
- Colours: Blue; Yellow
- Declared inactive: 23 October 2023

Party flag

Website
- restauracion.cr

The National Restoration Party (Spanish: Partido Restauración Nacional, PRN or PREN) is a political party in Costa Rica. It was founded in 2005 by Carlos Avendaño Calvo mostly by dissidents of Costa Rica's historical Christian party, Costa Rican Renewal, after its then only deputy, Carlos Avendaño Calvo, left. Avendaño would successfully return to Congress because of the party from 2010 to 2014. Even though he had personal differences with Justo Orozco (then the PRC's only deputy), both were able to work together in defending the same agenda, mainly the conservative views of the evangelical community. The party's candidate in the presidential election of 2014 was Avendaño, who received 1.35 percent of the vote.

In the same year's parliamentary election, Gerardo Fabricio Alvarado Muñoz, representing San José, was elected to the only seat in the Legislative Assembly that was won by the party.

In the 2018 Costa Rican general elections, the party won 14 of the parliament seats and its presidential candidate, Fabricio Alvarado, went in to the runoff. According to the BBC, his campaign gained in popularity because of his opposition to same-sex marriage. The party also holds anti-immigration positions and calls for closed borders and harsher controls on migrants.

== Controversies ==
In March 2018, the newspaper Semanario Universidad reported that high figures of the party had billed several million colones for professional services for participating in their own campaign such as the beneficiaries' own candidate, Fabricio Alvarado, his wife, his brothers, his two vice-presidential nominees, two sons, and the ex-wife of the party president, Carlos Avendaño. It was later discovered that one of the beneficiaries, the son of Avendaño, had received professional services for working for the party while he was incapacitated by health from his official work at the Costa Rican Institute of Electricity. In May 2018, it was reported that the party had hired the polling company OPol, according to financial reports submitted to the Supreme Electoral Tribunal. Although party officials originally reported that they were political consultancies unrelated to the polls, subsequent investigations by the newspaper La Nación discovered a contract for the payment of the six surveys that were conducted during the second round campaign, five of which were published and all of which Alvarado appeared as frontrunner by a large margin. Previously, the pollster had already been in controversy after it was reported on social networks that a company vehicle driven by director Mauricio Muñoz, had carried party flags.

In late May, Avendaño himself filed a complaint with the Supreme Electoral Tribunal for what he called a "parallel structure" made up of the campaign team of the candidate for hiring outside the ethical controls stipulated by the party that would have been the one that negotiated those and other payments.

== Electoral performance ==
=== Presidential ===
| Election | Candidate | First round | | | | Second round | | | |
| Election | Candidate | Votes | % | Position | Result | Votes | % | Position | Result |
|---|---|---|---|---|---|---|---|---|---|
| 2014 | Carlos Avendaño | 27,691 | 1.35% | 7th | Lost | —N/a | | | |
| 2018 | Fabricio Alvarado | 505,214 | 24.91% | ▲1st | ─ | 822,997 | 39.21% | 2nd | Lost |
| 2022 | Eduardo Cruickshank | 11,160 | 0.53% | ▼15th | Lost | —N/a | | | |

=== Parliamentary ===
| Election | Leader | Votes | % | Seats | +/– | Position | Government |
|---|---|---|---|---|---|---|---|
| 2006 | N/A | 32,909 | 2.0% | 1 / 57 | New | 8th | Opposition |
| 2010 | N/A | 29,530 | 1.6% | 1 / 57 | 0 | 8th | Opposition |
| 2014 | Carlos Avendaño | 84,265 | 4.11% | 1 / 57 | 0 | ▲6th | Opposition |
| 2018 | Fabricio Alvarado | 356,082 | 18.11% | 14 / 57 | ▲13 | ▲2nd | Opposition |
| 2022 | Eduardo Cruickshank | 42,495 | 2.05% | 0 / 57 | ▼14 | ▼8th | Extra-parliamentary |

== See also ==
- Evangelical political parties in Latin America
