= Universidad Cristiana del Sur =

- Other names: South Christina University
- Established: 1997
- Location: San José, Costa Rica, Costa Rica
- Website: www.educacion.ac.cr

Universidad Cristiana del Sur (Southern Christian University) is a university in San José, Costa Rica. It offers Associate, Bachelor and Licentiate degrees under Ministry of Education accreditation and some other programs via articulation agreements.

Founded in 1997 the university offers on-campus instruction in English, and Spanish.

== Accreditation ==
The university is accredited by the Costa Rican Ministry of Education, and the Adult Council on Higher Education Private Universities (CONESUP) to award bachelor's degrees, which is equivalent to Regional Accreditation from the United States. The United States Department of Education finds that CONESUP has similar accreditation standards (NCFMEA).

The webpage of the Ministry of Education has a list with the accredited private universities in the country, which are accredited by the National Superior Education Committee, Consejo Nacional de Educación Superior. Universidad Cristiana del Sur appears on that list, however only Bachelor's and Licenciate degrees appear there in the areas of law, business administration, and theology. The university does not offer programs above Licentiate (Master's degrees) under its own accreditation but does have articulation agreements with other universities.
