= Justo Orozco =

Costa Rican politician and lawyer (born 1950)

Justo Orozco Álvarez
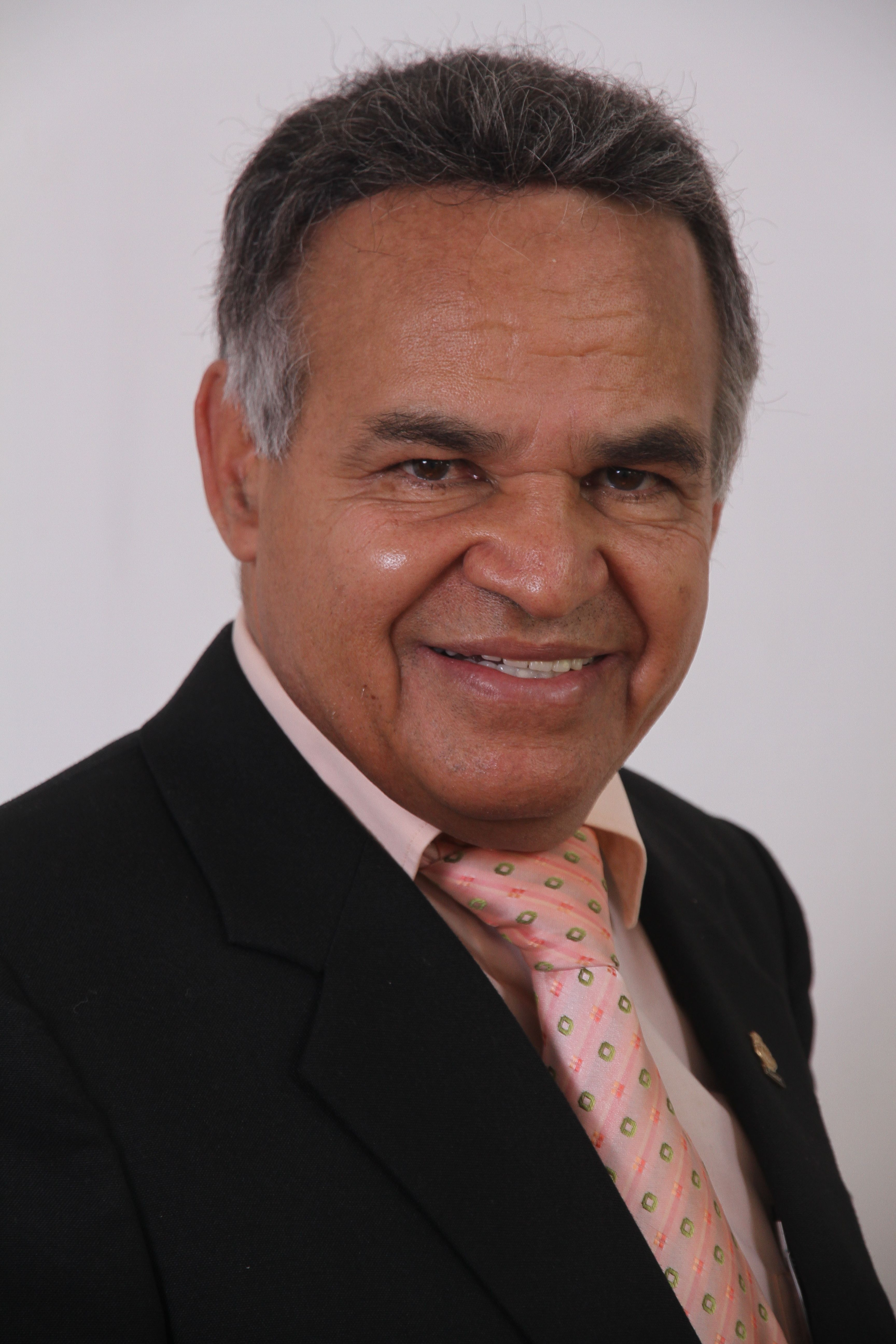
- Orozco in 2013

Deputy of the Legislative Assembly of Costa Rica
- In office 1 May 2010 – 30 April 2014
- Preceded by: José Manuel Echandi Meza
- Succeeded by: Seat abolished
- Constituency: San José (20th Office)
- In office 1 May 1998 – 30 April 2002
- Preceded by: Óscar Ureña Ureña
- Succeeded by: Seat abolished
- Constituency: San José (21st Office)

President of the Costa Rican Renewal Party
- In office 3 June 1995 – 26 May 2017
- Preceded by: Party established
- Succeeded by: Gonzalo Ramírez Zamora

Personal details
- Born: Gerardo Justo Orozco Álvarez; 18 February 1950 (age 76) San José, Costa Rica
- Party: PRC (1995–2017)
- Spouse: Yasmin Mata Blanco (m. 1979)
- Education: Universidad Cristiana del Sur (LLB)
- Occupation: Lawyer; politician; pastor; academic administrator

Gerardo Justo Orozco Álvarez (born 18 February 1950) is a Costa Rican lawyer, evangelical pastor and retired politician who served as a deputy in the Legislative Assembly from 1998 to 2002, and again from 2010 to 2014. He was the founder of Costa Rican Renewal Party, a Christian-based, conservative political party.

Orozco was born in San José, Costa Rica on February 18, 1950. He's married to Yasmín Mata and has two children. Founder member of the Universidad Cristiana del Sur, a private university in Costa Rica, where he received his law degree.

As a congressman, Orozco was heavily opposed all initiatives for same-sex marriage and civil unions and was accused of homophobia, especially after verbally confronting then-Congresswoman and future minister Carmen Muñoz, who is openly lesbian, accusing her of legislating in self-benefit. He also made several public comments that were considered offensive toward the gay community.

== Corruption scandal ==
In 2013 Orozco’s Southern Christian University was raided by judicial authorities pending investigation on charges of degree falsification and alleged exchange of sexual favors among students and teachers for grades. Costa Rica’s board of superior education CONESUP also opened an investigation over degrees and grades irregularities.

== Arrest for sexual abuse charges ==
Orozco was arrested in 2015 after three women accused him of sexual abuse. Allegedly after introduce them in different occasions in motel rooms under false premises. The alleged victims refuse to settle out of court. His Trial is currently pending.
