= Costa Rican Renewal Party =

Christian political party in Costa Rica

Costa Rican Renewal Party Partido Renovación Costarricense
- President: Vacant
- Secretary-General: Vacant
- Founder: Justo Orozco
- Founded: 3 June 1995; 31 years ago
- Dissolved: 27 August 2021; 4 years ago (de facto)
- Split from: National Christian Alliance
- Ideology: Social conservatism Integralism; Formerly: Christian socialism
- Political position: Social: Right-wing; Economic: Centre-left to left-wing (until 2018); Right-wing (from 2018)
- Religion: Evangelical Christianity
- Colours: Blue and White
- Declared inactive: 13 October 2023

Party flag

Website
- http://www.renovacionprc.com/

The Costa Rican Renewal Party (Spanish: Partido Renovación Costarricense) was a Costa Rican Christian political party founded in 1995 by pastor and politician Justo Orozco. Ideologically aligned with the right wing, the party was associated with evangelical Christian conservatism and became one of the country’s earliest politically significant evangelical parties.

The party participated in several national and local elections, primarily advocating socially conservative positions on issues such as abortion, same-sex relationships, and secularism. It maintained a modest but recurring presence in the Legislative Assembly during the late 1990s and 2000s, particularly through alliances and support among evangelical voters.

By 2021, the Supreme Electoral Court registered the party as inactive after seven of the fourteen members of its senior executive committee, including its president Gonzalo Ramírez and secretary-general Sigrid Umaña, had resigned from their positions between 22 May 2019 and 27 August 2021, which left the party without the minimum organizational structure required by law. The party did not participate in the 2022, 2024 or 2026 elections.

== History ==
The party was established in 1995 as a splinter group of the National Christian Alliance (ANC). It first participated in national elections in 1998, when its presidential candidate, Sherman Thomas Jackson, received 1.4% of the vote, while the party won one seat in the Legislative Assembly, occupied by pastor and lawyer Justo Orozco. During the 1999–2000 protests against the proposed electricity and telecommunications liberalization package known as the Combo ICE, Orozco supported the demonstrations and voted against the bill in Congress.

Orozco was the party's presidential candidate in the 2002 general election, finishing fifth with 1.1% of the vote. The party retained its single legislative seat, won by Carlos Avendaño Calvo. Avendaño later left the party and founded the National Restoration Party in 2005.

In the 2006 election, the party nominated Bolívar Serrano Hidalgo for president. He won 3.4% of the vote, though the party lost its legislative representation, which passed to Avendaño's party. During this period, journalist David Romero Mora, known for the book El caso Chemise, publicly endorsed the party. The party opposed the CAFTA-DR during the 2007 referendum on the agreement.

In the 2010 election, former Tibás mayor Mayra González finished sixth in the presidential race with 0.7% of the vote. Despite this result, the party regained representation in the Legislative Assembly with the election of Justo Orozco. Orozco became a controversial figure during his term due to public statements widely criticized as homophobic and because of his election as president of the Legislative Assembly's Human Rights Commission with support from the governing National Liberation Party (PLN).

Orozco again ran for president in 2014, obtaining around 1% of the vote. The party nevertheless increased its congressional representation to two seats, won by lawyer Gonzalo Ramírez Zamora and pastor Abelino Esquivel Quesada. Ramírez was later elected president of the Legislative Assembly for the 2017-2018 term with support from sectors of the PLN, and was eventually re-elected to Congress through the Sovereign People's Party in 2026.

During the mandatory party reorganization process ahead of the 2018 election, internal divisions emerged between supporters and opponents of Orozco. The faction opposed to Orozco, led by Ramírez and Esquivel, prevailed in the internal restructuring process. Orozco and his supporters subsequently left the party and did not join another political organization for that election cycle. Ramírez's faction, generally regarded as closer to the PLN, assumed control of the party and later sidelined Esquivel's faction from party leadership and candidate selection. With both the Orozco and Esquivel factions excluded, journalist Stephanie Campos became the party's presidential candidate, while former PLN deputy Daniel Gallardo Monge headed its legislative ticket. The party obtained poor electoral results and failed to retain representation in the Legislative Assembly.

The party was characterized by socially conservative positions associated with Costa Rica's evangelical Christian minority. It opposed abortion, same-sex marriage, marijuana legalization, and violent video games.

== Electoral performance ==
=== Presidential ===
Election	Candidate	First round				Second round			
Election	Candidate	Votes	%	Position	Result	Votes	%	Position	Result
1998	Sherman Thomas Jackson	19,313	1.39%	6th	Lost	—N/a			
2002	Justo Orozco Álvarez	16,404	1.07%	▲5th	Lost	—N/a			
2006	Bolívar Serrano Hidalgo	15,539	0.96%	▼8th	Lost	—N/a			
2010	Mayra González León	13,945	0.73%	▲6th	Lost	—N/a			
2014	Justo Orozco Álvarez	16,721	0.81%	▼8th	Lost	—N/a			
2018	Stephanie Campos Arrieta	12,309	0.57%	▼11th	Lost	—N/a			

=== Parliamentary ===
Election	Leader	Votes	%	Seats	+/–	Position	Government
1998	Justo Orozco Álvarez	27,892	1.55%	1 / 57	New	6th	Opposition
2002	Justo Orozco Álvarez	54,699	3.59%	1 / 57	0	5th	Opposition
2006	Justo Orozco Álvarez	55,798	3.46%	0 / 57	▼1	5th	Extra-parliamentary
2010	Justo Orozco Álvarez	73,150	3.85%	1 / 57	▲1	▼6th	Opposition
2014	Justo Orozco Álvarez	83,083	4.06%	2 / 57	▲1	▼7th	Opposition
2018	Gonzalo Ramírez Zamora	41,806	1.96%	0 / 57	▼2	▼12th	Extra-parliamentary

== See also ==
- Evangelical political parties in Latin America
