= Opinion polling for the 2022 Costa Rican general election =

In the run up to the Costa Rican general election scheduled to take place in 2022, various organisations carry out opinion polling to gauge voting intention in the country. Results of such polls are displayed in this article. The date range for these opinion polls are from the previous general election, held in 2018, to the present day.

== Presidential election ==
=== First round ===
==== Table of values ====
First position in poll
Second position in poll

Fieldwork dates	Polling firm	PASE López	PAC Ramos	ADC Rivera	CRJ Araya	PEN Campos	FA Villalta	PFN Moya	PIN Muñoz	JSC Quesada	PLN Figueres	PLP Feinzaig	ML Cordero	MSDC Jiménez	PNP Piza	PNG Mena	PNR Alvarado	PSD Chaves	PU Chinchilla	PRSC Hernández	PRN Cruickshank	PT Vega	PUSC Saborío	UP Díaz	PUCD Morales	UL Malavassi	Blank, null, others, undecided
1-2 Feb 2022	OPol	1.00	0.60	0.20	1.10	0.10	4.20	0.60	0.20	0.30	18.70	4.10	0.10	0.00	0.20	0.40	16.90	7.30	0.10	0.50	0.80	0.10	14.90	0.60	0.20	0.20	26.70
29 Jan-1 Feb 2022	Demoscopia		0.60		1.30		6.60				20.20	5.00					8.00	11.80					11.00				35.30
27 Jan-1 Feb 2022	CIEP-UCR	0.20	1.00	0.20	1.10	0.00	7.60	0.20		0.00	17.00	5.70	0.10		0.20	0.00	10.30	8.20		0.40	0.20	0.10	12.90	0.40	0.00	0.20	2.30
25-27 Jan 2022	OPol	1.10	0.70	0.20	1.60	0.20	4.40	0.60	0.10	0.30	18.90	3.40	0.00	0.00	0.10	0.40	18.30	7.20	0.10	0.70	1.10	0.10	15.30	0.80	0.20	0.30	23.90
19-20 Jan 2022	CIEP-UCR	0.10	0.30	0.30	0.70	0.30	7.60	0.20		0.00	15.00	2.50	0.10		0.10	0.10	10.60	5.80		0.10	0.30	0.10	13.70	0.10	0.10	0.00	42.00
7-20 Jan 2022	Ulatina						7.20				20.20	3.30					10.80	11.40					16.50				
14-18 Jan 2022	Enfoques		1.00		3.00		7.00	2.00			17.00	2.00			2.00		20.00	5.00		1.00	1.00		19.00	2.00			18.00
12-14 Jan 2022	CIEP-UCR	0.00	0.60	0.00	1.50	0.00	5.90	0.20		0.00	16.80	0.80	0.00		0.00	0.00	8.50	5.40		0.10	0.50		13.10	0.40	0.00	0.10	46.90
Jan 2022	Índice S.A.				2.00		8.00				23.00						23.00	3.00					22.00				19.00
12-14 Jan 2022	OPol	0.90	1.10	0.20	1.90	0.30	4.90	1.30	0.20	0.40	18.20	1.10	0.20	0.00	0.50	0.30	18.10	4.50	0.10	1.10	1.00	0.10	15.80	0.90	0.50	0.20	26.50
10-14 Jan 2022	Demoscopia		1.00		1.20		5.80	1.20			19.80	1.60					11.90	11.00					15.40				31.10
3-8 Jan 2022	IDESPO-UNA		0.50	0.10	0.60		3.80	0.20		0.10	14.90	1.00			0.20	0.10	11.10	3.30	0.10	0.30	0.10		13.30			0.20	50.50
16-19 Dec 2021	OPol	0.70	0.94	0.27	2.77	0.23	3.48	1.04	0.10	0.17	15.95	0.94	0.17	0.10	0.80	0.13	14.48	3.51	0.10	0.77	0.74	0.03	14.14	0.94	0.60	0.23	36.68
6-10 Dec 2021	CIEP-UCR	0.10	0.50		1.20	0.10	6.80	0.40			17.20	1.70	0.10		0.20	0.20	6.90	6.20		0.30	0.30		15.10	0.10		0.30	42.30
3-9 Dec 2021	Enfoques		1.20		2.20		10.00	4.00			17.00	2.20					13.00	4.00					16.00				52.00
3-7 Dec 2021	Demoscopia						7.30				18.20						13.30	9.00					16.50				30.20
1-20 Nov 2021	IDESPO-UNA	0.10	0.90	0.10	2.80		3.80	0.20	0.10	0.10	18.80	1.00	0.10		0.10	0.10	6.80	3.20	0.10		0.30		7.50	0.10	0.10		2.10
17-19 Nov 2021	CIEP-UCR		1.00		1.00		6.00	0.30		0.20	13.00	1.00			0.00		4.00	4.00		0.60	0.40		10.00	0.00	0.20	0.20	58.00
3-10 Nov 2021	Demoscopia		2.00		4.20		9.40				22.00	2.60					9.20	4.20					10.20				33.20
21 Oct-2 Nov 2021	CIEP-UCR		2.00	0.20	2.00		4.00	0.60			19.00	1.00	0.20		0.00	0.50	5.00	3.00		0.70	0.50		8.00	0.20		0.70	51.00
28 Sep-1 Oct 2021	OPol		0.90		15.30		3.90	2.00			16.20	0.70			1.90		18.30	2.50		1.90			10.30	0.60			22.80
17-24 Sep 2021	Demoscopia		6.70		4.40		4.40				26.80	1.80					7.10	2.50					7.50				38.00
1-4 Sep 2021	OPol		1.00		13.30		5.00				18.30	0.00			2.10	0.00	19.10	2.10		2.30	0.00		11.00	1.50		0.00	20.40
23-27 Aug 2021	CIEP-UCR		4.00		2.00		2.00	1.00			17.00	1.00	0.30		0.30	0.30	4.00	2.00		0.30	0.30		6.00			0.30	57.00
31 Jul-2 Aug 2021	OPol		0.43		18.70		8.80				17.90	0.20			2.10	0.90	20.00			6.20	1.30		13.80	2.80		1.60	
28-31 Jul 2021	Demoscopia		8.80		3.80		11.60				22.20						11.60						14.00				
10-15 Jul 2021	Enfoques				10.00		8.00				11.00	1.00			5.00		14.00	2.00					13.00				1.00
1-4 Jul 2021	OPol				10.10		12.20				15.30				1.00	0.10	16.10	1.20			0.10		0.10				
Jun 2021	Enfoques						7.00				16.00	1.00			4.00		14.00	2.00					5.00			2.00	3.00
May 2021	Enfoques				8.00		9.00				14.00	0.00			5.00		13.00	1.00					5.00				2.00
Apr 2021	Enfoques				13.00		10.00				15.00	1.00			6.00		17.00	1.00					7.00				3.00
10-13 Mar 2021	OPol		1.50		16.50		9.70				12.70	1.70				1.80	23.00				2.10		5.10	2.40			

=== Second round ===
==== Table of values ====
First position in poll

Fieldwork dates	Polling firm	PSD Chaves	PLN Figueres	Blank, null, undecided.
8-11 February 2022	OPol	49,5%	33,1%	17,4%
14-19 February 2022	IDESPO-UNA	45.6%	32.5%	18%
22-24 February 2022	CIEP-UCR	42.7%	30.3%	20%
25 February-1 March 2022	Enfoques	45.6%	32.5%	18%
26 February-2 March 2022	Demoscopía	39.9%	37.1%	11.9%
28 February-4 March 2022	IDESPO-UNA	44.4%	32.5%	16.2%
3-5 March 2022	Opol	49.5%	30.6%	19.9%
8-12 March 2022	Enfoques	52%	30.9%	14.5%
15-16 March 2022	Demoscopia	38%	40%	11%
14-18 March 2022	Opol	39.6%	31%	
14-19 March 2022	IDESPO-UNA	41.2%	33.3%	18.8%
18-21 March 2022	CIEP-UCR	43.3%	38.1%	16.15%
21-23 March 2022	Demoscopia	32.4%	36%	15%
22-25 March 2022	Opol	50.2%	32.6%	21.4%
23-27 March 2022	Enfoques	45%	33.7%	16.2%
24-28 March 2022	CIEP-UCR	41.4%	38%	18.1%

== Presidential primaries ==
=== National Liberation Party ===
Date	Polling firm	Alpízar	Araya	Benavides	Figueres	Thompson
10–13 March	OPol		17.9%	6.7%	27.6%	
15–21 April	Borge y Asociados	6.5%	18.3%	10,8%	24.3%	12,2%
14–18 May	Demoscopia	5%	17%	6%	38%	12%
22–27 May	Enfoque	3%	21%	6%	46%	12%
27–30 May	OPol	4%	28%	13%	36%	10%
4–5 June	OPol	9%	24%	11%	26%	10%
6 June	Result	6.05%	26.30%	13.44%	35.79%	15.38%

=== Social Christian Unity Party ===
Date	Polling firm	Masís	Muñoz	Saborío
10–13 March	OPol	1%	8%	5%
April	Enfoques	10%	18%	35%
5–11 April	OPol	7%	39%	35%
22–27 May	Enfoques	9%	17%	36%
11–16 June	Enfoques	14%	28%	58%
23–25 June	OPol	13%	28%	41%
27 June	Results	25%	19%	56%

=== Citizens' Action Party ===
Date	Polling firm	Hidalgo	González	Ramos	Solano	Zamora
March	Enfoques	26%		6%	2%	13%
April	Enfoques	31%		6%	8%	8%
21–27 May	Enfoques	28%		9%		
11–16 June	Enfoques	41%	23%	14%	9%	14%
22 August	Result	47%	1.5%	48%	3%	

== Legislative election ==
=== 2021 ===
Fieldwork Date	Polling firm	PLN	PRN	PAC	PUSC	PIN	PRSC	FA	PNG	PNR	Other	None	N/A	Lead
17–24 September	Demoscopía	26.2	1.4	8.2	6	0.5	–	2.2	–	2.1	4.3	39.9	9.2	18
28–31 July	Demoscopía	26	1.4	8.8	10	–	–	3.8	–	4.6	1.2	37.2	6.2	16
10–15 July	Enfoque	15	–	4	7	–	–	1	–	1	2	66	4	8
18–22 June	Demoscopía	26.4	1.5	12.3	6.3	0.2	–	4.3	–	4.2	1.3	37.2	6.0	14.1
June	Enfoque	19	1	3	6	–	–	1	–	2	1	64	3	13
22–27 May	Enfoque	21	1	4	4	–	–	1	–	1	2	63	3	17
April	Enfoque	19	2	6	5	–	–	1	–	1	3	61	2	13
10–13 March	OPol	14.3	0.7	1.9	6.2	0.1	0.1	0.4	–	1.7	–	72.4	–	8.1
March	Enfoque	29	1	7	10	–	–	2	–	1	1	45	4	19
January 15 – February 13	Borge y Asociados	20.9	–	7.5	5.7	–	–	–	–	3.3	–	57.4	–	13.4
6–8 January	OPol	19.5	1.8	5.7	9.6	0.6	0.5	3.1	0.1	0.9	–	55.5	2.4	9.9
January	Enfoque	27	6	3	8	–	–	2	–	2	2	41	10	19
2018 general election		19.5	18.2	16.3	14.6	7.7	4.2	4.0	2.2	–	13.3	–	–	1.3

=== Before 2021 ===
Fieldwork Date	Polling firm	PLN	PRN	PAC	PUSC	PIN	PRSC	FA	PNG	PNR	Other	None	N/A	Lead
December 2020	Enfoque	26	6	6	6	–	–	3	–	2	2	45	6	20
September 2020	Enfoque	26	4	4	9	–	–	4	–	1	2	42	8	17
April 2020	Enfoque	28	3	15	4	–	–	1	–	1	1	48	0	13
May 2019	CID Gallup	21	3	10	6	–	–	1	–	–	–	57	–	11
2018 general election		19.5	18.2	16.3	14.6	7.7	4.2	4.0	2.2	–	13.3	–	–	1.3
