= 2024 Costa Rican municipal elections =

- 4 February 2024

84 mayors, 518 aldermen, 491 syndics, 1936 district councillors, 7 intendants, 28 municipal district councillors and their alternates

	First party	Second party	Third party
Party	PLN	PUSC	UP
Mayors	29	20	9
Mayors +/–	▼13	▲4	▲8
	Fourth party	Fifth party	Sixth party
Party	PNG	PLP	PRSC
Mayors	4	3	2
Mayors +/–	=	New	=
	Seventh party	Eighth party	Ninth party
Party	PNR	PPSD	FA
Mayors	2	2	1
Mayors +/–	New	New	▲1

Municipal elections were held in Costa Rica on Sunday, February 4, 2024, to elect all municipal offices in the country: mayors, aldermen, syndics (district council presidents), district councilors and the intendants of seven special autonomous districts, together with their respective alternates in all cases (see local government in Costa Rica). These were the sixth direct municipal elections since the amendment to the 1998 Municipal Code and the second to be held mid-term since the 2009 reform.

In the newly founded canton of Monteverde and canton of Puerto Jiménez, the election of mayor and members of the City Council were held for the first time.

== See also ==
- Elections in Costa Rica
