= San Ignacio District =

San Ignacio District may refer to:

- San Ignacio District, Acosta, Acosta Canton, Costa Rica
- San Ignacio District, Paraguay
- San Ignacio District, Peru
