= 2016 Costa Rican municipal elections =

- 7 February 2016

81 mayors, 505 aldermen, 480 syndics, 1888 district councillors, 8 intendants, 32 municipal district councillors and their alternates
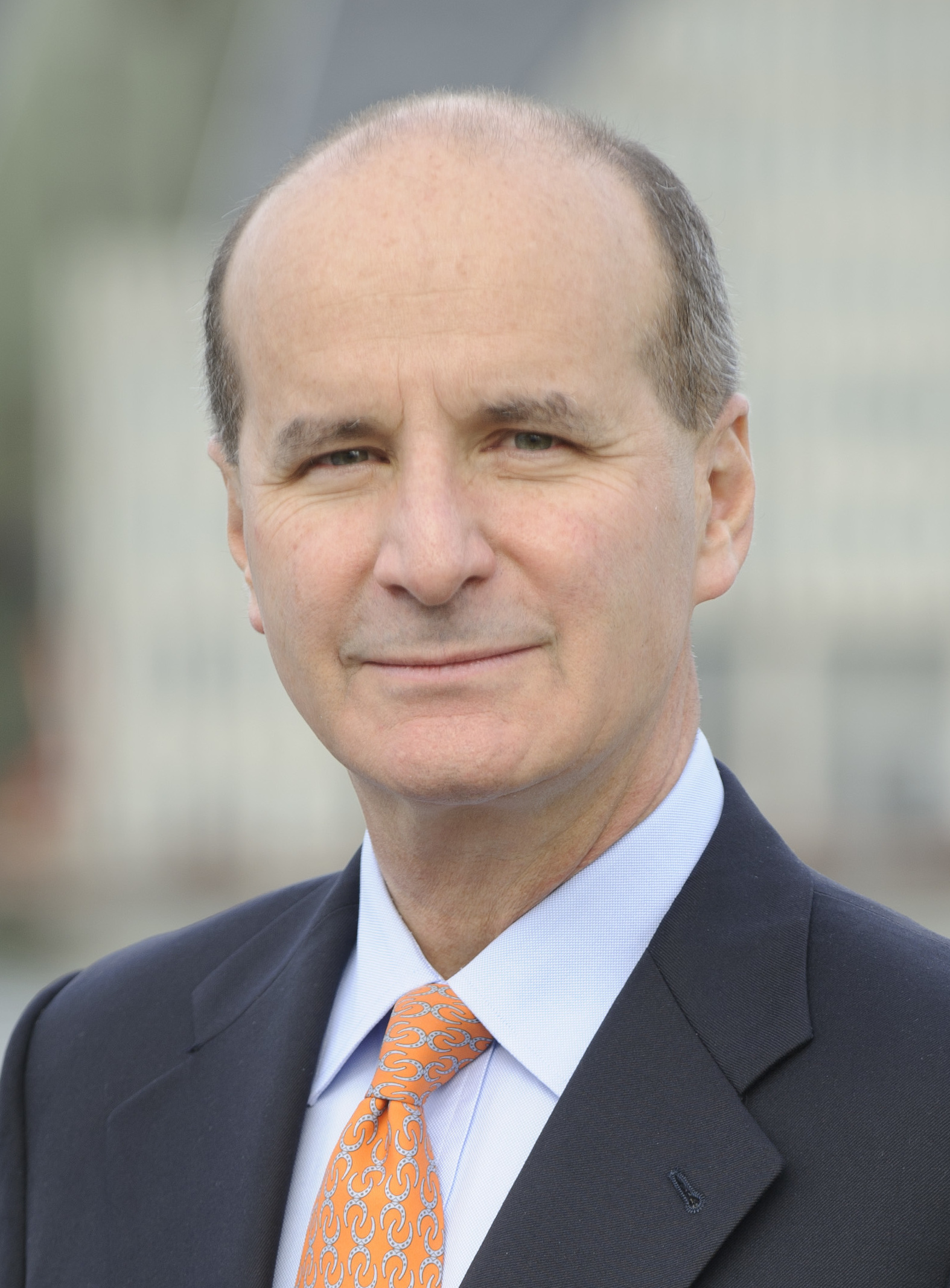

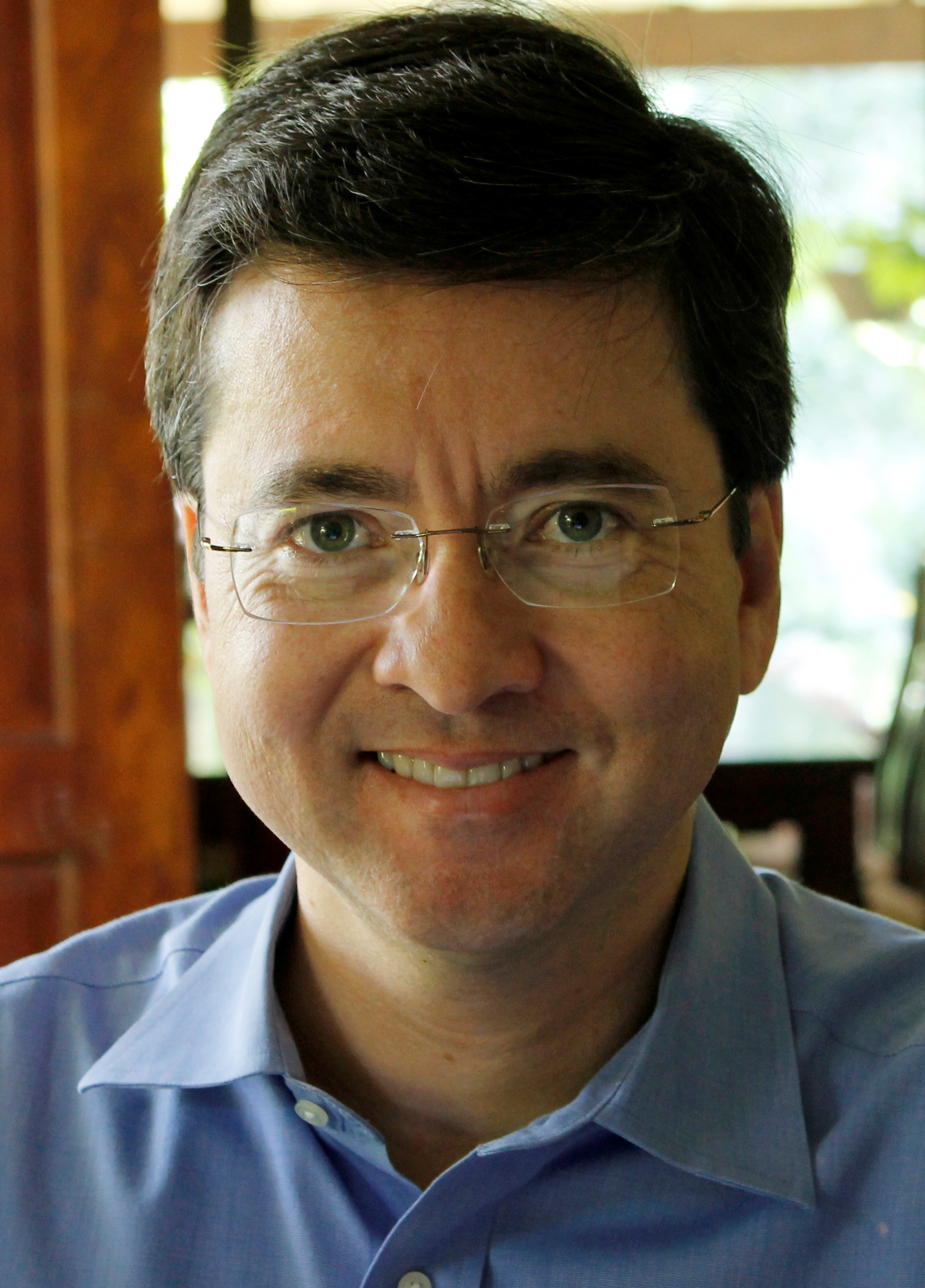

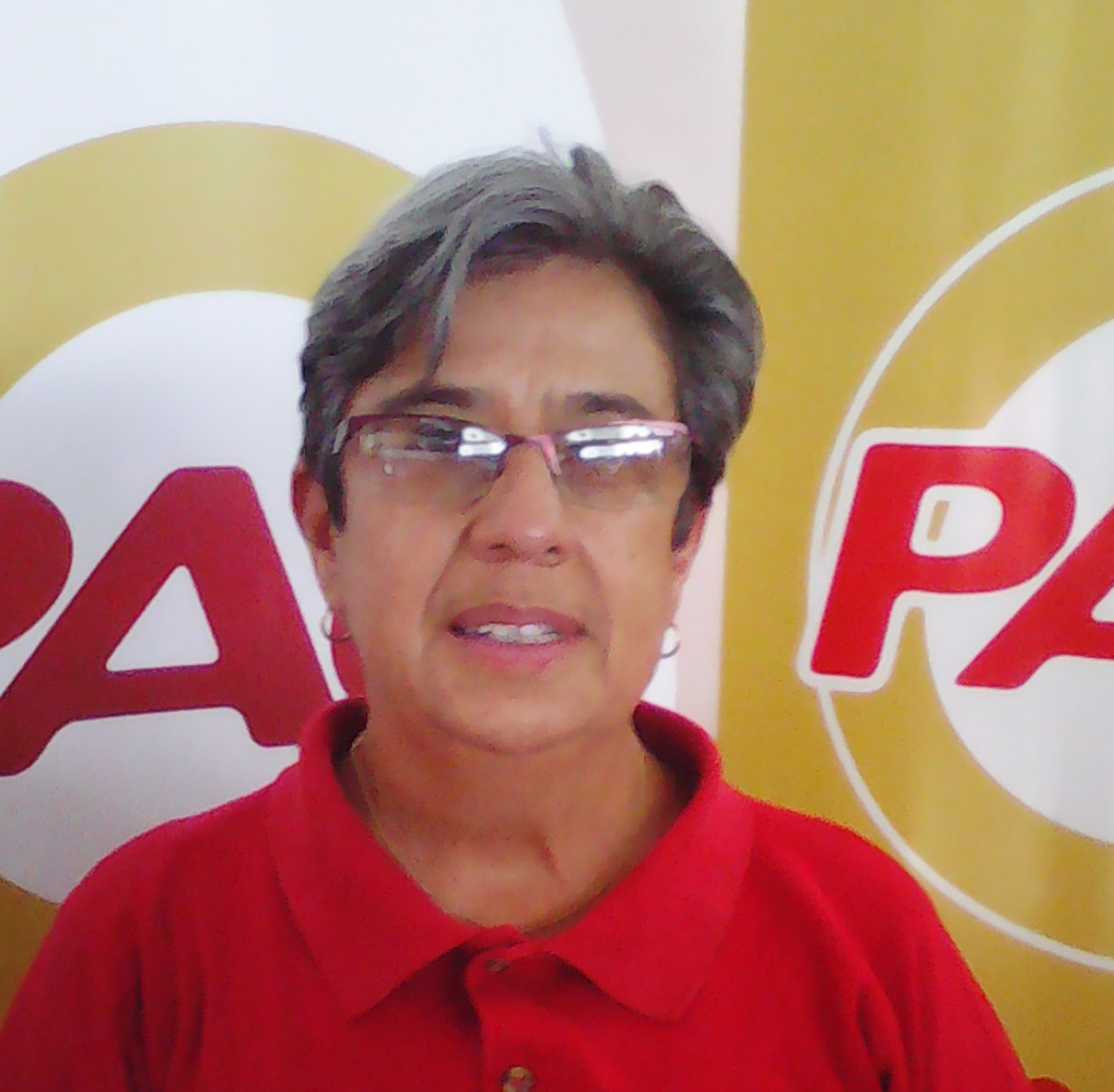

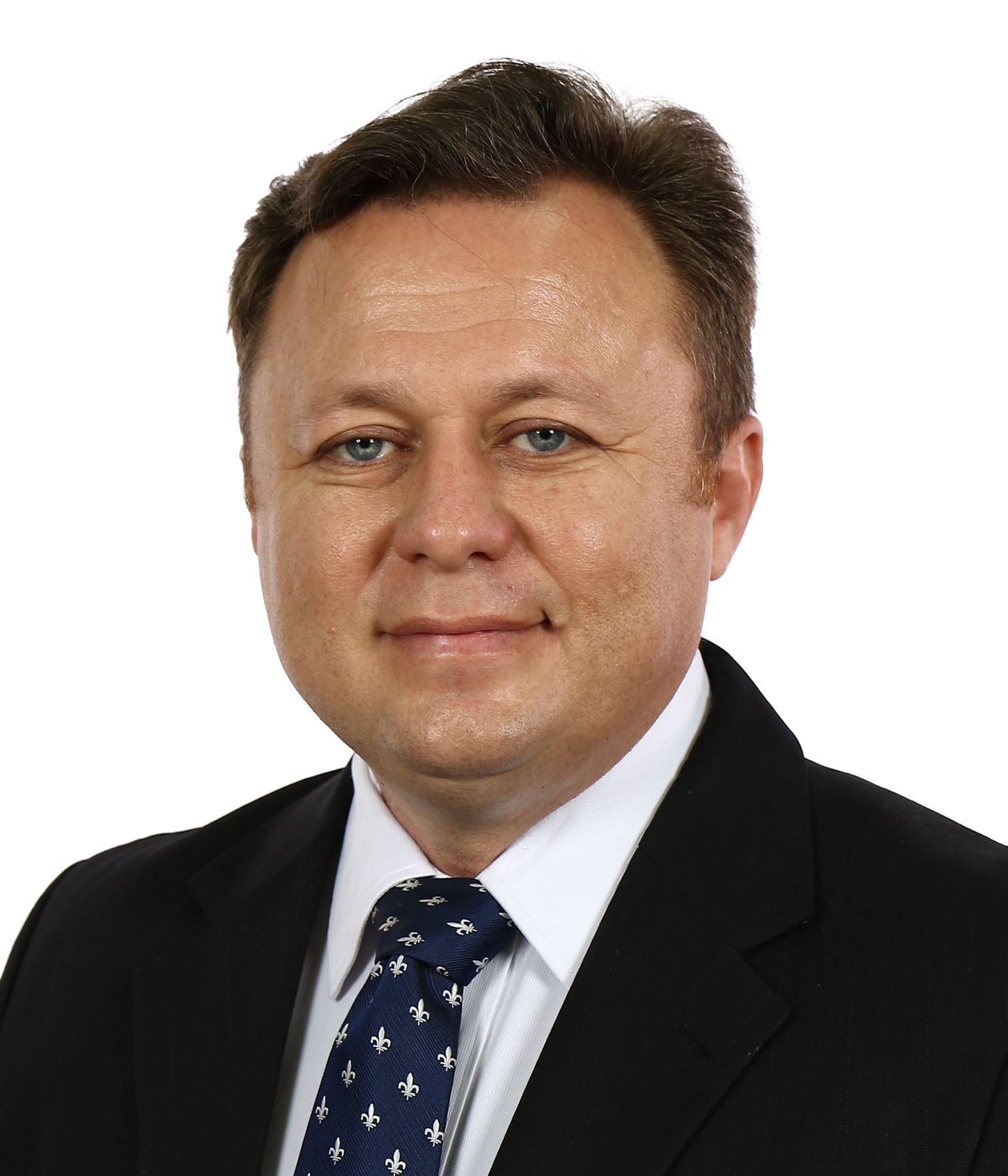

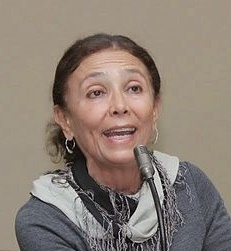

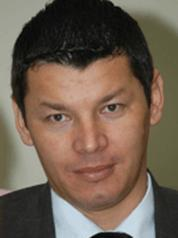
	First party	Second party	Third party
Leader	Jose Maria Figueres Olsen	Pedro Muñoz Fonseca	Margarita Bolaños Arquín
Party	PLN	PUSC	PAC
Mayors	50	14	7
Mayors +/–	▼9	▲5	▲1
Aldermen	186	103	64
Aldermen +/–	▼10	▲49	▼34
District Councillors	1765	575	506
District Councillors +/–	▼765	▼77	▲14
	Fourth party	Fifth party	Sixth party
Leader	Sergio Mena Díaz	Dragos Dolanescu Valenciano	Patricia Mora Castellanos
Party	PNG	PRSC	FA
Mayors	3	1	1
Mayors +/–	New	New
Aldermen	34	24	19
Aldermen +/–	New	New	▲18
District Councillors	71	167	73
District Councillors +/–	New	New	▲73
	Seventh party
Leader	Óscar Andrés López Arias
Party	PASE
Mayors	1
Mayors +/–	▼1
Aldermen	8
Aldermen +/–	▼17
District Councillors	24
District Councillors +/–	▼60
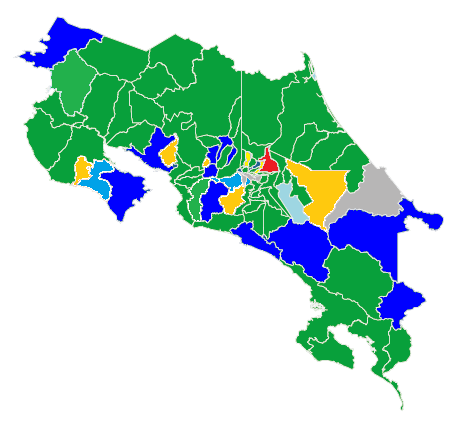
- PLN (50) PUSC (14) PAC (6) PNG (3) FA (1) PASE (1) PRSC (1) Local (4)

Municipal elections were held in Costa Rica on 7 February 2016, in order to elect the mayors of the 81 cantons of the country plus a proportional number of aldermen (regidores) in each of the canton's municipal councils, a syndic for every district and members of the District Councils and a total of 8 Intendants for districts and islands located too far away from the administrative center.

For the first time in history, election of aldermen was held at the same time as the other municipal offices. Until 2010 councilors were elected at the same time as the President and deputies in the general elections but a reform in the Electoral Law made all municipal offices elected at the same time and in the middle of the presidential period. Also, because of this change in the legislation, the previous election was held for a one-time only 6 years period.

Oppositional National Liberation Party earned most of the votes achieving majority in all offices including 50 mayors and 186 councilors, even though it suffer a noticeable decrease both in votes and offices obtained, including the loss of two provincial capitals; Limon city and San José city, both of them previously in hands of PLN's members that were expel from the party for ethical questionings and were nominated by local parties, among them former presidential nominee Johnny Araya. Social Christian Unity Party was recorded as the real winner as it increase its number of mayors passing from 9 to 15.

Ruling Citizens' Action Party was unable to take advantage of its position as government and only achieve one more mayor than previously. In several cantons the party went in alliance with local forces and the Broad Front.

Two new parties succeed in having new mayors; New Generation Party was a particular surprise as the party was the fourth in number of mayors winning in 3 cantons even though the party does not have parliamentary representation and received very few votes in the presidential ballot. While former president Rafael Ángel Calderón Fournier’s new Social Christian Republican Party won Vazquez de Coronado. Leftist Broad Front took part in the elections mostly in alliance with PAC and local forces winning in Montes de Oca and Acosta in that way and in one, Barva, completely alone. Local parties 21st Century Curridabat and Escazu's Progressive Yoke also won in Curridabat and Escazu respectively.

== Results ==
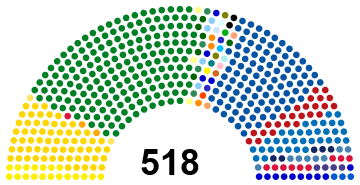
FA: 19 seats PAC: 64 seats CGMO: 2 seats CST: 2 seats AxB : 1 seat PLN: 188 seats CSXXI: 3 seats PAL: 5 seats YUNTA: 4 seats ASJ: 4 seats NMG: 3 seats VP: 3 seats AxP: 1 seat MASD: 1 seat RCLU: 1 seat PVEC: 1 seat PUG: 1 seat PAS: 2 seats PALABRA: 2 seats PSOL: 1 seat PECC: 1 seat ASLU: 1 seat PRA: 2 seats TPF: 1 seat LIRA: 1 seat PAMO: 1 seat PPG: 1 seat PAPI: 1 seat PRV: 1 seat PUSC: 103 seats PRSC: 24 seats PNG: 34 seats PIN: 5 seats PASE: 8 seats ML: 9 seats ADC: 4 seats PRC: 10 seats PREN: 3 seats

Party	Mayors	Syndics and district councilmen	Aldermen
National Liberation Party	50	3530	375
Social Christian Unity Party	15	1150	206
Citizens' Action Party	6	1012	128
New Generation Party	3	142	68
Social Christian Republican Party	1	334	48
Broad Front	1	147	38
Accessibility without Exclusion Party	1	48	16
San José Alliance	1	62	8
21st Century Curridabat	1	28	6
Limonese Authentic Party	1	22	10
Escazu's Progressive Yoke	1	20	8
Montes de Oca People Coalition (Citizens' Action Party-Broad Front-Patriotic Alliance-New Homeland Party-Humanist Party)	1	18	4
Libertarian Movement	0	62	18
Christian Democratic Alliance	0	58	8
National Integration Party	0	38	10
Costa Rican Renewal Party	0	28	20
New Greek Majority	0	24	6
Live Puntarenas	0	22	6
Palmares Alliance	0	22	2
Santo Domingo's Advance Movement	0	20	2
La Union's Cantonal Rescue	0	14	4
Cartago Green Party	0	12	2
Guarcian Union Party	0	12	2
We Are Tibas Coalition (Citizens' Action Party-Broad Front-Fuenteovejuna's Civic Party of Tibas)	0	10	4
Siquirrian Authentic Party	0	12	4
Authentic Famer Coronado Party	0	10	4
Party of the Sun	0	10	2
Costa Rican Ecological Community Party	0	10	2
La Union's Social Alliance	0	10	2
Let's Renew Alajuela Party	0	8	4
All for Flores	0	6	2
Ramonese League	0	4	2
Belen Alliance (Citizens' Action Party-Independent Belemite Party)	0	4	2
Montes de Oca Advance	0	4	2
Garabito People	0	2	2
United Desamparados	0	4	0
Ecological Garabito	0	4	0
Independent Parrita	0	2	2
Montes de Oro Autonomous Party	0	2	0
Cartago Renewal	0	2	0
United for Guatuso (Citizens' Action Party-Broad Front)	0	2	0
National Restoration Party	0	0	6
Recovering Values	0	0	2

== See also ==
- Local government in Costa Rica
- List of mayors in Costa Rica
