= Sabanillas =

District in Acosta canton, San José province, Costa Rica

- District
- Sabanillas district
- Sabanillas district location in Costa Rica
- Coordinates: 9.6970812°N 84.258175°W
- Country: Costa Rica
- Province: San José
- Canton: Acosta

Area
  - Total: 176.83 km^{2} (68.27 sq mi)
- Elevation: 1,122 m (3,681 ft)

Population (2011)
  - Total: 2,331
  - Density: 13.18/km^{2} (34.14/sq mi)
- Time zone: UTC−06:00
- Postal code: 11205

Sabanillas is a district of the Acosta canton, in the San José province of Costa Rica.

== Geography ==
Sabanillas has an area of 176.83 km^{2} and an elevation of 1,122 metres.

== Demographics ==
Historical population
Census	Pop.	±% p.a.
1883	409	—
1892	590	+4.16%
1927	1,596	+2.88%
1950	1,996	+0.98%
1963	3,154	+3.58%
1973	3,249	+0.30%
1984	3,006	−0.70%
2000	2,539	−1.05%
2011	2,331	−0.77%
2022	1,702	−2.82%
Source: Instituto Nacional de Estadística y Censos; Centro Centroamericano de Población

For the 2011 census, Sabanillas had a population of 2,331 inhabitants.

== Transportation ==
=== Road transportation ===
The district is covered by the following road routes:

- National Route 301
