= A Just Costa Rica =

Costa Rican political party

A Just Costa Rica Costa Rica Justa
- Abbreviation: CRJ
- Founder: Dragos Dolanescu Valenciano
- Founded: 2 June 2020
- Registered: 28 July 2021
- Split from: Social Christian Republican Party
- Headquarters: Alajuela
- Youth wing: Justa Juventud
- Ideology: Christian democracy Social conservatism Subsidiarity
- Political position: Centre
- Colours: Azure; Yellow; Magenta
- Legislative Assembly: 0 / 57

Website
- www.costaricajusta.cr

A Just Costa Rica (Spanish: Costa Rica Justa; CRJ) is a Costa Rican political party. It nominated engineer Rolando Araya Monge as a presidential candidate for the 2022 Costa Rican general election.

== History ==
Costa Rica Justa was founded by the deputy Dragos Dolanescu Valenciano, originally president and elected deputy for the Social Christian Republican Party. He resigned from the party when the executive committee denounced him before the Public Ministry for alleged irregularities in the handling of funds. Dolanescu announced in social media that he will be meassuing the level of popular support in order to decide whether he will be presidential candidate.

After completing the registration process, the presidential candidacy was offered to former minister and two-time previous presidential candidate Rolando Araya, who lost the 2021 National Liberation Party convention, finishing second. Araya was elected not only presidential candidate but as head of the list for the Legislative Assembly of Costa Rica.

== Ideology ==
Some controversy was generated by the fact that Dolanescu comes from a conservative party and his positions as a deputy and on social media have been described as right-wing populist and conservative. Araya, on the other hand, comes from a democratic socialist tradition, was vice president of the Socialist International and has held various positions in the organization, also being known for his progressive positions on economic and social policies. Araya defended himself stating that the helm of the party and therefore his ideological orientation would be defined by him.

== Electoral performance ==
=== Presidential ===
Election	Candidate	First round				Second round			
Election	Candidate	Votes	%	Position	Result	Votes	%	Position	Result
2022	Rolando Araya Monge	19,951	0.95%	7th	Lost	—N/a			

=== Parliamentary ===
Election	Leader	Votes	%	Seats	+/–	Position	Government
2022	Rolando Araya Monge	25,347	1.22%	0 / 57	New	12th	Extra-parliamentary
