= List of mayors in Costa Rica =

This is a list of mayors in Costa Rica, as of the 2024 Municipal Elections:

Province	Canton	Mayor	Party
San Jose Province
San Jose Province	San José	Diego Miranda Méndez	Juntos por San José
San Jose Province	Escazú	Orlando Esteban Umaña	Partido Nueva Generación
San Jose Province	Desamparados	María Antonieta Naranjo Brenes	Partido Liberación Nacional
San Jose Province	Puriscal	Iris Cristina Arroyo Herrera	Partido Liberación Nacional
San Jose Province	Tarrazú	Fernando Portuguez Parra	Partido Unidad Social Cristiana
San Jose Province	Aserrí	Patricia Porras Segura	Partido Liberación Nacional
San Jose Province	Mora	Adolfo Jiménez Cascante	Partido Liberal Progresista
San Jose Province	Goicoechea	Fernando Chavarría Quirós	Partido Liberación Nacional
San Jose Province	Santa Ana	Juan José Vargas Fallas	Partido Unidad Social Cristiana
San Jose Province	Alajuelita	María Siles Fernández	Partido Nueva Generación
San Jose Province	Vázquez de Coronado	Yamileth Quesada Zúñiga	Partido Liberación Nacional
San Jose Province	Acosta	Nelson Umaña Quirós	Partido Liberación Nacional
San Jose Province	Tibás	Alejandro Alvarado Vega	Partido Liberación Nacional
San Jose Province	Moravia	Diego Armando López López	Somos Moravia
San Jose Province	Montes de Oca	Domingo Argüello García	Partido Unidad Social Cristiana
San Jose Province	Turrubares	Martín Vargas Calderón	Partido Unidos Podemos
San Jose Province	Dota	Adrián Cordero Cordero	Partido Unidad Social Cristiana
San Jose Province	Curridabat	Errol Solano Bolaños	Curridabat Siglo XXI
San Jose Province	Pérez Zeledón	Emiliano Ceciliano Alfaro	Partido Unidad Social Cristiana
San Jose Province	León Cortés Castro	Juan Manuel Quirós Sánchez	Frente Amplio
Alajuela Province
Alajuela Province	Alajuela	Roberto Thompson Chacón	Partido Liberación Nacional
Alajuela Province	San Ramón	Gabriela Jiménez Corrales	Partido Unidad Social Cristiana
Alajuela Province	Grecia	Donald Quesada Rodríguez	Partido Unidos Podemos
Alajuela Province	San Mateo	Karen Tatiana Alfaro Jiménez	Partido Liberación Nacional
Alajuela Province	Atenas	Máximo Chaves Ovares	Partido Progreso Social Democrático
Alajuela Province	Naranjo	Randall Vega Blanco	Partido Liberación Nacional
Alajuela Province	Palmares	José Andrés Vargas Rodríguez	Palmares Primero
Alajuela Province	Poás	Heibel Antonio Rodríguez Araya	Partido Unidad Social Cristiana
Alajuela Province	Orotina	Margot Montero Jiménez	Partido Liberación Nacional
Alajuela Province	San Carlos	Juan Diego González Picado	Partido Liberación Nacional
Alajuela Province	Zarcero	Gina Rodríguez Rojas	Partido Liberación Nacional
Alajuela Province	Sarchí	Maikol Porras Morales	Alianza por Sarchí
Alajuela Province	Upala	Aura López Obregón	Partido Unidad Social Cristiana
Alajuela Province	Los Chiles	Juan Abel Beteta Ocampo	Partido Liberación Nacional
Alajuela Province	Guatuso	Carlos Sequeira Orozco	Partido Unidad Social Cristiana
Alajuela Province	Río Cuarto	José Miguel Jiménez Araya	Partido Liberación Nacional
Cartago Province
Cartago Province	Cartago	Mario Redondo Poveda	Actuemos Ya
Cartago Province	Paraíso	Michaell Álvarez Quirós	Partido Unidos Podemos
Cartago Province	La Unión	Cristian Torres Garita	Partido Liberación Nacional
Cartago Province	Jiménez	Ana Isabel Azofeifa Pereira	Partido Liberación Nacional
Cartago Province	Turrialba	Carlos Eduardo Hidalgo Flores	Partido Nueva Generación
Cartago Province	Alvarado	Karol Fabiola Granados Martínez	Partido Unidos Podemos
Cartago Province	Oreamuno	Erick Mauricio Jiménez Valverde	Partido Unidos Podemos
Cartago Province	El Guarco	Víctor Hugo Monestel Tencio	Partido Liberación Nacional
Heredia Province
Heredia Province	Heredia	Ángela Ileana Aguilar Vargas	Partido Liberación Nacional
Heredia Province	Barva	Jorge Antonio Acuña Prado	Partido Republicano Social Cristiano
Heredia Province	Santo Domingo	Jorge Luis Fonseca Fonseca	Partido Liberación Nacional
Heredia Province	Santa Bárbara	Víctor Manuel Hidalgo Solís	Partido Liberación Nacional
Heredia Province	San Rafael	Jorge Eduardo Arias Santamaría	Bienestar Rafaeleño
Heredia Province	San Isidro	Eddie Ramírez Sánchez	Avance Isidreño
Heredia Province	Belén	Zeneida Chaves Fernández	Partido Unidad Social Cristiana
Heredia Province	Flores	Eder José Ramírez Segura	Partido Liberación Nacional
Heredia Province	San Pablo	Bernardo Porras López	Partido Unidad Social Cristiana
Heredia Province	Sarapiquí	Vanessa Rodríguez Rodríguez	Partido Liberación Nacional
Guanacaste Province
Guanacaste Province	Liberia	José Javier Calvo Darcia	Partido Liberación Nacional
Guanacaste Province	Nicoya	Carlos Armando Martínez Arias	La Gran Nicoya
Guanacaste Province	Santa Cruz	Jorge Arturo Alfaro Orias	Auténtico Santa Cruceño
Guanacaste Province	Bagaces	Daniel Alonso González	Partido Liberal Progresista
Guanacaste Province	Carrillo	Diana Cecilia Méndez Masís	Partido Progreso Social Democrático
Guanacaste Province	Cañas	Alexander Elizondo Duarte	Partido Unidos Podemos
Guanacaste Province	Abangares	Gerardo Alfredo Cascante Suárez	Partido Unidos Podemos
Guanacaste Province	Tilarán	Katterin Alfaro López	Partido Liberación Nacional
Guanacaste Province	Nandayure	Teddy Osvaldo Zúñiga Sánchez	Partido Unidad Social Cristiana
Guanacaste Province	La Cruz	Luis Alonso Alan Corea	Partido Nueva Generación
Guanacaste Province	Hojancha	Verónica Campos Barrantes	Partido Unidad Social Cristiana
Puntarenas Province
Puntarenas Province	Puntarenas	Randall Alexis Chavarría Matarrita	Partido Unidad Social Cristiana
Puntarenas Province	Esparza	Bienvenido Venegas Porras	Partido Unidad Social Cristiana
Puntarenas Province	Buenos Aires	Ana Margoth Mora Navarro	Partido Liberación Nacional
Puntarenas Province	Montes de Oro	Anthony Fallas Jiménez	Partido Liberación Nacional
Puntarenas Province	Osa	Mainor Fernando Anchía Angulo	Partido Nuestro Pueblo
Puntarenas Province	Quepos	Patricia Mayela Bolaños Murillo	Partido Unidad Social Cristiana
Puntarenas Province	Golfito	Freiner William Lara Blanco	Partido Unidad Social Cristiana
Puntarenas Province	Coto Brus	Rafael Ángel Navarro Umaña	Partido Unidad Social Cristiana
Puntarenas Province	Parrita	Roberto Alonso Rímola Real	Partido Nuestro Pueblo
Puntarenas Province	Corredores	Yeison Hay Villalobos	Partido Liberación Nacional
Puntarenas Province	Garabito	Francisco José González Madrigal	Pueblo Garabito
Puntarenas Province	Monteverde	Yeudy Miguel Ramírez Brenes	Partido Republicano Social Cristiano
Puntarenas Province	Puerto Jiménez	Enrique Segnini Saballo	Partido Liberal Progresista
Limón Province
Limón Province	Limón	Ana Janniel Matarrita McCalla	Partido Unidos Podemos
Limón Province	Pococí	Manuel Hernández Rivera	Partido Unidos Podemos
Limón Province	Siquirres	Randal Black Reid	Partido Liberación Nacional
Limón Province	Talamanca	Rugeli Morales Rodríguez	Partido Unidad Social Cristiana
Limón Province	Matina	Wálter Céspedes Salazar	Partido Unidad Social Cristiana
Limón Province	Guácimo	Beatriz Mora Valverde	Justicia Social Costarricense

== See also ==
- Local government in Costa Rica
