= Cangrejal =

District in Acosta canton, San José province, Costa Rica

- District
- Interactive map of Cangrejal
- Cangrejal district location in Costa Rica
- Coordinates: 9.7407627°N 84.1890186°W
- Country: Costa Rica
- Province: San José
- Canton: Acosta

Area
  - Total: 64.46 km^{2} (24.89 sq mi)
- Elevation: 700 m (2,300 ft)

Population (2011)
  - Total: 1,875
  - Density: 29.09/km^{2} (75.34/sq mi)
- Time zone: UTC−06:00
- Postal code: 11204

Cangrejal is a district of the Acosta canton, in the San José province of Costa Rica.

== Geography ==
Cangrejal has an area of 64.46 km^{2} and an elevation of 700 metres.

== Demographics ==
Historical population
Census	Pop.	±% p.a.
1883	239	—
1892	346	+4.20%
1927	1,136	+3.46%
1950	1,664	+1.67%
1963	1,712	+0.22%
1973	2,181	+2.45%
1984	1,924	−1.13%
2000	1,987	+0.20%
2011	1,875	−0.53%
2022	1,875	+0.00%
Source: Instituto Nacional de Estadística y Censos; Centro Centroamericano de Población

For the 2011 census, Cangrejal had a population of 1,875 inhabitants.

== Transportation ==
=== Road transportation ===
The district is covered by the following road routes:

- National Route 301
