= Acosta (canton) =

Canton in San José province, Costa Rica

- Canton
- Flag Seal
- Interactive map of Acosta
- Acosta canton location in San José Province Acosta canton location in Costa Rica
- Coordinates: 9.7415933°N 84.2366847°W
- Country: Costa Rica
- Province: San José
- Creation: 27 October 1910
- Head city: San Ignacio
- Districts: Districts: San Ignacio; Guaitil; Palmichal; Cangrejal; Sabanillas

Government
  - Type: Municipality
  - Body: Municipalidad de Acosta
  - Mayor: Nelson Martín Umaña Quirós (PLN)

Area
  - Total: 342.56 km^{2} (132.26 sq mi)
- Elevation: 1,009 m (3,310 ft)

Population (2011)
  - Total: 20,209
  - Estimate (2022): 22,542
  - Density: 58.994/km^{2} (152.79/sq mi)
- Time zone: UTC−06:00
- Canton code: 112
- Website: www.acosta.go.cr

Acosta is the twelfth canton in the province of San José in Costa Rica. The head city of the canton is San Ignacio.

== History ==
Acosta was created on 27 October 1910 by decree 24.

== Geography ==
Acosta has an area of 342.56 km^{2} (132.26 sq mi) and a mean elevation of 1,009 m (3,310 ft).

The mountainous canton begins in the Cerros de Escazú on the far western edge of the San José Metropolitan Area. It continues west and south between the Negro River on the north and the Jorco River on the east to encompass a large portion of the Coastal Mountain Range, ending at the border of Puntarenas Province near the Pacific coast in Parrita Canton.

== Government ==
=== Mayor ===
According to Costa Rica's Municipal Code, mayors are elected every four years by the population of the canton. As of the latest municipal elections in 2024, the National Liberation Party candidate, Nelson Martín Umaña Quirós, was elected mayor of the canton with 41.92% of the votes, with Tania Granados Borbón and Marianela Arias Elizondo as first and second vice mayors, respectively.

Mayors of Acosta since the 2002 elections
Period	Name	Party
2002–2006	Ronald Ricardo Durán Gamboa	PLN
2006–2010	Ronald Ricardo Durán Gamboa	PLN
2010–2016	Luis Alberto Durán Gamboa	PLN
2016–2020	Norman Eduardo Hidalgo Gamboa	PAC
2020–2024	Norman Eduardo Hidalgo Gamboa	PAC
2024–2028	Nelson Martín Umaña Quirós	PLN

=== Municipal Council ===
Like the mayor and vice mayors, members of the Municipal Council (called regidores) are elected every four years. Acosta's Municipal Council has 5 seats for regidores and their substitutes, who can participate in meetings but not vote unless the owning regidor (regidor propietario) is absent. The Municipal Council's composition for the 2024–2028 period is as follows:

Composition of the Municipal Council of Acosta after the 2024 municipal elections
Political parties in the Municipal Council of Acosta
Political party	Regidores		
Political party	№	Owner	Substitute
National Liberation Party (PLN)	2	Olga Vargas Sánchez (Note: Also legally named Alba Vargas Sánchez.)	Seidy Lucía Chinchilla Garro
National Liberation Party (PLN)	2	Fermin Carrillo Palma	Antonio Chinchilla Vindas
Social Christian Unity Party (PUSC)	2	Christian Javier Arias Hidalgo	Sergio Manuel Ramírez Azofeifa
Social Christian Unity Party (PUSC)	2	Julissa Castro Murcia	Roxana Sánchez Prado
Progressive Liberal Party (PLP)	1	Fabio Mauricio Arias Prado	Eddy Calderón Jiménez

== Districts ==
The canton of Acosta is subdivided into the following districts:

1. San Ignacio
2. Guaitil
3. Palmichal
4. Cangrejal
5. Sabanillas

== Demographics ==
Historical population
Census	Pop.	±% p.a.
1927	7,474	—
1950	10,160	+1.34%
1963	13,092	+1.97%
1973	14,385	+0.95%
1984	14,853	+0.29%
2000	18,661	+1.44%
2011	20,209	+0.73%
2022	22,542	+1.00%
Source: Instituto Nacional de Estadística y Censos; Centro Centroamericano de Población

Acosta had an estimated population of 22,542 people in 2022, up from 20,209 at the time of the 2011 census.

Acosta had a Human Development Index of 0.731 in 2022.

== Transportation ==
=== Road transportation ===
The canton is covered by the following road routes:

- National Route 209
- National Route 301
