= 2021 National Liberation Party presidential primary =

National Liberation Party presidential primary, 2021
← 2017	6 June 2021
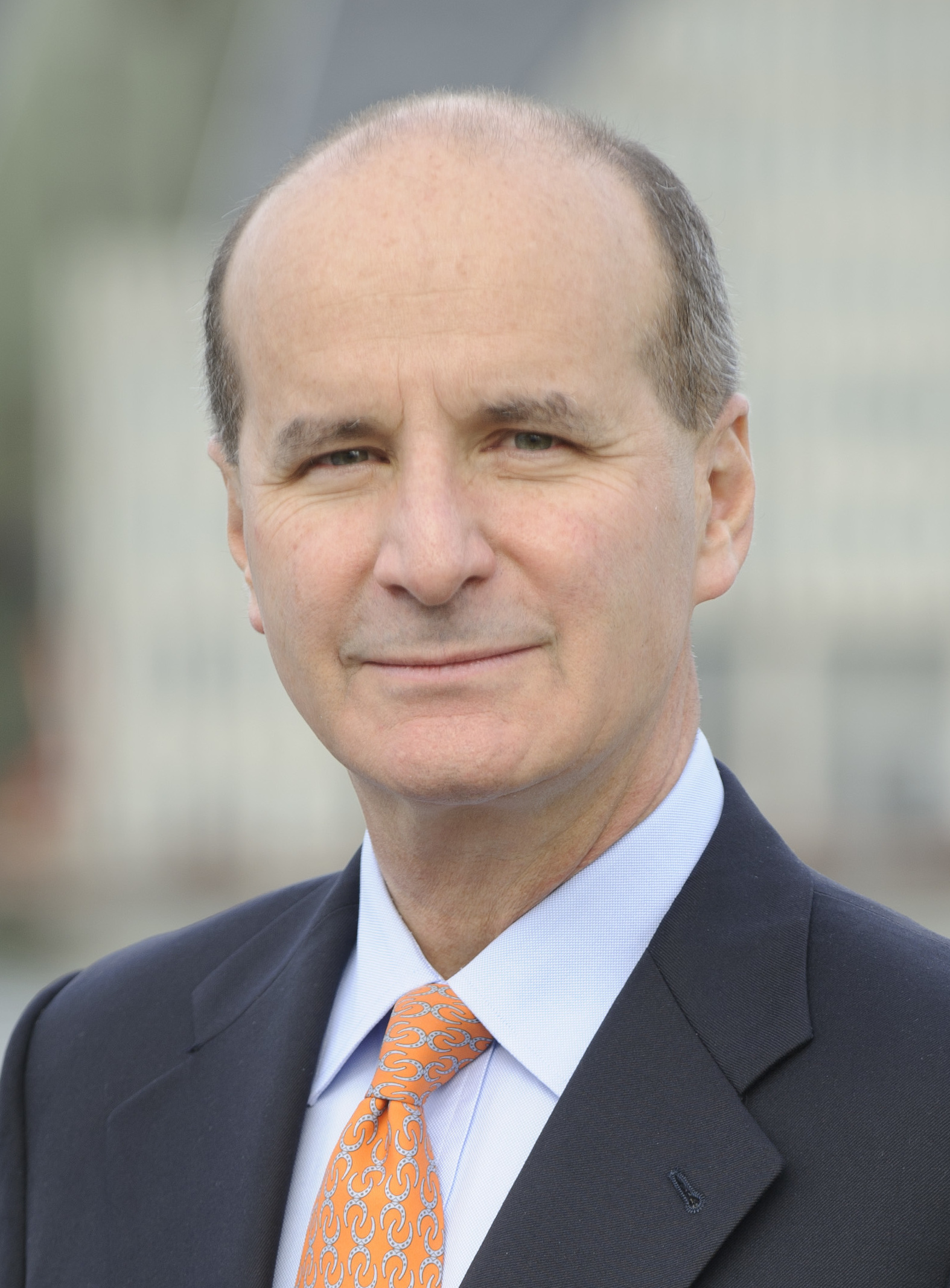

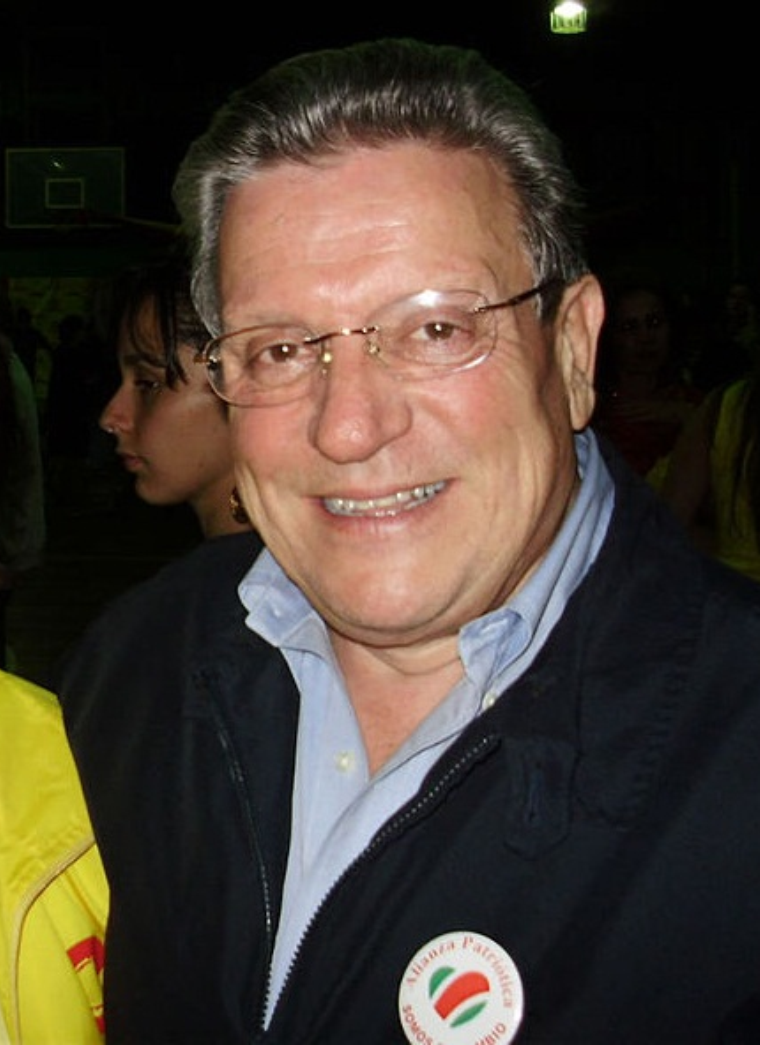

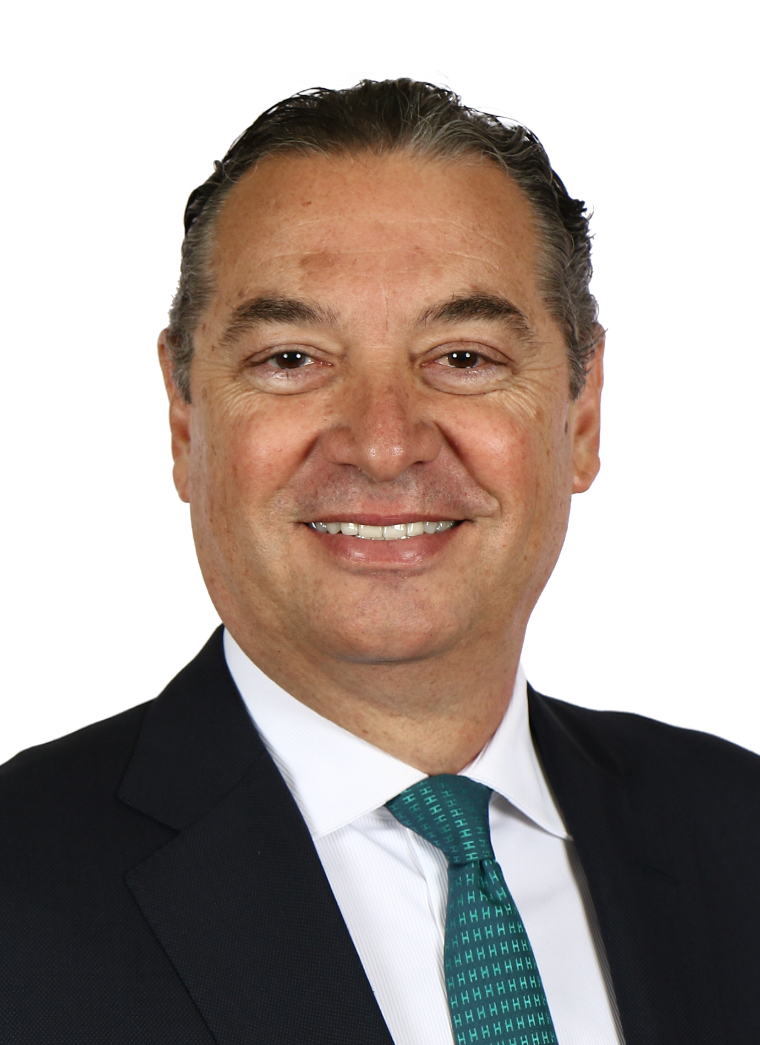

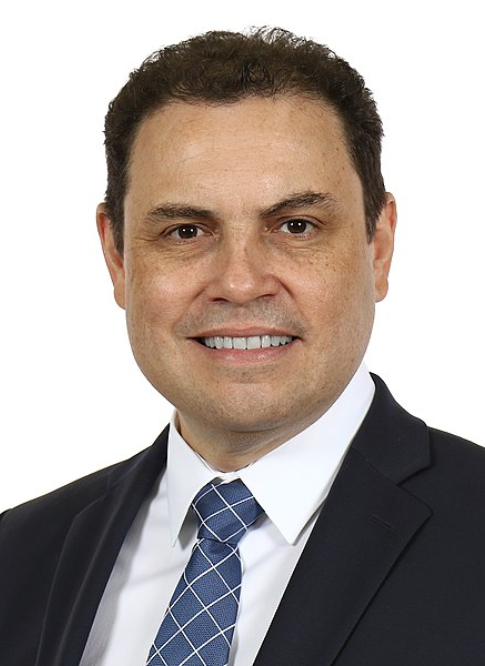
Nominee	José María Figueres Olsen	Rolando Araya Monge	Roberto Thompson Chacón
Party	PLN	PLN	PLN
Alliance	Figuerism	Arayism	Arism
Popular vote	144,295	105,348	62,108
Percentage	35.85%	26.17%	15.43%
Nominee	Carlos Ricardo Benavides Jiménez	Claudio Alpízar Otoya
Party	PLN	PLN
Alliance	Arism	Independent
Popular vote	54,106	24,268
Percentage	13.44%	6.03%
Previous Presidential Candidate
Antonio Álvarez Desanti
Presidential Candidate
Jose Maria Figueres Olsen

The 2021 National Liberation Party Convention was the primary election process by which supporters of the National Liberation Party, the first opposition force in Costa Rica, selected their presidential candidate for the 2022 general elections. Former President José María Figueres was victorious.

== Precedents ==
Antonio Álvarez Desanti, winner of the 2017 National Liberation Convention and therefore a candidate for the 2018 presidential elections, gave the party its worst electoral result in its history, obtaining 18% of the total votes in the first round, the lower percentage obtained by the group, as well as by not going to the second round for the first time in history. In April 2021, Álvarez granted his adhesion to the former president of the Republic, José María Figueres Olsen.

== Reforms ==
On December 12, 2020, the National Assembly of the National Liberation Party approved to carry out a series of reforms to its statute in view of the general elections of 2022, among them the reduction of the number of candidacies for deputation that the elected presidential candidate can choose going from four to one, and the approval to hold a convention with an open registry, instead of one with a closed registry and mandatory party affiliation as it was before. Likewise, June 6, 2021, was established as the date on which the National Liberation Convention would be held.

On March 9, 2021, the National Superior Executive Committee of the party published the registration fees for the internal election process, setting a quota of 29 million Costa Rican colones for the registration of each of the candidates.

== Consensus candidacy ==
On February 20, 2021, the national media Amelia Rueda reported that the former president of the Republic, Óscar Arias Sánchez, had a conversation with the former presidents José María Figueres Olsen and Laura Chinchilla Miranda, in which he proposed that they will choose a presidential candidate by consensus for the National Liberation Party. The proposal consisted of each one proposing up to two names of possible candidates, and, from among them, the former presidents would choose a candidacy that should be ratified by the party's National Assembly. He would be informed later by President Chinchilla, for through an announcement on his official Twitter profile, and by President Figueres, through an interview, that they would not support the proposal of President Arias.

Óscar Arias, after the ex-presidents' rejection of his proposal, would propose the former vice president of the Republic in the Figueres Olsen administration, Rebeca Grynspan Mayufis, as his consensus candidate. However, the former vice president would reject the offer proposed by the former president.

== Candidates ==
=== Registered ===
Name	Birth	Previous offices	Home province	Campaign Start date	Reference
Carlos Ricardo Benavides Jiménez	29 August 1969 (55); Puntarenas, Puntarenas	San José Deputy (2018–present); President of the Legislative Assembly (2019-2020); Minister of the Presidency (2011-2014); Puntarenas Deputy (2002-2006)	San José	Campaign Announce: 24; March 2021	
Claudio Alpízar Otoya	28 November 1962 (62); Hospital, San José	Political scientist	San José	Campaign Announce: 5 January 2021; Start: 1 February 2021	
José María Figueres Olsen	24 December 1954 (70); Catedral, San José	President of Costa Rica (1994-1998); President of the National Liberation Party (2015-2016); Minister of Agriculture (1989-1990); Minister of Commerce (2006-2010)	San José	Campaign Announce: 31 March 2021; Start: 15 April 2021	
Roberto Thompson Chacón	10 July 1960 (64); Alajuela, Alajuela	Alajuela Deputy (2018–present); Mayor of Alajuela (2010-2018); Vice-minister of Policial Issues and Citizen Dialogue (2006-2010)	Alajuela	Campaign Announce: 15 February 2021; Start: 18 March 2021	
Rolando Araya Monge	20 August 1947 (77); Palmares, Palmares	San José Deputy (1974-1978); Minister of Public Works and Transport (1982-1984); Mayor of San José (1978-1980); Presidential candidate in 2002 and 2010	San José	Campaign Announce: 9 February 2021; Start: 19 March 2021	

=== Retired ===
Name	Birth	Previous offices	Campaign's start	Campaign's end	Home province	Campaign	Reference
Antonio Álvarez	6 July 1958 (62 años); Hospital, San José	President of the Legislative Assembly of Costa Rica (1995-1996, 2016–2017); San José Deputy (1994-1998, 2014–2017); Presidential candidate 2006 and 2018	-	6 April 2021	San José	-	
Fernando Zamora	22 May1968 (52 años); Catedral, San José	Secretary General National Liberation Party (2014-2018)	13 March 2021	9 April 2021	San José		
Guillermo Constenla Umaña	1 February 1944 (77 years old); Catedral, San José	San José Deputy (1998-2002) President of the National Liberation Party (2019-2020) Executive President of the National Insurance Institute (2010-2014) Minister of Public Works and Transport (1986-1988)	2 de febrero de 2021	16 de abril de 2021	Alajuela		

=== Discarded ===
- Laura Chinchilla Miranda, former president (endorsed Benavides).
- Óscar Arias Sánchez, former president.
- Gerardo Corrales Brenes, banker and entrepreneur.
- Rebeca Grynspan Mayufis, former Vice President.
- Rolando González Ulloa, former deputy.
- Rodrigo Arias Sánchez, former Minister of the Presidency (endorsed Benavides).
