= United We Can =

Political party in Costa Rica

United We Can Unidos Podemos
- President: Natalia Diaz
- Secretary-General: José Alberto Grillo Rosanía
- Founded: 28 November 2018; 7 years ago
- Split from: Libertarian Movement
- Ideology: Classical liberalism
- Political position: Centre-right to right-wing
- Colours: Purple and Orange
- Legislative Assembly: 0 / 57
- Mayors: 9 / 84
- Alderpeople: 39 / 518
- Syndics: 36 / 491
- District councillors: 130 / 1,936
- Intendants: 2 / 7

Party flag

Website
- www.unidospodemos.cr

United We Can (Spanish: Unidos Podemos) is a Costa Rican classical liberal political party founded by the former deputy and former Libertarian Movement member Natalia Díaz Quintana. The party culminated its process of cantonal and provincial assemblies in November 2018 allowing it to participate in the 2020 Costa Rican municipal elections.

The party was founded by Díaz, who was deputy for the 2014-2018 period from Otto Guevara's Libertarian Movement. She would face Guevara in the party's first primary election, the National Libertarian Convention of 2017. Diaz lost with only a 10% gap. Díaz would not support Guevara as a candidate in the 2018 general election and would in fact give her adhesion to PNL nominee Antonio Álvarez Desanti. She started the creation of the party shortly after the presidential run ended, concluding it in November 2018.

As of 2018, the party began talks with other political forces such as New Generation, the Christian Democratic Alliance, Costa Rican Renewal, the Social Christian Republican Party, the Libertarian Movement and a faction of the Social Christian Unity Party to negotiate a right-wing coalition for the 2022 election; however, the talks stalled.

== Electoral performance ==
=== Presidential ===
Election	Candidate	First round				Second round			
Election	Candidate	Votes	%	Position	Result	Votes	%	Position	Result
2022	Natalia Díaz Quintana	16,496	0.79%	9th	Lost	—N/a			
2026	Natalia Díaz Quintana	21,492	0.84%	8th	Lost	—N/a			

=== Parliamentary ===
Election	Leader	Votes	%	Seats	+/–	Position	Government
2022	Natalia Díaz Quintana	21,100	1.02%	0 / 57	New	16th	Extra-parliamentary
2026	Natalia Díaz Quintana	30,421	1.20%	0 / 57	0	9th	Extra-parliamentary

== See also ==
- Liberalism in Costa Rica
