= Palmichal =

District in Acosta canton, San José province, Costa Rica

- District
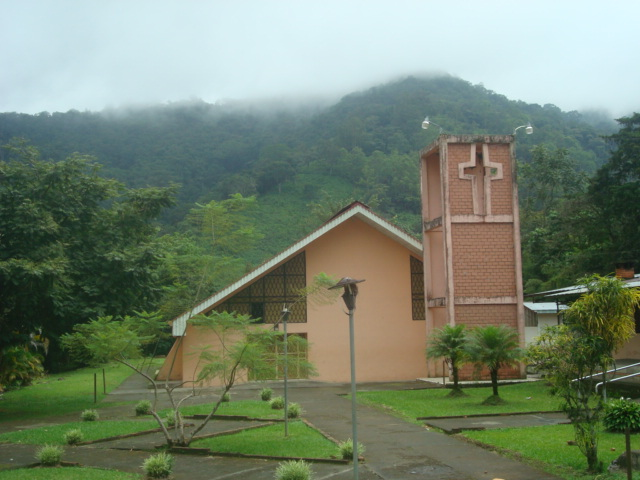
- Palmichal Church, Acosta, Costa Rica
- Palmichal district
- Palmichal district location in Costa Rica
- Coordinates: 9.8344113°N 84.1794108°W
- Country: Costa Rica
- Province: San José
- Canton: Acosta

Area
  - Total: 34.17 km^{2} (13.19 sq mi)
- Elevation: 1,097 m (3,599 ft)

Population (2011)
  - Total: 4,581
  - Density: 134.1/km^{2} (347.2/sq mi)
- Time zone: UTC−06:00
- Postal code: 11203

Palmichal is a district of the Acosta canton, in the San José province of Costa Rica.

== Geography ==
Palmichal has an area of 34.17 km^{2} and an elevation of 1,097 metres.

Tabarcia River, one of the main tributaries of Parrita River basin, originates at the mountains of San Pablo town, located in this district. This water springs of San Pablo are a relevant tourist attraction in Palmichal district, along with coffee and citric plantations nearby.

== Demographics ==
Historical population
Census	Pop.	±% p.a.
1892	227	—
1927	1,102	+4.62%
1950	1,886	+2.36%
1963	2,536	+2.30%
1973	2,270	−1.10%
1984	2,691	+1.56%
2000	3,852	+2.27%
2011	4,581	+1.59%
2022	5,878	+2.29%
Source: Instituto Nacional de Estadística y Censos; Centro Centroamericano de Población

For the 2011 census, Palmichal had a population of 4,581 inhabitants.

== Transportation ==
=== Road transportation ===
The district is covered by the following road routes:

- National Route 209
