= Guaitil District =

District in Acosta canton, San José province, Costa Rica

Guaitil
- District
- Interactive map of Guaitil
- Guaitil district location in Costa Rica
- Coordinates: 9.7923489°N 84.2531041°W
- Country: Costa Rica
- Province: San José
- Canton: Acosta

Area
  - Total: 43.85 km^{2} (16.93 sq mi)
- Elevation: 1,030 m (3,380 ft)

Population (2011)
  - Total: 2,406
  - Density: 54.87/km^{2} (142.1/sq mi)
- Time zone: UTC−06:00
- Postal code: 11202

Guaitil is a district of the Acosta canton, in the San José province of Costa Rica.

== Geography ==
Guaitil has an area of 43.85 km^{2} and an elevation of 1,030 metres.

The southern boundary of the district is the Grande de Candelaria River, and the northern boundary is the Jorco River.

== Communities ==
Within Guaitil District are the villages of Coyolar, La Cruz, Ococa, and Toledo.

== Demographics ==
Historical population
Census	Pop.	±% p.a.
1883	507	—
1892	474	−0.75%
1927	1,515	+3.38%
1950	2,430	+2.08%
1963	2,368	−0.20%
1973	2,265	−0.44%
1984	2,196	−0.28%
2000	2,555	+0.95%
2011	2,406	−0.54%
2022	2,769	+1.29%
Source: Instituto Nacional de Estadística y Censos; Centro Centroamericano de Población

For the 2011 census, Guaitil had a population of 2,406 inhabitants.

bus, also 4x4 vehicles preferable
