= 2022 Costa Rican general election =

- 6 February 2022 (first round); 3 April 2022 (second round)
- Opinion polls
- Presidential election
- Registered: 3,541,910
- Turnout: 59.97% (first round) ▼5.73pp 56.79% (second round) ▼9.66pp
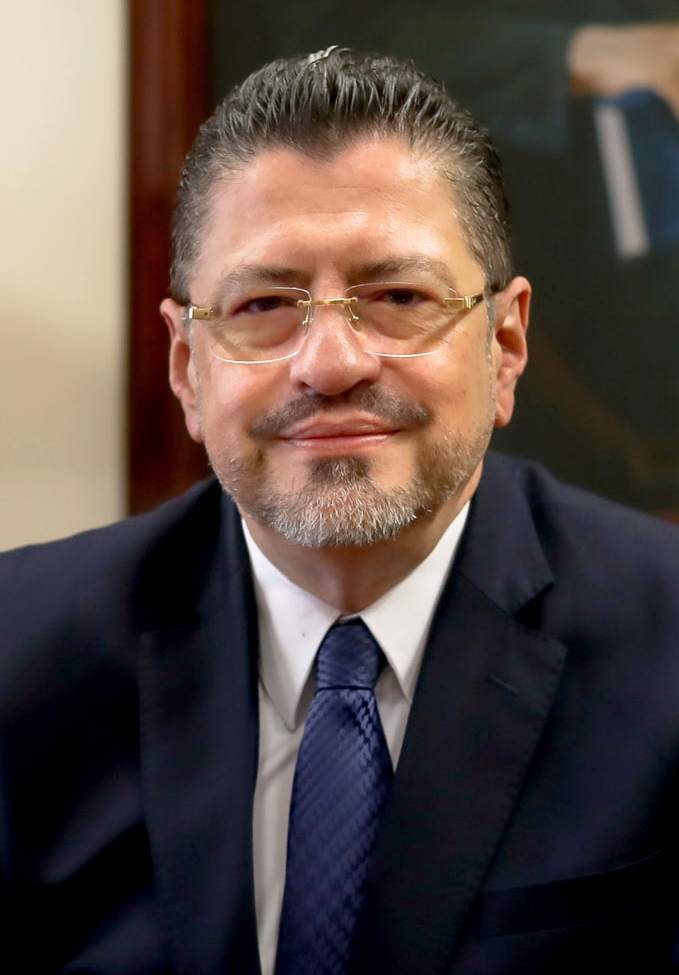

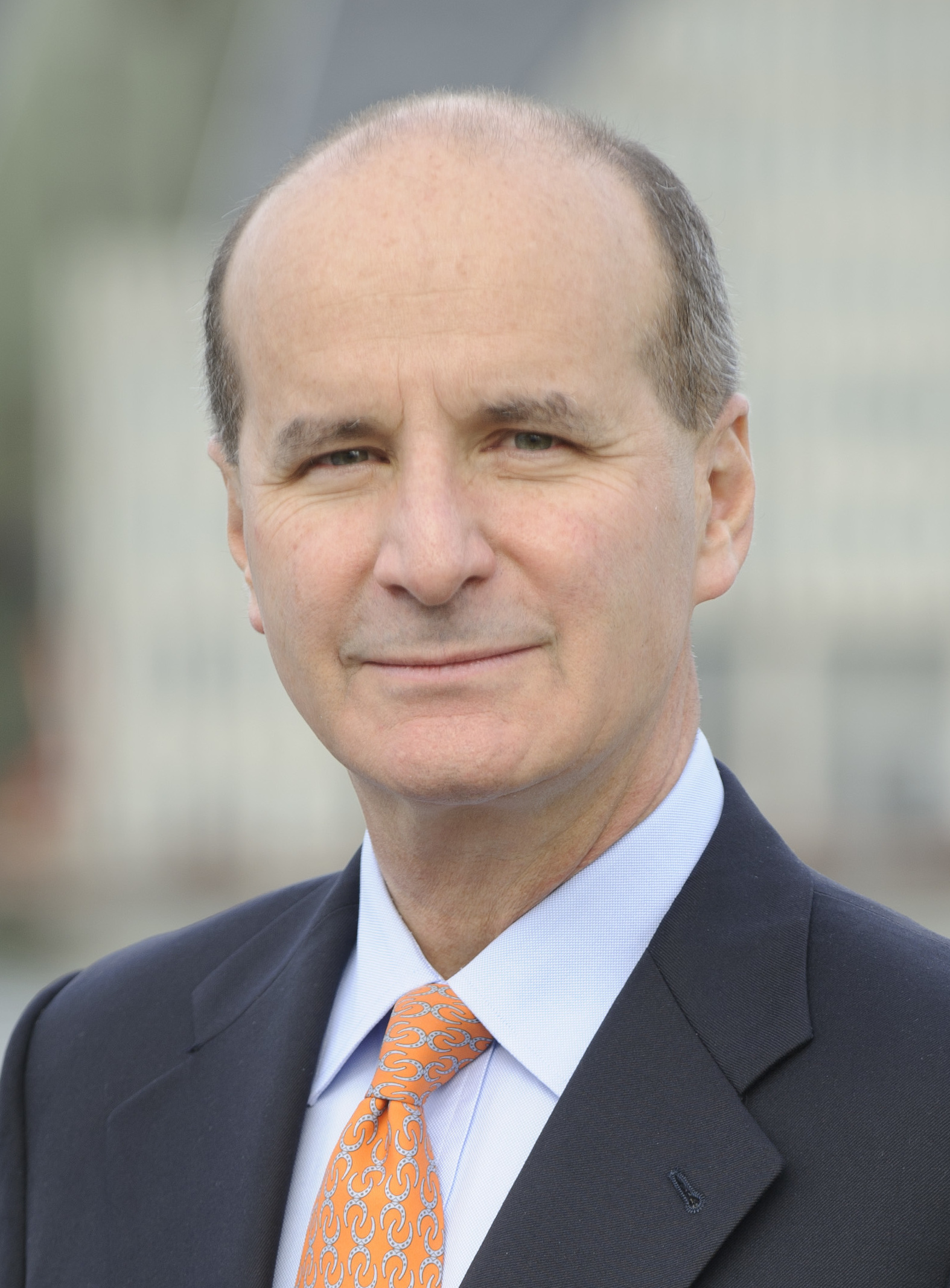
Nominee	Rodrigo Chaves	José María Figueres
Party	PPSD	PLN
Running mate	Stephan Brunner; Mary Munive	Álvaro Ramírez; Laura Arguedas
Popular vote	1,035,388	924,699
Percentage	52.82%	47.18%
- Chaves: 20-30% 30-40% 40-50% 50-60% 60-70% 70-80% Figueres: 20-30% 30-40% 40-50% 50-60% 60-70% 70-80% Alvarado: 20-30% 30-40% 40-50% Feinzaig: 30-40% Saborío: 20-30% 30-40% 40-50% Tie: 30-40% 50%
President before election
Carlos Alvarado Quesada
PAC
Elected President
Rodrigo Chaves Robles
PPSD
- Legislative election
- All 57 seats in the Legislative Assembly; 29 seats needed for a majority
- Turnout: 60.65% (▼4.91pp)
Party	Leader	Vote %	Seats	+/–
PLN	José María Figueres	24.82	19	+2
PPSD	Rodrigo Chaves Robles	15.04	10	New
PUSC	Lineth Saborío Chaverri	11.41	9	0
PNR	Fabricio Alvarado Muñoz	10.07	7	+7
PLP	Eliécer Feinzaig Mintz	9.06	6	+6
FA	José María Villalta	8.33	6	+5
This lists parties that won seats. See the complete results below.
Results by province

General elections were held in Costa Rica on 6 February 2022, to elect the president, two vice-presidents, and all 57 deputies of the Legislative Assembly. As none of the presidential nominees obtained at least 40% of the votes, a runoff was held on 3 April 2022, between the top two candidates, José María Figueres and Rodrigo Chaves Robles.

Rodrigo Chaves Robles of the Social Democratic Progress Party, a former official of the World Bank and former Minister of Finance with an anti-establishment reputation, received 53% of the vote in the run-off ballot and was declared president-elect by the Electoral Tribunal. Rival candidate and former president José Maria Figueres of the National Liberation Party received 47% of the vote and conceded defeat.

== Electoral system ==
The President of Costa Rica is elected using a modified two-round system in which a candidate must receive at least 40% of the vote to win in the first round; if no candidate wins in the first round, a runoff is held between the two candidates with most votes.

The 57 members of the Legislative Assembly are elected using closed list proportional representation through the largest remainder method from seven multi-member constituencies with between four and 19 seats, which are based on the seven provinces. Party lists were required to alternate between male and female candidates, with parties also required to have three or four of their seven regional lists headed by a female candidate.

== Background ==
In the previous election, a second electoral round was held, as neither political party had obtained 40% of the vote. This was only the third time in history that a second round had been held. The two candidates with the most support were the then-deputy, journalist, preacher, and Christian music singer Fabricio Alvarado Muñoz of the conservative National Restoration party, and the former Minister of Labor, journalist and writer Carlos Alvarado Quesada of the ruling Citizens' Action. The election was marked by social and religious issues that included issues such as same-sex marriage, the secular state, and sex education. Carlos Alvarado was the winner in the second round by a wide margin.

The Constitution of Costa Rica prohibits the incumbent president from serving consecutive terms, making incumbent president Carlos Alvarado Quesada ineligible to run in 2022. Additionally, government ministers and the directors or managers of autonomous institutions must resign twelve months before the election is held if they wish to run for the presidency or vice-presidency.

== Candidates ==
=== Presidential candidates ===
The Supreme Electoral Court approved twenty-five parties and their nominated candidates for the presidency. The ballot printing process started in December 2021, with the candidates shown on the following table.

2022 Presidential candidates
Party	Ideology	Ticket		
Party	Ideology	President	1st Vice President	2nd Vice President
A Just Costa Rica	Christian democracy	Rolando Araya Monge	Orlando Guerrero Vargas	Ana Lupita Mora Chinchilla
Accessibility without Exclusion Party	Disabled rights	Óscar López Arias	Isabel Ramírez Castro	Víctor López Jiménez
Broad Front	Democratic socialism	José María Villalta Flórez-Estrada	Patricia Mora Castellanos	Gerardo Hernández Naranjo
Citizens' Action Party	Social democracy	Welmer Ramos González	Emilia Molina Cruz	Sebastián Urbina Cañas
Christian Democratic Alliance	Conservatism	Christian Rivera Paniagua	Jessie Murillo Moya	David Alfaro Mata
Costa Rican Democratic Union	Centrism	Maricela Morales Mora	Braunio Rosales Ureña	Anais Sequeira Vega
Costa Rican Social Democratic Movement	Social democracy	Roulan Jiménez Chavarría	Carmen Pérez Ramírez	Édgar Rodríguez Ramírez
Costa Rican Social Justice Party	Social democracy	Carmen Quesada Santamaría	Walter Quesada Fernández	Maribel Vallejos Vallejos
Progressive Liberal Party	Liberalism	Eliécer Feinzaig Mintz	José Miguel Aguilar Berrocal	Rocío Briceño López
Liberal Union Party	Paleolibertarianism	Federico Malavassi Calvo	Luis Guillermo Lépiz Solano	Cohymbra Sáenz Carazo
Libertarian Movement Party	Libertarian conservatism	Luis Alberto Cordero Arias	Rocío Solís Gamboa	Royner Mora Ruiz
National Encounter Party	Agrarian populism	Óscar Campos Chavarría	Verónica Esquivel Campos	Juan Luis Sáenz Ruiz
National Force Party	Populism	Greivin Moya Carpio	Natalia Mora Escalante	Alberto Rodríguez Baldí
National Integration Party	Social conservatism	Walter Múñoz Céspedes	Ileana Vargas González	Luis Fernando Astorga Gatjens
National Liberation Party	Social democracy	José María Figueres	Álvaro Ramírez Bogantes	Laura Arguedas Mejía
National Restoration Party	Conservatism	Eduardo Cruickshank Smith	Xiomara Rodríguez Hernández	Leticia Arguedas Solís
New Generation Party	Conservatism	Sergio Mena Díaz	Shirley Díaz Mejías	Édgar Evans Meza
New Republic Party	Conservatism	Fabricio Alvarado Muñoz	Francisco Prendas Rodríguez	Alexandra Loría Beeche
Our People Party	Christian left	Rodolfo Piza Rocafort	Román Navarro Fallas	Vanessa Calvo González
Social Christian Republican Party	Christian democracy	Rodolfo Hernández Gómez	Lorena Solano Villaverde	Giovanni Rodríguez Solís
Social Christian Unity Party	Christian democracy	Lineth Saborío Chaverri	Franco Pacheco Arce	Gabriela de San Román Aguilar
Social Democratic Progress Party	Liberalism	Rodrigo Chaves Robles	Stephan Brunner Neibig	Mary Munive Angermüller
United People	Communism	Martín Chinchilla Castro	Andrea Cordero Vargas	Marco Castillo Rojas
United We Can	Classical liberalism	Natalia Díaz Quintana	Ileana González Cordero	José Alberto Grillo Rosanía
Workers' Party	Trotskyism	Jhonn Vega Masís	Jessica Barquero Barrantes	Greivis González López

=== Declined party inscriptions ===
- Costa Rican Renewal Party: Nominated Camilo Rodríguez Chaverri for the presidency, but their documentation was incomplete and the party was not allowed to run.
- Democratic Force: Former Libertarian vice presidential candidate and television presenter Viviam Quesada also announced her presidential candidacy through Democratic Force. The party was the only that submitted the documentation on physical paper printouts, and some of the required documentation was missing so the party was not allowed to run.

== Primaries and party conferences ==
=== Citizens' Action Party ===
The National Assembly of the Citizen Action Party held face-to-face assemblies, between April and July, to renew its structures in the country's cantons and provinces.

Lawmaker Welmer Ramos was elected in the primaries, winning by a narrow margin over fellow deputy Carolina Hidalgo and former Sports Minister Hernán Solano.

=== National Liberation Party ===
The National Liberation Party, the main opposition force, held its primary, known as the National Liberation Convention, on 6 June 2021, electing former President José María Figueres Olsen as a nominee. Political scientist Claudio Alpízar Otoya, former deputy and two-time presidential candidate Rolando Araya Monge, and Carlos Benavides Jiménez and Roberto Thompson Chacón, deputies for the 2018–2022 period, also participated in this process. Rolando Araya Monge quit the National Liberation Party and joined A Just Costa Rica as the presidential candidate.

=== Social Christian Unity Party ===
The Social Christian Unity Party held its National Convention on 27 June 2021. Erwen Masís Castro and Pedro Muñoz Fonseca, deputies for the 2018–2022 period, and the former vice president (2002–2006) Lineth Saborío Chaverri, participated in the process, and Saborío was elected as the presidential candidate.

=== Other parties/coalitions ===
Several former candidates who participated in the process have already announced their interest in being candidates again. Notably, in most cases, these candidates resigned from the parties for which they tried to obtain the presidency and began the processes of founding new political groups.

- A Just Costa Rica: Independent deputy Dragos Dolanescu Valenciano announced the creation of a new political formation called A Just Costa Rica after his departure from the Social Christian Republican Party following an accusation lodged by the party authorities against him for corruption. Although he announced that he would be measuring the popular support for a possible candidacy Rolando Araya Monge was selected as the presidential candidate for the party; he finished in second place in the PLN primary.
- Costa Rican Social Democratic Movement: Physician Roulan Jiménez Chavarría will run for president together with Rubén Vargas, a taxi service representative.
- Social Democratic Progress: The former Minister of Finance of the Alvarado Quesada administration and former World Bank official, Rodrigo Chaves Robles, has held meetings with different sectors and representatives of seven political parties, including the Republican Social Christian and National Integration parties to propose a programmatic proposal and a possible electoral coalition in which, presumably, he could be the candidate. According to Chaves, "I've told them that, first of all, you cannot talk about a long trip if you do not have a vehicle. Secondly, you can much less talk about the driver of a vehicle that does not exist. But I agree with them that in this country, approximately 60 percent of the voters do not find representation in any of the existing parties or feel the need to support them." Chaves affirmed at the end of February 2021 that there are seven participating parties, three already registered: Republican Social Christian, National Integration (with parliamentary representation) and Social Democratic Progress Party, alongside four in the process of registration: United for Costa Rica, Our Town and the Costa Rican Pacific Union and that they have not defined the candidates for president and vice-presidents. At the end of May, the Republican Social Christian Party and Chaves announced their separation, affirming ideological incompatibilities and breach of agreements, including the candidacy of two-time Republican candidate Rodolfo Hernández for deputy for San José. In July, Chaves announced his candidacy with the recently founded Social Democratic Progress Party.
- Liberal Union: Former Libertarian Movement leader Otto Guevara left the Libertarian Movement after the party went bankrupt and in economic disarray, and founded the Liberal Union Party. The former deputy and former Libertarian presidential candidate Federico Guillermo Malavassi Calvo announced his presidential nomination with Guevara as deputy candidate on the party list.
- Libertarian Movement: Lawyer and financier with a neoliberal tendency, Carlos Valenciano Kamer, known for suing Célimo Guido during the demonstrations of the National Rescue Movement at the end of 2020, was announced as a candidate by the libertarian party, but he quit some months after. The party nominated Luis Alberto Cordero Arias as the presidential candidate.
- National Encounter: Former deputy Óscar Campos, organizer of blockades and protests against the government in 2018, founded this party.
- National Restoration: This party, that held an important role in the last election, nominated the former president of the Legislative Assembly, Eduardo Cruickshank.
- New Generation Party: Sergio Mena Díaz would be repeating for the third time the presidential candidacy with a double nomination for deputy also for the third time for New Generation.
- New Republic: Fabricio Alvarado, who was the first place of the first round and runner-up of the previous election, announced his separation from the party for which he was a deputy and candidate, and create the New Republic Party, although he assures that this would be a secular and non-Christian party unlike its predecessor.
- Our People: The former Minister of the Presidency of Costa Rica and former candidate (twice) of the Social Christian Unity Party Rodolfo Piza Rocafort announced that he would be participating but this time for the Our People Party, a provincial party in the process of being constituted on a national scale. Our People Party was a provincial political party founded mostly by former Social Christian Unity Party members and converted to the national level.
- Social Christian Republican Party: The party considered the former minister Rodrigo Chaves as presidential candidate and also former President Rafael Ángel Calderón Fournier was asked to run, but he declined, arguing for health reasons. Nomination finally went to three-time candidate Rodolfo Hernández who was also a candidate in 2014 and 2018.
- United We Can: Natalia Díaz Quintana, former deputy and former presidential candidate within the Libertarian Movement created a new liberal party called United We Can. Díaz had previously resigned from the Libertarian Movement and even gave her adhesion to the candidate of the National Liberation Party Antonio Álvarez Desanti in the 2018 election. Diaz was ratified as presidential nominee on 26 June.

=== Failed coalitions proposal ===
As of the legal deadline for the inscription of alliances, 8 August 2021, no party entered a coalition, but some attempts were made by some of the right-wing parties.

==== Attempted coalitions ====
At the beginning of 2020, the presidents of Social Christian Unity Party, Christian Democratic Alliance and Liberal Union began negotiations for the creation of a conservative-liberal right-wing coalition with the self-proclaimed goal of preventing a third government of the Citizen Action Party. Although Natalia Díaz Quintana of Unidos Podemos was invited, she declined to participate, preferring to fight the elections alone. The participation of Eliécer Feinzaig Mintz of the Progressive Liberal Party in the negotiations was reported in principle, but their representatives later denied it.

The proposal for a Christian-liberal coalition was also promoted by former Social Christian president Miguel Ángel Rodríguez Echeverría. However, the proposal was rejected in the National Assembly of the Social Christian Unity Party.

==== Coalition for Change ====
On 21 June 2021, Cartago mayor Mario Redondo Poveda and former Deputy Minister of Transportation Eliécer Feinzaig Mintz, respectively the presidents of the Christian Democratic Alliance and Progressive Liberal Party, announced the "Coalition for Change". This would be the first coalition of right-wing parties to participate in a presidential election since the Unity Coalition in 1978, and the first overall since United Left in 2006.

On 25 June Redondo individually abandoned the Coalition due to questionings after it was made public that he held secret meetings with one of the companies involved in the Cochinilla judicial case scandal.

=== Personalities that attempted to run ===
- Juan Diego Castro Fernández: One of the first to make the announcement was criminal lawyer and former Justice Minister Juan Diego Castro, who announced the creation of a new party called "Reconstruction" after his unfriendly break with the National Integration Party. Castro announced in January 2021, he was cancelling the process of forming the party due to difficulties in the registration process, formally requesting the Supreme Electoral Tribunal for the filing. In 2021 Castro Fernández confirmed to Teletica that he would be a presidential candidate for the second time, although he did not clarify by which group, assuring that he is evaluating being one by a party or coalition. He only completely ruled out the return to being one by National Integration, from which he had an unfriendly exit.

== Campaign ==
Voters' concerns included high unemployment (nearly 20 percent), rising costs of living, corruption and, to a lesser extent, immigration.

The Citizens' Action Party, in power since 2014, has become largely unpopular and suffers from internal divisions. Its candidate, Welmer Ramos, had only low voting intentions in the opinion polls.

Fabricio Alvarado ran again. Supported by conservative evangelicals, he focused his campaign on societal issues, denouncing "gender ideology" in education and alleged infringements on religious freedoms. He promised not to raise taxes and was expected to benefit from the resentment of some Costa Ricans towards traditional political parties, which some consider corrupt.

José María Figueres, the candidate of the National Liberation Party, was president from 1994 to 1998 and is the son of José Figueres Ferrer, who was president several times. In office, he eliminated social welfare programs. He promised economic reforms, including pension reform, to reduce the deficit and unemployment. He also proposed to encourage the oil industry. However, he was weakened by a corruption case dating back to 2004.

Rodrigo Chaves Robles, the candidate of the Social Democratic Progress Party, served as Minister Of Finance from 2019 to 2020. As part of his campaign, he sought to combat corruption by punishing those who do not report acts of misconduct. He stated he was in favor of transparency between the government and the press, universities and citizens, and he planned to foster it through a daily report of the activities carried out by public institutions. His plan regarding unemployment involved encouraging more women to join the workforce and to raise the number of STEM graduates in response to the growing demand. He also supported bilingual education and welcomed foreign businesses in Costa Rica. To top off his campaign, he proposed a five-step plan to lower the cost of living. The five step plan was removing taxes from basic food and household items, lowering the price of rice, lowering the price of electricity, eliminating monopolies and supporting farmers to import more efficient agrochemicals.

Lineth Saborio, supported by the centre-right Social Christian Unity Party, was vice-president of Costa Rica from 2002 to 2006 under President Abel Pacheco. Her proposals included reducing taxes and defending the agreement with the International Monetary Fund (IMF) signed by the government.

José María Villalta represented the Broad Front left-wing coalition. He emphasized the fight against climate change, workers' rights and social programs. He advocated for tax reform, a sharp increase in social spending, strengthening labor rights, energy transition and defense of LGBTQ rights. He was heavily attacked for his support of Nicaragua and Venezuela.

== Themes ==
=== Social ===
==== COVID-19 pandemic ====
The COVID-19 pandemic, which, as of February 2021, has resulted in more than 2,800 deaths in Costa Rica, has had significant socioeconomic effects in the country that were expected to influence the presidential elections. An example is unemployment, which, influenced by the effects of the pandemic, increased to 21.9% by October 2020.4 According to a study by the Center for Research and Political Studies (CIEP) of the University of Costa Rica, 27.45% of the 877 people consulted in the study throughout the national territory identified unemployment as the main problem in the country in the context of the pandemic.

==== Popular protests ====
One of the most controversial aspects of the Alvarado Quesada administration was the approval by the Legislative Assembly of the Law for the Strengthening of Public Finances, popularly known as the Fiscal Plan, which was opposed by both the right and the left, but it was supported by the benches of the majority parties; PLN, PAC and PUSC (ranging from center-right to center-left). Opposition to the project led to the 2018 Costa Rican union strike, one of the largest in recent history, but which did not have the effect of stopping the project.

The opposition to the tax reform, however, generated future protests coupled with other issues of discontent from specific sectors. In mid-2019, protests were raised by fishermen, truck drivers and high school students, the latter calling for the resignation of the Minister of Education Edgar Mora and closing national roads. The students demanded, among other things, the end of the FARO tests and the reestablishment of the traditional high school tests, improvement in infrastructure and the departure of Mora, who effectively resigned on 2 July 2019. The protests were supported by allies as dissimilar as the union movements traditionally associated with the left of leaders such as the unionist Albino Vargas as well as the ultra-conservative neo-Pentecostal political movement led by the presidential candidate Fabricio Alvarado and by far-right movements.

=== Migration and xenophobia ===
The first potential candidate to make the issue of migration his own was Sergio Mena Díaz of the right-wing extra-parliamentary New Generation party, who, among other things, proposes to reform the Constitution to eliminate ius soli (birthright citizenship, which allows anyone to be Costa Rican by birth by being born in Costa Rican territory). The bill earned Mena harsh criticism who was even accused of being a "fascist" by the left-wing deputy José María Villalta.

=== Cannabis legalization ===
In April 2021, the parliamentary caucus of the Citizen's Action Party proposed through a bill the legalization of the production, consumption and sale of cannabis and its derivatives, including for recreational use and not just medicinal. Conservative legislators opposed the measure. If approved, the bill would establish the power of the ministries of Health, Agriculture and Livestock, Economy, Industry and Commerce and Foreign Trade to regulate production, transformation, industrialization and commercialization activities, and It would give the government the power to issue licenses for production and commercialization as well as possible closures.

=== Corruption ===
On 17 February 2020, the Alvarado government created the Presidential Data Analysis Unit (UPAD) through decree number 41996-MP-Mideplan, the same office that would be quickly dissolved days later, on 23 February, due to its controversial origins, performance and goals. The UPAD requested personal information about citizens from different government entities since 2019, so the Legislative Assembly initiated an investigation on 26 February 2020. On 28 February 2020, the Office of the Attorney General of the Republic carried out a search of a Presidential House where he collects electronic devices as evidence, including President Carlos Alvarado's cell phone and laptop.

During 2021, it was discovered that since 2015 an alleged organized drug trafficking group had meetings at the legislative headquarters with some thirteen legislators and former legislators in their offices.

On Monday, 14 June 2021, the Judicial Investigation Agency carried out 57 raids on homes, construction companies and government institutions, including the second raid on the Presidential House during the Carlos Alvarado administration, in which documents were confiscated, and 30 people were arrested. The investigation was nicknamed the Caso Cochinilla (Woodlouse case) in reference to the parasite.

This judicial investigation case revolves around a network of corruption and bribery between construction companies (MECO, H Solís, Montedes and others) and officials of the National Council of Roads (Conavi), the entity in charge of the development of highways in the country, which publishes the contracting posters and administers their tenders. President Alvarado ordered a full investigation of the Ministry and suspended all contracts with the involved companies.

== Results ==
=== President ===
Candidate	Party	First round		Second round	
Candidate	Party	Votes	%	Votes	%
José María Figueres Olsen	National Liberation Party	571,518	27.28	924,699	47.18
Rodrigo Chaves Robles	Social Democratic Progress Party	351,453	16.78	1,035,388	52.82
Fabricio Alvarado Muñoz	New Republic Party	311,633	14.88		
Eliécer Feinzaig Mintz	Progressive Liberal Party	259,788	12.40		
Lineth Saborío Chaverri	Social Christian Unity Party	259,767	12.40		
José María Villalta Flórez-Estrada	Broad Front	182,789	8.73		
Rolando Araya Monge	A Just Costa Rica	19,951	0.95		
Greivin Moya Carpio	National Force Party	16,576	0.79		
Natalia Díaz Quintana	United We Can	16,496	0.79		
Welmer Ramos González	Citizens' Action Party	13,803	0.66		
Óscar López Arias	Accessibility without Exclusion Party	12,418	0.59		
Rodolfo Hernández Gómez	Social Christian Republican Party	12,224	0.58		
Sergio Mena Díaz	New Generation Party	11,643	0.56		
Eduardo Cruickshank Smith	National Restoration Party	11,160	0.53		
Carmen Quesada Santamaría	Costa Rican Social Justice Party	6,759	0.32		
Federico Malavassi Calvo	Liberal Union Party	6,633	0.32		
Maricela Morales Mora	Costa Rican Democratic Union	6,604	0.32		
Christian Rivera Paniagua	Christian Democratic Alliance	5,697	0.27		
Óscar Campos Chavarría	National Encounter Party	4,639	0.22		
Rodolfo Piza Rocafort	Our People Party	3,359	0.16		
Walter Múñoz Céspedes	National Integration Party	3,022	0.14		
Roulan Jiménez Chavarría	Costa Rican Social Democratic Movement	2,032	0.10		
Jhon Vega Masís	Workers' Party	1,951	0.09		
Martín Chinchilla Castro	United People	1,495	0.07		
Luis Alberto Cordero Arias	Libertarian Movement	1,406	0.07		
Total		2,094,816	100.00	1,960,087	100.00
Valid votes		2,094,816	98.62	1,960,087	97.45
Invalid votes		17,665	0.83	7,758	0.39
Blank votes		11,607	0.55	43,621	2.17
Total votes		2,124,088	100.00	2,011,466	100.00
Registered voters/turnout		3,541,910	59.97	3,541,913	56.79
Source: Tribunal Supremo de Elecciones

==== By province ====
First round

Province	PLN %	PPSD %	PNR %	PUSC %	PLP+ %	FA %	CRJ %	UP %	PFN %	PAC %	PNG %	Other %
San José	28.05	15.88	12.24	11.18	15.58	9.81	0.84	0.81	0.69	0.69	0.62	3.61
Alajuela	27.32	21.92	14.84	11.00	11.00	7.18	1.01	0.63	0.57	0.56	0.68	3.29
Cartago	30.03	13.49	8.97	15.35	13.60	10.05	0.78	1.15	1.06	0.65	0.52	4.35
Heredia	26.53	16.65	11.10	11.35	17.28	10.29	0.94	0.92	0.62	0.73	0.57	3.02
Guanacaste	28.29	16.73	17.62	16.17	5.89	6.09	1.08	0.91	1.15	0.91	0.59	4.57
Puntarenas	25.15	16.57	25.47	13.56	3.87	6.70	0.96	0.59	0.85	0.65	0.55	5.08
Limón	21.07	11.84	29.89	14.19	4.24	6.76	1.52	0.88	1.24	0.47	0.58	7.32
Total	27.28	16.72	14.79	12.36	12.33	8.70	0.95	0.82	0.78	0.66	0.60	4.01
Source: TSE

Second round

Province	PPSD %	PLN %
San José	48.82	51.18
Alajuela	56.48	43.52
Cartago	47.89	52.11
Heredia	51.43	48.57
Guanacaste	55.49	44.51
Puntarenas	60.62	39.38
Limón	62.87	37.13
Total	52.85	47.15
Source: TSE

==== Abroad vote ====
First round

Abroad vote
1. PLN (26.2%)
2. PLP (21.2%)
3. FA (16.8%)
4. PPSD (14.8%)
5. PUSC (8.84%)
6. PNR (6.34%)
7. PAC (1.61%)
8. CRJ (0.74%)
9. UP (0.61%)

Country	PLN %	PPSD %	PNR %	PUSC %	PLP+ %	FA %	CRJ %	UP %	PFN %	PAC %	PNG %	Other %
Germany	9.62	7.29	0.58	4.08	25.66	50.15	0.29	0.29	-	1.17	-	0.87
Argentina	16.36	7.27	3.64	3.64	20.00	41.82	-	-	-	7.27	-	-
Austria	15.87	4.76	1.59	4.76	31.75	34.92	-	-	-	3.17	-	3.18
Belgium	12.86	7.14	-	22.86	30.00	21.43	-	-	-	2.86	-	2.86
Brazil	46.15	15.38	-	7.69	30.77	-	-	-	-	-	-	-
Canada	16.06	13.87	6.57	15.33	28.47	10.95	-	1.46	0.73	1.46	0.73	4.37
Chile	25.26	17.89	6.32	7.37	17.89	16.84	1.05	-	1.05	2.11	-	3.16
China	34.78	4.35	-	-	30.43	21.74	-	-	-	8.70	-	-
Colombia	33.73	8.43	6.02	2.41	25.30	16.87	-	2.41	-	1.20	2.41	1.20
South Korea	30.77	7.69	11.54	3.85	11.54	26.92	-	-	-	-	-	7.69
Cuba	44.44	11.11	11.11	11.11	11.11	11.11	-	-	-	-	-	11.11
Ecuador	12.50	31.25	6.25	-	12.50	15.63	-	-	-	-	-	18.75
United States	27.06	20.09	9.08	9.86	18.50	9.53	1.04	0.52	0.41	1.26	0.33	2.32
El Salvador	32.81	10.94	9.38	15.63	17.19	6.25	-	1.56	-	1.56	-	4.69
Spain	27.50	8.44	0.63	6.88	24.38	26.88	0.31	0.63	-	2.19	-	2.18
France	17.37	5.26	2.63	3.68	14.74	47.89	1.05	-	0.53	4.74	-	1.58
Guatemala	32.69	19.23	8.17	8.17	17.79	9.62	0.48	1.44	-	0.48	0.48	1.44
Honduras	47.89	12.68	2.82	15.49	14.08	5.63	-	-	-	1.41	-	-
Israel	21.43	10.71	-	3.57	53.57	7.14	3.57	-	-	-	-	-
Italy	24.36	2.56	5.13	8.97	23.08	26.92	1.28	-	-	5.13	-	2.56
Japan	6.45	16.13	6.45	3.23	32.26	19.35	-	-	-	6.45	-	9.68
Mexico	32.69	12.69	3.46	10.38	21.54	16.92	-	0.77	-	0.38	0.38	0.77
Nicaragua	40.49	8.59	14.11	13.50	12.27	5.52	1.23	-	0.61	0.61	1.23	1.23
Netherlands	20.12	10.65	3.55	2.96	30.18	24.85	1.18	-	-	2.96	-	3.55
Panama	34.95	13.98	5.78	13.68	22.80	4.26	0.91	1.22	-	-	0.61	1.82
Peru	26.56	14.06	7.81	9.38	14.06	17.19	-	-	-	-	1.56	7.81
United Kingdom	16.02	7.77	-	7.77	33.01	32.04	-	-	-	1.94	0.49	1.98
Dominican Republic	34.78	8.70	15.22	-	17.39	6.52	2.17	10.87	-	2.17	-	2.17
Russia	28.57	7.14	-	-	14.29	42.86	7.14	-	-	-	-	-
Singapore	36.36	9.09	-	18.18	9.09	-	-	-	18.18	-	-	9.09
Switzerland	24.85	9.47	2.37	4.73	29.59	26.04	0.59	-	-	1.18	-	1.18
Uruguay	17.65	5.88	11.76	5.88	23.53	29.41	-	-	-	-	-	5.88
India	-	-	-	100	-	-	-	-	-	-	-	-
Qatar	43.48	17.39	-	-	34.78	-	-	-	-	-	-	-
Bolivia	41.67	16.67	8.33	-	16.67	8.33	-	-	-	8.33	-	-
Paraguay	11.11	11.11	22.22	-	22.22	33.33	-	-	-	-	-	-
Australia	39.13	17.39	-	-	8.70	13.04	-	4.35	-	8.70	-	-
Jamaica	33.33	11.11	11.11	-	33.33	11.11	-	-	-	-	-	-
Turkey	75.00	-	-	-	-	25.00	-	-	-	-	-	-
UAE	8.00	20.00	-	4.00	44.00	8.00	-	-	-	-	-	-
Indonesia	33.33	-	-	33.33	33.33	-	-	-	-	-	-	-
Kenya	50.00	-	-	12.50	12.50	25.00	-	-	-	-	-	-
Total	26.17	14.77	6.34	8.84	21.22	16.83	0.74	0.61	0.27	1.61	0.32	2.28
Source: TSE

Second round

Abroad vote
1. PLN (59.0%)
2. PPSD (41.0%)

Country	PLN %	PPSD %
Germany	75.77	25.26
Argentina	68.57	31.43
Austria	80.00	20.00
Belgium	75.44	24.56
Brazil	84.21	15.79
Canada	40.91	59.09
Chile	63.89	36.11
China*	87.50	12.50
Colombia	76.00	24.00
South Korea	50.00	50.00
Cuba	85.71	14.29
Ecuador	65.63	34.38
United States	49.53	50.47
El Salvador	63.08	36.92
Spain	76.76	23.24
France	74.32	25.68
Guatemala	52.30	47.70
Honduras	68.66	31.34
Israel	71.43	28.57
Italy	75.00	25.00
Japan	57.69	42.31
Mexico	69.23	30.77
Nicaragua	67.48	32.52
Netherlands	61.54	38.46
Panama	62.93	37.07
Peru	62.26	37.74
United Kingdom	80.79	19.21
Dominican Republic	67.50	32.50
Russia	No election held	
Singapore	90.91	9.09
Switzerland	70.63	29.37
Uruguay	58.33	41.67
India	100.00	-
Qatar	77.27	22.73
Bolivia	50.00	50.00
Paraguay	60.00	40.00
Australia	41.18	58.82
Jamaica	100.00	-
Turkey	100.00	-
UAE	54.55	45.45
Indonesia	-	100.00
Kenya	75.00	25.00
Total	59.03	40.97
Source: TSE, CRHoy

=== Legislative Assembly ===
Party	Votes	%	Seats	+/–
National Liberation Party	515,231	24.82	19	+2
Social Democratic Progress Party	312,120	15.04	10	New
Social Christian Unity Party	236,941	11.41	9	0
New Republic Party	209,074	10.07	7	New
Progressive Liberal Party	188,074	9.06	6	+6
Broad Front	172,961	8.33	6	+5
Citizens' Action Party	44,622	2.15	0	–10
National Restoration Party	42,495	2.05	0	–14
New Generation Party	37,144	1.79	0	0
Accessibility without Exclusion Party	31,339	1.51	0	0
Social Christian Republican Party	31,227	1.50	0	–2
A Just Costa Rica	25,347	1.22	0	New
Liberal Union Party	24,645	1.19	0	New
National Force Party	24,518	1.18	0	New
National Integration Party	22,710	1.09	0	–4
United We Can	21,100	1.02	0	New
Christian Democratic Alliance	18,475	0.89	0	0
Costa Rican Social Justice Party	18,097	0.87	0	New
Libertarian Movement	13,473	0.65	0	0
Costa Rican Social Democratic Movement	11,602	0.56	0	New
National Encounter Party	10,536	0.51	0	New
Guanacastecan Union Party	10,086	0.49	0	0
Our People Party	9,240	0.45	0	New
Recovering Values Party	9,059	0.44	0	0
United People	6,102	0.29	0	New
Workers' Party	5,631	0.27	0	0
Costa Rican Democratic Union	5,318	0.26	0	New
Let's Go	5,205	0.25	0	0
We Are	3,997	0.19	0	New
Cartago Renewal Party	2,995	0.14	0	New
Let's Act Now (Actuemos Ya)	1,861	0.09	0	0
Costa Rican Anti-Corruption Party	1,768	0.09	0	New
United for Costa Rica Party	913	0.04	0	New
New Socialist Party of Cartago	837	0.04	0	New
New Socialist Party of San José	778	0.04	0	0
Costa Rican Left Party	351	0.02	0	New
Total	2,075,872	100.00	57	0
Valid votes	2,075,872	98.03		
Invalid votes	23,199	1.10		
Blank votes	18,431	0.87		
Total votes	2,117,502	100.00		
Registered voters/turnout	3,491,078	60.65		
Source: Tribunal Supremo de Elecciones

==== By constituency ====
Constituency	PLN		PPSD		PUSC		PNR		PLP+		FA		PAC		PREN		PNG		PRSC		PASE		Other	
Constituency	%	S	%	S	%	S	%	S	%	S	%	S	%	S	%	S	%	S	%	S	%	S	%	S
San José	24.25	5	17.05	4	9.50	2	9.08	2	11.73	3	10.14	3	1.89	0	1.41	0	1.26	0	1.15	0	1.79	0	10.75	0
Alajuela	26.40	3	18.73	2	11.44	2	10.90	2	8.60	1	6.63	1	1.78	0	1.65	0	1.00	0	1.82	0	1.06	0	9.99	0
Cartago	26.40	3	10.58	1	12.17	1	5.73	0	8.94	1	9.20	1	3.20	0	1.65	0	5.33	0	1.22	0	1.47	0	14.11	0
Heredia	25.92	2	13.91	1	10.98	1	8.37	0	12.76	1	10.57	1	2.31	0	2.20	0	1.16	0	0.87	0	1.58	0	9.37	0
Guanacaste	26.14	2	12.44	1	16.79	1	9.58	0	3.42	0	4.17	0	2.00	0	2.03	0	1.05	0	1.91	0	2.35	0	18.12	0
Puntarenas	23.08	2	11.48	1	13.59	1	16.88	1	2.61	0	5.35	0	2.71	0	4.72	0	2.37	0	2.73	0	0.68	0	13.80	0
Limón	20.22	2	8.23	0	13.07	1	15.75	2	2.30	0	5.07	0	2.19	0	4.08	0	2.53	0	1.81	0	1.33	0	23.42	0
Total	24.45	19	14.62	10	11.24	9	9.94	7	8.69	6	8.04	6	2.12	0	2.02	0	1.84	0	1.47	0	1.45	0	14.12	0
Source: TSE

== Aftermath ==
Rodrigo Chaves Robles of the Social Democratic Progress Party, a former official of the World Bank and former Minister of Finance with an anti-establishment reputation, won 52.9% of the votes in the run-off ballot, and was declared president-elect by the electoral tribunal. Rival candidate and former president José Maria Figueres of the National Liberation Party received 47.1% of the votes. Speaking to supporters in San José, Chaves said he accepted his victory with humility, and urged Figueres to help him move the country forward. Figueres quickly conceded defeat after results came in, telling supporters: "I congratulate Rodrigo Chaves, and I wish him the best." On Twitter, incumbent president Carlos Alvarado Quesada said he had called to congratulate Chaves and pledged an orderly handover of power.

=== Reactions ===
United States congratulated Rodrigo Chaves Robles on his election as Costa Rica's next president. In a statement, it added, "we also congratulate Costa Ricans for participating in and carrying out an electoral process consistent with Costa Rica's strong democratic traditions. Costa Rica represents a beacon of democracy in the Americas and the world, and our bilateral relations remain rooted in shared democratic values embracing freedom, inclusivity, and respect for human rights. We look forward to strengthening ties between our nations to advance common interests, including humane migration management, protecting the environment, and working with democratic partners in the region toward a more secure, prosperous, and democratic hemisphere."
