= Dragos Dolanescu Valenciano =

Costa Rican politician

Dragos Dolanescu
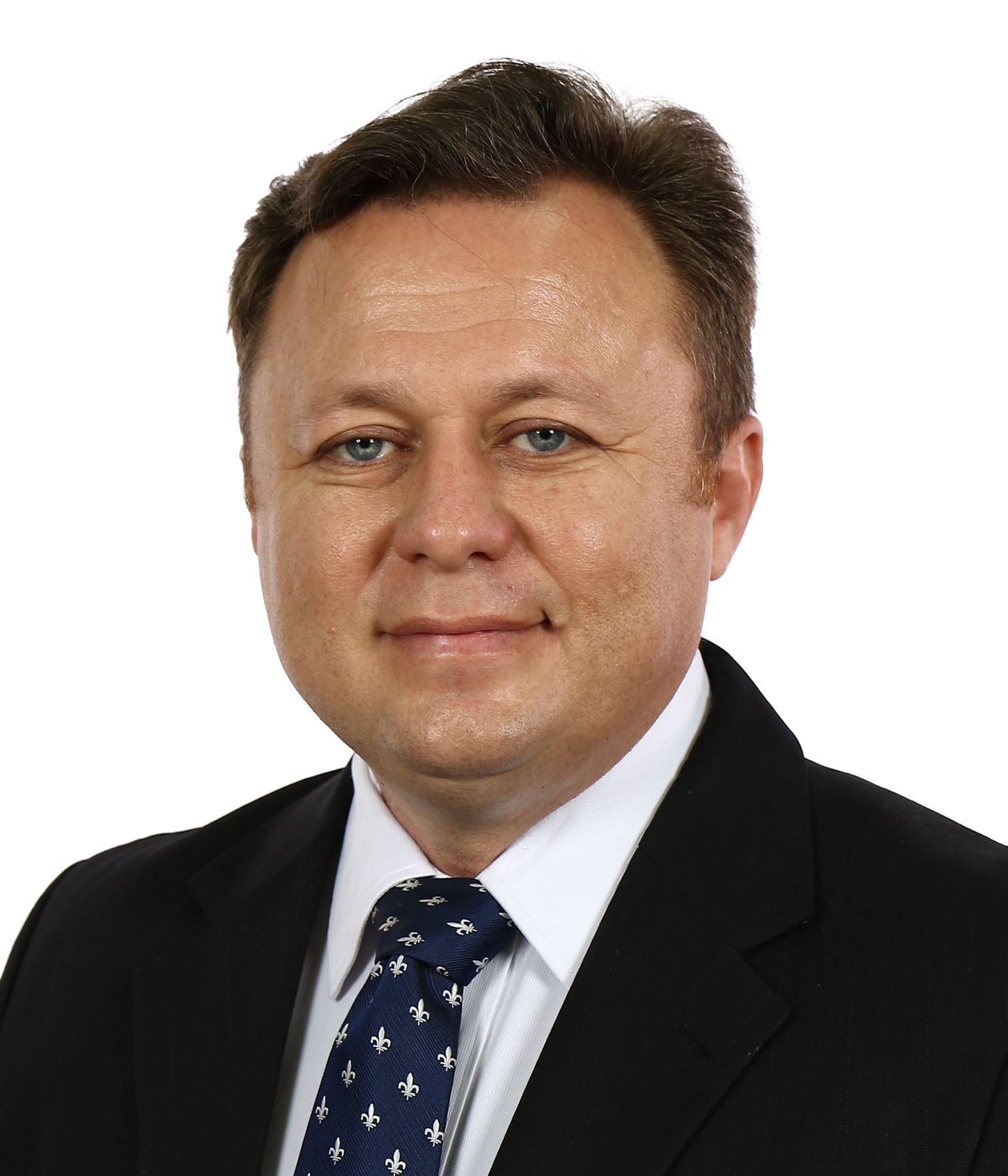
- Dolanescu's parliamentary photo.

Deputy of the Legislative Assembly of Costa Rica
- In office 1 May 2018 – 30 April 2022
- Preceded by: José Alberto Alfaro Jiménez
- Succeeded by: Priscilla Vindas Salazar
- Constituency: Alajuela

Personal details
- Born: Dragos Carlos Dolanescu Valenciano; 19 November 1975 (age 50) Bucharest, S.R. Romania
- Party: Costa Rica Justa (2021–present)
- Other political affiliations: Social Christian Republican Party (2014–2020); Social Christian Unity Party (before 2014)
- Education: University of Bucharest; University of Alcalá

Dragos Dolanescu Valenciano, known as Dragoș Dolănescu, (born November 19, 1975, in Bucharest, Socialist Republic of Romania) is a Costa Rican psychologist and politician. Dolanescu is an independent congressman in the third year of the 2018-2022 legislative period. He gained his seat at the Legislative Assembly running in the Alajuela province race for the Partido Republicano Social Cristiano party (PRSC), which at the time he was also president of the organization. He resigned to PRSC after clashing with senior members of the party, who accused him of fund mismanagement in the 2020 municipal elections in retaliation for his resignation.

== Early life ==
Dolanescu was born in Bucharest, Socialist Republic of Romania, to Romanian singer and politician Ion Dolănescu and Margarita Valenciano, a Costa Rican who studied medicine in Cluj-Napoca and Bucharest. Dolanescu studied psychology at the University of Bucharest, where he obtained his bachelor's degree and obtained a doctorate in medical psychology at the University of Alcalá de Henares,

== Political positions ==
Dragos Dolanescu is a conservative politician. He openly opposes free abortion in Costa Rica and same-sex marriage.

During his legislative tenure, Dolanescu has been a staunch opponent of President Carlos Alvarado Quesada and the Citizens' Action Party (PAC). The lawmaker opposed the approval of the Tax Reform, promoted the creation of a special investigative commission that would review the management of the finances of PAC during the 2010 presidential campaign, as well as the special investigative commission that would investigate the creation of a data analysis unit in the Presidential House, known as the UPAD.

Dolanescu signed the Madrid Charter, a document drafted by the far-right Spanish party Vox that describes left-wing groups as enemies of Ibero-America involved in a "criminal project" that are "under the umbrella of the Cuban regime".

== Controversy ==
Dolanescu has been singled out as a right-wing populist by his adversaries. Former president Rafael Ángel Calderón, founder of the party through which he was elected as a congressman, criticized him for this and assured that Dolanescu intends to be a presidential candidate to which Calderón said "he is not fit for it."

Dolanescu resigned from the PRSC and declared himself an independent lawmaker on July 10, 2020, alleging political differences with former Costa Rican president Rafael Ángel Calderón Fournier, honorary president of the Republican Party. In this same political event, Dolanescu also resigned as president of the PRSC during his second term. The event generated strong criticism from various members of the PRSC, including Calderón Fournier, who accused Dolanescu of being a populist and that his resignation from the party was due to his political aspirations. On July 9, one day before Dolanescu announced he would resign from PRSC, several members of the Republican Party, among them, congressman Otto Roberto Vargas Víquez and the former presidential candidates Rodolfo Hernández Gómez and Roberto Suñol, filed a complaint to the Supreme Electoral Tribunal (TSE) of Costa Rica1 based on a report from the party's fiscal office that questioned the way in which Dolanescu, as party president, handled finances during the 2020 municipal elections. The claim is under review in TSE.

Dolanescu announced he would form a new political party called A Just Costa Rica.
