= San Ignacio District, Acosta =

District in Acosta canton, San José province, Costa Rica

San Ignacio
- District
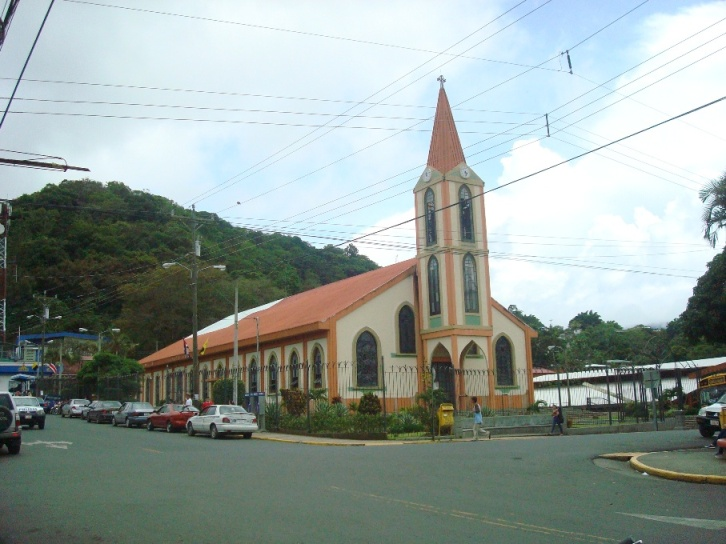
- Church of San Ignacio de Loyola, Acosta, Costa Rica.
- San Ignacio district
- San Ignacio district location in Costa Rica
- Coordinates: 9.7997365°N 84.162967°W
- Country: Costa Rica
- Province: San José
- Canton: Acosta

Area
  - Total: 22.63 km^{2} (8.74 sq mi)
- Elevation: 1,095 m (3,593 ft)

Population (2011)
  - Total: 9,016
  - Density: 398.4/km^{2} (1,032/sq mi)
- Time zone: UTC−06:00
- Postal code: 11201

San Ignacio is a district of the Acosta canton, in the San José province of Costa Rica.

== Geography ==
San Ignacio has an area of 22.63 km^{2} and an elevation of 1,095 metres.

== Demographics ==
Historical population
Census	Pop.	±% p.a.
1883	697	—
1892	827	+1.92%
1927	2,125	+2.73%
1950	2,184	+0.12%
1963	3,322	+3.28%
1973	4,420	+2.90%
1984	5,036	+1.19%
2000	7,728	+2.71%
2011	9,016	+1.41%
2022	10,318	+1.23%
Source: Instituto Nacional de Estadística y Censos; Centro Centroamericano de Población

For the 2011 census, San Ignacio had a population of 9,016 inhabitants.

== Transportation ==
=== Road transportation ===
The district is covered by the following road routes:

- National Route 209
- National Route 301
