= Rolando Araya Monge =

Costa Rican politician (born 1947)

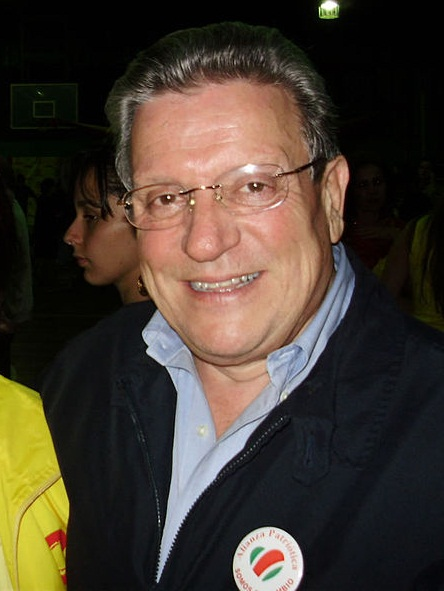
- Araya in 2015

President of the National Liberation Party
- In office 1995–1999
- Preceded by: Manuel Aguilar Bonilla
- Succeeded by: Sonia Picado Sotela
Other positions
Secretary General of the National Liberation Party
In office 1984–1988
Preceded by	Óscar Arias Sánchez
Succeeded by	Jorge Walter Coto Molina
Minister of Public Works and Transport
In office 1982–1984
President	Luis Alberto Monge
Preceded by	Mario Fernández Ortiz
Succeeded by	Hernán Azofeifa Víquez
Municipal President of San José
In office 1978–1980
Preceded by	Johnny Ramírez Azofeifa
Succeeded by	Johnny Ramírez Azofeifa
Deputy of the Legislative Assembly of Costa Rica
In office 1 May 1974 – 30 April 1978
Preceded by	Antonio Jacob Habitt
Succeeded by	Andrés Jenkins Dobles
Constituency	San José (6th Office)

Personal details
- Born: Rolando Araya Monge; 20 August 1947 (age 79) Palmares, Costa Rica
- Party: Independent (since 2022)
- Other political affiliations: A Just Costa Rica (2021-2022); National Liberation Party (1970-2008, 2013-2017, 2019-2021); Patriotic Alliance (2008-2013)
- Relatives: Luis Alberto Monge (uncle); Johnny Araya Monge (brother)
- Education: University of Costa Rica (BS)
- Occupation: Chemical engineer; politician; professor; writer

Rolando Araya Monge (born 20 August 1947) is a Costa Rican chemical engineer and politician who served as Minister of Public Works and Transport from 1982 to 1984. Initially a member of the National Liberation Party, he previously served as Municipal President of San José from 1978 to 1980.

Araya is a nephew of former president Luis Alberto Monge. He was a presidential candidate in the 2002, 2010, and 2022 presidential elections. In addition to his political career, Araya has served as a professor at the University of Costa Rica since 1984 and has worked as a radio host.

== Biography ==
Rolando Araya went to school in Palmares, the place he was born, and at the Lincoln Park High School, Michigan. In 1970 after his university career at the University of Costa Rica, he graduated as an engineer. Just four years later he was elected as congressman in Alajuela. Another year passing by, he became President of the Juventud Liberacionista, the youth organization of the PLN, one of the major parties in Costa Rica. In 1978 he also became Vice-President of the supranational youth organization International Union of Socialist Youth.

Only after another four years, Araya entered the cabinet of his uncle President Luis Alberto Monge as Minister of Public Works and Transport. Two years later he left the government for becoming general secretary of his party National Liberation Party (PLN). In 1993 he decided to run for presidency, but failed in his party primaries. In 1995 he finally was elected as president of the PLN:, a year later Rolando Araya served as Vice-President for the Socialist International. In 2002 Araya run for the presidency again, this time he succeeded in the presidential primary, but he lost the general election. Rolando Araya was one of the founders of the movement Frente Socialdemócrata Costarricense.
