= Social Democratic Progress Party =

Social Democratic Progress Party Partido Progreso Social Democrático
- Abbreviation: PPSD; PSD
- President: Luz Mary Alpízar Loaiza
- General Secretary: Paola Najera Abarca
- Founder: Luz Mary Alpízar Loaiza
- Founded: 20 May 2018
- Registered: January 2020
- Split from: New Generation Party
- Ideology: Social liberalism; Social democracy; Economic liberalism
- Political position: Centre-right
- Colours: Green White Blue
- Legislative Assembly: 0 / 57

Party flag

Website
- progreso.cr

The Social Democratic Progress Party (Spanish: Partido Progreso Social Democrático, PPSD or PSD) is a Costa Rican political party founded in 2018 and led by Luz Mary Alpízar.

== Background ==
The party was created in 2018 by their founder Luz Mary Alpízar Loaiza, formerly part of New Generation Party.

For the 2022 general elections, the party served as the electoral vehicle for the presidential ambitions of Rodrigo Chaves Robles, an economist who worked at the World Bank who was appointed to Minister of Finance in 2019 for a short seven months tenure after resigning over conflicts with then president Carlos Alvarado. Was also supported by journalist and political activist Pilar Cisneros Gallo, who would end up nominated by this party as deputy for San José gaining the seat.

The Chavismo however quickyl broke with the party and 9 out of 10 deputies split from it in the Legislative Assembly, leaving Alpízar as sole PPSD deputy. Most of Chavismo as well as President Chaves himself and Cisneros moved to the Sovereign People's Party endorsing the candidacy of future president Laura Fernández in the 2026 election, of which Fernández was victorious. Alpizar was the party's presidential candidate in that same election gathering around 0.35% at around 8,000 votes and no seats.

== Ideology ==
=== During Chaves' leadership ===
As party's candidate Chaves expresses that they want to lower taxes but maintain sustainable social policies, while helping companies and giving benefits to farmers. It is against monopolies, promotes improvements in the prices of the basic basket products such as rice and is against unnecessary paperwork and bureaucracy in institutions. As such, it advocates reducing public spending by closing unnecessary institutions.

In the social and environmental sphere, Chaves affirms that his government will seek better unemployment plans with more competitive tourism, affirms that he is not against the legalization of marijuana since it brings economic and social benefits, but he affirms that he has an unfavorable perception of the decriminalization of abortion.

Since Chaves' split this might not be the official positions of the party.

== Electoral performance ==
=== Presidential ===
Election	Candidate	First round				Second round			
Election	Candidate	Votes	%	Position	Result	Votes	%	Position	Result
2022	Rodrigo Chaves Robles	351,453	16.78%	2nd	-	1,035,388	52.82	1st	Won
2026	Luz Mary Alpízar Loaiza	6,552	0.26%	10th	Lost				

=== Parliamentary ===
Election	Leader	Votes	%	Seats	+/–	Position	Government
2022	Rodrigo Chaves Robles	312,120	15.04%	10 / 57	New	2nd	Government
2026	Luz Mary Alpízar Loaiza	14,832	0.58%	0 / 57	▼10	11th	Extra-parliamentary
