= National Route 301 (Costa Rica) =

Road in Costa Rica

National Tertiary Route 301
- Ruta nacional terciaria 301

Route information
- Maintained by Ministry of Public Works and Transport
- Length: 52 km (32 mi)

Major junctions
- North end: Route 209
- South end: Route 34

Location
- Country: Costa Rica

Highway system
- National Road Network of Costa Rica

National Tertiary Route 301, is a road between San Ignacio district in San José province and Parrita in the Puntarenas province.

== Description ==
The route starts at the intersection with Route 209 that crosses the San Ignacio district, and goes south and downward to the Pacific Ocean, traversing the communities of Cangrejal, Sabanillas, Bijagual, and Surubres, then finally arrives at its intersection with Route 34. It is currently as of December 2019, a gravel road.

== History ==
=== Future developments ===
In December 2019 there was an announcement by the central government that the road would be paved with asphalt. Designs will be drafter through 2020, with works starting at the end of the same year, with a projected cost of CRC ₡5,100,000,000.
