= Progressive Liberal Party (Costa Rica) =

Political party in Costa Rica

Progressive Liberal Party Partido Liberal Progresista
- President: Eliécer Feinzaig Mintz
- Secretary-General: Marta Eugenia Blanco Cordero
- Founded: 27 February 2016; 10 years ago
- Split from: Libertarian Movement
- Ideology: Liberalism
- Political position: Centre-right
- International affiliation: Liberal International (observer)
- Colours: Orange, and White
- Legislative Assembly: 0 / 57
- Mayors: 3 / 82
- Aldermen: 2 / 508
- Syndics: 1 / 486
- District councillors: 8 / 1,944
- Intendants: 0 / 8

Party flag

Website
- liberal.cr

The Progressive Liberal Party (Spanish: Partido Liberal Progresista) is a classical-liberal political party in Costa Rica.

It was founded on February 27, 2016, and participated in the 2018 parliamentary election for deputies in the provinces of San José, Alajuela, Heredia and Puntarenas, without obtaining seats in the Legislative Assembly. The PLP is chaired by the former Transport Vice-minister during the Rodríguez Echeverría administration, Eliécer Feinzaig. As a liberal party (both economically and culturally), it is in favor of a capitalist and free market economy, legalization of marijuana, in vitro fertilization and same-sex marriage.

The fundamental principles of the party are:

- The dignity and autonomy of the individual.
- The market economy.
- A small and efficient state.
- A tolerant society, free of discrimination and privileges created by law.
- Separation between religion and state.
- Respect for private property and the rule of law.

== Electoral performance ==
=== Presidential ===
Election	Candidate	First round				Second round			
Election	Candidate	Votes	%	Position	Result	Votes	%	Position	Result
2022	Eliécer Feinzaig Mintz	259,788	12.40%	4th	Lost	—N/a			
2026	Eliécer Feinzaig Mintz	8,648	0.34%	9th	Lost	—N/a			

=== Parliamentary ===
Election	Leader	Votes	%	Seats	+/–	Position	Government
2018		12,537	0.59%	0 / 57	New	14th	Extra-parliamentary
2022	Eliécer Feinzaig Mintz	188,074	9.06%	6 / 57	▲6	▲4th	Opposition
2026	Eliécer Feinzaig Mintz	17,526	0.69%	0 / 57	▼6	▼10th	Extra-parliamentary

== See also ==
- Liberalism in Costa Rica
