= New Generation Party (Costa Rica) =

Political party in Costa Rica

New Generation Party Partido Nueva Generación
- President: Sergio Mena
- Founded: July 8, 2012
- Ideology: Conservatism; Economic liberalism
- Political position: Centre-right to right-wing
- Colours: Blue and orange
- Legislative Assembly: 0 / 57
- Mayors: 4 / 82
- Alderpeople: 24 / 508
- Syndics: 14 / 486
- District councillors: 76 / 1,944
- Intendants: 0 / 8

Website
- https://partidonuevageneracion.cr/

The New Generation Party (Spanish: Partido Nueva Generación) is a conservative political party in Costa Rica. The party was founded in 2012 in order to partake in the 2014 general election.

In the 2014 election, its nominee was party's founder Sergio Mena, former councilor of Montes de Oca municipal council and president of this. Mena was also first in parliamentary list, but the party did not earn enough votes to enter Parliament and Mena himself received 1.2% of the presidential ticket.

Yet, in the following 2016 mid-term municipal elections, the party won three cantons therefore electing three mayors and many councilors, and placed in fourth after some of Costa Rica's major parties like PLN, PAC and PUSC. Most of the party's candidates though were already well known political figures rejected by their original parties. As of 2018 it was under talks for a nation-wide multi-party coalition with different conservative parties.

== Ideology ==
Originally having a more liberal approach in favor of such topics like church-state separation and same-sex unions, the party later switched to the more conservative side. In the second round of the 2018 Costa Rican general election Mena endorsed conservative candidate Fabricio Alvarado. Mena also took part in an anti-immigration rally organized in August 2018; later the same year, he expressed in an interview that "Progres [progressives] only know how to insult and offend". He was also in talks with several minor right-wing conservative parties for a coalition in the next election. In April 2019 its National Congress officially proclaimed the party as "center-right" and adhered to conservative positions officially rejecting abortion and same-sex marriage.

In September 2020, it received the adhesion of independent deputy Erick Rodríguez Steller, a controversial figure due to his positions on immigrants and LGBT people. However, per regulations, he continued to serve as an independent legislator and the New Generation Party was not recognized as a fraction of the legislative body.

== Electoral performance ==
=== Presidential ===
Election	Candidate	First round				Second round			
Election	Candidate	Votes	%	Position	Result	Votes	%	Position	Result
2014	Sergio Mena	5,882	0.29%	10th	Lost	—N/a			
2018	Sergio Mena	16,329	0.76%	▲9th	Lost	—N/a			
2022	Sergio Mena	11,643	0.56%	▼13th	Lost	—N/a			
2026	Fernando Zamora	5,516	0.22%	▲11th	Lost	—N/a			

=== Parliamentary ===
Election	Leader	Votes	%	Seats	+/–	Position	Government
2014	Sergio Mena	25,060	1.22%	0 / 57	New	10th	Extra-parliamentary
2018	Sergio Mena	45,896	2.15%	0 / 57	0	▼11th	Extra-parliamentary
2022	Sergio Mena	37,144	1.79%	0 / 57	0	▲9th	Extra-parliamentary
2026	Fernando Zamora	17,758	0.70%	0 / 57	0	▼14th	Extra-parliamentary
