= Social Christian Republican Party =

Social Christian Republican Party Partido Republicano Social Cristiano
- President: Otto Roberto Vargas
- Secretary-General: Rodolfo Sotomayor Aguilar
- Founder: Rodolfo Hernández Gómez; Rafael Ángel Calderón Fournier
- Founded: 28 June 2014; 12 years ago
- Split from: Social Christian Unity Party
- Ideology: Christian democracy Conservatism; Social conservatism Calderonism
- Political position: Centre-right
- International affiliation: Union of Latin American Parties
- Colours: Blue, red, and yellow
- Legislative Assembly: 0 / 57
- Mayors: 2 / 82
- Alderpeople: 23 / 508
- Syndics: 10 / 486
- District councillors: 66 / 1,944
- Intendants: 2 / 8

Party flag

The Social Christian Republican Party (Spanish: Partido Republicano Social Cristiano) is a Costa Rican political party founded in 2014 by former president Rafael Ángel Calderón Fournier and his group of supporters as a splinter from the historical Social Christian Unity Party (PUSC). The party also uses the colors and a similar name of Calderón's father's party, the National Republican Party.

The Party was created soon after the Calderonistas left PUSC due to unusually harsh clashes among the Calderonista and Liberal factions inside the party during the general election of 2014. Both factions have been historically rivals but generally work together after the primaries. However, after the 2013 presidential primary (in which the Calderonista candidate Dr. Rodolfo Hernández won), internal fighting between Hernández and the Liberal-led National Committee caused Hernández's resignation.

Hernández and Calderón founded the PRSC a few months after the election, and its first election was in the 2016 municipal elections, with the party electing one mayor, one intendant and several aldermen and syndics. Its candidate for the 2018 Costa Rican general election, is Hernández.

== Electoral performance ==
=== Presidential ===
Election	Candidate	First round				Second round			
Election	Candidate	Votes	%	Position	Result	Votes	%	Position	Result
2018	Rodolfo Hernández	106,444	4.94%	6th	Lost	—N/a			
2022	Rodolfo Hernández	12,224	0.58%	▼12th	Lost	—N/a			

=== Parliamentary ===
Election	Leader	Votes	%	Seats	+/–	Position	Government
2018	Rodolfo Hernández	89,969	4.21%	2 / 57	New	6th	Opposition
2022	Rodolfo Hernández	31,227	1.50%	0 / 57	▼2	▼11th	Extra-parliamentary
