= Guanacaste (Legislative Assembly constituency) =

Constituency in Costa Rica

- Constituency for the Legislative Assembly of Costa Rica
- Location of Guanacaste within Costa Rica
- Province: Guanacaste
- Population: 412,808 (2022)
- Electorate: 259,994 (2022)
- Area: 10,196 km^{2} (2024)

Current Constituency
- Created: 1949
- Seats: List: 4 (2002–present); 5 (1978–2002); 6 (1962–1978); 5 (1949–1962)
- Deputies: List: Melina Ajoy Palma (PUSC); Alejandra Larios Trejos (PLN); Luis Fernando Mendoza Jiménez (PLN); Daniel Gerardo Vargas Quirós (PPSD)

Guanacaste is one of the seven multi-member constituencies of the Legislative Assembly, the national legislature of Costa Rica. The constituency was established in 1949 when the Legislative Assembly was established by the modified constitution imposed by the Figueres dictatorship. It is conterminous with the province of Guanacaste. The constituency currently elects four of the 57 members of the Legislative Assembly using the closed party-list proportional representation electoral system. At the 2022 general election it had 259,994 registered electors.

== Electoral system ==
Guanacaste currently elects four of the 57 members of the Legislative Assembly using the closed party-list proportional representation electoral system. Seats are allocated using the largest remainder method using the Hare quota (cociente). Only parties that receive at least 50% of the Hare quota (subcociente) compete for remainder seats. Any seats remaining unfilled after allocation using the quotient system are distributed amongst parties that surpassed the subcociente, is descending order of their total votes in the constituency. The latter process is repeated until all the seats in the constituency are filled.

== Election results ==
=== Summary ===
Election	United People PU / IU / CC2000 / PASO			Broad Front FA			Citizens' Action PAC			National Republican PRN / PR / PRI / PC			National Liberation PLN / PSD			Social Christian Unity PUSC / CU / PDC			National Unification PUN / PUN			National Integration PIN			Libertarian Movement PML			Social Democratic Progress PPSD			National Restoration PRN		
Election	Votes	%	Seats	Votes	%	Seats	Votes	%	Seats	Votes	%	Seats	Votes	%	Seats	Votes	%	Seats	Votes	%	Seats	Votes	%	Seats	Votes	%	Seats	Votes	%	Seats	Votes	%	Seats
2022	246	0.19%	0	5,562	4.20%	0	2,646	2.00%	0				34,697	26.21%	2	22,937	17.32%	1				1,665	1.26%	0	922	0.70%	0	16,551	12.50%	1	2,579	1.95%	0
2018				3,163	2.27%	0	13,822	9.94%	0				32,486	23.36%	2	20,654	14.85%	1				17,095	12.29%	0	4,467	3.21%	0				21,864	15.72%	1
2014				21,769	16.01%	1	15,660	11.52%	0				47,024	34.58%	2	19,085	14.03%	1				330	0.24%	0	12,278	9.03%	0				4,696	3.45%	0
2010				2,778	2.19%	0	14,729	11.61%	0				54,676	43.11%	3	13,951	11.00%	0				418	0.33%	0	17,162	13.53%	1						
2006	199	0.19%	0				17,194	16.58%	1				46,353	44.70%	3	11,282	10.88%	0				412	0.40%	0	7,511	7.24%	0						
2002	822	0.79%	0				10,688	10.29%	0				40,575	39.07%	2	39,378	37.91%	2				388	0.37%	0	2,865	2.76%	0						
1998	616	0.62%	0										33,670	33.66%	2	50,067	50.05%	3				547	0.55%	0	1,079	1.08%	0						
1994													50,115	47.23%	3	46,717	44.02%	2															
1990	998	1.00%	0										46,016	46.12%	2	50,408	50.52%	3															
1986	1,325	1.45%	0										43,575	47.63%	3	41,726	45.60%	2															
1982	3,051	3.91%	0										46,320	59.38%	3	25,590	32.81%	2															
1978	2,933	4.20%	0										30,078	43.04%	2	31,801	45.50%	3	2,897	4.15%	0												
1974	1,877	3.23%	0							3,396	5.85%	0	26,745	46.04%	3	2,543	4.38%	0	13,892	23.92%	2												
1970	717	1.46%	0										26,422	53.96%	3	404	0.83%	0	18,353	37.48%	3												
1966													20,228	51.51%	3				15,233	38.79%	3												
1962										10,377	32.21%	2	16,839	52.27%	3				3,844	11.93%	1												
1958										3,340	17.77%	1	8,722	46.41%	3				4,703	25.02%	1												
1953													7,937	53.25%	3				1,608	10.79%	0												
1949												1			0						4												

=== Detailed ===
==== 2020s ====
===== 2022 =====
Results of the 2022 general election held on 6 February 2022:

Party		Votes per canton											Total votes	%	Seats
Party		Aban- gares	Bagaces	Cañas	Carrillo	Hojan- cha	La Cruz	Liberia	Nanda- yure	Nicoya	Santa Cruz	Tilarán	Total votes	%	Seats
National Liberation Party	PLN	2,049	1,765	4,335	4,508	958	1,456	5,260	1,598	4,792	4,555	3,421	34,697	26.21%	2
Social Christian Unity Party	PUSC	865	620	811	1,484	776	746	6,597	1,220	5,626	3,028	1,164	22,937	17.32%	1
Social Democratic Progress Party	PPSD	1,012	1,186	1,157	1,173	438	494	2,316	373	3,153	3,243	2,006	16,551	12.50%	1
New Republic Party	PNR	1,329	733	954	1,276	223	945	2,426	301	1,605	1,667	763	12,222	9.23%	0
Guanacastecan Union Party	PUG	297	813	652	1,144	260	1,027	2,379	346	1,214	1,687	267	10,086	7.62%	0
Broad Front	FA	220	395	302	327	129	155	1,005	199	1,429	949	452	5,562	4.20%	0
Progressive Liberal Party	PLP	243	227	269	397	113	157	1,037	80	585	1,348	287	4,743	3.58%	0
Accessibility without Exclusion	PASE	114	86	83	279	19	260	907	57	316	996	52	3,169	2.39%	0
Citizens' Action Party	PAC	89	179	164	192	59	97	418	43	231	910	264	2,646	2.00%	0
National Restoration Party	PRN	123	393	218	200	33	153	299	350	383	320	107	2,579	1.95%	0
Social Christian Republican Party	PRSC	101	131	315	168	83	159	304	85	321	384	395	2,446	1.85%	0
A Just Costa Rica	CRJ	58	49	82	511	21	45	300	32	678	247	50	2,073	1.57%	0
National Force Party	PFN	27	39	48	98	73	33	175	127	910	352	43	1,925	1.45%	0
National Integration Party	PIN	194	22	23	71	36	39	214	74	554	417	21	1,665	1.26%	0
New Generation Party	PNG	347	58	48	94	34	61	112	56	399	180	65	1,454	1.10%	0
Costa Rican Social Justice Party	JSC	65	75	146	97	50	87	205	49	260	213	59	1,306	0.99%	0
United We Can	UP	51	398	247	23	15	21	106	44	77	97	23	1,102	0.83%	0
Libertarian Movement	PML	475	31	59	31	13	16	78	15	98	74	32	922	0.70%	0
Costa Rican Democratic Union	PUCD	13	71	18	59	60	22	92	162	324	85	12	918	0.69%	0
Costa Rican Social; Democratic Movement	PMSDC	26	19	31	80	16	15	104	10	97	309	38	745	0.56%	0
Liberal Union Party	UL	82	48	45	62	14	20	139	33	79	130	62	714	0.54%	0
National Encounter Party	PEN	23	17	23	17	64	5	65	18	224	28	65	549	0.41%	0
Christian Democratic Alliance	ADC	34	30	32	73	21	29	74	28	107	88	32	548	0.41%	0
Our People Party	PNP	14	14	20	29	6	5	128	10	47	37	6	316	0.24%	0
Workers' Party	PT	11	20	29	26	5	11	40	6	44	62	19	273	0.21%	0
United People	PU	7	7	14	29	12	9	26	18	49	60	15	246	0.19%	0
Valid votes		7,869	7,426	10,125	12,448	3,531	6,067	24,806	5,334	23,602	21,466	9,720	132,394	100.00%	4
Blank votes		86	92	126	172	80	87	210	84	338	359	95	1,729	1.27%	
Rejected votes – other		104	118	169	201	53	113	383	103	439	526	103	2,312	1.69%	
Total polled		8,059	7,636	10,420	12,821	3,664	6,267	25,399	5,521	24,379	22,351	9,918	136,435	52.48%	
Registered electors		14,376	14,900	20,485	26,622	6,336	14,838	49,183	8,887	43,811	44,639	15,917	259,994		
Turnout		56.06%	51.25%	50.87%	48.16%	57.83%	42.24%	51.64%	62.12%	55.65%	50.07%	62.31%	52.48%		

The following candidates were elected: Melina Ajoy Palma (PUSC); Alejandra Larios Trejos (PLN); Luis Fernando Mendoza Jiménez (PLN); and Daniel Gerardo Vargas Quirós (PPSD).

==== 2010s ====
===== 2018 =====
Results of the 2018 general election held on 4 February 2018:

Party		Votes per canton											Total votes	%	Seats
Party		Aban- gares	Bagaces	Cañas	Carrillo	Hojan- cha	La Cruz	Liberia	Nanda- yure	Nicoya	Santa Cruz	Tilarán	Total votes	%	Seats
National Liberation Party	PLN	1,653	1,434	2,316	2,818	1,208	1,407	4,842	1,463	7,628	5,360	2,357	32,486	23.36%	2
National Restoration Party	PRN	902	1,873	3,060	2,089	442	1,456	3,807	880	3,254	2,093	2,008	21,864	15.72%	1
Social Christian Unity Party	PUSC	1,471	844	1,231	1,769	744	948	2,594	876	6,199	2,229	1,749	20,654	14.85%	1
National Integration Party	PIN	532	581	1,578	1,041	369	462	1,446	364	1,686	8,509	527	17,095	12.29%	0
Citizens' Action Party	PAC	635	1,066	1,035	1,117	571	859	2,949	623	2,003	1,418	1,546	13,822	9.94%	0
Guanacastecan Union Party	PUG	353	494	270	1,126	175	773	2,342	345	776	1,112	228	7,994	5.75%	0
Social Christian Republican Party	PRSC	223	186	260	638	81	119	884	194	833	862	599	4,879	3.51%	0
Libertarian Movement	PML	161	251	155	1,099	154	110	1,063	146	587	470	271	4,467	3.21%	0
Accessibility without Exclusion	PASE	133	123	81	270	22	94	2,982	66	154	191	102	4,218	3.03%	0
Costa Rican Renewal Party	PRC	226	150	277	584	44	121	1,037	102	380	263	166	3,350	2.41%	0
Broad Front	FA	115	326	204	151	49	79	456	217	1,118	271	177	3,163	2.27%	0
Christian Democratic Alliance	ADC	1,534	86	144	104	21	62	210	37	160	112	81	2,551	1.83%	0
New Generation Party	PNG	47	288	90	257	34	51	507	84	338	171	93	1,960	1.41%	0
Workers' Party	PT	19	42	28	50	20	23	137	22	75	106	38	560	0.40%	0
Valid votes		8,004	7,744	10,729	13,113	3,934	6,564	25,256	5,419	25,191	23,167	9,942	139,063	100.00%	4
Blank votes		63	44	93	95	53	57	160	56	247	191	80	1,139	0.80%	
Rejected votes – other		175	133	187	302	60	123	392	100	493	520	114	2,599	1.82%	
Total polled		8,242	7,921	11,009	13,510	4,047	6,744	25,808	5,575	25,931	23,878	10,136	142,801	59.34%	
Registered electors		13,610	13,686	19,476	24,283	6,014	13,023	44,938	8,464	40,987	41,107	15,049	240,637		
Turnout		60.56%	57.88%	56.53%	55.64%	67.29%	51.79%	57.43%	65.87%	63.27%	58.09%	67.35%	59.34%		

The following candidates were elected: Luis Antonio Aiza Campos (PLN); Mileyde Alvarado Arias (PRN); Aida María Montiel Héctor (PLN); and Rodolfo Peña Flores (PUSC).

===== 2014 =====
Results of the 2014 general election held on 2 February 2014:

Party		Votes per canton											Total votes	%	Seats
Party		Aban- gares	Bagaces	Cañas	Carrillo	Hojan- cha	La Cruz	Liberia	Nanda- yure	Nicoya	Santa Cruz	Tilarán	Total votes	%	Seats
National Liberation Party	PLN	3,039	1,967	3,144	4,189	1,911	2,024	7,138	2,537	10,826	7,123	3,126	47,024	34.58%	2
Broad Front	FA	1,853	1,139	2,028	859	410	1,124	3,931	1,103	4,081	3,790	1,451	21,769	16.01%	1
Social Christian Unity Party	PUSC	667	772	667	3,495	267	735	4,999	322	2,505	3,346	1,310	19,085	14.03%	1
Citizens' Action Party	PAC	1,044	1,792	2,293	826	394	351	2,966	330	2,020	2,056	1,588	15,660	11.52%	0
Libertarian Movement	PML	721	879	529	1,402	322	813	1,966	338	2,903	1,643	762	12,278	9.03%	0
Costa Rican Renewal Party	PRC	206	354	231	1,105	202	496	1,369	240	617	1,020	425	6,265	4.61%	0
National Restoration Party	PRN	288	182	1,822	190	62	111	646	225	529	424	217	4,696	3.45%	0
New Homeland Party	PPN	82	54	102	156	39	30	253	197	533	1,364	515	3,325	2.45%	0
Accessibility without Exclusion	PASE	175	102	103	160	144	66	479	83	377	351	159	2,199	1.62%	0
National Advance	PAN	9	16	53	272	3	157	57	5	250	1,044	115	1,981	1.46%	0
Workers' Party	PT	36	40	42	63	22	30	108	27	140	149	33	690	0.51%	0
New Generation Party	PNG	16	24	25	24	96	9	70	40	201	153	30	688	0.51%	0
National Integration Party	PIN	25	12	9	23	7	10	40	12	117	52	23	330	0.24%	0
Valid votes		8,161	7,333	11,048	12,764	3,879	5,956	24,022	5,459	25,099	22,515	9,754	135,990	100.00%	4
Blank votes		95	63	97	96	48	59	134	61	324	214	59	1,250	0.89%	
Rejected votes – other		185	185	261	234	59	149	363	125	578	608	130	2,877	2.05%	
Total polled		8,441	7,581	11,406	13,094	3,986	6,164	24,519	5,645	26,001	23,337	9,943	140,117	63.20%	
Registered electors		12,801	12,446	18,440	22,180	5,487	10,846	41,245	7,979	38,300	37,832	14,132	221,688		
Turnout		65.94%	60.91%	61.85%	59.04%	72.64%	56.83%	59.45%	70.75%	67.89%	61.69%	70.36%	63.20%		

The following candidates were elected: Marta Arabela Arauz Mora (PLN); Johny Leiva Badilla (PUSC); Juan Rafael Marín Quirós (PLN); and Ronal Vargas Araya (FA).

===== 2010 =====
Results of the 2010 general election held on 7 February 2010:

Party		Votes per canton											Total votes	%	Seats
Party		Aban- gares	Bagaces	Cañas	Carrillo	Hojan- cha	La Cruz	Liberia	Nanda- yure	Nicoya	Santa Cruz	Tilarán	Total votes	%	Seats
National Liberation Party	PLN	2,691	2,737	5,597	5,469	1,807	2,447	5,631	2,971	11,601	10,001	3,724	54,676	43.11%	3
Libertarian Movement	PML	1,077	831	1,183	1,646	378	1,275	1,978	572	2,931	3,537	1,754	17,162	13.53%	1
Citizens' Action Party	PAC	686	1,384	1,284	1,018	302	570	1,943	576	1,969	3,518	1,479	14,729	11.61%	0
Social Christian Unity Party	PUSC	686	497	987	1,395	301	554	1,976	391	4,226	2,032	906	13,951	11.00%	0
Accessibility without Exclusion	PASE	330	336	348	1,003	55	126	8,801	74	557	734	346	12,710	10.02%	0
Costa Rican Renewal Party	PRC	399	625	622	894	92	479	1,010	126	709	866	611	6,433	5.07%	0
Patriotic Alliance	AP	1,146	317	205	85	579	31	230	326	649	250	153	3,971	3.13%	0
Broad Front	FA	376	55	133	315	31	40	193	39	810	613	173	2,778	2.19%	0
National Integration Party	PIN	35	18	18	33	6	13	155	21	50	52	17	418	0.33%	0
Valid votes		7,426	6,800	10,377	11,858	3,551	5,535	21,917	5,096	23,502	21,603	9,163	126,828	100.00%	4
Blank votes		134	118	109	138	93	71	259	99	385	404	131	1,941	1.47%	
Rejected votes – other		247	132	203	279	59	139	503	148	601	643	208	3,162	2.40%	
Total polled		7,807	7,050	10,689	12,275	3,703	5,745	22,679	5,343	24,488	22,650	9,502	131,931	66.22%	
Registered electors		11,481	10,928	17,069	19,540	4,935	9,025	36,952	7,390	34,993	33,780	13,144	199,237		
Turnout		68.00%	64.51%	62.62%	62.82%	75.04%	63.66%	61.37%	72.30%	69.98%	67.05%	72.29%	66.22%		

The following candidates were elected: Luis Antonio Aiza Campos (PLN); Ernesto Enrique Chavarría Ruiz (PML); Luis Fernando Mendoza Jiménez (PLN); and Christia María Ocampo Baltodano (PLN).

==== 2000s ====
===== 2006 =====
Results of the 2006 general election held on 5 February 2006:

Party		Votes per canton											Total votes	%	Seats
Party		Aban- gares	Bagaces	Cañas	Carrillo	Hojan- cha	La Cruz	Liberia	Nanda- yure	Nicoya	Santa Cruz	Tilarán	Total votes	%	Seats
National Liberation Party	PLN	2,146	2,153	4,320	5,051	1,693	2,125	7,158	1,888	9,556	7,759	2,504	46,353	44.70%	3
Citizens' Action Party	PAC	864	1,472	1,847	1,424	489	449	3,271	541	2,569	3,131	1,137	17,194	16.58%	1
Social Christian Unity Party	PUSC	681	920	1,017	1,124	202	630	1,732	214	1,270	1,525	1,967	11,282	10.88%	0
Libertarian Movement	PML	185	171	334	398	216	85	832	325	3,642	767	556	7,511	7.24%	0
Costa Rican Renewal Party	PRC	319	531	544	389	100	430	801	132	633	450	744	5,073	4.89%	0
Independent Guanacaste Party	PGI	870	233	380	390	72	283	1,311	87	373	139	872	5,010	4.83%	0
National Union Party	PUN	29	51	103	318	83	21	174	161	175	2,022	41	3,178	3.06%	0
Democratic Nationalist Alliance	ADN	1,213	19	366	18	39	30	64	352	585	142	21	2,849	2.75%	0
Union for Change Party	PUPC	79	39	82	161	22	62	1,025	82	131	187	30	1,900	1.83%	0
Patriotic Union	UP	10	27	14	19	36	43	115	260	404	261	12	1,201	1.16%	0
Homeland First Party	PPP	49	54	71	63	22	53	228	44	82	135	51	852	0.82%	0
Democratic Force	FD	56	33	194	24	15	5	54	38	125	74	63	681	0.66%	0
National Integration Party	PIN	17	16	24	26	2	6	65	14	104	121	17	412	0.40%	0
United Left	IU	18	5	28	13	7	5	27	9	49	23	15	199	0.19%	0
Valid votes		6,536	5,724	9,324	9,418	2,998	4,227	16,857	4,147	19,698	16,736	8,030	103,695	100.00%	4
Blank votes		61	93	127	131	59	59	180	75	268	261	101	1,415	1.30%	
Rejected votes – other		339	156	238	273	61	212	489	131	625	611	208	3,343	3.08%	
Total polled		6,936	5,973	9,689	9,822	3,118	4,498	17,526	4,353	20,591	17,608	8,339	108,453	62.10%	
Registered electors		10,367	9,654	15,609	16,965	4,460	7,606	31,339	6,541	31,079	29,049	11,961	174,630		
Turnout		66.90%	61.87%	62.07%	57.90%	69.91%	59.14%	55.92%	66.55%	66.25%	60.61%	69.72%	62.10%		

The following candidates were elected: Maureen Ballestero Vargas (PLN); Saturnino Fonseca Chavarría (PLN); Gilberto Jerez Rojas (PLN); and José Quirino Rosales Obando (PAC).

===== 2002 =====
Results of the 2002 general election held on 3 February 2002:

Party		Votes per canton											Total votes	%	Seats
Party		Aban- gares	Bagaces	Cañas	Carrillo	Hojan- cha	La Cruz	Liberia	Nanda- yure	Nicoya	Santa Cruz	Tilarán	Total votes	%	Seats
National Liberation Party	PLN	2,368	2,067	3,108	3,667	1,641	1,968	6,170	2,041	9,864	5,034	2,647	40,575	39.07%	2
Social Christian Unity Party	PUSC	2,683	1,970	3,310	3,640	904	1,865	7,099	1,442	7,792	5,859	2,814	39,378	37.91%	2
Citizens' Action Party	PAC	911	969	1,583	674	207	271	1,805	242	1,125	1,322	1,579	10,688	10.29%	0
Costa Rican Renewal Party	PRC	117	133	215	903	228	201	445	123	428	3,397	284	6,474	6.23%	0
Libertarian Movement	PML	204	159	355	225	27	55	606	66	485	294	389	2,865	2.76%	0
Democratic Force	FD	62	38	106	74	17	23	566	16	80	115	111	1,208	1.16%	0
Coalition Change 2000	CC2000	24	11	53	46	5	5	137	16	89	418	18	822	0.79%	0
National Patriotic Party	PPN	18	3	14	49	12	16	28	15	45	189	16	405	0.39%	0
National Christian Alliance	ANC	37	20	33	46	13	23	48	19	65	52	45	401	0.39%	0
National Integration Party	PIN	20	26	29	27	2	9	49	16	47	136	27	388	0.37%	0
National Rescue Party	PRN	17	8	24	39	6	7	16	14	50	109	10	300	0.29%	0
Independent Workers' Party	PIO	16	3	37	17	4	11	18	11	34	50	14	215	0.21%	0
General Union Party	PUGEN	6	6	7	9	2	8	46	6	17	28	6	141	0.14%	0
Valid votes		6,483	5,413	8,874	9,416	3,068	4,462	17,033	4,027	20,121	17,003	7,960	103,860	100.00%	4
Blank votes		145	92	133	142	71	79	215	98	344	334	115	1,768	1.63%	
Rejected votes – other		148	95	195	287	55	117	310	97	525	639	141	2,609	2.41%	
Total polled		6,776	5,600	9,202	9,845	3,194	4,658	17,558	4,222	20,990	17,976	8,216	108,237	69.80%	
Registered electors		9,439	8,649	14,077	14,648	4,206	6,595	26,817	5,918	28,058	25,589	11,068	155,064		
Turnout		71.79%	64.75%	65.37%	67.21%	75.94%	70.63%	65.47%	71.34%	74.81%	70.25%	74.23%	69.80%		

The following candidates were elected: Sigifredo Aiza Campos (PLN); Francisco Sanchún Morán (PUSC); María Lourdes Ocampo Fernández (PLN); and Ligia María Zúñiga Clachar (PUSC).

==== 1990s ====
===== 1998 =====
Results of the 1998 general election held on 1 February 1998:

Party		Votes per canton											Total votes	%	Seats
Party		Aban- gares	Bagaces	Cañas	Carrillo	Hojan- cha	La Cruz	Liberia	Nanda- yure	Nicoya	Santa Cruz	Tilarán	Total votes	%	Seats
Social Christian Unity Party	PUSC	4,135	2,923	4,095	5,041	1,330	2,522	8,046	1,643	9,481	7,375	3,476	50,067	50.05%	3
National Liberation Party	PLN	1,250	2,174	2,687	3,148	1,271	1,473	5,907	1,539	6,454	4,113	3,654	33,670	33.66%	2
Democratic Force	FD	1,039	115	291	145	30	44	498	434	1,212	276	103	4,187	4.19%	0
Costa Rican Renewal Party	PRC	18	32	23	549	13	42	121	95	186	1,972	53	3,104	3.10%	0
Independent Party	PI	7	38	938	228	6	9	140	3	205	656	12	2,242	2.24%	0
Independent Guanacaste Party	PGI	310	139	187	46	199	74	45	18	483	91	31	1,623	1.62%	0
National Independent Party	PNI	7	17	83	76	4	8	38	35	92	746	10	1,116	1.12%	0
Libertarian Movement	PML	24	57	70	44	1	8	89	9	205	36	536	1,079	1.08%	0
General Union Party	PUGEN	11	27	10	8	1	5	761	3	19	46	9	900	0.90%	0
United People	PU	12	8	14	18	14	13	77	11	46	390	13	616	0.62%	0
National Integration Party	PIN	20	26	41	46	14	12	99	25	111	134	19	547	0.55%	0
National Rescue Party	PRN	7	9	8	6	2	0	8	159	54	21	3	277	0.28%	0
New Democratic Party	NPD	5	11	11	33	3	6	21	3	94	38	7	232	0.23%	0
Democratic Party	PD	5	14	11	33	11	4	34	5	40	36	13	206	0.21%	0
National Christian Alliance	ANC	15	12	29	16	1	2	36	6	22	9	19	167	0.17%	0
Valid votes		6,865	5,602	8,498	9,437	2,900	4,222	15,920	3,988	18,704	15,939	7,958	100,033	100.00%	5
Blank votes		69	72	95	91	83	66	135	98	300	233	79	1,321	1.26%	
Rejected votes – other		281	119	261	216	110	94	331	215	688	777	259	3,351	3.20%	
Total polled		7,215	5,793	8,854	9,744	3,093	4,382	16,386	4,301	19,692	16,949	8,296	104,705	73.90%	
Registered electors		9,065	8,027	12,557	13,292	3,917	5,964	23,169	5,883	26,251	23,069	10,496	141,690		
Turnout		79.59%	72.17%	70.51%	73.31%	78.96%	73.47%	70.72%	73.11%	75.01%	73.47%	79.04%	73.90%		

The following candidates were elected: Emanuel Ajoy Chan (PUSC); Óscar Campos Chavarría (PLN); Marisol Clachar Rivas (PUSC); Manuel Alfonso Larios Ugalde (PLN); and Irene Urpí Pacheco (PUSC).

===== 1994 =====
Results of the 1994 general election held on 6 February 1994:

Party		Votes per canton											Total votes	%	Seats
Party		Aban- gares	Bagaces	Cañas	Carrillo	Hojan- cha	La Cruz	Liberia	Nanda- yure	Nicoya	Santa Cruz	Tilarán	Total votes	%	Seats
National Liberation Party	PLN	2,766	3,127	4,244	4,887	1,845	2,145	8,068	2,462	9,810	6,958	3,803	50,115	47.23%	3
Social Christian Unity Party	PUSC	2,943	2,353	4,353	4,776	1,006	1,881	7,331	1,890	8,670	7,500	4,014	46,717	44.02%	2
Independent Guanacaste Party	PGI	900	63	216	166	80	119	330	120	357	377	115	2,843	2.68%	0
Independent Party	PI	15	7	35	40	17	13	51	15	92	2,250	20	2,555	2.41%	0
Democratic Force	FD	50	29	178	64	91	14	229	129	915	152	144	1,995	1.88%	0
General Union Party	PUGEN	10	5	40	32	3	6	361	8	30	22	262	779	0.73%	0
National Christian Alliance	ANC	38	24	86	49	10	12	99	31	105	147	51	652	0.61%	0
National Independent Party	PNI	24	53	150	20	3	20	39	6	52	78	15	460	0.43%	0
Valid votes		6,746	5,661	9,302	10,034	3,055	4,210	16,508	4,661	20,031	17,484	8,424	106,116	100.00%	5
Blank votes		64	70	89	105	48	55	144	51	279	201	79	1,185	1.07%	
Rejected votes – other		262	183	328	185	107	135	436	206	714	715	218	3,489	3.15%	
Total polled		7,072	5,914	9,719	10,324	3,210	4,400	17,088	4,918	21,024	18,400	8,721	110,790	84.14%	
Registered electors		8,187	7,130	11,926	12,139	3,800	5,372	20,445	5,947	25,157	21,569	10,005	131,677		
Turnout		86.38%	82.95%	81.49%	85.05%	84.47%	81.91%	83.58%	82.70%	83.57%	85.31%	87.17%	84.14%		

The following candidates were elected: Víctor Eduardo Álvarez Murillo (PUSC); Bernardo Benavides Benavides (PUSC); Gerardo Humberto Fuentes González (PLN); Luis Alejandro Román Trigo (PLN); and José Roberto Zumbado Arias (PLN).

===== 1990 =====
Results of the 1990 general election held on 4 February 1990:

Party		Votes per canton											Total votes	%	Seats
Party		Aban- gares	Bagaces	Cañas	Carrillo	Hojan- cha	La Cruz	Liberia	Nanda- yure	Nicoya	Santa Cruz	Tilarán	Total votes	%	Seats
Social Christian Unity Party	PUSC	4,045	2,551	4,743	4,877	1,022	2,047	7,366	1,939	9,366	8,479	3,973	50,408	50.52%	3
National Liberation Party	PLN	2,276	2,396	3,514	4,159	1,911	1,650	6,780	2,540	9,804	7,308	3,678	46,016	46.12%	2
United People	PU	23	20	80	57	17	27	353	31	171	177	42	998	1.00%	0
National Christian Alliance	ANC	51	136	159	68	20	44	140	21	84	131	114	968	0.97%	0
National Independent Party	PNI	25	21	47	101	8	17	53	21	105	190	24	612	0.61%	0
General Union Party	PUGEN	15	29	54	47	8	22	178	32	46	65	76	572	0.57%	0
Independent Party	PI	7	8	14	4	3	4	8	3	17	33	4	105	0.11%	0
Party of Progress	PdP	12	6	11	7	6	1	10	4	27	14	6	104	0.10%	0
Valid votes		6,454	5,167	8,622	9,320	2,995	3,812	14,888	4,591	19,620	16,397	7,917	99,783	100.00%	5
Blank votes		44	84	79	79	38	47	127	74	248	205	95	1,120	1.08%	
Rejected votes – other		151	160	216	237	65	77	321	126	535	564	162	2,614	2.53%	
Total polled		6,649	5,411	8,917	9,636	3,098	3,936	15,336	4,791	20,403	17,166	8,174	103,517	83.49%	
Registered electors		7,877	6,507	11,075	11,351	3,635	4,944	18,354	5,897	24,361	20,454	9,526	123,981		
Turnout		84.41%	83.16%	80.51%	84.89%	85.23%	79.61%	83.56%	81.24%	83.75%	83.92%	85.81%	83.49%		

The following candidates were elected: Sigifredo Aiza Campos (PLN); Emanuel Ajoy Chan (PUSC); Solón Chavarría Aguilar (PUSC); Alfredo Cruz Álvarez (PUSC)l and Gladys Rojas Prado (PLN).

==== 1980s ====
===== 1986 =====
Results of the 1986 general election held on 2 February 1986:

Party		Votes per canton											Total votes	%	Seats
Party		Aban- gares	Bagaces	Cañas	Carrillo	Hojan- cha	La Cruz	Liberia	Nanda- yure	Nicoya	Santa Cruz	Tilarán	Total votes	%	Seats
National Liberation Party	PLN	2,589	2,139	3,615	4,007	1,960	1,491	6,377	2,593	8,565	6,369	3,870	43,575	47.63%	3
Social Christian Unity Party	PUSC	2,848	2,301	3,990	4,200	886	1,577	6,213	1,520	7,771	7,058	3,362	41,726	45.60%	2
National Christian Alliance	ANC	73	77	125	253	5	18	130	8	299	1,104	181	2,273	2.48%	0
National Republican Party	PNR	49	68	76	101	39	37	86	127	678	291	47	1,599	1.75%	0
United People	PU	54	35	68	77	12	48	700	25	133	155	18	1,325	1.45%	0
People's Alliance Coalition	CAP	37	18	37	53	4	22	123	17	281	122	32	746	0.82%	0
General Union Party	PUGEN	10	6	12	27	0	1	29	3	17	16	131	252	0.28%	0
Valid votes		5,660	4,644	7,923	8,718	2,906	3,194	13,658	4,293	17,744	15,115	7,641	91,496	100.00%	5
Blank votes		48	62	80	90	33	57	161	74	315	236	70	1,226	1.28%	
Rejected votes – other		162	172	242	245	65	113	305	151	656	682	199	2,992	3.13%	
Total polled		5,870	4,878	8,245	9,053	3,004	3,364	14,124	4,518	18,715	16,033	7,910	95,714	83.62%	
Registered electors		6,964	5,907	10,004	10,471	3,523	4,354	16,810	5,684	22,726	18,916	9,098	114,457		
Turnout		84.29%	82.58%	82.42%	86.46%	85.27%	77.26%	84.02%	79.49%	82.35%	84.76%	86.94%	83.62%		

The following candidates were elected: Óscar Julio Ávila Solé (PUSC); Ángel Marín Madrigal (PLN); José Joaquín Muñoz Bustos (PUSC); Víctor Julio Román Méndez (PLN); and Antonio Tacsan Lam (PLN).

===== 1982 =====
Results of the 1982 general election held on 7 February 1982:

Party		Votes per canton											Total votes	%	Seats
Party		Aban- gares	Bagaces	Cañas	Carrillo	Hojan- cha	La Cruz	Liberia	Nanda- yure	Nicoya	Santa Cruz	Tilarán	Total votes	%	Seats
National Liberation Party	PLN	2,972	1,924	3,234	4,168	1,779	1,682	6,588	2,765	9,742	8,019	3,447	46,320	59.38%	3
Unity Coalition	CU	1,640	1,537	2,328	2,569	467	671	3,522	928	4,930	4,707	2,291	25,590	32.81%	2
United People	PU	145	83	197	364	22	220	689	76	545	625	85	3,051	3.91%	0
National Movement	MN	222	142	595	102	26	53	446	35	253	190	354	2,418	3.10%	0
National Democratic Party	PND	56	35	103	24	6	11	48	7	64	57	35	446	0.57%	0
Democratic Party	PD	23	13	16	13	9	4	24	11	29	27	8	177	0.23%	0
Valid votes		5,058	3,734	6,473	7,240	2,309	2,641	11,317	3,822	15,563	13,625	6,220	78,002	100.00%	5
Blank votes		67	85	87	90	21	56	87	71	203	209	94	1,070	1.32%	
Rejected votes – other		170	128	226	186	58	66	270	128	443	479	103	2,257	2.78%	
Total polled		5,295	3,947	6,786	7,516	2,388	2,763	11,674	4,021	16,209	14,313	6,417	81,329	80.65%	
Registered electors		6,318	5,151	8,567	9,079	3,069	3,822	14,396	5,341	20,097	17,063	7,937	100,840		
Turnout		83.81%	76.63%	79.21%	82.78%	77.81%	72.29%	81.09%	75.29%	80.65%	83.88%	80.85%	80.65%		

The following candidates were elected: Rodolfo Brenes Gómez (CU); Odette Héctor Marín (PLN); Manuel Francisco Rojas Chaves (PLN); Hamilton Ruiz Cascante (CU); and Guillermo Vargas Sanabria (PLN).

==== 1970s ====
===== 1978 =====
Results of the 1978 general election held on 5 February 1978:

Party		Votes per canton											Total votes	%	Seats
Party		Aban- gares	Bagaces	Cañas	Carrillo	Hojan- cha	La Cruz	Liberia	Nanda- yure	Nicoya	Santa Cruz	Tilarán	Total votes	%	Seats
Unity Coalition	CU	1,927	1,901	2,782	3,295	717	1,016	4,704	1,316	5,576	5,365	3,202	31,801	45.50%	3
National Liberation Party	PLN	1,420	1,153	2,090	2,501	1,570	1,275	3,984	2,060	6,765	4,855	2,405	30,078	43.04%	2
United People	PU	35	92	173	239	17	92	713	53	419	1,052	48	2,933	4.20%	0
National Unification Party	PUN	709	124	217	121	49	54	141	128	1,008	293	53	2,897	4.15%	0
Republican Union Party	PUR	62	42	73	57	24	24	70	49	380	133	24	938	1.34%	0
National Independent Party	PNI	21	13	44	22	19	10	30	26	215	52	20	472	0.68%	0
Independent Party	PI	9	14	139	43	6	14	25	19	59	59	12	399	0.57%	0
Democratic Party	PD	13	10	15	13	8	7	19	16	46	44	13	204	0.29%	0
National Labour Party	PLN	9	7	14	18	11	5	22	7	42	28	6	169	0.24%	0
Valid votes		4,205	3,356	5,547	6,309	2,421	2,497	9,708	3,674	14,510	11,881	5,783	69,891	100.00%	5
Blank votes		74	76	77	92	68	51	89	106	275	220	69	1,197	1.62%	
Rejected votes – other		294	133	312	205	64	74	242	185	719	591	118	2,937	3.97%	
Total polled		4,573	3,565	5,936	6,606	2,553	2,622	10,039	3,965	15,504	12,692	5,970	74,025	83.69%	
Registered electors		5,347	4,462	7,124	7,705	3,206	3,254	11,768	5,101	18,673	14,873	6,938	88,451		
Turnout		85.52%	79.90%	83.32%	85.74%	79.63%	80.58%	85.31%	77.73%	83.03%	85.34%	86.05%	83.69%		

The following candidates were elected: Omar Arrieta Fonseca (CU); Miguel Ángel Chavarría Méndez (PLN); Álvaro Cubillo Aguilar (CU); Ana Ortega Matarrita (PLN); and Mario Rivas Muñoz (CU).

===== 1974 =====
Results of the 1974 general election held on 3 February 1974:

Party		Votes per canton											Total votes	%	Seats
Party		Aban- gares	Bagaces	Cañas	Carrillo	Hojan- cha	La Cruz	Liberia	Nanda- yure	Nicoya	Santa Cruz	Tilarán	Total votes	%	Seats
National Liberation Party	PLN	1,334	1,372	1,709	2,497	1,440	1,036	3,273	1,886	5,673	4,639	1,886	26,745	46.04%	3
National Unification Party	PUN	495	495	1,441	1,173	325	478	1,691	831	3,066	2,875	1,022	13,892	23.92%	2
National Independent Party	PNI	554	324	393	378	195	115	553	400	1,453	653	1,044	6,062	10.44%	1
National Republican Party	PRN	50	109	404	109	130	35	106	127	1,797	473	56	3,396	5.85%	0
Democratic Renewal Party	PRD	1,114	353	177	159	17	104	211	59	141	206	405	2,946	5.07%	0
Christian Democratic Party	PDC	18	37	22	693	14	24	802	42	108	760	23	2,543	4.38%	0
Socialist Action Party	PASO	40	84	122	153	20	47	600	52	288	447	24	1,877	3.23%	0
Democratic Party	PD	15	19	15	19	6	4	48	10	58	51	13	258	0.44%	0
Independent Party	PI	12	17	14	15	3	7	21	13	48	34	11	195	0.34%	0
Costa Rican Socialist Party	PSC	10	12	19	14	2	2	27	15	25	38	11	175	0.30%	0
Valid votes		3,642	2,822	4,316	5,210	2,152	1,852	7,332	3,435	12,657	10,176	4,495	58,089	100.00%	6
Blank votes		98	111	97	76	53	45	105	118	269	248	113	1,333	2.13%	
Rejected votes – other		192	120	237	336	114	51	261	179	810	723	91	3,114	4.98%	
Total polled		3,932	3,053	4,650	5,622	2,319	1,948	7,698	3,732	13,736	11,147	4,699	62,536	81.64%	
Registered electors		4,799	4,140	5,731	6,628	3,134	2,464	9,023	4,922	16,606	13,170	5,980	76,597		
Turnout		81.93%	73.74%	81.14%	84.82%	73.99%	79.06%	85.32%	75.82%	82.72%	84.64%	78.58%	81.64%		

The following candidates were elected: José Angulo Rojas (PLN); Luis Ángel Cárdenas Orias (PNI); Enrique Montiel Gutiérrez (PLN); Rolando Rodríguez Varela (PUN); Guillermo Vargas Sanabria (PLN); and Edwin Viales Marín (PUN).

===== 1970 =====
Results of the 1970 general election held on 1 February 1970:

Party		Votes per canton									Total votes	%	Seats
Party		Aban- gares	Bagaces	Cañas	Carrillo	Liberia	Nanda- yure	Nicoya	Santa Cruz	Tilarán	Total votes	%	Seats
National Liberation Party	PLN	1,727	1,631	1,758	2,450	3,789	1,893	6,861	4,281	2,032	26,422	53.96%	3
National Unification Party	PUN	1,384	804	1,445	1,734	2,496	1,003	3,905	3,782	1,800	18,353	37.48%	3
National Front Party	PFN	69	83	43	52	196	221	1,080	227	22	1,993	4.07%	0
Socialist Action Party	PASO	33	16	35	40	220	23	190	149	11	717	1.46%	0
National Union Party	PUN	26	44	300	16	38	18	69	42	90	643	1.31%	0
Costa Rican Renewal Movement	MRC	7	12	7	206	69	6	37	87	6	437	0.89%	0
Christian Democratic Party	PDC	14	7	14	5	78	13	236	24	13	404	0.83%	0
Valid votes		3,260	2,597	3,602	4,503	6,886	3,177	12,378	8,592	3,974	48,969	100.00%	6
Blank votes		65	56	55	33	78	140	275	150	81	933	1.78%	
Rejected votes – other		123	153	228	189	192	210	797	383	160	2,435	4.65%	
Total polled		3,448	2,806	3,885	4,725	7,156	3,527	13,450	9,125	4,215	52,337	83.62%	
Registered electors		4,118	3,657	4,678	5,287	8,374	4,537	16,207	10,434	5,295	62,587		
Turnout		83.73%	76.73%	83.05%	89.37%	85.45%	77.74%	82.99%	87.45%	79.60%	83.62%		

The following candidates were elected: Rosa Aiza Carrillo (PLN); Pedro Aráuz Aguilar (PUN); Jorge Bonilla Dib (PUN); José Bonilla Dib (PLN); Rodrigo Brenes González (PUN); and Asdrúbal Ocampo Ocampo (PLN).

==== 1960s ====
===== 1966 =====
Results of the 1966 general election held on 6 February 1966:

Party		Votes per canton									Total votes	%	Seats
Party		Aban- gares	Bagaces	Cañas	Carrillo	Liberia	Nanda- yure	Nicoya	Santa Cruz	Tilarán	Total votes	%	Seats
National Liberation Party	PLN	1,070	1,031	1,322	1,645	2,649	1,776	5,679	3,437	1,619	20,228	51.51%	3
National Unification Party	PUN	1,083	761	1,530	1,182	1,994	838	3,326	2,930	1,589	15,233	38.79%	3
Revolutionary Civic Union	UCR	103	125	64	411	531	56	295	417	170	2,172	5.53%	0
Guanacastecan Republican Party	PRG	22	15	20	31	59	181	809	373	19	1,529	3.89%	0
Democratic Party	PD	4	9	9	9	11	4	21	25	13	105	0.27%	0
Valid votes		2,282	1,941	2,945	3,278	5,244	2,855	10,130	7,182	3,410	39,267	100.00%	6
Blank votes		42	60	41	47	70	85	231	148	73	797	1.85%	
Rejected votes – other		225	179	148	308	311	295	889	580	197	3,132	7.25%	
Total polled		2,549	2,180	3,134	3,633	5,625	3,235	11,250	7,910	3,680	43,196	82.53%	
Registered electors		3,225	2,998	3,773	4,130	6,586	4,055	13,591	9,208	4,771	52,337		
Turnout		79.04%	72.72%	83.06%	87.97%	85.41%	79.78%	82.78%	85.90%	77.13%	82.53%		

The following candidates were elected: Armando Aráuz Aguilar (PLN); Mario Arredondo Calderón (PUN); Pedro Ferrandino Calvo (PUN); Noel Hernández Madrigal (PLN); Francisco Morales Morales (PLN); and Ovidio Murillo Murillo (PUN).

===== 1962 =====
Results of the 1962 general election held on 4 February 1962:

Party		Votes per canton								Total votes	%	Seats
Party		Aban- gares	Bagaces	Cañas	Carrillo	Liberia	Nicoya	Santa Cruz	Tilarán	Total votes	%	Seats
National Liberation Party	PLN	895	921	1,066	1,592	2,237	5,067	3,448	1,613	16,839	52.27%	3
Republican Party	PR	485	385	1,029	1,128	1,503	3,258	2,338	251	10,377	32.21%	2
National Union Party	PUN	658	204	125	201	273	942	451	990	3,844	11.93%	1
Guanacastecan Independent Union	UGI	42	40	91	37	29	553	71	40	903	2.80%	0
Popular Democratic Action	PADP	20	11	17	6	39	109	45	8	255	0.79%	0
Valid votes		2,100	1,561	2,328	2,964	4,081	9,929	6,353	2,902	32,218	100.00%	6
Blank votes		62	57	63	52	77	222	342	73	948	2.78%	
Rejected votes – other		65	62	70	43	55	337	195	75	902	2.65%	
Total polled		2,227	1,680	2,461	3,059	4,213	10,488	6,890	3,050	34,068	77.71%	
Registered electors		3,138	2,398	3,170	3,677	4,968	13,952	8,371	4,168	43,842		
Turnout		70.97%	70.06%	77.63%	83.19%	84.80%	75.17%	82.31%	73.18%	77.71%		

The following candidates were elected: Saúl Cárdenas Cubillo (PUN); Álvaro Cubillo Aguilar (PR); Danilo Flores Cárdenas (PLN); José Joaquín Muñoz Bustos (PR); Constantino Ocampo Alvarado (PLN); and Marcos Villalobos Campos (PLN).

==== 1950s ====
===== 1958 =====
Results of the 1958 general election held on 2 February 1958:

Party		Votes per canton								Total votes	%	Seats
Party		Aban- gares	Bagaces	Cañas	Carrillo	Liberia	Nicoya	Santa Cruz	Tilarán	Total votes	%	Seats
National Liberation Party	PLN	839	433	475	881	887	2,710	1,480	1,017	8,722	46.41%	3
National Union Party	PUN	563	156	106	627	543	1,252	915	541	4,703	25.02%	1
National Republican Party	PRN	192	132	474	196	315	793	1,027	211	3,340	17.77%	1
Independent Party	PI	53	52	83	230	217	583	370	59	1,647	8.76%	0
Revolutionary Civic Union	UCR	6	4	4	16	12	36	97	1	176	0.94%	0
Democratic Party	PD	9	6	9	8	9	38	29	9	117	0.62%	0
Democratic Opposition Movement	MDO	7	1	10	11	6	27	17	10	89	0.47%	0
Valid votes		1,669	784	1,161	1,969	1,989	5,439	3,935	1,848	18,794	100.00%	5
Blank votes		38	29	40	41	38	223	152	64	625	2.95%	
Rejected votes – other		103	53	228	132	129	550	444	118	1,757	8.30%	
Total polled		1,810	866	1,429	2,142	2,156	6,212	4,531	2,030	21,176	65.56%	
Registered electors		2,792	1,455	2,270	2,822	3,098	10,327	6,132	3,404	32,300		
Turnout		64.83%	59.52%	62.95%	75.90%	69.59%	60.15%	73.89%	59.64%	65.56%		

The following candidates were elected: Rosa Alpina Aiza Carrillo (PLN); Luis Brenes Gutiérrez (PRN); Noel Hernández Madrigal (PLN); David Hurtado Rivera (PUN); and José Ángel Jara Chavarría (PLN).

===== 1953 =====
Results of the 1953 general election held on 26 July 1953:

Party		Votes per canton								Total votes	%	Seats
Party		Aban- gares	Bagaces	Cañas	Carrillo	Liberia	Nicoya	Santa Cruz	Tilarán	Total votes	%	Seats
National Liberation Party	PLN	731	326	586	633	897	2,122	1,665	977	7,937	53.25%	3
Democratic Party	PD	346	164	559	388	477	1,695	1,455	277	5,361	35.97%	2
National Union Party	PUN	73	41	47	147	172	596	239	293	1,608	10.79%	0
Valid votes		1,150	531	1,192	1,168	1,546	4,413	3,359	1,547	14,906	100.00%	5
Blank votes		47	37	30	55	44	267	139	95	714	4.18%	
Rejected votes – other		87	45	89	91	101	570	309	152	1,444	8.46%	
Total polled		1,284	613	1,311	1,314	1,691	5,250	3,807	1,794	17,064	63.95%	
Registered electors		2,178	1,007	1,963	2,187	2,593	8,708	5,131	2,915	26,682		
Turnout		58.95%	60.87%	66.79%	60.08%	65.21%	60.29%	74.20%	61.54%	63.95%		

The following candidates were elected: Sergio Cubillo Aguilar (PD); Rafael Hurtado Aguirre (PD); Manuel Antonio Mora Rodríguez (PLN); Carlos Alberto Salazar Baldioceda (PLN); and Eugenio Vargas Ugalde (PLN).

==== 1940s ====
===== 1949 =====
The following candidates were elected at the 1949 general election held on 4 October 1949: Pastor Arrieta González (PUN); Alberto Flores Orozco (PUN); Pánfilo Quesada Rodríguez (PUN); Manuel Rodríguez Caracas (PC); and Hernán Vargas Castro (PUN).
