= Puntarenas (Legislative Assembly constituency) =

Constituency in Costa Rica

- Constituency for the Legislative Assembly of Costa Rica
- Location of Puntarenas within Costa Rica
- Province: Puntarenas
- Population: 500,166 (2022)
- Electorate: 332,865 (2022)
- Area: 11,299 km^{2} (2024)

Current Constituency
- Created: 1949
- Seats: List: 5 (2002–present); 6 (1986–2002); 7 (1966–1986); 6 (1962–1966); 5 (1953–1962); 4 (1949–1953)
- Deputies: List: Alexander Barrantes Chacón (PPSD); José Francisco Nicolás Alvarado (PLN); Sonia Rojas Méndez (PLN); Carlos Andrés Robles Obando (PUSC); David Lorenzo Segura Gamboa (PNR)

Puntarenas is one of the seven multi-member constituencies of the Legislative Assembly, the national legislature of Costa Rica. The constituency was established in 1949 when the Legislative Assembly was established by the modified constitution imposed by the Figueres dictatorship. It is conterminous with the province of Puntarenas. The constituency currently elects five of the 57 members of the Legislative Assembly using the closed party-list proportional representation electoral system. At the 2022 general election it had 332,865 registered electors.

== Electoral system ==
Puntarenas currently elects five of the 57 members of the Legislative Assembly using the closed party-list proportional representation electoral system. Seats are allocated using the largest remainder method using the Hare quota (cociente). Only parties that receive at least 50% of the Hare quota (subcociente) compete for remainder seats. Any seats remaining unfilled after allocation using the quotient system are distributed amongst parties that surpassed the subcociente, is descending order of their total votes in the constituency. The latter process is repeated until all the seats in the constituency are filled.

== Election results ==
=== Summary ===
Election	United People PU / IU / CC2000 / PASO			Broad Front FA			Citizens' Action PAC			National Republican PRN / PR / PRI / PC			National Liberation PLN / PSD			Social Christian Unity PUSC / CU / PDC			National Unification PUN / PUN			National Integration PIN			Libertarian Movement PML			Social Democratic Progress PPSD			National Restoration PRN		
Election	Votes	%	Seats	Votes	%	Seats	Votes	%	Seats	Votes	%	Seats	Votes	%	Seats	Votes	%	Seats	Votes	%	Seats	Votes	%	Seats	Votes	%	Seats	Votes	%	Seats	Votes	%	Seats
2022	338	0.21%	0	8,557	5.36%	0	4,549	2.85%	0				36,687	23.00%	2	21,852	13.70%	1				1,583	0.99%	0	934	0.59%	0	18,406	11.54%	1	7,722	4.84%	0
2018				5,129	3.05%	0	15,586	9.28%	0				36,257	21.59%	2	24,071	14.33%	1				15,519	9.24%	0	5,743	3.42%	0				41,795	24.88%	2
2014				23,975	14.79%	1	20,778	12.82%	1				46,168	28.48%	2	24,811	15.31%	1				1,726	1.06%	0	14,556	8.98%	0				6,800	4.20%	0
2010				3,303	2.22%	0	21,181	14.26%	1				58,985	39.71%	2	20,444	13.76%	1				1,428	0.96%	0	27,645	18.61%	1						
2006	406	0.33%	0				22,684	18.60%	1				54,559	44.73%	2	14,969	12.27%	1				345	0.28%	0	12,216	10.02%	1						
2002	991	0.83%	0				15,496	12.93%	1				35,659	29.76%	1	45,338	37.83%	2				527	0.44%	0	11,995	10.01%	1						
1998	1,848	1.60%	0										37,377	32.42%	2	58,225	50.50%	4				1,115	0.97%	0	4,556	3.95%	0						
1994													58,519	45.81%	3	55,733	43.63%	3															
1990	3,503	2.96%	0										45,297	38.30%	3	58,986	49.87%	3															
1986	2,260	2.16%	0										47,191	45.08%	3	46,242	44.17%	3															
1982	7,308	8.57%	1										47,506	55.72%	4	24,424	28.65%	2															
1978	6,698	8.88%	1										28,881	38.30%	3	29,899	39.65%	3	3,222	4.27%	0												
1974	4,492	7.34%	1							3,464	5.66%	0	23,427	38.26%	3	836	1.37%	0	18,249	29.81%	2												
1970	3,056	6.24%	0										23,194	47.38%	4	342	0.70%	0	19,640	40.12%	3												
1966													15,852	44.19%	3				18,101	50.46%	4												
1962										12,360	40.11%	2	13,226	42.92%	3				3,730	12.10%	1												
1958										4,386	26.90%	2	6,394	39.21%	2				4,058	24.89%	1												
1953													7,810	59.14%	3				647	4.90%	0												
1949												0			0						3												

=== Detailed ===
==== 2020s ====
===== 2022 =====
Results of the 2022 general election held on 6 February 2022:

Party		Votes per canton											Total votes	%	Seats
Party		Buenos Aires	Corre- dores	Coto Brus	Esparza	Gara- bito	Golfito	Montes de Oro	Osa	Parrita	Punta- renas	Quepos	Total votes	%	Seats
National Liberation Party	PLN	5,012	3,424	3,127	3,258	1,800	2,634	1,205	2,220	2,008	10,411	1,588	36,687	23.00%	2
New Republic Party	PNR	2,221	4,218	1,728	2,126	499	3,006	1,152	1,739	1,342	7,122	1,447	26,600	16.67%	1
Social Christian Unity Party	PUSC	1,219	1,842	1,585	2,013	797	1,476	753	1,072	842	6,624	3,629	21,852	13.70%	1
Social Democratic Progress Party	PPSD	2,961	1,571	1,308	1,987	986	1,403	866	1,503	673	4,147	1,001	18,406	11.54%	1
Broad Front	FA	666	796	737	1,144	336	793	359	406	195	2,829	296	8,557	5.36%	0
National Restoration Party	PRN	1,322	1,076	478	310	135	705	85	304	210	2,703	394	7,722	4.84%	0
Christian Democratic Alliance	ADC	460	355	4,366	118	375	216	18	124	31	357	62	6,482	4.06%	0
Social Christian Republican Party	PRSC	367	154	223	121	51	465	33	2,520	257	362	117	4,670	2.93%	0
Citizens' Action Party	PAC	175	207	182	241	82	232	1,119	210	94	1,881	126	4,549	2.85%	0
Progressive Liberal Party	PLP	340	286	202	665	403	218	156	165	139	1,348	198	4,120	2.58%	0
New Generation Party	PNG	223	151	61	426	107	71	97	93	90	2,341	203	3,863	2.42%	0
A Just Costa Rica	CRJ	287	210	110	270	57	144	59	122	72	1,332	228	2,891	1.81%	0
National Integration Party	PIN	112	163	80	81	31	121	27	57	45	684	182	1,583	0.99%	0
National Encounter Party	PEN	102	91	58	36	12	898	11	118	31	155	28	1,540	0.97%	0
Costa Rican Social Justice Party	JSC	93	246	99	158	29	85	27	59	29	637	63	1,525	0.96%	0
National Force Party	PFN	106	194	124	78	41	181	18	87	31	319	71	1,250	0.78%	0
Our People Party	PNP	40	342	38	71	31	131	43	37	22	474	15	1,244	0.78%	0
Accessibility without Exclusion	PASE	92	108	81	128	54	93	43	58	46	303	74	1,080	0.68%	0
Liberal Union Party	UL	128	98	176	83	51	80	34	84	51	224	49	1,058	0.66%	0
Libertarian Movement	PML	196	42	75	63	28	66	33	92	35	267	37	934	0.59%	0
Costa Rican Social; Democratic Movement	PMSDC	76	82	121	176	16	54	29	42	13	200	18	827	0.52%	0
United We Can	UP	55	199	76	89	49	64	15	39	20	139	23	768	0.48%	0
Costa Rican Democratic Union	PUCD	54	40	271	25	5	37	4	30	19	88	48	621	0.39%	0
Workers' Party	PT	52	35	31	23	15	29	10	18	17	106	24	360	0.23%	0
United People	PU	77	43	27	12	13	27	2	24	9	88	16	338	0.21%	0
Valid votes		16,436	15,973	15,364	13,702	6,003	13,229	6,198	11,223	6,321	45,141	9,937	159,527	100.00%	5
Blank votes		299	260	292	100	73	232	73	166	111	429	137	2,172	1.32%	
Rejected votes – other		255	268	281	163	74	256	78	195	84	637	105	2,396	1.46%	
Total polled		16,990	16,501	15,937	13,965	6,150	13,717	6,349	11,584	6,516	46,207	10,179	164,095	49.30%	
Registered electors		34,086	36,286	32,411	24,333	13,521	31,565	10,838	24,398	13,183	91,070	21,174	332,865		
Turnout		49.84%	45.47%	49.17%	57.39%	45.48%	43.46%	58.58%	47.48%	49.43%	50.74%	48.07%	49.30%		

The following candidates were elected: Alexander Barrantes Chacón (PPSD); José Francisco Nicolás Alvarado (PLN); Sonia Rojas Méndez (PLN); Carlos Andrés Robles Obando (PUSC); and David Lorenzo Segura Gamboa (PNR).

==== 2010s ====
===== 2018 =====
Results of the 2018 general election held on 4 February 2018:

Party		Votes per canton											Total votes	%	Seats
Party		Aguirre	Buenos Aires	Corre- dores	Coto Brus	Esparza	Gara- bito	Golfito	Montes de Oro	Osa	Parrita	Punta- renas	Total votes	%	Seats
National Restoration Party	PRN	2,776	3,883	4,569	3,124	3,733	1,166	4,222	1,776	3,264	2,120	11,162	41,795	24.88%	2
National Liberation Party	PLN	2,121	3,664	5,655	3,519	3,258	1,567	2,900	1,011	2,206	1,948	8,408	36,257	21.59%	2
Social Christian Unity Party	PUSC	1,591	2,531	2,214	1,857	2,142	1,040	1,677	944	1,112	1,051	7,912	24,071	14.33%	1
Citizens' Action Party	PAC	800	1,037	1,064	1,120	1,468	613	1,600	966	819	411	5,688	15,586	9.28%	0
National Integration Party	PIN	983	1,400	1,123	659	1,235	684	1,242	431	1,098	481	6,183	15,519	9.24%	0
Social Christian Republican Party	PRSC	268	573	320	334	850	158	640	203	1,033	196	3,105	7,680	4.57%	0
Libertarian Movement	PML	202	495	347	2,854	162	308	322	130	164	137	622	5,743	3.42%	0
Broad Front	FA	143	550	516	271	880	151	652	146	313	146	1,361	5,129	3.05%	0
Costa Rican Renewal Party	PRC	126	941	477	149	109	45	193	642	295	60	1,282	4,319	2.57%	0
New Generation Party	PNG	1,050	595	197	127	373	104	135	159	176	110	1,122	4,148	2.47%	0
Christian Democratic Alliance	ADC	131	261	435	645	152	49	381	85	470	100	550	3,259	1.94%	0
Progressive Liberal Party	PLP	44	161	91	1,297	35	27	59	12	30	23	134	1,913	1.14%	0
Accessibility without Exclusion	PASE	123	187	145	108	141	58	160	156	112	45	527	1,762	1.05%	0
Workers' Party	PT	43	87	83	76	56	24	107	19	62	30	203	790	0.47%	0
Valid votes		10,401	16,365	17,236	16,140	14,594	5,994	14,290	6,680	11,154	6,858	48,259	167,971	100.00%	5
Blank votes		94	179	160	167	69	39	169	52	93	63	311	1,396	0.81%	
Rejected votes – other		184	298	335	323	169	93	313	85	256	127	775	2,958	1.72%	
Total polled		10,679	16,842	17,731	16,630	14,832	6,126	14,772	6,817	11,503	7,048	49,345	172,325	55.47%	
Registered electors		19,595	31,975	34,163	29,923	22,598	11,771	29,563	10,241	22,210	12,052	86,571	310,662		
Turnout		54.50%	52.67%	51.90%	55.58%	65.63%	52.04%	49.97%	66.57%	51.79%	58.48%	57.00%	55.47%		

The following candidates were elected: Óscar Mauricio Cascante Cascante (PUSC); Carmen Irene Chan Mora (PRN); Franggi Nicolás Solano (PLN); Melvin Núñez Piña (PRN); and Gustavo Alonso Viales Villegas (PLN).

===== 2014 =====
Results of the 2014 general election held on 2 February 2014:

Party		Votes per canton											Total votes	%	Seats
Party		Aguirre	Buenos Aires	Corre- dores	Coto Brus	Esparza	Gara- bito	Golfito	Montes de Oro	Osa	Parrita	Punta- renas	Total votes	%	Seats
National Liberation Party	PLN	2,054	4,572	4,201	4,760	4,393	1,825	3,345	1,992	2,713	1,704	14,609	46,168	28.48%	2
Social Christian Unity Party	PUSC	1,870	2,220	1,854	2,740	1,870	892	1,985	660	964	1,726	8,030	24,811	15.31%	1
Broad Front	FA	712	2,079	2,668	2,375	2,203	481	2,606	1,154	1,655	242	7,800	23,975	14.79%	1
Citizens' Action Party	PAC	759	1,638	3,588	2,404	1,945	631	1,392	1,028	1,341	359	5,693	20,778	12.82%	1
Libertarian Movement	PML	949	1,367	878	505	1,699	643	680	447	1,253	1,133	5,002	14,556	8.98%	0
National Restoration Party	PRN	598	655	789	686	340	163	978	461	536	201	1,393	6,800	4.20%	0
Accessibility without Exclusion	PASE	1,955	614	292	266	351	71	307	190	703	368	1,209	6,326	3.90%	0
Costa Rican Renewal Party	PRC	375	511	1,168	573	340	56	328	164	401	201	1,243	5,360	3.31%	0
Viva Puntarenas	VP	146	565	225	423	191	51	1,265	104	392	143	912	4,417	2.73%	0
New Generation Party	PNG	34	1,570	39	120	52	22	65	17	52	15	154	2,140	1.32%	0
National Integration Party	PIN	76	89	57	42	81	7	67	152	71	29	1,055	1,726	1.06%	0
New Homeland Party	PPN	51	121	93	100	151	30	123	59	242	36	456	1,462	0.90%	0
Homeland, Equality and Democracy Party of Puntarenas	PID	35	256	69	24	82	5	521	15	285	21	63	1,376	0.85%	0
National Advance	PAN	61	49	80	50	102	249	193	24	57	21	288	1,174	0.72%	0
Workers' Party	PT	54	97	113	72	58	29	94	20	80	36	364	1,017	0.63%	0
Valid votes		9,729	16,403	16,114	15,140	13,858	5,155	13,949	6,487	10,745	6,235	48,271	162,086	100.00%	5
Blank votes		82	189	197	201	67	45	177	63	135	59	356	1,571	0.94%	
Rejected votes – other		200	401	451	399	218	131	467	114	334	153	986	3,854	2.30%	
Total polled		10,011	16,993	16,762	15,740	14,143	5,331	14,593	6,664	11,214	6,447	49,613	167,511	58.31%	
Registered electors		18,025	29,985	31,122	27,667	20,599	9,856	27,210	9,616	20,090	10,844	82,240	287,254		
Turnout		55.54%	56.67%	53.86%	56.89%	68.66%	54.09%	53.63%	69.30%	55.82%	59.45%	60.33%	58.31%		

The following candidates were elected: Laura María Garro Sánchez (PAC); Carlos Enrique Hernández Álvarez (FA); Olivier Ibo Jiménez Rojas (PLN); Karla Vanessa Prendas Matarrita (PLN); and Gerardo Vargas Rojas (PUSC).

===== 2010 =====
Results of the 2010 general election held on 7 February 2010:

Party		Votes per canton											Total votes	%	Seats
Party		Aguirre	Buenos Aires	Corre- dores	Coto Brus	Esparza	Gara- bito	Golfito	Montes de Oro	Osa	Parrita	Punta- renas	Total votes	%	Seats
National Liberation Party	PLN	3,568	6,555	5,250	4,940	5,239	2,522	5,479	2,047	4,395	2,080	16,910	58,985	39.71%	2
Libertarian Movement	PML	1,934	2,379	2,224	1,928	2,265	851	2,338	1,050	2,187	2,447	8,042	27,645	18.61%	1
Citizens' Action Party	PAC	1,011	3,298	2,861	1,997	1,693	431	2,093	1,155	1,354	320	4,968	21,181	14.26%	1
Social Christian Unity Party	PUSC	1,198	894	926	3,519	1,957	768	1,336	659	793	434	7,960	20,444	13.76%	1
Accessibility without Exclusion	PASE	469	736	564	1,116	602	156	458	271	449	81	2,679	7,581	5.10%	0
Costa Rican Renewal Party	PRC	714	340	1,142	190	311	65	319	158	768	448	1,881	6,336	4.27%	0
Broad Front	FA	81	370	331	158	191	65	398	57	191	27	1,434	3,303	2.22%	0
Patriotic Alliance	AP	93	178	657	70	49	13	146	110	90	13	205	1,624	1.09%	0
National Integration Party	PIN	51	56	64	34	98	23	53	41	52	20	936	1,428	0.96%	0
Valid votes		9,119	14,806	14,019	13,952	12,405	4,894	12,620	5,548	10,279	5,870	45,015	148,527	100.00%	5
Blank votes		202	389	252	288	113	83	284	133	242	92	553	2,631	1.70%	
Rejected votes – other		208	319	443	351	168	122	326	97	274	171	892	3,371	2.18%	
Total polled		9,529	15,514	14,714	14,591	12,686	5,099	13,230	5,778	10,795	6,133	46,460	154,529	59.57%	
Registered electors		16,283	26,649	27,134	25,753	18,283	8,457	24,375	8,556	18,252	9,503	76,163	259,408		
Turnout		58.52%	58.22%	54.23%	56.66%	69.39%	60.29%	54.28%	67.53%	59.14%	64.54%	61.00%	59.57%		

The following candidates were elected: Jorge Alberto Angulo Mora (PLN); Adonay Enríquez Guevara (PML); Jorge Alberto Gamboa Corrales (PAC); Agnes Gómez Franceschi (PLN); and Rodolfo Sotomayor Aguilar (PUSC).

==== 2000s ====
===== 2006 =====
Results of the 2006 general election held on 5 February 2006:

Party		Votes per canton											Total votes	%	Seats
Party		Aguirre	Buenos Aires	Corre- dores	Coto Brus	Esparza	Gara- bito	Golfito	Montes de Oro	Osa	Parrita	Punta- renas	Total votes	%	Seats
National Liberation Party	PLN	3,469	5,352	6,341	4,685	3,922	2,163	4,636	2,012	3,280	2,809	15,890	54,559	44.73%	2
Citizens' Action Party	PAC	1,094	2,996	2,281	2,681	1,886	491	2,237	1,082	1,478	381	6,077	22,684	18.60%	1
Social Christian Unity Party	PUSC	1,013	900	698	1,081	2,542	494	873	603	1,341	750	4,674	14,969	12.27%	1
Libertarian Movement	PML	650	1,067	750	1,476	871	249	750	860	718	593	4,232	12,216	10.02%	1
Costa Rican Renewal Party	PRC	330	534	1,524	831	295	62	670	150	382	126	1,706	6,610	5.42%	0
Union for Change Party	PUPC	149	136	115	93	284	54	290	72	46	20	1,401	2,660	2.18%	0
Democratic Force	FD	65	43	50	54	381	36	57	33	40	12	1,205	1,976	1.62%	0
Homeland First Party	PPP	72	197	168	137	211	42	171	51	111	13	766	1,939	1.59%	0
National Union Party	PUN	45	80	49	90	204	24	59	66	66	14	898	1,595	1.31%	0
Democratic Nationalist Alliance	ADN	48	161	471	155	15	5	175	7	28	6	114	1,185	0.97%	0
Patriotic Union	UP	28	228	46	34	19	7	65	4	204	8	184	827	0.68%	0
United Left	IU	12	36	73	37	12	4	84	9	35	9	95	406	0.33%	0
National Integration Party	PIN	17	33	39	37	18	3	25	14	31	8	120	345	0.28%	0
Valid votes		6,992	11,763	12,605	11,391	10,660	3,634	10,092	4,963	7,760	4,749	37,362	121,971	100.00%	5
Blank votes		134	221	187	209	74	58	186	95	120	56	372	1,712	1.35%	
Rejected votes – other		176	314	430	408	188	86	364	102	292	102	961	3,423	2.69%	
Total polled		7,302	12,298	13,222	12,008	10,922	3,778	10,642	5,160	8,172	4,907	38,695	127,106	54.90%	
Registered electors		13,876	23,040	24,035	24,290	15,952	6,809	22,116	7,548	16,321	7,856	69,668	231,511		
Turnout		52.62%	53.38%	55.01%	49.44%	68.47%	55.49%	48.12%	68.36%	50.07%	62.46%	55.54%	54.90%		

The following candidates were elected: Olivier Ibo Jiménez Rojas (PLN); Xinia Nicolás Alvarado (PLN); Mario Alberto Núñez Arias (PML); Olivier Pérez González (PAC); and Bienvenido Venegas Porras (PUSC).

===== 2002 =====
Results of the 2002 general election held on 3 February 2002:

Party		Votes per canton											Total votes	%	Seats
Party		Aguirre	Buenos Aires	Corre- dores	Coto Brus	Esparza	Gara- bito	Golfito	Montes de Oro	Osa	Parrita	Punta- renas	Total votes	%	Seats
Social Christian Unity Party	PUSC	3,258	4,104	3,727	4,726	3,601	1,545	3,427	1,602	3,057	1,713	14,578	45,338	37.83%	2
National Liberation Party	PLN	1,653	3,936	3,134	3,748	2,889	1,184	2,898	1,321	2,200	1,353	11,343	35,659	29.76%	1
Citizens' Action Party	PAC	672	1,911	1,667	2,289	1,102	449	1,700	418	1,216	472	3,600	15,496	12.93%	1
Libertarian Movement	PML	395	1,004	811	636	1,392	380	878	798	647	367	4,687	11,995	10.01%	1
Costa Rican Renewal Party	PRC	130	305	1,725	324	131	24	580	26	777	233	827	5,082	4.24%	0
Democratic Force	FD	76	97	97	157	123	73	112	25	115	29	1,223	2,127	1.77%	0
Coalition Change 2000	CC2000	19	21	67	29	32	9	72	348	30	11	353	991	0.83%	0
National Patriotic Party	PPN	13	21	72	36	542	10	44	4	41	14	147	944	0.79%	0
National Christian Alliance	ANC	69	30	111	61	26	12	75	36	49	35	172	676	0.56%	0
National Integration Party	PIN	18	29	53	52	86	9	41	52	55	9	123	527	0.44%	0
National Rescue Party	PRN	20	25	24	42	25	5	127	5	37	11	131	452	0.38%	0
Independent Workers' Party	PIO	21	20	89	41	16	8	31	3	83	13	37	362	0.30%	0
General Union Party	PUGEN	11	30	22	26	13	2	16	7	20	7	39	193	0.16%	0
Valid votes		6,355	11,533	11,599	12,167	9,978	3,710	10,001	4,645	8,327	4,267	37,260	119,842	100.00%	5
Blank votes		128	285	318	327	128	81	258	93	211	82	549	2,460	1.95%	
Rejected votes – other		171	358	487	310	171	86	390	106	353	150	996	3,578	2.84%	
Total polled		6,654	12,176	12,404	12,804	10,277	3,877	10,649	4,844	8,891	4,499	38,805	125,880	61.00%	
Registered electors		11,600	19,506	21,073	22,753	13,966	5,812	20,095	6,728	15,209	6,952	62,655	206,349		
Turnout		57.36%	62.42%	58.86%	56.27%	73.59%	66.71%	52.99%	72.00%	58.46%	64.72%	61.93%	61.00%		

The following candidates were elected: Jorge Luis Álvarez Pérez (PUSC); Carlos Ricardo Benavides Jiménez (PLN); Peter Guevara Guth (PML); Miguel Huezo Arias (PUSC); and Daisy Quesada Calderón (PAC).

==== 1990s ====
===== 1998 =====
Results of the 1998 general election held on 1 February 1998:

Party		Votes per canton											Total votes	%	Seats
Party		Aguirre	Buenos Aires	Corre- dores	Coto Brus	Esparza	Gara- bito	Golfito	Montes de Oro	Osa	Parrita	Punta- renas	Total votes	%	Seats
Social Christian Unity Party	PUSC	3,416	5,394	5,934	6,132	4,215	1,626	5,319	2,450	4,496	2,271	16,972	58,225	50.50%	4
National Liberation Party	PLN	2,191	3,972	2,227	4,104	3,341	1,122	2,673	1,484	2,927	2,163	11,173	37,377	32.42%	2
Libertarian Movement	PML	55	57	122	620	419	181	283	270	52	21	2,476	4,556	3.95%	0
Democratic Force	FD	131	397	129	246	265	44	293	81	267	37	1,631	3,521	3.05%	0
New Democratic Party	NPD	144	276	1,074	194	51	5	741	6	236	25	76	2,828	2.45%	0
United People	PU	192	34	47	30	81	7	97	45	34	8	1,273	1,848	1.60%	0
National Christian Alliance	ANC	38	49	697	128	27	0	242	30	112	22	242	1,587	1.38%	0
Costa Rican Renewal Party	PRC	18	24	131	37	94	7	44	121	43	12	803	1,334	1.16%	0
National Integration Party	PIN	27	45	36	60	471	18	39	32	44	17	326	1,115	0.97%	0
Democratic Party	PD	14	43	81	356	54	3	17	40	15	10	169	802	0.70%	0
National Independent Party	PNI	27	22	15	23	31	12	17	10	17	48	532	754	0.65%	0
National Rescue Party	PRN	91	76	77	136	16	7	116	7	50	6	70	652	0.57%	0
General Union Party	PUGEN	14	220	33	41	20	3	36	4	37	11	95	514	0.45%	0
Independent Party	PI	6	9	17	13	10	3	11	1	62	2	49	183	0.16%	0
Valid votes		6,364	10,618	10,620	12,120	9,095	3,038	9,928	4,581	8,392	4,653	35,887	115,296	100.00%	6
Blank votes		91	223	168	260	74	35	221	59	126	60	378	1,695	1.40%	
Rejected votes – other		267	393	545	389	217	98	503	76	370	135	1,062	4,055	3.35%	
Total polled		6,722	11,234	11,333	12,769	9,386	3,171	10,652	4,716	8,888	4,848	37,327	121,046	65.28%	
Registered electors		10,475	17,431	18,822	21,166	12,070	4,308	18,538	6,152	14,391	6,583	55,502	185,438		
Turnout		64.17%	64.45%	60.21%	60.33%	77.76%	73.61%	57.46%	76.66%	61.76%	73.64%	67.25%	65.28%		

The following candidates were elected: Orlando Gerardo Báez Molina (PUSC); Ligia Mireya Castro Ulate (PUSC); Gerardo Antonio Medina Madriz (PUSC); Tobías Murillo Rodríguez (PLN); Danilo Ramírez Muñoz (PUSC); and Sonia Villalobos Barahona (PLN).

===== 1994 =====
Results of the 1994 general election held on 6 February 1994:

Party		Votes per canton											Total votes	%	Seats
Party		Aguirre	Buenos Aires	Corre- dores	Coto Brus	Esparza	Gara- bito	Golfito	Montes de Oro	Osa	Parrita	Punta- renas	Total votes	%	Seats
National Liberation Party	PLN	2,784	6,766	5,085	7,026	4,419	1,098	4,839	2,245	3,948	2,322	17,987	58,519	45.81%	3
Social Christian Unity Party	PUSC	2,533	4,808	5,041	6,191	4,609	1,171	4,809	1,931	4,332	2,162	18,146	55,733	43.63%	3
National Christian Alliance	ANC	204	220	706	450	138	23	460	406	310	131	1,200	4,248	3.33%	0
General Union Party	PUGEN	46	112	1,496	196	25	6	884	9	211	17	178	3,180	2.49%	0
People's Vanguard Party	PVP	1,021	113	145	115	48	15	278	22	101	69	682	2,609	2.04%	0
Democratic Force	FD	383	226	94	218	118	18	97	59	94	49	1,012	2,368	1.85%	0
National Independent Party	PNI	38	43	52	48	28	5	42	45	36	14	356	707	0.55%	0
Independent Party	PI	20	17	38	21	10	5	28	10	134	11	90	384	0.30%	0
Valid votes		7,029	12,305	12,657	14,265	9,395	2,341	11,437	4,727	9,166	4,775	39,651	127,748	100.00%	6
Blank votes		130	233	185	303	65	16	217	73	159	65	437	1,883	1.40%	
Rejected votes – other		304	434	631	478	175	99	666	145	487	154	1,254	4,827	3.59%	
Total polled		7,463	12,972	13,473	15,046	9,635	2,456	12,320	4,945	9,812	4,994	41,342	134,458	77.19%	
Registered electors		9,550	17,038	17,933	20,563	10,977	2,989	17,511	5,689	13,430	6,149	52,371	174,200		
Turnout		78.15%	76.14%	75.13%	73.17%	87.77%	82.17%	70.36%	86.92%	73.06%	81.22%	78.94%	77.19%		

The following candidates were elected: Mario Alfredo Álvarez González (PLN); Gonzalo Fajardo Salas (PUSC); Marlene Gómez Calderón (PUSC); Claudio Morera Ávila (PLN); Roberto Enrique Obando Venegas (PLN); and Bienvenido Venegas Porras (PUSC).

===== 1990 =====
Results of the 1990 general election held on 4 February 1990:

Party		Votes per canton											Total votes	%	Seats
Party		Aguirre	Buenos Aires	Corre- dores	Coto Brus	Esparza	Gara- bito	Golfito	Montes de Oro	Osa	Parrita	Punta- renas	Total votes	%	Seats
Social Christian Unity Party	PUSC	3,750	5,466	5,481	7,166	3,962	1,101	5,417	2,205	4,766	2,656	17,016	58,986	49.87%	3
National Liberation Party	PLN	2,378	5,147	3,272	6,987	3,218	763	3,180	1,752	3,241	1,502	13,857	45,297	38.30%	3
General Union Party	PUGEN	60	111	701	68	719	12	567	95	215	105	2,786	5,439	4.60%	0
United People	PU	167	165	576	148	125	13	519	25	298	64	1,403	3,503	2.96%	0
National Christian Alliance	ANC	97	144	401	199	123	61	222	178	140	97	1,057	2,719	2.30%	0
National Independent Party	PNI	39	70	618	75	38	11	207	17	96	30	270	1,471	1.24%	0
Independent Party	PI	3	21	47	9	6	3	275	2	19	15	59	459	0.39%	0
Party of Progress	PdP	15	21	18	20	147	5	40	3	24	8	95	396	0.33%	0
Valid votes		6,509	11,145	11,114	14,672	8,338	1,969	10,427	4,277	8,799	4,477	36,543	118,270	100.00%	6
Blank votes		109	224	197	249	53	30	186	59	165	79	372	1,723	1.38%	
Rejected votes – other		211	321	575	460	258	92	555	135	369	177	1,462	4,615	3.70%	
Total polled		6,829	11,690	11,886	15,381	8,649	2,091	11,168	4,471	9,333	4,733	38,377	124,608	76.43%	
Registered electors		8,906	15,539	16,355	19,913	9,843	2,567	16,262	5,270	13,310	5,982	49,080	163,027		
Turnout		76.68%	75.23%	72.68%	77.24%	87.87%	81.46%	68.68%	84.84%	70.12%	79.12%	78.19%	76.43%		

The following candidates were elected: Angelo Altamura Carriero (PUSC); Israel Ávila Castro (PLN); Otto Brenes León (PLN); Carlos Luis Rodríguez Hernández (PLN); Gerardo Enrique Rudín Arias (PUSC); and Noé Gerardo Vargas Castillo (PUSC).

==== 1980s ====
===== 1986 =====
Results of the 1986 general election held on 2 February 1986:

Party		Votes per canton											Total votes	%	Seats
Party		Aguirre	Buenos Aires	Corre- dores	Coto Brus	Esparza	Gara- bito	Golfito	Montes de Oro	Osa	Parrita	Punta- renas	Total votes	%	Seats
National Liberation Party	PLN	2,429	4,945	3,261	6,449	3,559	712	3,425	2,075	3,765	1,678	14,893	47,191	45.08%	3
Social Christian Unity Party	PUSC	2,693	3,781	3,218	5,252	3,706	698	4,150	1,753	3,710	1,981	15,300	46,242	44.17%	3
People's Alliance Coalition	CAP	263	224	783	204	117	12	373	28	332	55	869	3,260	3.11%	0
United People	PU	100	80	238	56	84	9	359	32	238	38	1,026	2,260	2.16%	0
National Democratic Party	PND	17	33	1,216	33	13	4	509	14	121	17	77	2,054	1.96%	0
National Christian Alliance	ANC	169	57	187	107	74	6	118	35	108	327	562	1,750	1.67%	0
National Republican Party	PNR	60	88	616	98	53	22	199	28	105	54	241	1,564	1.49%	0
General Union Party	PUGEN	10	41	27	15	4	5	192	3	26	6	30	359	0.34%	0
Valid votes		5,741	9,249	9,546	12,214	7,610	1,468	9,325	3,968	8,405	4,156	32,998	104,680	100.00%	6
Blank votes		108	151	184	241	60	12	167	67	165	66	368	1,589	1.44%	
Rejected votes – other		202	281	700	415	187	85	514	96	403	245	1,211	4,339	3.92%	
Total polled		6,051	9,681	10,430	12,870	7,857	1,565	10,006	4,131	8,973	4,467	34,577	110,608	75.96%	
Registered electors		7,878	13,183	14,496	16,780	8,931	1,875	14,755	4,829	13,187	5,655	44,040	145,609		
Turnout		76.81%	73.44%	71.95%	76.70%	87.97%	83.47%	67.81%	85.55%	68.04%	78.99%	78.51%	75.96%		

The following candidates were elected: Alfonso Estevanovich González (PLN); Carlos Luis Monge Sanabria (PLN); Omar Obando Suárez (PUSC); José Joaquín Solís Rodríguez (PLN); Rodolfo Enrique Sotomayor Guevara (PUSC); and Erlin Valderramos Bermúdez (PUSC).

===== 1982 =====
Results of the 1982 general election held on 7 February 1982:

Party		Votes per canton											Total votes	%	Seats
Party		Aguirre	Buenos Aires	Corre- dores	Coto Brus	Esparza	Gara- bito	Golfito	Montes de Oro	Osa	Parrita	Punta- renas	Total votes	%	Seats
National Liberation Party	PLN	2,720	3,824	4,061	5,399	3,460	637	3,535	1,847	3,867	2,210	15,946	47,506	55.72%	4
Unity Coalition	CU	1,974	1,739	1,704	2,280	2,366	332	2,073	1,046	1,909	1,176	7,825	24,424	28.65%	2
United People	PU	372	392	1,527	355	168	20	1,184	137	1,479	108	1,566	7,308	8.57%	1
National Movement	MN	73	334	330	211	69	51	381	118	233	47	840	2,687	3.15%	0
National Democratic Party	PND	27	47	522	54	181	7	227	30	58	8	574	1,735	2.04%	0
Authentic Puntarenense Party	PAP	28	33	57	34	34	6	44	35	40	19	706	1,036	1.22%	0
Democratic Party	PD	20	23	44	29	12	8	33	7	49	17	68	310	0.36%	0
Independent Party	PI	12	28	24	16	10	1	24	5	26	9	92	247	0.29%	0
Valid votes		5,226	6,420	8,269	8,378	6,300	1,062	7,501	3,225	7,661	3,594	27,617	85,253	100.00%	7
Blank votes		80	140	127	169	51	17	125	45	160	69	334	1,317	1.47%	
Rejected votes – other		187	222	415	277	125	31	384	74	328	148	894	3,085	3.44%	
Total polled		5,493	6,782	8,811	8,824	6,476	1,110	8,010	3,344	8,149	3,811	28,845	89,655	72.08%	
Registered electors		7,419	10,098	12,897	13,193	7,623	1,401	12,440	4,143	12,043	5,098	38,032	124,387		
Turnout		74.04%	67.16%	68.32%	66.88%	84.95%	79.23%	64.39%	80.71%	67.67%	74.75%	75.84%	72.08%		

The following candidates were elected: Carlos María Chajud Calvo (PLN); Arnoldo Ferreto (PU); Edgar Antonio Guardiola Mendoza (PLN); Claudio Guevara Barahona (CU); Tobías Murillo Rodríguez (PLN); Guillermo Salas Monge (PLN); and Jimmy Zúñiga Noguera (CU).

==== 1970s ====
===== 1978 =====
Results of the 1978 general election held on 5 February 1978:

Party		Votes per canton										Total votes	%	Seats
Party		Aguirre	Buenos Aires	Corre- dores	Coto Brus	Esparza	Golfito	Montes de Oro	Osa	Parrita	Punta- renas	Total votes	%	Seats
Unity Coalition	CU	1,780	2,676	2,362	2,811	2,612	2,655	1,244	2,809	1,645	9,305	29,899	39.65%	3
National Liberation Party	PLN	1,681	2,084	2,050	2,479	2,440	1,968	1,200	2,897	1,667	10,415	28,881	38.30%	3
United People	PU	555	294	1,512	217	187	920	145	1,392	166	1,310	6,698	8.88%	1
National Unification Party	PUN	765	156	184	202	53	673	118	206	139	726	3,222	4.27%	0
Costa Rican Peoples' Front	FPC	77	34	715	91	47	338	30	141	41	771	2,285	3.03%	0
Authentic Puntarenense Party	PAP	13	21	23	18	78	17	14	25	10	1,510	1,729	2.29%	0
Republican Union Party	PUR	115	31	63	166	24	84	22	65	33	280	883	1.17%	0
National Independent Party	PNI	25	270	42	26	25	19	10	33	14	327	791	1.05%	0
Independent Party	PI	50	31	35	34	30	35	26	48	24	395	708	0.94%	0
Democratic Party	PD	17	24	16	21	16	12	4	33	13	149	305	0.40%	0
Valid votes		5,078	5,621	7,002	6,065	5,512	6,721	2,813	7,649	3,752	25,188	75,401	100.00%	7
Blank votes		114	162	177	197	92	158	87	190	102	432	1,711	2.12%	
Rejected votes – other		282	282	463	276	173	377	121	405	192	1,180	3,751	4.64%	
Total polled		5,474	6,065	7,642	6,538	5,777	7,256	3,021	8,244	4,046	26,800	80,863	75.78%	
Registered electors		7,032	8,440	10,489	9,105	6,639	10,447	3,606	11,283	5,147	34,515	106,703		
Turnout		77.84%	71.86%	72.86%	71.81%	87.02%	69.46%	83.78%	73.07%	78.61%	77.65%	75.78%		

The following candidates were elected: Armando Arrieta Angulo (PLN); Mario Espinoza Sánchez (PLN); Eliécer Solís Ureña (CU); Guillermo Ulloa Varela (CU); Rodrigo Ureña Quirós (PU); Tobías Vargas Rojas (PLN); and Herbert Wolf Fournier (CU).

===== 1974 =====
Results of the 1974 general election held on 3 February 1974:

Party		Votes per canton									Total votes	%	Seats
Party		Aguirre	Buenos Aires	Coto Brus	Esparza	Golfito	Montes de Oro	Osa	Parrita	Punta- renas	Total votes	%	Seats
National Liberation Party	PLN	1,342	2,008	2,397	2,006	2,427	972	1,758	1,383	9,134	23,427	38.26%	3
National Unification Party	PUN	1,353	1,254	1,523	1,733	3,192	618	1,801	1,220	5,555	18,249	29.81%	2
National Independent Party	PNI	406	393	242	287	821	400	825	254	2,862	6,490	10.60%	1
Socialist Action Party	PASO	251	102	232	69	1,787	108	1,003	161	779	4,492	7.34%	1
National Republican Party	PRN	240	61	91	143	594	81	271	84	1,899	3,464	5.66%	0
Democratic Renewal Party	PRD	185	132	270	184	246	186	151	120	992	2,466	4.03%	0
Christian Democratic Party	PDC	359	11	28	34	78	27	33	57	209	836	1.37%	0
Democratic Party	PD	30	21	18	74	236	9	63	14	217	682	1.11%	0
Costa Rican Peoples' Front	FPC	23	14	33	8	173	24	37	17	153	482	0.79%	0
Independent Party	PI	25	30	26	9	40	9	40	14	153	346	0.57%	0
Costa Rican Socialist Party	PSC	12	27	13	6	37	7	22	7	161	292	0.48%	0
Valid votes		4,226	4,053	4,873	4,553	9,631	2,441	6,004	3,331	22,114	61,226	100.00%	7
Blank votes		126	136	143	92	265	80	201	98	462	1,603	2.45%	
Rejected votes – other		245	143	147	129	505	80	341	156	813	2,559	3.91%	
Total polled		4,597	4,332	5,163	4,774	10,401	2,601	6,546	3,585	23,389	65,388	73.89%	
Registered electors		6,086	6,290	7,364	5,533	15,300	3,263	9,505	4,690	30,465	88,496		
Turnout		75.53%	68.87%	70.11%	86.28%	67.98%	79.71%	68.87%	76.44%	76.77%	73.89%		

The following candidates were elected: Álvaro José Chen Lao (PNI); Fernando Cuadra Martínez (PLN); Arnoldo Ferreto (PASO); Santiago Herrera Granados (PUN); Emiliano Odio Madrigal (PUN); Carlos Luis Rodríguez Hernández (PLN); and Carlos Manuel Vicente Castro (PLN).

===== 1970 =====
Results of the 1970 general election held on 1 February 1970:

Party		Votes per canton								Total votes	%	Seats
Party		Aguirre	Buenos Aires	Coto Brus	Esparza	Golfito	Montes de Oro	Osa	Punta- renas	Total votes	%	Seats
National Liberation Party	PLN	2,937	1,835	2,079	1,865	2,769	1,089	1,945	8,675	23,194	47.38%	4
National Unification Party	PUN	2,375	869	1,140	1,699	3,615	947	1,848	7,147	19,640	40.12%	3
Socialist Action Party	PASO	354	40	123	70	909	97	514	949	3,056	6.24%	0
National Front Party	PFN	399	40	34	35	237	21	105	693	1,564	3.19%	0
Costa Rican Renewal Movement	MRC	29	8	11	21	81	10	18	366	544	1.11%	0
National Union Party	PUN	14	5	10	21	48	7	27	272	404	0.83%	0
Christian Democratic Party	PDC	23	10	44	24	35	10	12	184	342	0.70%	0
Puntarenense Renewal Party	PRP	28	2	10	8	56	3	25	76	208	0.42%	0
Valid votes		6,159	2,809	3,451	3,743	7,750	2,184	4,494	18,362	48,952	100.00%	7
Blank votes		216	70	113	60	205	59	198	385	1,306	2.47%	
Rejected votes – other		390	123	133	125	594	79	366	850	2,660	5.03%	
Total polled		6,765	3,002	3,697	3,928	8,549	2,322	5,058	19,597	52,918	76.82%	
Registered electors		8,735	4,128	4,906	4,393	12,041	2,773	7,325	24,584	68,885		
Turnout		77.45%	72.72%	75.36%	89.41%	71.00%	83.74%	69.05%	79.71%	76.82%		

The following candidates were elected: Daniel Barrantes Campos (PLN); Edgar Chaverri Solano (PUN); Pedro Gaspar Zúñiga (PLN); Mireya Guevara Fallas (PLN); Gonzalo Lizano Ramírez (PUN); Rafael París Steffens (PLN); and Gonzalo Segares García (PUN).

==== 1960s ====
===== 1966 =====
Results of the 1966 general election held on 6 February 1966:

Party		Votes per canton							Total votes	%	Seats
Party		Aguirre	Buenos Aires	Esparza	Golfito	Montes de Oro	Osa	Punta- renas	Total votes	%	Seats
National Unification Party	PUN	2,451	679	1,563	3,988	937	1,705	6,778	18,101	50.46%	4
National Liberation Party	PLN	1,955	1,092	1,417	3,054	853	928	6,553	15,852	44.19%	3
Revolutionary Civic Union	UCR	66	15	71	277	85	72	870	1,456	4.06%	0
Democratic Party	PD	56	22	9	131	8	163	73	462	1.29%	0
Valid votes		4,528	1,808	3,060	7,450	1,883	2,868	14,274	35,871	100.00%	7
Blank votes		143	63	38	194	61	90	300	889	2.23%	
Rejected votes – other		386	111	170	723	155	306	1,257	3,108	7.80%	
Total polled		5,057	1,982	3,268	8,367	2,099	3,264	15,831	39,868	71.94%	
Registered electors		7,234	2,985	3,735	12,549	2,744	5,303	20,871	55,421		
Turnout		69.91%	66.40%	87.50%	66.67%	76.49%	61.55%	75.85%	71.94%		

The following candidates were elected: Erasmo Alfonso Ames Alfau (PUN); Salvador Aráuz Bonilla (PUN); Alberto Delgado Bonilla (PUN); Guillermo Figueroa Chinchilla (PUN); Rafael López Garrido (PLN); Carlos Luis Rodríguez Hernández (PLN); and Carlos Manuel Vicente Castro (PLN).

===== 1962 =====
Results of the 1962 general election held on 4 February 1962:

Party		Votes per canton							Total votes	%	Seats
Party		Aguirre	Buenos Aires	Esparza	Golfito	Montes de Oro	Osa	Punta- renas	Total votes	%	Seats
National Liberation Party	PLN	1,398	612	1,329	1,722	837	864	6,464	13,226	42.92%	3
Republican Party	PR	1,952	112	1,048	2,455	397	1,755	4,641	12,360	40.11%	2
National Union Party	PUN	144	245	314	607	408	309	1,703	3,730	12.10%	1
Popular Democratic Action	PADP	134	6	36	403	33	241	645	1,498	4.86%	0
Valid votes		3,628	975	2,727	5,187	1,675	3,169	13,453	30,814	100.00%	6
Blank votes		130	45	46	179	46	109	195	750	2.33%	
Rejected votes – other		131	26	29	167	26	82	179	640	1.99%	
Total polled		3,889	1,046	2,802	5,533	1,747	3,360	13,827	32,204	66.47%	
Registered electors		6,400	1,772	3,396	9,174	2,400	5,870	19,435	48,447		
Turnout		60.77%	59.03%	82.51%	60.31%	72.79%	57.24%	71.14%	66.47%		

The following candidates were elected: Rodrigo Aráuz Bonilla (PR); Hernán Chaverri Ulloa (PLN); Giro Guerra Baldares (PUN); Malaquías Jiménez Solano (PLN); Rafael París Steffens (PLN); and Octavio Ramírez Garita (PR).

==== 1950s ====
===== 1958 =====
Results of the 1958 general election held on 2 February 1958:

Party		Votes per canton							Total votes	%	Seats
Party		Aguirre	Buenos Aires	Esparza	Golfito	Montes de Oro	Osa	Punta- renas	Total votes	%	Seats
National Liberation Party	PLN	789	243	684	753	572	609	2,744	6,394	39.21%	2
National Republican Party	PRN	709	22	520	831	101	659	1,544	4,386	26.90%	2
National Union Party	PUN	326	104	251	613	295	711	1,758	4,058	24.89%	1
Independent Party	PI	142	94	63	97	59	45	556	1,056	6.48%	0
Revolutionary Civic Union	UCR	15	11	9	20	3	24	110	192	1.18%	0
Democratic Opposition Movement	MDO	20	1	6	22	2	18	43	112	0.69%	0
Democratic Party	PD	21	2	17	10	4	17	37	108	0.66%	0
Valid votes		2,022	477	1,550	2,346	1,036	2,083	6,792	16,306	100.00%	5
Blank votes		73	14	55	92	40	82	155	511	2.77%	
Rejected votes – other		273	11	146	279	81	297	522	1,609	8.73%	
Total polled		2,368	502	1,751	2,717	1,157	2,462	7,469	18,426	50.09%	
Registered electors		5,570	1,269	2,679	5,969	1,914	5,341	14,044	36,786		
Turnout		42.51%	39.56%	65.36%	45.52%	60.45%	46.10%	53.18%	50.09%		

The following candidates were elected: Marcial Aguiluz Orellana (PLN); Carlos Manuel Brenes Méndez (PRN); Francisco Calderón Guardia (PRN); Rafael López Garrido (PLN); and Gonzalo Segares García (PUN).

===== 1953 =====
Results of the 1953 general election held on 26 July 1953:

Party		Votes per canton							Total votes	%	Seats
Party		Aguirre	Buenos Aires	Esparza	Golfito	Montes de Oro	Osa	Punta- renas	Total votes	%	Seats
National Liberation Party	PLN	1,281	327	781	770	426	703	3,522	7,810	59.14%	3
Democratic Party	PD	1,077	56	502	495	143	553	1,924	4,750	35.97%	2
National Union Party	PUN	49	7	41	137	166	70	177	647	4.90%	0
Valid votes		2,407	390	1,324	1,402	735	1,326	5,623	13,207	100.00%	5
Blank votes		89	19	47	99	53	97	240	644	4.28%	
Rejected votes – other		262	20	126	121	64	120	470	1,183	7.87%	
Total polled		2,758	429	1,497	1,622	852	1,543	6,333	15,034	49.80%	
Registered electors		5,474	1,033	2,410	3,784	1,632	3,913	11,944	30,190		
Turnout		50.38%	41.53%	62.12%	42.86%	52.21%	39.43%	53.02%	49.80%		

The following candidates were elected: Manuel Campos Jiménez (PD); Malaquías Jiménez Solano (PD); Rafael Ortiz Róger (PLN); Rafael París Steffens (PLN); and Carlos Manuel Vicente Castro (PLN).

==== 1940s ====
===== 1949 =====
The following candidates were elected at the 1949 general election held on 4 October 1949: Raúl Jiménez Guido (PUN); Julio Obando Segura (PUN); and Amado Recio Pérez (PUN).
