= Rafael París Steffens =

Costa Rican engineer and politician (1920–2010)

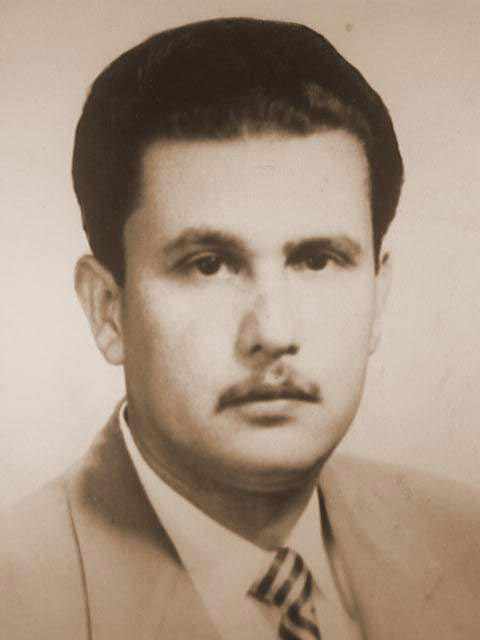
- París c. 1963

Ambassador of Costa Rica to Venezuela
- In office 8 May 1982 – 8 May 1986
- President: Luis Alberto Monge
- Preceded by: Virginia Castro Odio
- Succeeded by: Oscar Hernández Pacheco
Other positions
9th & 11th President of the Legislative Assembly of Costa Rica
In office 1 May 1965 – 30 April 1966
| Preceded by | Rodolfo Solano Orfila |
| Succeeded by | Rodrigo Carazo Odio |
In office 1 May 1963 – 30 April 1964
| Preceded by | Carlos Espinach Escalante |
| Succeeded by | Rodolfo Solano Orfila |
Deputy of the Legislative Assembly of Costa Rica
In office 1 May 1970 – 30 April 1974
| Preceded by | Salvador Aráuz Bonilla |
| Succeeded by | Carlos Luis Rodríguez Hernández |
| Constituency | Puntarenas (1st Office) |
In office 1 May 1962 – 30 April 1966
| Preceded by | Office established |
| Succeeded by | Luis Bonilla Castro |
| Constituency | Puntarenas (1st Office) |
In office 1 November 1953 – 30 April 1958
| Preceded by | Office established |
| Succeeded by | Luis Bonilla Castro |
| Constituency | Puntarenas (1st Office) |

Personal details
- Born: Rafael Antonio José París Steffens; 19 March 1920 Puntarenas, Costa Rica
- Died: 23 August 2010 (aged 90) San José, Costa Rica
- Party: PLN
- Spouse: Virginia Chaverri Ulloa (m. 1942)
- Children: 2
- Education: University of Illinois Urbana-Champaign (BE)
- Occupation: Engineer; politician

Rafael Antonio José París Steffens (19 March 1920 – 23 August 2010) was a Costa Rican engineer, diplomat, and politician. A member of the National Liberation Party, he served as President of the Legislative Assembly of Costa Rica from 1963 to 1964 and again from 1965 to 1966. He was elected to the Legislative Assembly on three occasions, served as Governor of Puntarenas from 1948 to 1949, and was the Ambassador to Venezuela from 1982 to 1986.

París was born in Puntarenas on 19 March 1920, the son of Luis París Franceschi and Mary Steffens Mendoza. He began his higher education at the National University of Colombia, where he studied mathematics and engineering, before continuing his engineering studies at the University of Illinois Urbana-Champaign. He also attended the Faculty of Fine Arts at the University of Costa Rica.

In 1958, the National Liberation Party nominated París as its candidate for Second Vice President on the presidential ticket headed by Francisco Orlich Bolmarcich. The ticket was defeated in the general election by Mario Echandi Jiménez of the National Union Party. He was subsequently elected again to a congressional seat in 1962 and 1970.

In April 1986, París was among several individuals honored by the Municipal Council of Puntarenas with a commemorative plaque recognizing their contributions to the city.

París died in San José on 23 August 2010 at the age of 90.
