= Arnoldo Ferreto =

Costa Rican politician

Arnoldo Ferreto Segura was a Costa Rican politician and a leader of the Popular Vanguard Party.

He was born on July 25, 1910, in Heredia Centro. He grew up in Heredia Centro, where he graduated from the Escuela Normal de Costa Rica and went on to work as a teacher.

Ferreto Segura joined the Communist Party of Costa Rica. He was jailed in 1934 following a banana plantation workers' strike. For sixteen years, Ferreto Segura was member of the Heredia municipal council. Again, he was jailed after the 1948 civil war.

Ferreto Seguro was elected from Puntarenas Province in the 1974 Costa Rican general election. He was re-elected to parliament in the 1982 Costa Rican general election.

In November 1983, the PVP held its third party congress. Along with Humberto Vargas Carbonell, Ferreto Segura led a purge of the followers of Manuel Mora Valverde. Ferreto Segura and Vargas Carbonell represented a more hard-line position than the older leadership. After the congress Mora Valverde refused the post as (honorary) chairman, and Ferreto Segura was named party chairman instead.

He died on March 8, 1996, in San José.
