= Socialist Action Party (Costa Rica) =

Political party in Costa Rica

Socialist Action Party Partido Acción Socialista
- Abbreviation: PASO
- Founder: Marcial Aguiluz Orellana
- Founded: 1968
- Dissolved: 1995
- Succeeded by: United People
- Political position: Left-wing

Party flag

The Socialist Action Party (Partido Acción Socialista) was a left-wing political party in Costa Rica. It was represented in the Legislative Assembly of Costa Rica from 1971 to 1979.

== History ==
Following the 1948 civil war, the Figueres dictatorship banned the communist People's Vanguard Party (PVP) on 17 July 1948, despite previously having given assurances that republican democracy would be respected. Leftists were murdered, imprisoned, exiled and lost their jobs. The Figuerista-controlled Constituent Assembly of Costa Rica modified the constitution in November 1949 to effectively ban left-wing political parties — Article 98 gave the new Legislative Assembly the power to ban political parties opposed to the "democratic organization of Costa Rica" or that threatened the sovereignty of the country. On 28 July 1950 the Figuerista-controlled Legislative Assembly passed Ley N° 1191 outlawing the PVP and any other communist organisation irrespective of the name they adopt.

In 1953 communists managed to register the Independent Progressive Party (Partido Progresista Independiente) but on 24 July 1953, two days prior to the 1953 general election, the Legislative Assembly passed Ley N° 1608 outlawing the party. At the 1958 general election the communists registered the Socialist Party (Partido Socialista) and nominated author Fabián Dobles as their presidential candidate but his nomination was annulled by the government. The communists supported Popular Democratic Action candidate Enrique Obregón Valverde at the 1962 general election. The communists then created the Popular Socialist Action (Acción Popular Socialista) and the Workers, Peasants, and Intellectuals Bloc (Bloque de Obreros, Campesinos e Intelectuales) in 1966 and 1969 respectively but these too were banned. Communist leader Manuel Mora's candidature in the 1970 general election was also blocked.

The Socialist Action Party (Partido Acción Socialista, PASO) was founded in 1968 by Marcial Aguiluz Orellana, a dissident left-wing member of the Figuerista National Liberation Party. Faced with the prospect of banning two parties from an election and undermining Costa Rica's claim to be a democracy, the government allowed PASO to take part in the 1970 general election. PASO formed an alliance with the communists and secured two seats in the Legislative Assembly — Aguiluz and Mora in the San José constituency. PASO's presidential candidate Lisímaco Leiva Cubillo came in fourth after securing 1.34% of votes.

Aguiluz and Mora introduced a bill in the Legislative Assembly to amend the article in the constitution which allowed the government to ban political parties. The bill was discussed but was never put to a vote. At the 1974 general election PASO won two seats again — Lalo Mora in San José constituency and Arnoldo Ferreto in Puntarenas constituency. PASO's presidential candidate Manuel Mora came in sixth, winning 2.37% of votes.

By the early 1970s, attitudes towards communism was thawing amongst the mainstream Costa Rican parties. The clause in the constitution which allowed the Legislative Assembly to ban political parties was removed by Ley N° 5698 passed on 4 June 1975. In 1978 the legalised PVP joined forces with the Costa Rican Socialist Party (PSC) and Revolutionary Movement of the People (MRP, also known as the Workers' Party (Partido de los Trabajadores)) to form the left-wing United People (Pueblo Unido) electoral alliance. PASO remained inactive thereafter and was formally de-registered as a political party by the Supreme Electoral Court of Costa Rica in 1995.

== Electoral performance ==
=== Presidential ===
Election	Candidate	Votes	%	Position
1970	Lisímaco Leiva Cubillo	7,221	1.34%	4th
1974	Manuel Mora	16,081	2.37%	▼6th

=== Legislative Assembly ===
Election	Votes	%	Seats	+/–	Position	Status
1970	29,133	5.49%	2 / 57	New	3rd	Opposition
1974	29,310	4.41%	2 / 57	Steady	▼6th	Opposition
