= Guillermo Vargas Sanabria =

Costa Rican agronomist and politician (born 1938)

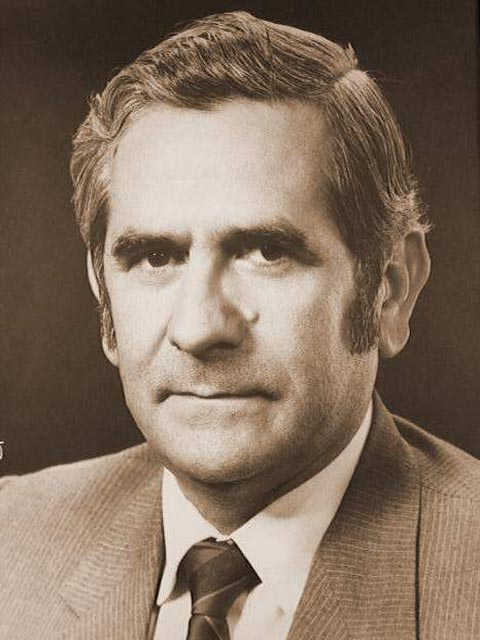
- Vargas in 1985

27th President of the Legislative Assembly of Costa Rica
- In office 1 May 1985 – 30 April 1986
- Preceded by: Bernal Jiménez Monge
- Succeeded by: Rose Marie Karpinsky Dodero

Deputy of the Legislative Assembly of Costa Rica
- In office 1 May 1982 – 30 April 1986
- Preceded by: Ana Ortega Ortega
- Succeeded by: Óscar Julio Ávila Solé
- Constituency: Guanacaste (4th Office)
- In office 1 May 1974 – 30 April 1978
- Preceded by: Asdrúbal Ocampo Ocampo
- Succeeded by: Omar Arrieta Fonseca
- Constituency: Guanacaste (2nd Office)

Personal details
- Born: Guillermo Vargas Sanabria; 6 May 1938 (age 88) San Juan de Naranjo, Costa Rica
- Party: PLN
- Education: Zamorano (BE)

Guillermo Vargas Sanabria (born 6 May 1938) is a Costa Rican agronomist and retired politician who served as the 27th President of the Legislative Assembly from 1985 to 1986. A member of the National Liberation Party, he served as a deputy from 1974 to 1978 and again from 1982 to 1986.

== Biography ==
He was born in San Juan de Naranjo on 6 May 1938, the son of Eugenio Vargas Ugalde and María Sanabria Cruz. He completed his secondary education at the Don Bosco School and later studied at the Escuela Agrícola Panamericana, now known as Zamorano University, in Honduras, where he graduated as an agronomist. He also studied at the University of Costa Rica.

Vargas worked in the agricultural sector, including with a banana company in Golfito and the Linda Vista Agricultural Company in Dulce Nombre de Cartago. He subsequently worked as an agricultural expert for the Banco de Costa Rica.

Vargas also participated in community organizations in Nicoya, Guanacaste, including the local community development association, a board of education, and administrative boards.

In 1974, Vargas was elected to the Legislative Assembly for the 1974–1978 legislative term as a representative of the National Liberation Party for Guanacaste. He was subsequently elected again for the 1982–1986 term. He served as president of the Legislative Assembly from 1985 to 1986.
