= Trabajo =

- Type: Monthly (1931–1932), weekly (1933–1947)
- Publisher: Communist Party of Costa Rica
- Editor: Aureliano Gómez
- Founded: July 14, 1931
- Ceased publication: 1947
- Language: Spanish
- Headquarters: San José
- Circulation: 7,500 (1946)
- Sister newspapers: Revolución, Combate

Trabajo ('Work') was a weekly newspaper published from San José, Costa Rica, from 1931 to 1947. It was the organ of the Communist Party of Costa Rica. Trabajo provided ample coverage of trade union activism. Moreover, the newspaper frequently reproduced proletarian poetry.

== Initial period ==
The first issue of Trabajo was published on July 14, 1931. Unlike its predecessor, Revolución (the organ of ARCO), Trabajo was an explicitly communist publication. During its initial phase Trabajo was sold at ten centavos, but was not distributed through newsstands. Trabajo relied on distribution within the labour movement. It had a circulation of about 1,000. Publishing was somewhat irregular in its first years; it was published on monthly basis until October 1932, and from January 7, 1933, it became a weekly.

== Weekly ==
At the time that Trabajo became a weekly, the distribution became more widespread. According to a report from the U.S. embassy, the street-based distribution network in San José was managed by Carmen Lyra. The newspaper did, however, not have a developed subscription system in the capital or surrounding rural areas. By 1934 it reached a circulation of 4,000.

Trabajo was distributed in neighbouring countries, where the communist movements were suppressed and unable to issue legal organs of their own. The newspaper claimed to have subscribers and readers in Nicaragua, Panama, Colombia, Honduras, Cuba, Venezuela, Mexico, El Salvador and Argentina.

== Betancourt ==
Rómulo Betancourt, a Venezuelan student, was a prominent contributor to Trabajo. When he went into semi-clandestinity in 1933, he was put in charge to manage Trabajo and authored most of its editorials. By 1934 Betancourt was appointed director of the newspaper, as part of his duties as a Central Committee member of the party. Betancourt would become the president of Venezuela in 1945. As of 1935 the editor of Trabajo was Aureliano Gómez.

== Popular Front line ==
In the aftermath of the 1936 election, in which the communists lost their parliamentary representation and the pro-fascist León Cortés Castro emerged victorious, the political discourse of Trabajo shifted. The rhetoric of denouncing 'bourgeois democracy' and the 'landlord-bourgeois government' was discontinued. Rather the newspaper adhered to the popular front line, supporting defense of democratic advances. Trabajo carried poetry dealing with the Spanish Civil War.

On June 14, 1941, a special issue of Trabajo was issued in 10,000 copies, celebrating the tenth anniversary of the foundation of the Communist Party.

== Later period ==
By 1946, Trabajo had a circulation of 7,500, which made it one of the most widely read newspapers in the country. Publication of Trabajo had ended by the time of the outbreak of 1948 Civil War. Whilst the Costa Rican communist were unable to maintain publication of Trabajo, the communist-controlled trade union organ Combate (1943–1953) continued to appear. Later the Popular Vanguard Party founded Adelante as a successor to Trabajo.
