= People's Vanguard Party (Costa Rica) =

People's Vanguard Party Partido Vanguardia Popular
- General Secretary: Trino Barrantes Araya
- Founded: 16 June 1931 (as the Workers and Farmers Party) 2 February 1977 (prohibition lifted)
- Banned: 7 July 1948 17 March 2010
- Ideology: Communism; Marxism–Leninism
- Political position: Far-left
- Regional affiliation: São Paulo Forum
- International affiliation: IMCWP

Party flag

Website
- Periódico Libertad

The People's Vanguard Party, or Popular Vanguard Party (Spanish: Partido Vanguardia Popular) was a Marxist-Leninist party in Costa Rica. PVP was founded in 1931 as the Workers and Farmers Party, but was soon renamed to the Communist Party of Costa Rica (Partido Comunista de Costa Rica).

From 1931 to 1947, the party published Trabajo as a communist newspaper. The PVP's current publication is El Popular.

== History ==
In 1943, the party was renamed as PVP, in order to facilitate its alliance with the Catholic Church and the government, whose reformist policies the party supported.

In 1949, the party was banned. Its militants began working under the name 'Partido Acción Socialista Obrera'.

In the mid-1960s the U.S. State Department estimated the party membership to be approximately 300.

In 1970, the party again could contest elections.

In 1984, a severe internal crisis appeared in the party. At the 14th party congress, two of the party MPs, Arnoldo Ferreto Segura and Humberto Vargas Carbonell took over the party leadership and deposed Mora (who had led the party since 1934). Mora's followers continued to use the name PVP, thus there were two parties with the same name. In 1984 Mora's party took the name Costa Rican People's Party.

On April 29, 2012, VP held a constitutive assembly for the electoral registration that would allow them to participate as a national party in the 2014 elections, which finally did not happen. At the meeting, María Isabel Fallas was elected president of the provisional executive committee. Subsequently, Trino Barrantes Araya would assume that position. In the XVI International Meeting of Communist and Workers' Parties, held in Guayaquil, Ecuador, from November 13 to 15, 2014, the Partido Vanguardia Popular was represented by Luis Salas Sarkis and Sonia Zamora.

The party was unable to finish the process of re-inscription that all parties need to do four-yearly and was declared cancelled by the Supreme Electoral Court of Costa Rica, different attempts to re-found it had been unsuccessful.

== Electoral performance ==
=== Presidential ===
Election	Leader	First round				Coalition
Election	Leader	Votes	%	Position	Result	Coalition
1936	Manuel Mora Valverde	4,594	5.3%	3/3	Lost	-
1940	Manuel Mora Valverde	10,825	9.8%	▲2/3	Lost	-
1944	Teodoro Picado Michalski	52,830	75.1%	▲1/2	Won	Victory Bloc
1948	Rafael Ángel Calderón Guardia	44,438	44.7%	▼2/2	Lost	Victory Bloc
1953	Banned					
1958	Banned					
1958	Banned					
1962	Banned					
1966	Banned					
1970	Banned					
1974	Banned					
1978	Rodrigo Gutiérrez Sáenz	22,740	2.7%	3/8	Lost	United People
1982	Rodrigo Gutiérrez Sáenz	32,186	3.3%	▼4/6	Lost	United People
1986	Rodrigo Gutiérrez Sáenz	9,099	0.8%	▲3/6	Lost	Peoples' Alliance
1990	Víctor Daniel Camacho Monge	9,217	0.7%	3/7	Lost	United People
1994	Did not participate					
1998	Norma Vargas Duarte	3,075	0.2%	▼10/12	Lost	United People
2002	Walter Coto Molina	3,970	0.2%	▲8/13	Lost	Change 2000
2006	Humberto Vargas Carbonell	2,291	0.1%	▼13/14	Lost	United Left
2010	Did not participate					
2014	Did not participate					
2018	Did not participate					
2022	Martín Chinchilla Castro	1,495	0.07%	▼24/25	Lost	United People
2026	Did not participate					

== See also ==
- Category:People's Vanguard Party (Costa Rica) politicians
- Manuel Mora
- Joaquín Gutiérrez
