= National Unification Party (Costa Rica) =

Former political party in Costa Rica

National Unification Party Unificación Nacional
- Founded: 1966
- Dissolved: c. 1978
- Preceded by: National Republican Party; National Union Party
- Merged into: Unity Coalition
- Ideology: Calderonism; Anti-Figuerism; Factions: Christian democracy Economic liberalism Social conservativism Anti-communism
- Political position: Center-right to right wing
- Colours: Blue; Yellow

Party flag

Flag of the National Unification Coalition, used for the 1966 election.

The National Unification Party (Spanish: Partido Unificación Nacional, PUN) was a political party in Costa Rica from 1965 to 1978. It was formed as a broad anti-PLN coalition, bringing together supporters of former presidents Rafael Ángel Calderón Guardia and Otilio Ulate Blanco, as well as several smaller political groups. Ideologically, the party combined elements of liberalism, Christian democracy, anti-communism, social welfare policies, and support for a market economy.

The party won the presidency in the 1966 general election with José Joaquín Trejos Fernández and remained the principal opposition force to the National Liberation Party throughout the 1970s. Following the deaths of its principal leaders and internal fragmentation, the party declined and ultimately disappeared, with many of its members (including Trejos) later joining the Social Christian Unity Party.

== History ==
The National Unification Party was established as a coalition in 1965 in response to the political dominance of the National Liberation Party in the decades following the Costa Rican Civil War. It became a party following the merger of the National Republican Party, led by former president Rafael Ángel Calderón Guardia, and the National Union Party, headed by former president Otilio Ulate Blanco, together with several smaller political organizations.

Although conceived as a coalition of diverse anti-liberationista forces, Calderón Guardia quickly became the party's dominant figure. Due to his influence, the party was frequently associated with the Calderonista political tradition and was often regarded as highly personalist in character.

In the 1966 general election, the party won the presidency with the candidacy of professor José Joaquín Trejos Fernández. It also secured 26 seats in the Legislative Assembly, falling 3 seats short of an absolute majority. For the 1970 election, the party nominated former president Mario Echandi Jiménez. Echandi was defeated by former president José Figueres Ferrer, who returned to office for a second full term. Despite losing the presidency, the party retained a strong parliamentary presence, winning 22 legislative seats.

The death of Calderón Guardia in June 1970 deprived the party of its principal leader. Leadership subsequently passed to his brother, Francisco Calderón Guardia, but the party's cohesion gradually weakened. In the 1974 election, the party nominated liberal physician Fernando Trejos Escalante for the presidency. He was defeated by Daniel Oduber Quirós of the PLN, while the National Unification Party's representation in the Legislative Assembly fell to 16 seats. Francisco Calderón Guardia's death in July 1977 accelerated the party's decline. Many of the groups that had originally formed the coalition, including former Republicans and members of the National Union Party, began to leave the organization.

The party contested the 1978 election with deputy Guillermo Villalobos Arce as its presidential candidate. Villalobos was unsuccessful, and the party failed to win any seats in the Legislative Assembly. By that time, much of its political base had already shifted to the Unity Coalition, which later evolved into the Social Christian Unity Party in 1983.

== Electoral performance ==
=== Presidential ===
| Election | Candidate | First round | | | |
| Election | Candidate | Votes | % | Position | Result |
|---|---|---|---|---|---|
| 1966 | José Joaquín Trejos Fernández | 222,810 | 50.48% | 1st | Won |
| 1970 | Mario Echandi Jiménez | 222,372 | 41.18% | ▼2nd | Lost |
| 1974 | Fernando Trejos Escalante | 206,149 | 30.40% | 1st | Lost |
| 1978 | Guillermo Villalobos Arce | 13,666 | 1.64% | 1st | Lost |

=== Parliamentary ===
| Election | Leader | Votes | % | Seats | +/– | Position | Government |
|---|---|---|---|---|---|---|---|
| 1966 | José Joaquín Trejos Fernández | 178,953 | 43.16% | 26 / 57 | New | 2nd | Government |
| 1970 | Mario Echandi Jiménez | 190,387 | 35.89% | 22 / 57 | ▼4 | 2nd | Opposition |
| 1974 | Fernando Trejos Escalante | 164,323 | 24.71% | 16 / 57 | ▼6 | 2nd | Opposition |
| 1978 | Guillermo Villalobos Arce | 25,824 | 3.15% | 0 / 57 | ▼16 | ▼4th | Extra-parliamentary |
