= 1974 Costa Rican general election =

- 3 February 1974
- Presidential election
- Registered: 875,041
- Turnout: 79.92% (▼3.42pp)
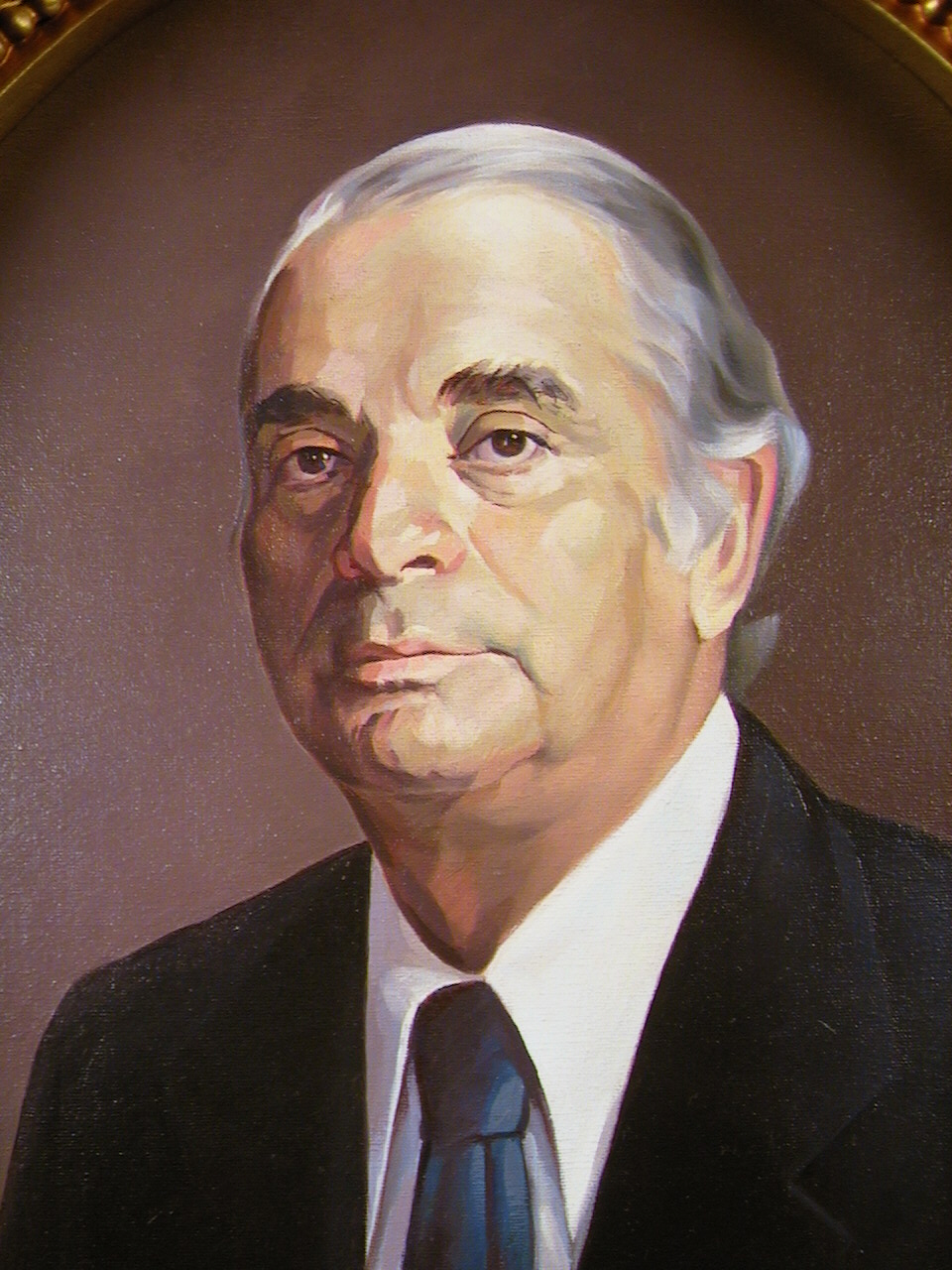

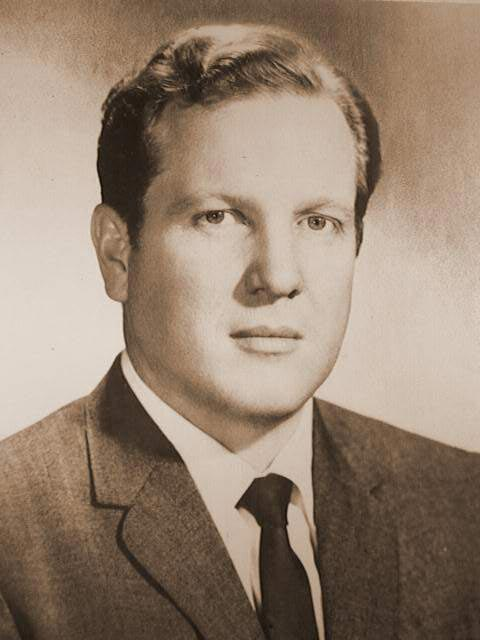
Nominee	Daniel Oduber	Fernando Trejos Escalante
Party	PLN	UN
Running mate	Carlos Castillo; Fernando Guzmán	Jorge Borbón; Longino Soto
Popular vote	294,609
Percentage	43.44%	30.40%
Nominee	Jorge González Martén	Rodrigo Carazo
Party	PNI	PRD
Running mate	Claudio Orlich; José Malavassi	José Rodríguez; Franz Lara
Popular vote	73,788	61,820
Percentage	10.88%	9.12%
- Results by district Oduber: 30–40% 40–50% 50–60% 60–70% 70-80% 80-90% Trejos: 30–40% 40–50% 50–60% 60–70% 70-80% González: 40–50%
President before election
José Figueres
PLN
Elected President
Daniel Oduber
PLN
- Legislative election
- All 57 seats in the Legislative Assembly; 29 seats needed for a majority
- Turnout: 79.89% (▼3.43pp)
Party	Leader	Vote %	Seats	+/–
PLN	Daniel Oduber Quirós	40.88	27	−5
UN	Fernando Trejos Escalante	24.71	16	−6
PNI	Jorge González Martén	9.96	6	New
PRD	Rodrigo Carazo Odio	7.68	3	New
PRN	Rafael Ángel Calderón Fournier	4.88	1	New
PASO	Manuel Mora Valverde	4.41	2	0
Democratic	Gerardo Villalobos Garita	2.13	1	New
PUAC	Juan Guillermo Brenes Castillo	1.21	1	+1
This lists parties that won seats. See the complete results below.
Results by province

General elections were held in Costa Rica on 3 February 1974. Daniel Oduber Quirós of the National Liberation Party won the presidential election, whilst his party also won the parliamentary election. Voter turnout was 80%.

The Left was theoretically outlawed as the Constitution didn't allow the existence of Marxist parties, but the prohibition was not endorsed in practice by that time and even was lifted with a Constitutional reform for the next election.

== Campaign ==
The government’s popularity suffered due to the “Vesco Case,” a major corruption scandal involving President José Figueres and his alleged ties to international fugitive Robert Vesco. The controversy became a central issue in the campaign, with the presence of Vesco in the country used by all opposition candidates against the ruling National Liberation Party (PLN) nominee, congressman Daniel Oduber.

Rodrigo Carazo, a former PLN member and congressman who had previously competed against Figueres in a primary, ran under the Democratic Renewal Party. He pledged to expel Vesco if elected and received the endorsement of former president José Joaquín Trejos. Vesco's presence in the country was a theme used by all the candidates against the PLN.

The right-wing opposition, grouped under the National Unification Party, also selected its candidate through an internal convention. Guillermo Villalobos Arce had the backing of the party leadership, including president Francisco Calderón Guardia (brother of former president Rafael Ángel Calderón Guardia). Fernando Ortuño Sobrado enjoyed strong business sector support and significant funding, while Fernando Trejos Escalante, a physician and cousin of former president Trejos, was considered the weakest contender. In a surprise result, Trejos Escalante won the nomination, but was later defeated by Oduber in the general election.

Cold War tensions also shaped the campaign, with communism emerging as another major theme. Diplomatic relations with the Soviet Union became a contentious issue, as candidate Jorge González Martén promised to end them if elected. The Catholic Church issued a statement condemning both communism and unrestrained capitalism, calling instead for a “third option.” Both the PLN, a social democratic party, and the Christian Democratic Party claimed to represent that alternative. Manuel Mora’s Socialist Action Party, representing the traditional left, countered criticism by noting that former archbishop Víctor Manuel Sanabria had stated Costa Rican Catholics could join the Communist Party. Meanwhile, the far-right Free Costa Rica Movement ran an expensive media campaign against Mora’s party.

Another notable figure in the race was Gerardo Wenceslao Villalobos, known as “GW,” the candidate of the Democratic Party. Villalobos gained attention for his unconventional campaign tactics, which included participating in boxing and wrestling matches and attempting a parachute jump.

== Results ==
=== President ===
Candidate	Party	Votes	%
Daniel Oduber Quirós	National Liberation Party	294,609	43.44
Fernando Trejos Escalante	National Unification Party	206,149	30.40
Jorge González Martén	National Independent Party	73,788	10.88
Rodrigo Carazo Odio	Democratic Renewal Party	61,820	9.12
Gerardo Villalobos Garita	Democratic Party	18,832	2.78
Manuel Mora Valverde	Socialist Action Party	16,081	2.37
Jorge Arturo Monge Zamora	Christian Democratic Party	3,461	0.51
José Francisco Aguilar Bulgarelli	Costa Rican Socialist Party	3,417	0.50
Total		678,157	100.00
Valid votes		678,157	96.97
Invalid votes		16,160	2.31
Blank votes		5,023	0.72
Total votes		699,340	100.00
Registered voters/turnout		875,041	79.92
Source: Election Resources

==== By province ====
Province	Oduber %	Trejos %	González %	Carazo %	Villalobos %	Mora %	Monge %	Aguilar %
San José	42.7	29.4	9.0	12.2	3.8	2.0	0.5	0.5
Alajuela	45.6	28.4	12.5	9.8	1.7	1.1	0.4	0.5
Cartago	43.6	29.4	15.9	5.9	2.7	1.5	0.6	0.5
Heredia	42.9	29.9	11.0	9.5	3.0	2.5	0.7	0.4
Puntarenas	39.5	36.3	11.0	4.5	2.2	5.5	0.5	0.5
Limón	38.8	39.4	7.7	3.4	2.4	7.1	0.5	0.6
Guanacaste	49.6	30.0	11.5	4.9	0.8	2.0	0.8	0.5
Total	43.4	30.4	10.9	9.1	2.8	2.4	0.5	0.5

=== Parliament ===
Party	Votes	%	Seats	+/–
National Liberation Party	271,867	40.88	27	–5
National Unification Party	164,323	24.71	16	–6
National Independent Party	66,222	9.96	6	New
Democratic Renewal Party	51,082	7.68	3	New
National Republican Party	32,475	4.88	1	New
Socialist Action Party	29,310	4.41	2	0
Democratic Party	14,161	2.13	1	New
Christian Democratic Party	13,688	2.06	0	–1
Cartago Agrarian Union Party	8,074	1.21	1	+1
Costa Rican Socialist Party	6,032	0.91	0	New
Costa Rican Peoples' Front	4,448	0.67	0	New
Independent Party	3,282	0.49	0	New
Total	664,964	100.00	57	0
Valid votes	664,964	95.13		
Invalid votes	21,111	3.02		
Blank votes	12,967	1.85		
Total votes	699,042	100.00		
Registered voters/turnout	875,041	79.89		
Source: Election Resources

==== By province ====
Province	PLN		PUN		PNI		PRD		PRN		PASO		PD		PDC		PUAC		PSC		FPCR		PI	
Province	%	S	%	S	%	S	%	S	%	S	%	S	%	S	%	S	%	S	%	S	%	S	%	S
San José	40.1	9	23.4	5	8.7	2	10.1	2	5.6	1	4.3	1	2.8	1	1.7	0	-	-	1.4	0	1.4	0	0.6	0
Alajuela	44.3	5	25.1	3	11.9	2	9.2	1	2.7	0	1.9	0	3.0	0	0.8	0	-	-	0.8	0	-	-	0.3	0
Cartago	38.1	3	23.6	2	11.9	1	3.9	0	2.7	0	2.3	0	1.3	0	3.8	0	11.1	1	0.6	0	-	-	0.7	0
Heredia	41.1	2	22.7	1	9.8	0	7.4	0	7.4	0	5.7	0	1.5	0	3.5	0	-	-	0.7	0	-	-	0.3	0
Puntarenas	38.3	3	29.8	2	10.6	1	4.0	0	5.7	0	7.3	1	1.1	0	1.4	0	-	-	0.5	0	0.8	0	0.6	0
Limón	36.9	2	32.6	1	7.1	0	2.3	0	5.0	0	13.9	0	0.9	0	0.8	0	-	-	-	-	-	-	0.5	0
Guanacaste	46.0	3	23.9	2	10.4	1	5.1	0	5.8	0	3.2	0	0.4	0	4.4	0	-	-	0.3	0	-	-	0.3	0
Total	40.9	27	24.7	16	10.0	6	7.7	3	4.9	1	4.4	2	2.1	1	2.1	0	1.2	1	0.9	0	0.7	0	0.5	0

=== Local governments ===
Party	Votes	%	Seats			
Party	Votes	%	Alderpeople	+/–	Municipal syndics	+/–
National Liberation Party	281,067	42.44	225	+38	350	+34
National Unification Party	174,178	26.30	150	+17	37	–9
National Independent Party	67,802	10.24	48	New	2	New
Democratic Renewal Party	57,036	8.61	24	New	0	New
National Republican Party	30,551	4.61	12	New	1	New
Socialist Action Party	27,614	4.17	8	+4	0	0
Christian Democratic Party	14,215	2.15	0	–2	0	0
Costa Rican Socialist Party	4,720	0.71	0	New	0	New
Democratic Party	2,456	0.37	0	New	0	New
Costa Rican Peoples' Front	1,588	0.24	0	New	0	New
Independent Party	1,035	0.16	0	New	0	New
Total	662,262	100.00	467	+138	390	+27
Valid votes	662,262	94.72				
Invalid/blank votes	36,949	5.28				
Total votes	699,211	100.00				
Registered voters/turnout	875,041	79.91				
Source: TSE
