= Mario Echandi Jiménez =

President of Costa Rica from 1958 to 1962

Mario Echandi Jimenéz OYC OMC
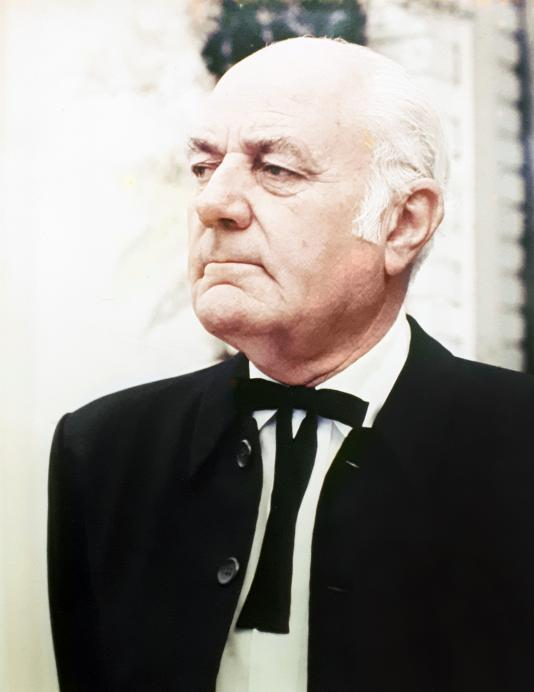
- Echandi, c. 1970

33rd President of Costa Rica
- In office 8 May 1958 – 8 May 1962
- Vice President: Abelardo Bonilla Baldares; José Joaquín Peralta Esquivel
- Preceded by: José Figueres Ferrer
- Succeeded by: Francisco Orlich Bolmarcich

Deputy of the Legislative Assembly of Costa Rica
- In office 1 November 1953 – 1955
- Preceded by: Constituency established
- Succeeded by: Florentino Castro Monge
- Constituency: San José (16th Office)

Minister of Foreign Affairs
- In office 1950–1952
- President: Otilio Ulate Blanco
- Preceded by: Benjamín Odio Odio
- Succeeded by: Fernando Lara Bustamante

Personal details
- Born: Mario José Echandi Jiménez; 17 June 1915 San José, Costa Rica
- Died: 30 July 2011 (aged 96) San José, Costa Rica
- Party: National Movement (1981–1982)
- Other political affiliations: National Unification Party (1965–1978); National Union Party (1948–1965)
- Spouse: Olga de Benedictis Antonelli (m. 1941; died 2001)
- Relatives: Arnoldo López Echandi (nephew)
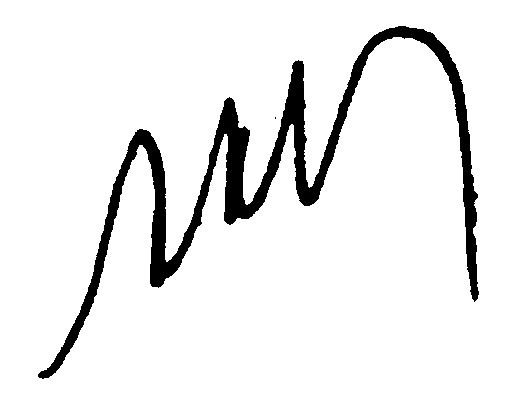
- Signature

Mario José Echandi Jiménez (17 June 1915 – 30 July 2011) was a Costa Rican lawyer and politician who served as the 33rd President of Costa Rica from 1958 to 1962. A conservative liberal, he presided over a process of national reconciliation following the Civil War and modernized the country's drinking water system through the creation of the Costa Rican Institute of Aqueducts and Sewers.

== As diplomat ==
Mario Echandi was a career diplomat. Prior to his election, he had served as Costa Rica's ambassador to the United States and as the country's representative to both the United Nations and the Organization of American States (1949–1950). He also served as the minister of foreign affairs (1950–1952) under President Otilio Ulate and in the Legislative Assembly during President José Figueres's second term in office (1953–1958).

== His presidency ==
President Echandi won the 1958 election by 102.851 votes as candidate of the National Union Party. Francisco J. Orlich was candidate of National Liberation Party with 94.778 and Jorge Rossi had 23.910 votes with the Independent Party. . During his administration some important laws were passed. The "Ley de Aguinaldo" law gave an extra yearly salary to all workers. A law that created the national service for clean water was approved. The law that created a national institute for land reform and colonization. (ITCO law). The first national plan for transit and roads was created, to build a network of highways and roads in the country.

== National reconciliation ==
During his administration some political figures were allowed to return from exile, like the former president Rafael Ángel Calderón Guardia. His followers were allowed to return to the country and organize politically.

== After his presidency ==
He ran for the presidency on two further occasions – 1970 and 1982 – but was defeated on both.

== Death ==
Echandi died on 30 July 2011 at the age of 96 from pneumonia after a heart attack. His wife died in 2001.

Political offices
| Preceded by José Figueres Ferrer | President of Costa Rica; 1958–1962 | Succeeded by Francisco Orlich Bolmarcich |
