= National Republican Party (Costa Rica) =

Defunct political party in Costa Rica

National Republican Party Partido Republicano Nacional
- Leaders: Ricardo Jiménez Oreamuno; León Cortés Castro; Rafael Calderón; Teodoro Picado Michalski
- Founded: 1901
- Dissolved: 1952
- Succeeded by: National Unification Party (Not legal successor)
- Ideology: Until 1940: Liberalism; Under Calderón: Calderonism; Christian democracy Christian socialism Left-wing populism
- Political position: Centre-right (until 1940); Left-wing (from 1940)
- Colors: Blue Yellow Red

Party flag

The National Republican Party (Spanish: Partido Republicano Nacional; PRN) was a political party in Costa Rica.

== History ==
A loosely liberal party was founded under the leadership of Máximo Fernández Alvarado known simply as Republican Party in 1901, its candidate was Fernández himself three times. The party's candidate Ricardo Jiménez Oreamuno was elected president in 1910. A non-elected president member of the party was Alfredo González Flores who became the only president of Costa Rica appointed by the Congress.

After electing Jiménez on three occasions, the party also secured the election of León Cortés Castro in 1936, Rafael Ángel Calderón Guardia in 1940 and Teodoro Picado Michalski in 1944 becoming a dominant party. During Calderón's leadership the party moved toward Christian democracy and Christian socialism making some of the country's first social reforms in alliance with the Communist Party.

In 1940, the National Republican Party won the elections. Criticism over corruption, authoritarianism and voting fraud against the party and the results of the 1948 election in which the republican-dominated Congress overturned the elections because its candidate Calderón apparently lost because of the 1948 Civil War. After that the party was banned for a while and its leaders Calderón and Picado in exile. The party would still remain relevant in the political system once democracy was restored but would only attain power in coalition with liberal forces (the party endorsed the successful candidacies of Mario Echandi and José Joaquín Trejos as part of alliances with other parties), eventually disappearing.

Rafael Ángel Calderón Fournier (Calderón's son) founded a new party named Social Christian Republican Party in 2014 using the traditional party's colors and flag.

== Ideology ==
While the party was initially associated with coffee growing oligarchs and liberal elites and supported policies favorable towards these groups, the party moved towards Catholic socialist principles and alliance with the communists in the 1940s. Under the presidency of Calderón Guardia, the party "eschewed the support of the coffee oligarchy and developed a broad coalition, which included the Catholic Church and the Communist Party", and the party reoriented itself as "an instrument of the working and middle groups".
