= 1970 Costa Rican general election =

- 1 February 1970
- Presidential election
- Registered: 675,285
- Turnout: 83.34% (▲1.94pp)
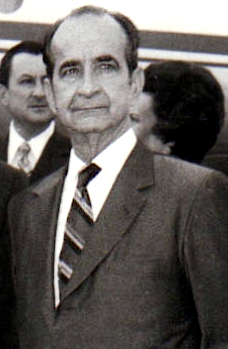

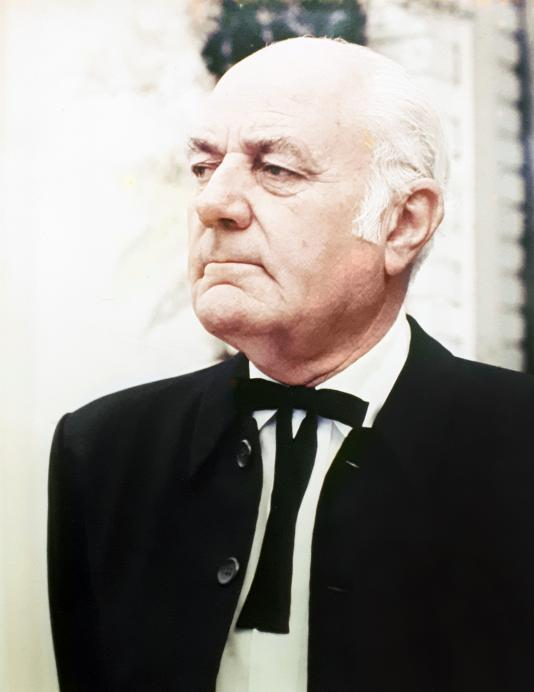
Nominee	José Figueres	Mario Echandi
Party	PLN	UN
Running mate	Manuel Aguilar; Jorge Rossi	Jorge Campabadal; Guillermo Villalobos
Popular vote	295,883	222,372
Percentage	54.79%	41.18%
- Results by district Figueres: 40–50% 50–60% 60–70% 70-80% 80-90% 90-100% Echandi: 40–50% 50–60%
President before election
José Joaquín Trejos Fernández
UN
Elected President
José Figueres Ferrer
PLN
- Legislative election
- All 57 seats in the Legislative Assembly; 29 seats needed for a majority
- Turnout: 83.32% (▲1.92pp)
Party	Leader	Vote %	Seats	+/–
PLN	José Figueres Ferrer	50.72	32	+2
UN	Mario Echandi Jiménez	35.89	22	−4
PASO	Lisímaco Leiva Cubillo	5.49	2	New
PDC	Jorge Arturo Monge Zamora	2.54	1	New
This lists parties that won seats. See the complete results below.
Results by province

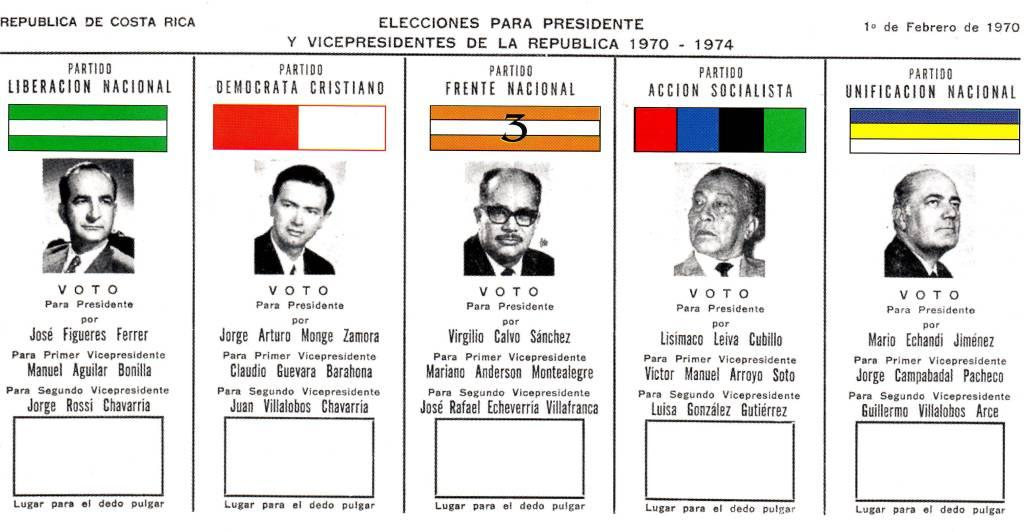
Ballot paper

General elections were held in Costa Rica on 1 February 1970. Former president José Figueres Ferrer of the National Liberation Party won the presidential election, whilst his party also won the parliamentary election. Voter turnout was 83%.

On 25 June 1969, the Legislative Assembly of Costa Rica reformed the Constitution to prohibit presidential reelection, but as any legal reform was retroactive, all previous presidents could be candidates one more time. Two former presidents José Figueres Ferrer and Mario Echandi Jiménez were the two main candidates in the election.

Echandi was nominated by then ruling party National Unification (PUN), a right-wing conservative party made out of the merger of the Republicans (Calderonistas) and the National Union (Ulatistas). However, the union was starting to break and Ulate unsuccessfully presented a separate list of Unification candidates for Congress. In the main opposition force and by then dominant-party PLN, the nominee had been the historical leader and twice president before José Figueres. Figueres was selected after a primary election (or National Convention as they're known in Costa Rica) in which he defeated then Congressman and former Secretary General of the party, Rodrigo Carazo. The convention was particularly harsh and after the results, Figueres did not include any of Carazo supporters in power positions (as was a traditional courtesy), something that future president Carazo resented and which caused him to eventually leave the party.

National Unification's forces, however, weren't in better conditions. Ulate did not endorse Echandi and left the coalition. Others that left were Virgilio Calvo and Mariano Zúñiga from the Calderonist faction that made their own new party, the National Front (aka “Third Front”). Ulate promised them the support of this party, but PUN's General Assembly did not follow his lead and endorsed Echandi's candidacy. The group had minimal impact in the election.

Other minor parties were the Christian Democratic Party, led by physician Jorge Arturo Monge Zamora, and the Socialist Action Party led by former PLN member Marcial Aguiluz Orellana and historical Communist leader Manuel Mora. Communism was still illegal at the time, but the prohibition was flexible on non-explicitly Marxist parties, and several leaders were already questioning the antidemocratic nature of the measure and calling for it to be lifted, including Figueres himself.

Figueres won by a very broad margin over Echandi, 54% over 41%, and his party, the PLN, won a majority in Parliament. Socialists and Christian Democrats also achieved representation.

== Results ==
=== President ===
Candidate	Party	Votes	%
José Figueres Ferrer	National Liberation Party	295,883	54.79
Mario Echandi Jiménez	National Unification Party	222,372	41.18
Virgilio Calvo Sánchez	National Front	9,554	1.77
Lisímaco Leiva Cubillo	Socialist Action Party	7,221	1.34
Jorge Arturo Monge Zamora	Christian Democratic Party	5,015	0.93
Total		540,045	100.00
Valid votes		540,045	95.96
Invalid votes		18,153	3.23
Blank votes		4,568	0.81
Total votes		562,766	100.00
Registered voters/turnout		675,285	83.34
Source: Election Resources

==== By province ====
Province	Figueres %	Echandi %	Calvo %	Leiva %	Monge %
San José	55.1	40.3	1.8	1.6	1.3
Alajuela	54.6	42.2	2.0	0.7	0.6
Cartago	59.6	37.2	1.5	0.9	0.8
Heredia	52.3	42.9	2.0	1.3	1.5
Puntarenas	50.6	44.9	1.8	2.4	0.4
Limón	48.1	47.5	1.7	2.4	0.3
Guanacaste	57.0	40.5	1.4	0.7	0.4
Total	54.8	41.2	1.8	1.3	0.9

=== Legislative Assembly ===
Party	Votes	%	Seats	+/–
National Liberation Party	269,038	50.72	32	+3
National Unification Party	190,387	35.89	22	–4
Socialist Action Party	29,133	5.49	2	New
National Front	16,392	3.09	0	New
Christian Democratic Party	13,489	2.54	1	New
National Union Party	6,105	1.15	0	New
Costa Rican Renewal Movement	3,279	0.62	0	New
Cartago Agrarian Union Party	2,394	0.45	0	New
Puntarenense Renewal Party	208	0.04	0	New
Total	530,425	100.00	57	0
Valid votes	530,425	94.27		
Invalid votes	21,380	3.80		
Blank votes	10,873	1.93		
Total votes	562,678	100.00		
Registered voters/turnout	675,285	83.32		
Source: Election Resources

==== By province ====
Province	PLN		PUN		PASO		FN		PDC		PUN		MRC		PUAC		PRP	
Province	%	S	%	S	%	S	%	S	%	S	%	S	%	S	%	S	%	S
San José	50.3	11	33.8	7	7.9	2	2.5	0	3.5	1	1.4	0	0.7	0	-	-	-	-
Alajuela	52.3	6	38.5	4	2.4	0	3.9	0	1.4	0	1.3	0	0.2	0	-	-	-	-
Cartago	53.8	4	32.0	3	3.0	0	2.4	0	3.4	0	0.7	0	0.7	0	4.0	0	-	-
Heredia	48.2	2	37.2	1	5.4	0	4.3	0	4.0	0	0.4	0	0.4	0	-	-	-	-
Puntarenas	47.1	4	40.1	3	6.2	0	3.2	0	0.7	0	0.8	0	1.1	0	-	-	0.4	0
Limón	44.2	2	41.3	1	9.9	0	3.2	0	0.4	0	0.7	0	0.3	0	-	-	-	-
Guanacaste	54.0	3	37.5	3	1.5	0	4.1	0	0.8	0	1.3	0	0.9	0	-	-	-	-
Total	50.7	32	35.9	22	5.5	2	3.1	0	2.5	1	1.2	0	0.6	0	0.5	0	0.1	0

=== Local governments ===
Party	Votes	%	Seats			
Party	Votes	%	Alderpeople	+/–	Municipal syndics	+/–
National Liberation Party	276,124	52.00	189	+37	316	+114
National Unification Party	198,520	37.38	133	–7	46	–86
Socialist Action Party	20,043	3.77	4	New	0	New
National Front	15,704	2.96	1	New	1	New
Christian Democratic Party	13,249	2.49	2	New	0	New
National Union Party	3,908	0.74	0	New	0	New
Costa Rican Renewal Movement	2,192	0.41	0	New	0	New
Desamparadenean Independent Union Party	1,244	0.23	0	New	0	New
Puntarenense Renewal Party	64	0.01	0	New	0	New
Total	531,048	100.00	329	+36	363	+29
Valid votes	531,048	94.37				
Invalid/blank votes	31,681	5.63				
Total votes	562,729	100.00				
Registered voters/turnout	674,785	83.39				
Source: TSE
