= Manuel Mora =

Manuel Mora may refer to:

- Manuel Mora (politician), communist and labor leader in Costa Rica
- Manuel Mora (soldier), Dominican activist and soldier
- Manuel Mora (musician), American musician
- Manuel Mora Morales, Canarian writer, filmmaker and editor
- Manuel Mora Torres, Andalusian anarchist, trade unionist and militant
