= Cartago (Legislative Assembly constituency) =

Constituency in Costa Rica

- Constituency for the Legislative Assembly of Costa Rica
- Location of Cartago within Costa Rica
- Province: Cartago
- Population: 545,092 (2022)
- Electorate: 409,878 (2022)
- Area: 3,093 km^{2} (2024)

Current Constituency
- Created: 1949
- Seats: List: 7 (2002–present); 6 (1978–2002); 7 (1962–1978); 6 (1953–1962); 7 (1949–1953)
- Deputies: List: Johana Alemán Bonilla (Ind); Óscar Izquierdo Sandí (PLN); Rosaura Méndez Gamboa (PLN); Paola Nájera Abarca (PPSD); Antonio José Ortega Gutiérrez (FA); Alejandro José Pacheco Castro (PUSC); Paulina María Ramírez Portuguez (PLN)

Cartago is one of the seven multi-member constituencies of the Legislative Assembly, the national legislature of Costa Rica. The constituency was established in 1949 when the Legislative Assembly was established by the modified constitution imposed by the Figueres dictatorship. It is conterminous with the province of Cartago. The constituency currently elects seven of the 57 members of the Legislative Assembly using the closed party-list proportional representation electoral system. At the 2022 general election it had 409,878 registered electors.

== Electoral system ==
Cartago currently elects seven of the 57 members of the Legislative Assembly using the closed party-list proportional representation electoral system. Seats are allocated using the largest remainder method using the Hare quota (cociente). Only parties that receive at least 50% of the Hare quota (subcociente) compete for remainder seats. Any seats remaining unfilled after allocation using the quotient system are distributed amongst parties that surpassed the subcociente, is descending order of their total votes in the constituency. The latter process is repeated until all the seats in the constituency are filled.

== Election results ==
=== Summary ===
Election	United People PU / IU / CC2000 / PASO			Broad Front FA			Citizens' Action PAC			Cartago Agrarian Union PUAC			National Republican PRN / PR / PRI / PC			National Liberation PLN / PSD			Social Christian Unity PUSC / CU / PDC			National Unification PUN / PUN			National Integration PIN			Libertarian Movement PML			Social Democratic Progress PPSD			National Restoration PRN		
Election	Votes	%	Seats	Votes	%	Seats	Votes	%	Seats	Votes	%	Seats	Votes	%	Seats	Votes	%	Seats	Votes	%	Seats	Votes	%	Seats	Votes	%	Seats	Votes	%	Seats	Votes	%	Seats	Votes	%	Seats
2022	704	0.26%	0	25,442	9.52%	1	8,078	3.02%	0							71,862	26.89%	3	32,161	12.04%	1				3,375	1.26%	0	2,650	0.99%	0	29,640	11.09%	1	4,148	1.55%	0
2018				9,700	3.55%	0	54,242	19.88%	2							54,197	19.86%	2	36,309	13.31%	1				22,346	8.19%	1	5,003	1.83%	0				28,709	10.52%	1
2014				28,534	11.07%	1	60,691	23.54%	2							62,797	24.36%	2	27,468	10.65%	1				1,386	0.54%	0	18,219	7.07%	0				6,191	2.40%	0
2010				6,685	2.82%	0	40,437	17.04%	1	11,862	5.00%	0				92,286	38.90%	3	18,121	7.64%	1				851	0.36%	0	31,197	13.15%	1						
2006	581	0.29%	0				55,278	27.67%	3	9,395	4.70%	0				70,244	35.16%	3	14,193	7.10%	0				2,121	1.06%	0	20,808	10.41%	1						
2002	2,094	1.15%	0				38,094	20.85%	2	6,974	3.82%	0				46,432	25.41%	2	46,949	25.69%	2				8,151	4.46%	0	13,395	7.33%	1						
1998	2,926	1.75%	0							7,138	4.28%	0				60,848	36.49%	3	65,695	39.39%	3				3,476	2.08%	0	2,856	1.71%	0						
1994										16,336	9.57%	1				74,975	43.93%	3	64,394	37.73%	2															
1990	4,133	2.71%	0							14,190	9.29%	1				62,149	40.71%	2	65,980	43.22%	3															
1986	2,195	1.68%	0							13,575	10.37%	1				61,027	46.63%	3	49,103	37.52%	2															
1982	3,971	3.81%	0							7,235	6.95%	0				59,535	57.18%	4	26,550	25.50%	2															
1978	4,831	5.55%	0							7,887	9.06%	1				34,111	39.20%	3	31,960	36.73%	2	3,064	3.52%	0												
1974	1,691	2.32%	0							8,074	11.07%	1	1,973	2.71%	0	27,787	38.11%	3	2,749	3.77%	0	17,205	23.59%	2												
1970	1,779	2.95%	0							2,394	3.98%	0				32,398	53.80%	4	2,075	3.45%	0	19,278	32.02%	3												
1966																23,538	49.69%	4				18,710	39.50%	3												
1962													13,868	29.84%	2	26,102	56.16%	4				5,932	12.76%	1												
1958													3,362	13.87%	1	9,749	40.22%	3				4,197	17.32%	1												
1953																16,532	75.52%	5				1,369	6.25%	0												
1949															1			0						5												

=== Detailed ===
==== 2020s ====
===== 2022 =====
Results of the 2022 general election held on 6 February 2022:

Party		Votes per canton								Total votes	%	Seats
Party		Alva- rado	Cartago	El Guarco	Jiménez	La Unión	Orea- muno	Paraíso	Turri- alba	Total votes	%	Seats
National Liberation Party	PLN	1,989	25,780	8,632	2,110	11,677	6,385	7,638	7,651	71,862	26.89%	3
Social Christian Unity Party	PUSC	1,042	10,519	2,974	985	4,424	3,290	4,066	4,861	32,161	12.04%	1
Social Democratic Progress Party	PPSD	690	10,258	2,798	719	6,547	3,134	3,442	2,052	29,640	11.09%	1
Broad Front	FA	530	8,076	1,875	706	4,656	2,336	4,902	2,361	25,442	9.52%	1
Progressive Liberal Party	PLP	408	8,866	2,281	285	6,497	2,179	2,605	1,088	24,209	9.06%	1
New Republic Party	PNR	382	4,172	999	519	4,165	1,129	1,789	2,105	15,260	5.71%	0
New Generation Party	PNG	571	1,423	364	479	544	707	594	7,809	12,491	4.67%	0
Citizens' Action Party	PAC	173	2,015	524	240	1,035	611	625	2,855	8,078	3.02%	0
National Restoration Party	PRN	102	1,432	305	102	979	331	390	507	4,148	1.55%	0
Christian Democratic Alliance	ADC	83	2,464	265	217	206	401	301	134	4,071	1.52%	0
Accessibility without Exclusion	PASE	98	1,138	309	101	1,182	375	553	273	4,029	1.51%	0
United We Can	UP	51	1,097	450	97	401	1,171	282	140	3,689	1.38%	0
National Integration Party	PIN	54	484	93	61	2,000	175	215	293	3,375	1.26%	0
Social Christian Republican Party	PRSC	111	973	198	334	398	245	658	426	3,343	1.25%	0
National Force Party	PFN	105	915	200	65	506	344	767	315	3,217	1.20%	0
Cartago Renewal Party	RC	171	1,141	171	94	349	242	351	476	2,995	1.12%	0
Libertarian Movement	PML	51	1,036	424	49	322	292	247	229	2,650	0.99%	0
A Just Costa Rica	CRJ	51	799	299	74	334	176	244	582	2,559	0.96%	0
Liberal Union Party	UL	62	821	207	46	699	273	238	166	2,512	0.94%	0
National Encounter Party	PEN	225	1,330	85	32	116	204	150	85	2,227	0.83%	0
Let's Act Now	AY	35	714	97	34	218	329	358	76	1,861	0.70%	0
Costa Rican Social; Democratic Movement	PMSDC	50	599	196	137	202	147	191	213	1,735	0.65%	0
Costa Rican Social Justice Party	JSC	47	476	130	70	215	163	310	302	1,713	0.64%	0
Our People Party	PNP	32	224	93	68	310	91	144	109	1,071	0.40%	0
New Socialist Party	NPS	28	263	55	31	105	56	71	228	837	0.31%	0
Costa Rican Democratic Union	PUCD	14	192	27	114	59	73	51	184	714	0.27%	0
United People	PU	19	193	52	28	148	52	68	144	704	0.26%	0
Workers' Party	PT	20	209	53	18	105	63	70	70	608	0.23%	0
Valid votes		7,194	87,609	24,156	7,815	48,399	24,974	31,320	35,734	267,201	100.00%	7
Blank votes		105	798	317	105	288	228	373	437	2,651	0.97%	
Rejected votes – other		107	1,015	311	146	394	385	402	542	3,302	1.21%	
Total polled		7,406	89,422	24,784	8,066	49,081	25,587	32,095	36,713	273,154	66.64%	
Registered electors		11,495	128,069	35,809	12,781	74,519	38,162	49,474	59,569	409,878		
Turnout		64.43%	69.82%	69.21%	63.11%	65.86%	67.05%	64.87%	61.63%	66.64%		

The following candidates were elected: Johana Alemán Bonilla (PLP); Óscar Izquierdo Sandí (PLN); Rosaura Méndez Gamboa (PLN); Paola Nájera Abarca (PPSD); Antonio José Ortega Gutiérrez (FA); Alejandro José Pacheco Castro (PUSC); and Paulina María Ramírez Portuguez (PLN).

==== 2010s ====
===== 2018 =====
Results of the 2018 general election held on 4 February 2018:

Party		Votes per canton								Total votes	%	Seats
Party		Alva- rado	Cartago	El Guarco	Jiménez	La Unión	Orea- muno	Paraíso	Turri- alba	Total votes	%	Seats
Citizens' Action Party	PAC	1,485	18,896	4,774	1,382	9,262	5,339	5,590	7,514	54,242	19.88%	2
National Liberation Party	PLN	1,476	17,780	5,643	1,986	8,904	4,809	4,502	9,097	54,197	19.86%	2
Social Christian Unity Party	PUSC	796	11,543	3,432	843	7,282	2,956	2,859	6,598	36,309	13.31%	1
National Restoration Party	PRN	627	7,318	2,100	801	8,468	2,032	2,722	4,641	28,709	10.52%	1
National Integration Party	PIN	536	7,503	2,177	476	3,517	2,039	4,062	2,036	22,346	8.19%	1
Christian Democratic Alliance	ADC	228	7,241	1,366	766	1,670	1,567	1,294	1,290	15,422	5.65%	0
Social Christian Republican Party	PRSC	464	4,220	1,079	561	2,061	1,253	1,881	1,358	12,877	4.72%	0
Let's Act Now	AY	460	2,152	656	451	1,169	2,237	1,769	1,004	9,898	3.63%	0
Broad Front	FA	159	2,692	623	424	1,863	1,182	1,009	1,748	9,700	3.55%	0
New Generation Party	PNG	508	3,643	909	216	1,445	634	842	513	8,710	3.19%	0
Accessibility without Exclusion	PASE	136	1,843	452	89	847	518	2,789	396	7,070	2.59%	0
Costa Rican Renewal Party	PRC	96	2,004	324	87	530	363	3,192	314	6,910	2.53%	0
Libertarian Movement	PML	138	1,717	504	74	1,226	399	502	443	5,003	1.83%	0
Workers' Party	PT	45	468	140	51	288	162	167	180	1,501	0.55%	0
Valid votes		7,154	89,020	24,179	8,207	48,532	25,490	33,180	37,132	272,894	100.00%	7
Blank votes		64	453	174	65	160	161	229	282	1,588	0.57%	
Rejected votes – other		139	1,203	370	156	514	481	601	575	4,039	1.45%	
Total polled		7,357	90,676	24,723	8,428	49,206	26,132	34,010	37,989	278,521	71.80%	
Registered electors		10,590	121,426	33,343	12,064	70,313	36,202	46,757	57,210	387,905		
Turnout		69.47%	74.68%	74.15%	69.86%	69.98%	72.18%	72.74%	66.40%	71.80%		

The following candidates were elected: Pablo Heriberto Abarca Mora (PUSC); Mario Castillo Méndez (PAC); Luis Fernando Chacón Monge (PLN); Laura Guido Pérez (PAC); Xiomara Priscilla Rodríguez Hernández (PRN); Paola Alexandra Valladares Rosado (PLN); and Sylvia Patricia Villegas Álvarez (PIN).

===== 2014 =====
Results of the 2014 general election held on 2 February 2014:

Party		Votes per canton								Total votes	%	Seats
Party		Alva- rado	Cartago	El Guarco	Jiménez	La Unión	Orea- muno	Paraíso	Turri- alba	Total votes	%	Seats
National Liberation Party	PLN	1,487	19,968	5,768	2,469	10,316	5,430	5,465	11,894	62,797	24.36%	2
Citizens' Action Party	PAC	1,550	21,081	5,095	1,333	12,917	5,990	5,258	7,467	60,691	23.54%	2
Broad Front	FA	560	8,328	2,866	1,111	4,873	2,346	3,457	4,993	28,534	11.07%	1
Social Christian Unity Party	PUSC	1,176	4,757	1,556	1,080	2,672	2,308	9,358	4,561	27,468	10.65%	1
Christian Democratic Alliance	ADC	270	13,276	2,661	212	2,375	2,769	1,337	986	23,886	9.26%	1
Libertarian Movement	PML	479	5,943	1,499	548	3,914	1,899	1,846	2,091	18,219	7.07%	0
Accessibility without Exclusion	PASE	273	4,631	1,132	393	2,010	1,154	1,185	1,078	11,856	4.60%	0
National Restoration Party	PRN	101	1,896	508	161	1,558	517	725	725	6,191	2.40%	0
New Homeland Party	PPN	411	1,773	474	107	838	613	1,032	427	5,675	2.20%	0
Costa Rican Renewal Party	PRC	48	875	305	206	1,570	200	317	443	3,964	1.54%	0
New Generation Party	PNG	26	576	124	50	453	154	784	145	2,312	0.90%	0
Cartago Green Party	PVEC	44	596	166	45	716	200	153	228	2,148	0.83%	0
National Integration Party	PIN	23	260	86	34	659	52	89	183	1,386	0.54%	0
Workers' Party	PT	43	422	102	46	258	142	146	210	1,369	0.53%	0
National Advance	PAN	38	625	88	25	201	156	95	114	1,342	0.52%	0
Valid votes		6,529	85,007	22,430	7,820	45,330	23,930	31,247	35,545	257,838	100.00%	7
Blank votes		80	494	188	78	201	159	202	355	1,757	0.66%	
Rejected votes – other		130	1,459	434	198	686	551	735	726	4,919	1.86%	
Total polled		6,739	86,960	23,052	8,096	46,217	24,640	32,184	36,626	264,514	73.48%	
Registered electors		9,484	113,463	30,274	11,308	64,441	33,361	43,000	54,654	359,985		
Turnout		71.06%	76.64%	76.14%	71.60%	71.72%	73.86%	74.85%	67.01%	73.48%		

The following candidates were elected: José Francisco Camacho Leiva (FA); Emilia Molina Cruz (PAC); Paulina María Ramírez Portuguez (PLN); Marco Vinicio Redondo Quirós (PAC); Mario Redondo Poveda (ADC); Jorge Rodríguez Araya (PUSC); and Julio Antonio Rojas Astorga (PLN).

===== 2010 =====
Results of the 2010 general election held on 7 February 2010:

Party		Votes per canton								Total votes	%	Seats
Party		Alva- rado	Cartago	El Guarco	Jiménez	La Unión	Orea- muno	Paraíso	Turri- alba	Total votes	%	Seats
National Liberation Party	PLN	1,618	31,628	8,681	3,285	13,742	8,185	9,396	15,751	92,286	38.90%	3
Citizens' Action Party	PAC	844	13,194	3,338	1,094	7,793	3,242	4,658	6,274	40,437	17.04%	1
Libertarian Movement	PML	518	10,728	3,013	803	6,049	2,713	3,567	3,806	31,197	13.15%	1
Accessibility without Exclusion	PASE	349	6,059	1,639	443	4,897	1,493	2,157	1,738	18,775	7.91%	1
Social Christian Unity Party	PUSC	260	5,860	1,638	874	2,747	1,171	2,052	3,519	18,121	7.64%	1
Cartago Agrarian Union Party	PUAC	2,150	2,567	306	493	1,024	967	3,301	1,054	11,862	5.00%	0
Broad Front	FA	50	2,407	387	84	1,425	674	1,106	552	6,685	2.82%	0
Costa Rican Renewal Party	PRC	88	2,540	648	127	1,642	407	735	477	6,664	2.81%	0
Cartaginese Transparency Party	TC	41	874	190	96	237	1,955	359	838	4,590	1.93%	0
Cartago Green Party	PVEC	43	1,011	191	70	627	193	367	399	2,901	1.22%	0
Patriotic Alliance	AP	24	930	138	113	243	606	241	603	2,898	1.22%	0
National Integration Party	PIN	16	274	58	26	253	65	73	86	851	0.36%	0
Valid votes		6,001	78,072	20,227	7,508	40,679	21,671	28,012	35,097	237,267	100.00%	7
Blank votes		95	652	245	110	254	230	382	487	2,455	1.01%	
Rejected votes – other		167	1,109	312	165	535	453	600	619	3,960	1.63%	
Total polled		6,263	79,833	20,784	7,783	41,468	22,354	28,994	36,203	243,682	74.12%	
Registered electors		8,510	104,564	26,868	10,397	57,841	30,006	39,163	51,433	328,782		
Turnout		73.60%	76.35%	77.36%	74.86%	71.69%	74.50%	74.03%	70.39%	74.12%		

The following candidates were elected: Ileana Brenes Jiménez (PLN); Carlos Humberto Góngora Fuentes (PML); Víctor Hernández Cerdas (PAC); Martín Alcides Monestel Contreras (PASE); Luis Alfonso Pérez Gómez (PLN); José Roberto Rodríguez Quesada (PUSC); and Luis Gerardo Villanueva Monge (PLN).

==== 2000s ====
===== 2006 =====
Results of the 2006 general election held on 5 February 2006:

Party		Votes per canton								Total votes	%	Seats
Party		Alva- rado	Cartago	El Guarco	Jiménez	La Unión	Orea- muno	Paraíso	Turri- alba	Total votes	%	Seats
National Liberation Party	PLN	1,718	24,946	6,836	2,558	10,380	6,688	6,318	10,800	70,244	35.16%	3
Citizens' Action Party	PAC	1,033	18,003	3,797	1,465	9,457	4,902	6,151	10,470	55,278	27.67%	3
Libertarian Movement	PML	318	8,684	1,855	362	3,696	1,955	2,307	1,631	20,808	10.41%	1
Social Christian Unity Party	PUSC	257	4,816	1,064	375	1,424	763	2,480	3,014	14,193	7.10%	0
Cartago Agrarian Union Party	PUAC	1,225	2,834	414	334	672	1,136	1,805	975	9,395	4.70%	0
Union for Change Party	PUPC	89	1,425	390	774	1,491	396	471	464	5,500	2.75%	0
Costa Rican Renewal Party	PRC	42	966	200	88	1,587	248	406	370	3,907	1.96%	0
National Union Party	PUN	32	1,299	267	61	1,046	506	313	275	3,799	1.90%	0
Homeland First Party	PPP	38	906	255	73	667	254	477	207	2,877	1.44%	0
Provincial Integration Party	PIP	33	737	573	71	189	167	734	331	2,835	1.42%	0
National Integration Party	PIN	9	394	202	29	1,103	79	184	121	2,121	1.06%	0
Ecological Green Party	PVE	55	636	118	40	235	211	188	402	1,885	0.94%	0
Democratic Nationalist Alliance	ADN	6	412	48	14	565	45	55	458	1,603	0.80%	0
Cartago Agrarian Force	FAC	22	390	88	19	395	234	205	129	1,482	0.74%	0
Democratic Force	FD	16	273	60	22	316	174	161	345	1,367	0.68%	0
Cartago Turrialban Authentic Party	PATC	19	192	50	68	70	60	172	371	1,002	0.50%	0
Patriotic Union	UP	10	299	57	15	171	111	138	112	913	0.46%	0
United Left	IU	4	168	29	5	109	44	124	98	581	0.29%	0
Valid votes		4,926	67,380	16,303	6,373	33,573	17,973	22,689	30,573	199,790	100.00%	7
Blank votes		70	654	201	66	266	165	273	326	2,021	0.98%	
Rejected votes – other		169	1,394	449	187	707	483	705	802	4,896	2.37%	
Total polled		5,165	69,428	16,953	6,626	34,546	18,621	23,667	31,701	206,707	70.02%	
Registered electors		7,468	95,320	23,283	9,464	51,201	26,229	34,874	47,355	295,194		
Turnout		69.16%	72.84%	72.81%	70.01%	67.47%	70.99%	67.86%	66.94%	70.02%		

The following candidates were elected: Carlos Manuel Gutiérrez Gómez (PML); Orlando Manuel Hernández Murillo (PAC); Francisco Javier Marín Monge (PLN); Elsa Grettel Ortiz Álvarez (PAC); Sandra Quesada Hidalgo (PLN); Patricia Quirós Quirós (PAC); and Clara Silvia Zomer Rezler (PLN).

===== 2002 =====
Results of the 2002 general election held on 3 February 2002:

Party		Votes per canton								Total votes	%	Seats
Party		Alva- rado	Cartago	El Guarco	Jiménez	La Unión	Orea- muno	Paraíso	Turri- alba	Total votes	%	Seats
Social Christian Unity Party	PUSC	894	17,337	3,268	1,458	6,433	3,608	4,558	9,393	46,949	25.69%	2
National Liberation Party	PLN	1,214	17,585	4,945	1,437	6,152	4,056	3,821	7,222	46,432	25.41%	2
Citizens' Action Party	PAC	883	15,335	3,496	535	6,556	3,827	3,926	3,536	38,094	20.85%	2
Libertarian Movement	PML	178	4,978	1,111	225	3,140	1,290	1,339	1,134	13,395	7.33%	1
National Integration Party	PIN	142	531	106	870	538	147	315	5,502	8,151	4.46%	0
Cartago Agrarian Union Party	PUAC	735	2,241	205	767	194	1,295	892	645	6,974	3.82%	0
Democratic Force	FD	166	1,042	363	189	646	436	3,371	594	6,807	3.72%	0
Independent Workers' Party	PIO	101	228	194	58	4,244	311	180	73	5,389	2.95%	0
Costa Rican Renewal Party	PRC	33	949	142	92	1,258	225	577	416	3,692	2.02%	0
Coalition Change 2000	CC2000	23	613	184	24	276	186	387	401	2,094	1.15%	0
Cartago Agrarian Force	FAC	33	432	264	58	145	174	143	141	1,390	0.76%	0
National Convergence Party	PCN	57	557	50	20	78	166	394	26	1,348	0.74%	0
National Patriotic Party	PPN	9	188	43	21	125	49	76	109	620	0.34%	0
National Christian Alliance	ANC	10	162	30	29	133	47	58	109	578	0.32%	0
General Union Party	PUGEN	9	189	37	12	150	70	31	37	535	0.29%	0
National Rescue Party	PRN	3	83	25	5	56	23	47	53	295	0.16%	0
Valid votes		4,490	62,450	14,463	5,800	30,124	15,910	20,115	29,391	182,743	100.00%	7
Blank votes		84	590	225	82	297	182	304	433	2,197	1.16%	
Rejected votes – other		132	1,053	334	231	705	363	661	732	4,211	2.23%	
Total polled		4,706	64,093	15,022	6,113	31,126	16,455	21,080	30,556	189,151	72.29%	
Registered electors		6,597	84,979	20,036	8,634	44,746	23,047	30,255	43,348	261,642		
Turnout		71.34%	75.42%	74.98%	70.80%	69.56%	71.40%	69.67%	70.49%	72.29%		

The following candidates were elected: Nury Garita Sánchez (PLN); Carlos Herrera Calvo (PML); Ruth María Montoya Rojas (PAC); Mario Redondo Poveda (PUSC); María del Rocío Ulloa Solano (PUSC); Gerardo Vargas Leiva (PAC); and Luis Gerardo Villanueva Monge (PLN).

==== 1990s ====
===== 1998 =====
Results of the 1998 general election held on 1 February 1998:

Party		Votes per canton								Total votes	%	Seats
Party		Alva- rado	Cartago	El Guarco	Jiménez	La Unión	Orea- muno	Paraíso	Turri- alba	Total votes	%	Seats
Social Christian Unity Party	PUSC	1,793	21,056	4,849	2,062	9,665	5,909	5,986	14,375	65,695	39.39%	3
National Liberation Party	PLN	1,494	22,033	4,955	2,031	9,206	5,223	6,433	9,473	60,848	36.49%	3
Democratic Force	FD	186	2,235	380	279	2,332	489	606	2,065	8,572	5.14%	0
Cartago Agrarian Union Party	PUAC	532	2,786	297	936	239	1,038	873	437	7,138	4.28%	0
National Integration Party	PIN	41	1,144	171	130	1,073	192	291	434	3,476	2.08%	0
National Independent Party	PNI	38	884	1,725	40	169	241	93	188	3,378	2.03%	0
United People	PU	14	256	34	22	135	47	2,325	93	2,926	1.75%	0
Libertarian Movement	PML	38	1,082	221	50	873	168	216	208	2,856	1.71%	0
National Convergence Party	PCN	30	763	116	54	40	378	701	115	2,197	1.32%	0
Democratic Party	PD	11	845	165	19	526	135	152	68	1,921	1.15%	0
Cartago Agrarian Force	FAC	51	886	205	100	127	177	231	115	1,892	1.13%	0
Costa Rican Renewal Party	PRC	9	351	53	18	936	71	107	75	1,620	0.97%	0
National Christian Alliance	ANC	14	492	78	75	273	115	90	217	1,354	0.81%	0
New Democratic Party	NPD	2	173	12	4	798	15	24	42	1,070	0.64%	0
General Union Party	PUGEN	6	243	275	13	60	39	40	40	716	0.43%	0
National Rescue Party	PRN	5	109	28	13	87	23	95	323	683	0.41%	0
Independent Party	PI	6	79	31	13	34	13	25	229	430	0.26%	0
Valid votes		4,270	55,417	13,595	5,859	26,573	14,273	18,288	28,497	166,772	100.00%	6
Blank votes		56	442	178	91	161	143	247	340	1,658	0.96%	
Rejected votes – other		118	1,109	413	193	549	366	662	714	4,124	2.39%	
Total polled		4,444	56,968	14,186	6,143	27,283	14,782	19,197	29,551	172,554	74.39%	
Registered electors		5,929	74,739	18,310	8,138	38,863	19,876	25,952	40,163	231,970		
Turnout		74.95%	76.22%	77.48%	75.49%	70.20%	74.37%	73.97%	73.58%	74.39%		

The following candidates were elected: Ovidio Antonio Pacheco Salazar (PUSC); Rodolfo Salas Salas (PLN); Ricardo Sancho Chavarría (PLN); Belisario Solano Solano (PUSC); Álvaro Torres Guerrero (PLN); and Rafael Ángel Villalta Loaiza (PUSC).

===== 1994 =====
Results of the 1994 general election held on 6 February 1994:

Party		Votes per canton								Total votes	%	Seats
Party		Alva- rado	Cartago	El Guarco	Jiménez	La Unión	Orea- muno	Paraíso	Turri- alba	Total votes	%	Seats
National Liberation Party	PLN	1,711	24,722	7,126	3,087	11,324	6,318	7,088	13,599	74,975	43.93%	3
Social Christian Unity Party	PUSC	1,291	20,764	5,061	1,945	10,965	5,732	6,530	12,106	64,394	37.73%	2
Cartago Agrarian Union Party	PUAC	1,359	6,135	583	1,099	866	1,781	2,829	1,684	16,336	9.57%	1
Democratic Force	FD	30	1,418	221	85	1,828	250	604	1,342	5,778	3.39%	0
General Union Party	PUGEN	20	1,692	268	35	1,141	292	387	381	4,216	2.47%	0
National Christian Alliance	ANC	16	383	73	41	605	68	121	199	1,506	0.88%	0
People's Vanguard Party	PVP	17	378	61	26	203	101	71	274	1,131	0.66%	0
National Independent Party	PNI	11	322	44	22	168	228	186	64	1,045	0.61%	0
National Convergence Party	PCN	17	399	102	50	43	119	73	61	864	0.51%	0
Independent Party	PI	3	106	16	18	87	31	45	117	423	0.25%	0
Valid votes		4,475	56,319	13,555	6,408	27,230	14,920	17,934	29,827	170,668	100.00%	6
Blank votes		50	525	196	65	232	166	226	379	1,839	1.04%	
Rejected votes – other		213	1,115	256	235	525	423	749	869	4,385	2.48%	
Total polled		4,738	57,959	14,007	6,708	27,987	15,509	18,909	31,075	176,892	83.71%	
Registered electors		5,628	68,082	16,216	8,076	34,234	18,418	22,837	37,816	211,307		
Turnout		84.19%	85.13%	86.38%	83.06%	81.75%	84.21%	82.80%	82.17%	83.71%		

The following candidates were elected: Mary Albán López (PUSC); Hernán Bravo Trejos (PUSC); Cachimbal (PUAC); Jorge Walter Coto Molina (PLN); María Luisa Ortiz Meseguer (PLN); and Luis Gerardo Villanueva Monge (PLN).

===== 1990 =====
Results of the 1990 general election held on 4 February 1990:

Party		Votes per canton								Total votes	%	Seats
Party		Alva- rado	Cartago	El Guarco	Jiménez	La Unión	Orea- muno	Paraíso	Turri- alba	Total votes	%	Seats
Social Christian Unity Party	PUSC	1,512	22,169	5,367	1,970	10,859	5,929	6,002	12,172	65,980	43.22%	3
National Liberation Party	PLN	1,253	22,432	5,792	2,339	9,193	5,517	4,660	10,963	62,149	40.71%	2
Cartago Agrarian Union Party	PUAC	1,133	4,229	338	1,240	518	1,548	3,809	1,375	14,190	9.29%	1
United People	PU	10	747	79	112	819	127	255	1,984	4,133	2.71%	0
General Union Party	PUGEN	25	835	164	72	590	205	389	128	2,408	1.58%	0
National Christian Alliance	ANC	21	380	43	50	538	92	97	234	1,455	0.95%	0
National Independent Party	PNI	19	405	151	45	137	82	77	380	1,296	0.85%	0
Party of Progress	PdP	5	96	11	108	68	12	87	436	823	0.54%	0
Independent Party	PI	5	59	11	11	32	20	22	70	230	0.15%	0
Valid votes		3,983	51,352	11,956	5,947	22,754	13,532	15,398	27,742	152,664	100.00%	6
Blank votes		45	393	146	70	182	115	168	390	1,509	0.95%	
Rejected votes – other		213	1,145	265	342	579	495	868	869	4,776	3.00%	
Total polled		4,241	52,890	12,367	6,359	23,515	14,142	16,434	29,001	158,949	85.01%	
Registered electors		5,083	61,273	14,123	7,635	28,069	16,508	19,391	34,887	186,969		
Turnout		83.43%	86.32%	87.57%	83.29%	83.78%	85.67%	84.75%	83.13%	85.01%		

The following candidates were elected: Ovidio Antonio Pacheco Salazar (PUSC); Jorge Rodríguez Araya (PUAC); Rafael Sanabria Solano (PUSC); Daisy Serrano Vargas (PLN); Federico Vargas Peralta (PLN); and Guillermo Arturo Zúñiga Trigueros (PUSC).

==== 1980s ====
===== 1986 =====
Results of the 1986 general election held on 2 February 1986:

Party		Votes per canton								Total votes	%	Seats
Party		Alva- rado	Cartago	El Guarco	Jiménez	La Unión	Orea- muno	Paraíso	Turri- alba	Total votes	%	Seats
National Liberation Party	PLN	980	21,629	5,255	2,747	8,615	5,077	5,674	11,050	61,027	46.63%	3
Social Christian Unity Party	PUSC	901	16,872	3,995	1,648	7,475	4,287	4,821	9,104	49,103	37.52%	2
Cartago Agrarian Union Party	PUAC	1,412	4,313	422	936	879	1,838	1,823	1,952	13,575	10.37%	1
People's Alliance Coalition	CAP	10	358	39	69	407	61	94	1,227	2,265	1.73%	0
United People	PU	16	690	73	66	512	87	350	401	2,195	1.68%	0
National Christian Alliance	ANC	29	352	69	70	496	74	142	467	1,699	1.30%	0
National Republican Party	PNR	14	188	48	57	88	52	76	324	847	0.65%	0
General Union Party	PUGEN	2	47	14	5	22	8	29	33	160	0.12%	0
Valid votes		3,364	44,449	9,915	5,598	18,494	11,484	13,009	24,558	130,871	100.00%	6
Blank votes		35	340	101	87	162	103	142	272	1,242	0.91%	
Rejected votes – other		341	1,039	257	271	497	518	690	983	4,596	3.36%	
Total polled		3,740	45,828	10,273	5,956	19,153	12,105	13,841	25,813	136,709	84.67%	
Registered electors		4,482	53,218	11,747	7,020	23,011	14,297	16,509	31,183	161,467		
Turnout		83.44%	86.11%	87.45%	84.84%	83.23%	84.67%	83.84%	82.78%	84.67%		

The following candidates were elected: Allen Ramón Arias Angulo (PLN); Cachimbal (PUAC); José Miguel Corrales Bolaños (PLN); Norma Jiménez Quirós (PUSC); Carlos Manuel Monge Rodríguez (PUSC); and Jorge Rossi Chavarría (PLN).

===== 1982 =====
Results of the 1982 general election held on 7 February 1982:

Party		Votes per canton								Total votes	%	Seats
Party		Alva- rado	Cartago	El Guarco	Jiménez	La Unión	Orea- muno	Paraíso	Turri- alba	Total votes	%	Seats
National Liberation Party	PLN	1,530	21,249	4,423	3,019	7,508	5,287	5,420	11,099	59,535	57.18%	4
Unity Coalition	CU	554	9,520	2,304	922	3,952	2,254	2,482	4,562	26,550	25.50%	2
Cartago Agrarian Union Party	PUAC	670	1,832	151	517	412	609	927	2,117	7,235	6.95%	0
United People	PU	22	1,227	103	111	811	178	288	1,231	3,971	3.81%	0
National Movement	MN	21	982	205	80	330	238	141	329	2,326	2.23%	0
Independent Party	PI	19	589	36	24	41	156	44	304	1,213	1.16%	0
Cartago Parliamentary Union Party	UPC	4	193	22	36	34	81	540	137	1,047	1.01%	0
Worker-Peasant Party	POC	11	276	23	4	19	82	497	64	976	0.94%	0
National Democratic Party	PND	10	174	31	21	57	201	54	116	664	0.64%	0
Costa Rican Concord Party	PCC	2	136	12	10	45	32	31	52	320	0.31%	0
Democratic Party	PD	5	80	9	10	49	26	46	62	287	0.28%	0
Valid votes		2,848	36,258	7,319	4,754	13,258	9,144	10,470	20,073	104,124	100.00%	6
Blank votes		44	296	115	63	125	114	123	290	1,170	1.08%	
Rejected votes – other		157	769	189	219	332	310	666	862	3,504	3.22%	
Total polled		3,049	37,323	7,623	5,036	13,715	9,568	11,259	21,225	108,798	81.35%	
Registered electors		3,861	44,708	9,103	6,113	17,262	11,834	14,040	26,821	133,742		
Turnout		78.97%	83.48%	83.74%	82.38%	79.45%	80.85%	80.19%	79.14%	81.35%		

The following candidates were elected: Rogelio Carazo Paredes (CU); Holman Esquivel Garrote (PLN); Fernando Guzmán Mata (PLN); Carlos León Camacho (PLN); Carlos Alberto Rivera Bianchini (PLN); and José Roberto Rodríguez Quesada (CU).

==== 1970s ====
===== 1978 =====
Results of the 1978 general election held on 5 February 1978:

Party		Votes per canton								Total votes	%	Seats
Party		Alva- rado	Cartago	El Guarco	Jiménez	La Unión	Orea- muno	Paraíso	Turri- alba	Total votes	%	Seats
National Liberation Party	PLN	849	11,398	2,593	2,149	4,448	2,780	2,855	7,039	34,111	39.20%	3
Unity Coalition	CU	696	11,482	2,402	1,151	4,463	2,897	3,181	5,688	31,960	36.73%	2
Cartago Agrarian Union Party	PUAC	737	2,750	286	401	131	881	1,409	1,292	7,887	9.06%	1
United People	PU	15	1,510	141	340	847	199	503	1,276	4,831	5.55%	0
National Unification Party	PUN	45	948	237	94	205	174	266	1,095	3,064	3.52%	0
Republican Union Party	PUR	39	310	83	62	153	94	155	763	1,659	1.91%	0
National Independent Party	PNI	24	434	61	43	95	146	156	171	1,130	1.30%	0
Independent Party	PI	13	288	35	35	175	64	161	199	970	1.11%	0
Costa Rican Concord Party	PCC	7	555	28	14	15	45	89	98	851	0.98%	0
Democratic Party	PD	15	172	17	31	43	44	76	149	547	0.63%	0
Valid votes		2,440	29,847	5,883	4,320	10,575	7,324	8,851	17,770	87,010	100.00%	6
Blank votes		56	442	121	89	139	132	237	357	1,573	1.70%	
Rejected votes – other		232	895	245	281	307	377	634	851	3,822	4.14%	
Total polled		2,728	31,184	6,249	4,690	11,021	7,833	9,722	18,978	92,405	82.33%	
Registered electors		3,416	37,419	7,513	5,552	13,356	9,701	11,890	23,395	112,242		
Turnout		79.86%	83.34%	83.18%	84.47%	82.52%	80.74%	81.77%	81.12%	82.33%		

The following candidates were elected: Ramón Aguilar Facio (CU); Mario Enrique Coto Varela (PLN); Mario Rojas Vega (CU); Martín Rolando Brenes (PUAC); Carlos Solano Salazar (PLN); and Ángel Edmundo Solano Calderón (PLN).

===== 1974 =====
Results of the 1974 general election held on 3 February 1974:

Party		Votes per canton								Total votes	%	Seats
Party		Alva- rado	Cartago	El Guarco	Jiménez	La Unión	Orea- muno	Paraíso	Turri- alba	Total votes	%	Seats
National Liberation Party	PLN	739	8,904	2,336	1,704	3,240	1,923	2,813	6,128	27,787	38.11%	3
National Unification Party	PUN	353	4,337	1,200	1,133	2,501	844	2,096	4,741	17,205	23.59%	2
National Independent Party	PNI	264	3,678	501	333	458	1,395	513	1,568	8,710	11.94%	1
Cartago Agrarian Union Party	PUAC	771	3,628	156	301	272	1,122	1,453	371	8,074	11.07%	1
Democratic Renewal Party	PRD	31	1,009	277	98	425	248	193	575	2,856	3.92%	0
Christian Democratic Party	PDC	25	1,243	93	248	95	124	119	802	2,749	3.77%	0
National Republican Party	PRN	26	793	97	75	268	72	134	508	1,973	2.71%	0
Socialist Action Party	PASO	21	504	42	68	263	69	117	607	1,691	2.32%	0
Democratic Party	PD	7	217	18	27	334	39	68	238	948	1.30%	0
Independent Party	PI	20	255	22	25	23	58	44	55	502	0.69%	0
Costa Rican Socialist Party	PSC	10	150	17	22	48	61	39	78	425	0.58%	0
Valid votes		2,267	24,718	4,759	4,034	7,927	5,955	7,589	15,671	72,920	100.00%	7
Blank votes		46	405	109	87	137	137	175	385	1,481	1.91%	
Rejected votes – other		173	865	147	224	184	267	482	665	3,007	3.88%	
Total polled		2,486	25,988	5,015	4,345	8,248	6,359	8,246	16,721	77,408	82.59%	
Registered electors		3,135	30,953	6,167	5,207	9,824	7,823	9,952	20,667	93,728		
Turnout		79.30%	83.96%	81.32%	83.45%	83.96%	81.29%	82.86%	80.91%	82.59%		

The following candidates were elected: Cachimbal (PUAC); José Miguel Corrales Bolaños (PLN); Álvaro Fuentes Ramos (PLN); Abdenago Herrera Carvajal (PUN); Julio Molina Siverio (PUN); María Luisa Portuguez Calderón (PLN); and Álvaro Torres Vincenzi (PNI).

===== 1970 =====
Results of the 1970 general election held on 1 February 1970:

Party		Votes per canton								Total votes	%	Seats
Party		Alva- rado	Cartago	El Guarco	Jiménez	La Unión	Orea- muno	Paraíso	Turri- alba	Total votes	%	Seats
National Liberation Party	PLN	1,039	10,823	2,484	2,262	3,244	2,520	2,856	7,170	32,398	53.80%	4
National Unification Party	PUN	435	6,591	1,190	1,269	1,771	1,351	1,857	4,814	19,278	32.02%	3
Cartago Agrarian Union Party	PUAC	364	566	39	68	34	287	733	303	2,394	3.98%	0
Christian Democratic Party	PDC	10	1,292	78	21	138	120	157	259	2,075	3.45%	0
Socialist Action Party	PASO	41	465	14	61	364	70	89	675	1,779	2.95%	0
National Front Party	PFN	55	369	50	93	112	79	187	476	1,421	2.36%	0
Costa Rican Renewal Movement	MRC	10	275	28	6	27	13	43	47	449	0.75%	0
National Union Party	PUN	5	67	6	102	23	15	59	144	421	0.70%	0
Valid votes		1,959	20,448	3,889	3,882	5,713	4,455	5,981	13,888	60,215	100.00%	7
Blank votes		46	370	109	77	148	122	155	378	1,405	2.17%	
Rejected votes – other		177	765	154	268	225	334	589	758	3,270	5.04%	
Total polled		2,182	21,583	4,152	4,227	6,086	4,911	6,725	15,024	64,890	85.99%	
Registered electors		2,552	24,645	4,821	4,803	6,917	5,774	7,838	18,108	75,458		
Turnout		85.50%	87.58%	86.12%	88.01%	87.99%	85.05%	85.80%	82.97%	85.99%		

The following candidates were elected: Eladio Alonso Andrés (PLN); Rogelio Carazo Paredes (PUN); Rodolfo Leiva Runnebaum (PUN); Yolanda Otárola Prendigas (PLN); Emilio Piedra Jiménez (PUN); Ángel Edmundo Solano Calderón (PLN); and Jorge Solano Chacón (PLN).

==== 1960s ====
===== 1966 =====
Results of the 1966 general election held on 6 February 1966:

Party		Votes per canton								Total votes	%	Seats
Party		Alva- rado	Cartago	El Guarco	Jiménez	La Unión	Orea- muno	Paraíso	Turri- alba	Total votes	%	Seats
National Liberation Party	PLN	830	7,759	1,607	2,150	2,181	1,821	1,836	5,354	23,538	49.69%	4
National Unification Party	PUN	392	6,072	1,090	1,047	1,922	1,132	1,860	5,195	18,710	39.50%	3
Revolutionary Civic Union	UCR	61	951	141	106	234	150	280	649	2,572	5.43%	0
Democratic Party	PD	160	948	43	59	58	249	502	531	2,550	5.38%	0
Valid votes		1,443	15,730	2,881	3,362	4,395	3,352	4,478	11,729	47,370	100.00%	7
Blank votes		38	279	83	87	98	83	149	295	1,112	2.10%	
Rejected votes – other		137	1,305	218	275	256	406	671	1,202	4,470	8.44%	
Total polled		1,618	17,314	3,182	3,724	4,749	3,841	5,298	13,226	52,952	82.82%	
Registered electors		2,077	20,529	3,941	4,411	5,635	4,627	6,453	16,264	63,937		
Turnout		77.90%	84.34%	80.74%	84.43%	84.28%	83.01%	82.10%	81.32%	82.82%		

The following candidates were elected: Uriel Arrieta Salas (PUN); Halley Guardia Herrero (PUN); Fernando Guzmán Mata (PLN); Manuel Patiño Troyo (PUN); Numa Fernando Ruiz Solórzano (PLN); Hernán Vargas Ramírez (PLN); and Jorge Luis Villanueva Badilla (PLN).

===== 1962 =====
Results of the 1962 general election held on 4 February 1962:

Party		Votes per canton								Total votes	%	Seats
Party		Alva- rado	Cartago	El Guarco	Jiménez	La Unión	Orea- muno	Paraíso	Turri- alba	Total votes	%	Seats
National Liberation Party	PLN	1,078	9,290	1,820	1,964	2,208	2,012	2,080	5,650	26,102	56.16%	4
Republican Party	PR	332	3,210	511	1,034	1,686	388	1,681	5,026	13,868	29.84%	2
National Union Party	PUN	274	2,520	316	317	369	671	601	864	5,932	12.76%	1
Popular Democratic Action	PADP	10	225	5	26	44	13	39	212	574	1.24%	0
Valid votes		1,694	15,245	2,652	3,341	4,307	3,084	4,401	11,752	46,476	100.00%	7
Blank votes		42	262	61	76	101	103	183	279	1,107	2.29%	
Rejected votes – other		33	148	34	73	57	55	94	217	711	1.47%	
Total polled		1,769	15,655	2,747	3,490	4,465	3,242	4,678	12,248	48,294	85.22%	
Registered electors		2,194	17,992	3,403	4,071	5,009	3,900	5,588	14,513	56,670		
Turnout		80.63%	87.01%	80.72%	85.73%	89.14%	83.13%	83.72%	84.39%	85.22%		

The following candidates were elected: Jesús Benavides Murillo (PLN); Minor Calvo Ortega (PLN); José Hernán García Fonseca (PR); Joaquín Garro Jiménez (PLN); Nora Murillo Saborío (PLN); José Joaquín Peralta Esquivel (PUN); and Guillermo Yglesias Flores (PR).

==== 1950s ====
===== 1958 =====
Results of the 1958 general election held on 2 February 1958:

Party		Votes per canton								Total votes	%	Seats
Party		Alva- rado	Cartago	El Guarco	Jiménez	La Unión	Orea- muno	Paraíso	Turri- alba	Total votes	%	Seats
National Liberation Party	PLN	454	3,155	821	880	915	729	1,002	1,793	9,749	40.22%	3
Independent Party	PI	271	1,511	164	244	226	330	387	1,730	4,863	20.06%	1
National Union Party	PUN	97	1,189	265	444	307	255	525	1,115	4,197	17.32%	1
National Republican Party	PRN	113	979	135	188	398	82	361	1,106	3,362	13.87%	1
Revolutionary Civic Union	UCR	15	678	48	20	52	151	47	160	1,171	4.83%	0
National Republican Party	PRN	20	241	18	22	72	27	55	159	614	2.53%	0
Democratic Opposition Movement	MDO	6	34	6	15	17	13	15	58	164	0.68%	0
Democratic Party	PD	4	19	2	11	19	16	20	27	118	0.49%	0
Valid votes		980	7,806	1,459	1,824	2,006	1,603	2,412	6,148	24,238	100.00%	6
Blank votes		35	178	34	88	88	78	97	263	861	3.17%	
Rejected votes – other		62	558	82	175	218	145	240	600	2,080	7.65%	
Total polled		1,077	8,542	1,575	2,087	2,312	1,826	2,749	7,011	27,179	66.93%	
Registered electors		1,862	12,419	2,581	3,048	3,229	2,895	4,123	10,450	40,607		
Turnout		57.84%	68.78%	61.02%	68.47%	71.60%	63.07%	66.67%	67.09%	66.93%		

The following candidates were elected: Eladio Alonso Andrés (PLN); José Rafael Cordero Croceri (PLN); Fernando Guzmán Mata (PI); Mario Leiva Quirós (PUN); Humberto Saborío Bravo (PLN); and Rodrigo Sancho Robles (PRN).

===== 1953 =====
Results of the 1953 general election held on 26 July 1953:

Party		Votes per canton								Total votes	%	Seats
Party		Alva- rado	Cartago	El Guarco	Jiménez	La Unión	Orea- muno	Paraíso	Turri- alba	Total votes	%	Seats
National Liberation Party	PLN	916	5,796	1,050	1,206	1,301	1,446	1,497	3,320	16,532	75.52%	5
Democratic Party	PD	142	1,171	229	151	432	105	434	1,326	3,990	18.23%	1
National Union Party	PUN	27	517	16	98	93	102	275	241	1,369	6.25%	0
Valid votes		1,085	7,484	1,295	1,455	1,826	1,653	2,206	4,887	21,891	100.00%	6
Blank votes		53	259	41	38	99	105	202	266	1,063	4.33%	
Rejected votes – other		62	372	57	115	166	73	222	532	1,599	6.51%	
Total polled		1,200	8,115	1,393	1,608	2,091	1,831	2,630	5,685	24,553	70.19%	
Registered electors		1,727	10,961	2,220	2,353	2,662	2,493	3,695	8,868	34,979		
Turnout		69.48%	74.04%	62.75%	68.34%	78.55%	73.45%	71.18%	64.11%	70.19%		

The following candidates were elected: Francisco Bonilla Wepold (PLN); Joaquín Garro Jiménez (PLN); José Joaquín Peralta Esquivel (PD); Víctor Alberto Quirós Sasso (PLN); Manuel Francisco Solano Madríz (PLN); and Fernando Volio Sancho (PLN).

==== 1940s ====
===== 1949 =====
The following candidates were elected at the 1949 general election held on 4 October 1949: Mario Leiva Quirós (PUN); Jorge Mandas Chacón (PUN); Alberto Morúa Rivera (PUN); Gonzalo Ortiz Martín (PUN); Rafael Quesada Casal (PUN); Roberto Salazar Mata (PC); and Álvaro Torres Vicenzi (PUC).
