= Calderonism =

Political ideology of Rafael Ángel Calderón Guardia

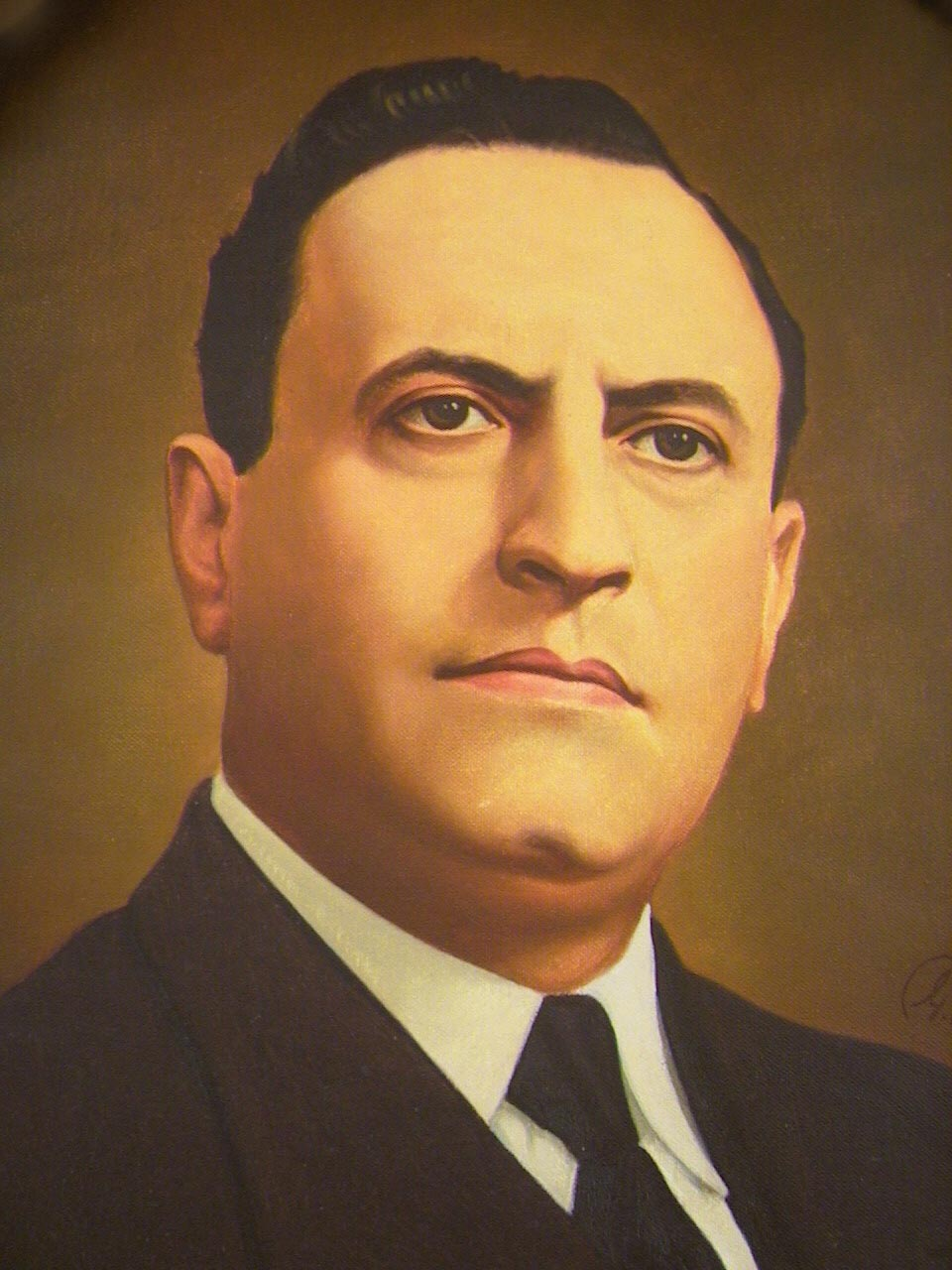
Rafael Ángel Calderón Guardia, after whom Calderonism is named

Calderonism (Spanish: Calderonismo) is a political and ideological doctrine of Costa Rica, which emerged in the 1940s under the leadership of caudillo Dr. Rafael Ángel Calderón Guardia, before, during and after he was president with his National Republican Party, and which was continued by various political forces such as the Unity Coalition, National Unification Party and the current Social Christian Unity Party and its split the Social Christian Republican Party. It is, with Liberacionismo, one of the two traditional political tendencies of Costa Rican politics, with which it represented a certain type of Costa Rican bipartisanship from 1986 to 2002 and revolves around the Calderón family. It is a form of populist and Catholic Christian socialism very similar to Argentine Peronism. Considered a progressive interpretation of the Catholic social teaching, as well as a form of socialism, Calderonism identifies itself with comunismo a la tica, defined as indigenous and Catholic communism exclusive to Costa Rica. Because of this, Calderonism is also referred to as calderocomunismo.

Calderonist policies "integrated Marxist, social Christian and state bureaucratic tendencies", and have been described as socialist, social democratic, and social Catholic. Calderón formed an alliance between the Catholic Church and the communist party to carry out socialist reforms — to this end, Calderonism is considered a precursor to liberation theology. Calderonism is described as very similar to the "spiritual socialism" of Guatemalan President Juan José Arévalo, as both movements pursued expansive worker rights, public health and social security programs. Calderón's reforms greatly empowered the Costa Rican trade unions and labor force, providing them with constitutional guarantees and strictly enforced judicial protection; communist trade unions and Catholic labor confederations rapidly grew and built a union movement. Calderonism also directly challenged the powerful domestic and foreign business interests of Costa Rica, sparking business-based opposition and subversion; Calderonism is credited with reorienting the state as an instrument of the working class.

== History ==
Calderonism was born with the political leadership of Dr. Rafael Ángel Calderón Guardia. His administration (1940–1944) has been traditionally controversial. During his tenure the University of Costa Rica was created, the border problem with Panama was solved through the Echandi-Fernández treaty and in alliance with the Catholic Church and the Costa Rican Communist Party, the Labor Code and the Social Guarantees were promulgated. At the same time, the opposition accused Calderón of authoritarianism, corruption and persecution of political opponents and ethnic minorities (particularly Germans, Italians and Japanese after the Pearl Harbor attacks with Costa Rica joining World War II as part of the Allies).

Calderón promoted his reforms as "based on a point of view entirely Christian". He established a nationwide universal healthcare system, social security payments for all retired workers, a housing program for the workers, and other measures that raised the living standards of the country's working class. Calderón's Labor Code provided a wide variety of privileges for the workers and trade unions, including enforced minimum quality of working conditions, the right to association, collective bargaining, the right to strike, and a judicial mechanism that would force the employers to consider and implement the demands of trade unions, was the court to rule in their favor. Calderón's reforms spurred a rapid growth of trade unions in Costa Rica, and trade unions of both Catholic and communist orientation swelled in numbers. At the same time, Calderón's reforms were extremely unpopular amongst the Costa Rican corporations. Calderonism began to be labelled as calderocomunismo, by both Calderón's supporters and opponents.

Calderonism was met with extensive opposition from employers, which led to the Costa Rican oligarchy plotting a coup against Calderón. The Costa Rican communists were also approached regarding critical support for the possible overthrow of Calderón. However, the Communist Party of Costa Rica chose to align with Calderón instead, citing his "impressive social reforms" and openness towards socialism. Calderonism was strongly supported by the poor and the workers, although the opposition composed of middle-class and business sectors became increasingly organized and powerful.

Calderón ruled directly from 1940 to 1944, and his chosen candidate, Teodoro Picado Michalski won the 1944 Costa Rican general election as part of a Republican-Communist coalition named the Victory Bloc and in the middle of increasing political tensions.

In the 1948 election Calderón was again a candidate for the presidency. The National Electoral Court provisionally declared the opposition candidate, Otilio Ulate Blanco, elected, but Calderón Guardia filed a claim of fraud and presented to Congress a nullity of the presidential elections, although not of the legislative ones, in which his supporters had obtained a majority. On March 1, 1948, Congress—where the alliance of Calderonists and communists had a majority—annulled the presidential elections. While many argue that Calderón robbed the opposition of its rightful victory, there is a strong indication that Guardia was actually the victor in the 1948 election. This caused a civil war, in which government forces were defeated militarily by those of rebel caudillo José Figueres Ferrer. Calderón went into exile in Nicaragua, and in December 1948 he invaded Costa Rica with support from the government of Nicaraguan dictator Anastasio Somoza García, but the expedition, known as the counterrevolution, failed. Calderón moved with his family to Mexico, and in 1955 he undertook a second invasion of Costa Rica, with the support of Somoza García, Rafael Leónidas Trujillo and Marcos Pérez Jiménez, but his forces were defeated again. The rebel forces seized the border town of Villa Quesada on 12 January.

With the Republicans and Communists outlawed the Constituent Assembly of Costa Rica was convened in 1949, enabling the current Costa Rican Constitution. Figueres (who ruled de facto for 18 months before giving power to Ulate in 1949) was subsequently a formal candidate by the newly formed National Liberation Party, winning the 1953 Costa Rican general election. Calderón called for the population to abstain. In 1958, the presidential candidate for the National Union Party, Mario Echandi, promised to bring back Calderón and family from exile and sign a general amnesty if elected and received the vote in bloc of the Calderonistas.

Calderón was candidate to Congress in exile and won a seat as deputy, returning in 1958 thanks the Echandi's amnesty. He was a presidential candidate again in 1962, and despite his defeat, until his death he continued to be a very influential political figure. He was Ambassador of Costa Rica to Mexico from 1966 to 1969 and was declared Benemerito de la Patria (benefactor of the homeland, the greatest honor conferred to nationals in Costa Rica) by the Legislative Assembly of Costa Rica, on April 17, 1974, by agreement No. 1410.

In the 1978 election, Rodrigo Carazo Odio was elected president with the support of Calderonistas under the banner of a coalition of parties called the Unity Coalition, formed by the Calderonist Republican Party, the Christian Democratic Party, the Democratic Renewal Party and the Popular Union Party. However, by 1981 when the struggles for the election of the candidate for the 1982 elections begin, problems arise between the candidate Rafael Ángel Calderón Fournier of the Calderonista Republican Party and Rodolfo Méndez Mata, mostly represented by the Democratic Renewal Party. Shortly after, and also with the support of the Democratic Renewal Party, Rodrigo Madrigal Nieto tried to register his candidacy. In these circumstances of struggle of tendencies the Calderonista Republican, Popular Union and Christian Democratic parties decided to go alone to the election and changed the flag of the coalition for another with the colors red and blue (the modern colors of PUSC). However, at the end of August 1981, Democratic Renewal returned to the Coalition and took part in it. The conditions of the campaign were unfavorable as the party had to bear the unpopularity of Carazo's government. Knowing that he had no chance of winning, Calderón Fournier's campaign focused on saving the coalition and the future party. The result obtained was 34% of votes but the bloc remained as the second most voted force, considered a success given the circumstances.

In April 1983, the Political Directory of the coalition adopted a calendar, and it was immediately agreed that the Popular Union Party would serve as the receiver of the other three, changing its name to that of Social Christian Unity Party. The National Assemblies of each party participating in said coalition had to agree, in advance, to its dissolution to immediately give way to the merger. Legally this implied that as long as the new party existed, none of the merged parties could re-register. On December 17, 1983, at the last session of the National Assemblies of the parties that formed the Unity Coalition, they agreed to dissolve and merge into one. In 1984, they begin the steps for the election of the candidate for the 1986 elections. Rafael Ángel Calderón Fournier and Óscar Aguilar Bulgarelli registered as pre-candidates; however, at the beginning of the campaign, Bulgarelli dropped from the race. With only one pre-candidate left, the convention was suspended and on December 2, 1984, Rafael Ángel Calderón Fournier was selected as the presidential candidate.

On February 2, 1986, the electoral result favored the rival National Liberation Party's nominee, Oscar Arias Sánchez by a difference of 6.5%; however, PUSC managed to elect 25 deputies while its presidential candidate had received 45.8% of the valid votes, making clear the existence of a two-party system.

In 1987, work began for a new participation in the elections. Miguel Ángel Rodríguez began his political career as a candidate, as did Germán Serrano Pinto. Because of defeats suffered in the 1982 and 1986 elections, Calderón Fournier retired from an eventual candidacy, and supported Rodriguez. However, the party base expected a new candidacy from Calderón. Polls began to show strong support for Calderón. In December 1987, Serrano decided to withdraw his candidacy and seek an agreement with Rodríguez. Meanwhile, there had been clashes between Rodriguez and Calderón for the list of candidates for deputies, which caused many leaders to begin to support Calderón's candidacy. Shortly after a movement was generated, which started mainly from the PUSC deputies, to formally request Rafael Ángel Calderón Fournier to be a candidate for the presidency again. After two consecutive periods of the PLN in power, and the demonstration of strength of the PUSC in the 1986 elections, the prospects for winning the elections in 1990 were very favorable. Under these circumstances, and under the support of party deputies, Rafael Ángel Calderón announced his candidacy. Rodriguez decided to continue in the fight. As expected. Rafael Ángel Calderón Fournier won the candidacy for 76% of the votes cast.

In the elections of February 4, 1990, Calderón was elected president with 46.2% of the votes over his liberationist opponent Carlos Manuel Castillo. In this election, 29 deputies from the party were also elected, enough for a majority and a victory in all the country's provinces. The 1990 triumph confirmed the progress, already glimpsed in 1986, towards a bipartisan system. Thus, the party consolidated in the 1990s. For the 1994 election Miguel Ángel Rodríguez was launched as a presidential candidate unopposed, but he lost to PLN's candidate by a small margin of 1.8%. However, he won in the 1998 election. Rodriguez began to suffer from low popularity because of his association with neoliberal ideas, which unleashed strikes against the government. Despite this the figure of Dr. Abel Pacheco de la Espriella emerged, who with the charisma he had won for several years working on television, and due to his position as deputy of the Legislative Assembly of Costa Rica, was named presidential candidate for the 2002 election, winning and for the first time showing a PUSC consecutive victory.

Shaken by corruption scandals, even causing Calderón and Rodríguez to be arrested, prosecuted and in Calderón's case condemned, the unpopularity of the Pacheco administration and the resurgence of the new Citizens' Action Party the party suffered a terrible debacle and its candidate in 2006, Ricardo Toledo Carranza, obtained only 3% of the votes. After Calderón's conviction for corruption on October 5, 2009, he withdrew his presidential candidacy, being replaced by the then deputy of the party Luis Fishman Zonzinski, who obtained a low electoral support, again, of 3%.

The candidate endorsed by Calderonistas for the primary elections of the 2013 Social Christian Unity Party, Dr. Rodolfo Hernández Gómez, won the national convention with 77% of the votes over the liberal rival Rodolfo Piza. However, Hernández would resign his candidacy despite strong support in the polls after major disagreements with the party leadership, and Piza would assume the candidacy.

In 2015, Calderón and his followers left the party and founded the Social Christian Republican Party (an allusion to Calderón's father's historical party). Nevertheless, PUSC saw a victory in the 2016 municipal election, gaining second place in municipal votes, surpassing ruling PAC and receiving much more votes than Calderón's new party. PUSC obtained 15 mayors (second in number after PLN) and saw an increase in its electoral support, unlike PLN that although the more voted party did saw a decrease in support.

In 2018, both Piza and Hernández were nominees but from different parties; Piza from PUSC and Hernández from PRSC, attaining fourth and sixth place respectively and both supported opposite candidates in the second round. Piza would support PAC's candidate Carlos Alvarado Quesada who won the election in the second round and would take the office of prime minister during Alvarado's first year of tenure.

== Ideology ==
As a Christian socialist movement, Calderonism paradoxically was supported by both the Catholic Church and Costa Rican Communists. The defining feature of Calderonism was its "tripartite allegiance of the Church, communists, and republicans". Calderonism promoted far-reaching social and welfare policies; Calderón implemented social guarantees in the constitution, including rights for workers, universal healthcare and an expansive pension system. Calderonism is also credited with ending the oligarchic rule of the coffee barons and other socioeconomic elite in Costa Rica.

Timothy Adam Golob described Calderón as a "Catholic, Communist-associated leader" that unleashed "a new wave of social programs and progress, such as social security, labor laws, Constitutional amendments, social guarantees, civil rights, confiscating lands, and hurting the coffee barons through teaming up with the Catholic Church and the Communist Party". Calderón's welfare state was further expanded by his establishment of the University of Costa Rica.

Calderonism is described as populist; it gained the loyalty of the working class while disempowering the old political elite of Costa Rica, especially the once dominant big coffee growers. Calderón's Labor Code was described as "very favorable to unions". Calderonism as represented by Calderón is described as either centre-left or left-wing. Apart from greatly favouring trade unions, Calderonism also heavily encouraged the formation of worker cooperatives and included provisions that gave them special rights. Calderón also argued that his political doctrine was based on ensuring the "material dignity" of the workers, and denounced the banks and financial industry of Costa Rica.

=== Catholicism ===
Its socialist and communist elements notwithstanding, the core part of Calderonism was social Catholicism. Calderón recognized social Catholicism and the papal encyclicals of Pope Leo XIII and Pope Pius XI as the pivotal element of his doctrine, and present his economic reforms as both a social and spiritual transformation of Costa Rica. He stated that he found in "the Catholic Church’s doctrines the foundations, boost and will of justice that were missing in this materialist world dominated by a tough and cruel dominion of the strongest over the weakest, of economic slavery established by some human being upon big multitudes of humans, and of brutality and tyranny of those who have power". Calderón advocated state intervention in solving the social question and believed in a state that would guarantee protection of the citizens’ right to have employment, social security, decent working conditions and the opportunity to get higher education. He proposed establishing a new regime that was to be based on social justice.

Calderonism is considered to be "a socially oriented and activist Catholicism". Political scientists Juliana Martínez Franzoni and Diego Sánchez-Ancochea described Calderón as a "formidable politician with progressive ideas" that "went well beyond traditional Catholic ideas of social provision". Calderonism ultimately represented an alliance of Calderón with the Catholic Church and the communist Popular Vanguard Party. Pro-Calderón clergy supported this alliance, with Archbishop Víctor Manuel Sanabria Martínez writing: "The Rerum Novarum [is not] anti-socialist, anti-communist, anti-red. [It is] pro–social justice, pro-workers, pro–social obligations." Calderonism defended its alliance with communists by arguing that it is embracing comunismo a la tica — "Costa Rican communism", an indigenous, national part of the Costa Rican culture and politics, which it differentiated from international communism. This term was first coined by Mora: "We Costa Ricans need what we can call a Costa Rican communism: that is a Communist Party that can interpret the national reality and adjust their slogans and methods of struggle to this reality. From now on our goal will be to build a 'comunismo a la tica' in that sense." Calderonism is therefore regarded as "communistic", or "socialist, albeit criollo socialist".

=== Alliance with communists ===
Calderón sought to present himself as a populist caudillo and made his doctrine a personalistic one. He argued how while staying "in Belgium he remembered social injustice and identified himself with the Costa Rican poor’s suffering"; there, to adhere to the principles of the Catholic option for the poor, Calderón contended that he "set aside his bourgeoisie origin to present himself as classless and to align himself with the experiences of the poor". He presented his reforms as a way "to redeem the national proletariat" and to reform the "economic, moral, and cultural levels of the working class". However, despite the dominating Catholic element of Calderonism, the Calderonist social policies were based on the demands of Costa Rican communists, and Calderón "directly consulted with, or was pressured by, any labor groups, including the communist". David Gustavo Díaz-Arias notes that Calderonist policies "basically represented the PCCR’s Minimum Program". This led the Costa Rican communists to avoid criticizing Calderonism and eventually move to support it.

Calderonism was also fiercely anti-liberal, and Calderón regarded liberalism as a failure to address social issues. He formulated three "cardinal sins" of Costa Rican liberalism, which were "banking absolutism" defined as "absolute control of the riches produced by waged men under a semi-colonial regime", "control of political power to stop any proletarian’s redemptive and vindicated movement; and to hold onto an excessive protection of the capitalist industries", and lastly "control of the State which is used for the benefit of the rich ones in order to increase their profits, avoid taxes, keep interests, and negotiate with the Department of the Treasury". According to Calderón, under liberalism "the needs of the subaltern classes were forgotten as they were overexploited in their jobs and their right to participate of the national wealth was negated" and "they were defrauded and despoiled of their capacity to shop in an attempt to favor capitalist and export industries". Calderonism attacked capitalism as a system that was "the rejection of Costa Rican democracy: [a choice] to die of starvation or to accept the painful and degraded ways of work implanted by owners."

During Calderon's presidency, Calderonism grew increasingly sympathetic to communism, and Costa Rican communists likewise hailed the "progressive orientation" of Calderonism and came to support it as a "pro-working class legal transformation". By 1942, Manuel Mora, the leader of the communist PCCR, openly supported Calderonism and asked the Costa Rican workers to rally around its reforms:

These policies give the Costa Rican pueblo a series of possibilities in their struggle; it is urgent to launch a national campaign around these policies. It is urgent that labor organizations give their enthusiasm to the approval of these policies. If the Costa Rican pueblo is not able to mobilize around these policies, these policies are going to fail, and if those policies fail, then Costa Rica’s labor movement will be set back by several years.

=== Alliance with the Catholic Church ===
Despite openly working with communists, Calderón was also supported by the Catholic Church, and he "did not let down the Church". Calderonism was marked by pro-clericalism, as it re-established religious classes in middle school studies and reintroduced religion as a mandatory course in primary schools, reverting a liberal prohibition of it from the 19th century. This also provided Calderón with political legitimacy — he selectively deflected attacks of being a communist by bringing up his Catholic legislation and support of the clergy, and deflected attacks of being a conservative by highlighting the communist support for his rule. Reflecting papal encylicals, Calderonist clergy regarded wages as a "thermometer of social justice" and argued that state intervention in the economy and guarantee of salary regulation and distribution of jobs was mandatory and legitimized by the Catholic Church's encyclicals. On the Catholic Church, Calderón stated:

The Costa Rican Catholic Church and the government should work in harmony. I will put all my efforts into achieving this goal, because I am convinced of the positive influence that religious teachings has on cultural progress and in raising the ethical standards of our people. My administration will make sure the Catholic Church has no impediments in pursuing their noble duties.

=== Calderocomunismo ===
By 1942, open alliance of Calderón with the Costa Rican communists led to a construction of Calderocomunismo (Calderonist communism), which started as a derogatory term used by conservative critics of Calderón that was then appropriated by Calderonists as a positive term. Calderocomunismo represents the left-wing radicalization of Calderonism that took place 1942 onwards — Calderon, while staying true to his social Catholicism and pro-Catholic policies, intensified his economic rhetoric. He proposed to solve the problem of landless peasants in Costa Rica by seizing "fincas grandes" (large plantations) and distribute them to the poor. Moreover, he revealed a project to provide poor peasant with financial support as well as state-hired technicians that would ensure the productivity and stability of their newly acquired land. Calderón also reiterated his support for the Costa Rican trade unions and their demands. Along with the communist PCCR, Calderón invited a peasant, union leader and a parish priest to a meeting to represent the national alliance that Calderonism signified.

As Calderón denounced the "blind and selfish capitalists" of Costa Rica, opponents of his regime came to argue that he was becoming communist and that his social reforms were just a tactic to gain support to pursue communist legislation. Calderón continued to combat the accusations by bringing up his Catholicism, but his open cooperation and meetings with communist leaders intensified the attacks. This resulted in Calderón reaching an agreement with the PCCR to dissolve itself and reform into Partido Vanguardia Popular (Popular Vanguard Party, PVP). The PVP adopted a Calderonist program that while maintaining communist orientation, infused its program with nationalist and Catholic elements, claiming to be an "authentic Costa Rican party" and to be respectful of the Costa Rican Catholic culture and tradition. Calderonist Archbishop Víctor Manuel Sanabria Martínez endorsed the new party, arguing that it did not contradict the "fundamental doctrines of the Catholic consciousness", and stating that Catholics could be members of the new party. Calderocomunismo became an official political identity of the PVP and Costa Rican trade unions, which praised Calderón's reforms for greatly diminishing the influence of the wealthy and foreign companies on the economy.

=== Calderonism under Fournier ===
In the 1990 Costa Rican general election, Rafael Ángel Calderón Fournier, son of Calderón Guardia, was elected President running as the candidate of the Social Christian Unity Party. Fournier run on a populist message, identifying himself with his father and gaining the supporting of the poor with his promises for agricultural programs, including free food and housing for the rural poor. However, Fournier and his party represented many conservative views of the national business elite, such as opposing state intervention of the economy. Unlike his father, he pursued a completely different political course — he pursued neoliberal policies, abolishing protectionist legislation and privatizing the Costa Rican banks and state agencies. This made Costa Rica economically reliant on tourism. Fournier also cut educational and housing expenses, and his policies are considered to have increased wealth inequality in Costa Rica, particularly because of minimum wage cuts and regressive sales tax. Because of this, Fournier is considered to be a centre-right conservative with little connection to Calderonist policies.

== See also ==
- Camilism
- Chavismo
- Fidelismo
- Figuerism
- Peronism
