= 1982 Costa Rican general election =

- 7 February 1982
- Presidential election
- Registered: 1,261,127
- Turnout: 78.63% (▼2.64pp)
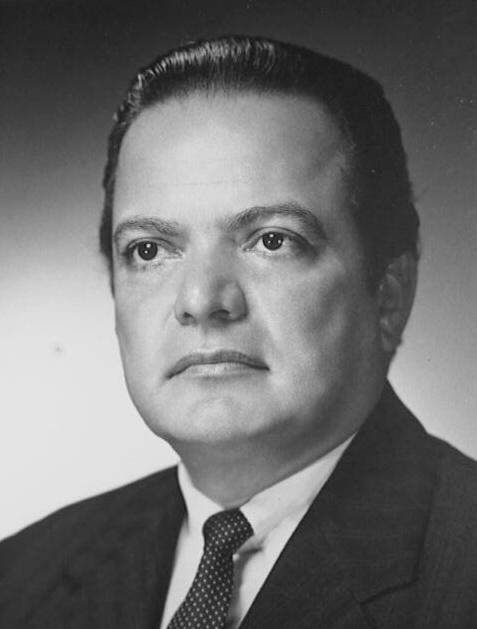

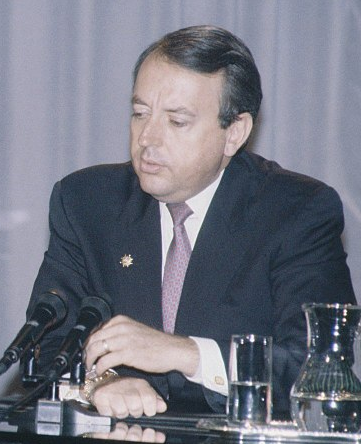
Nominee	Luis Alberto Monge	Rafael Ángel Calderón
Party	PLN	CU
Running mate	Alberto Fait; Armando Aráuz	Luis Chacón; José Muñoz
Popular vote	568,374	325,187
Percentage	58.80%	33.64%
- Results by district Monge: 40–50% 50–60% 60–70% 70-80% 80-90% 90-100% Calderón: 40-50% 50-60% Tie: 40-50%
President before election
Rodrigo Carazo
CU
Elected President
Luis Alberto Monge
PLN
- Legislative election
- All 57 seats in the Legislative Assembly; 29 seats needed for a majority
- Turnout: 78.63% (▼2.57pp)
Party	Leader	Vote %	Seats	+/–
PLN	Luis Alberto Monge	55.15	33	+8
CU	Rafael Ángel Calderón Fournier	29.08	18	−9
PU	Rodrigo Gutiérrez Sáenz	6.43	4	+1
MN	Mario Echandi Jiménez	3.60	1	New
PADA	Óscar Valverde Rodríguez	1.31	1	New
This lists parties that won seats. See the complete results below.
Results by province

General elections were held in Costa Rica on 7 February 1982. Luis Alberto Monge of the National Liberation Party won the presidential election, whilst his party also won the parliamentary election. Voter turnout was 79%.

Affected by a deep economic crisis and tensions with Somoza's Nicaragua due to Rodrigo Carazo's support of the FSLN, Carazo's government suffered from extremely low popularity. This naturally affected the Unity Coalition (Carazo's alliance) and its candidate Rafael Ángel Calderón Fournier giving to PLN and its candidate, trade union leader and farmer Luis Alberto Monge, a landslide victory and the party's biggest parliamentary group in its history (33 deputies). Nevertheless, Unity remained as the second most voted force in the election as Calderón was able to attract the traditional and very loyal Calderonista vote. The crisis was also beneficial for the left as it achieved a historical high voting and four seats in Parliament (the biggest group since 1948) with Dr. Rodrigo Gutiérrez repeating his candidacy from United People. Another candidate was former president Mario Echandi by the conservative and anti-communist National Movement, but Echandi's candidacy was testimonial, receiving almost as many votes as Gutierrez (3% each), according to some due to his incapacity to understand modern times when personal wealth and family origin was not enough to win an election.

== Results ==
=== President ===
Candidate	Party	Votes	%
Luis Alberto Monge	National Liberation Party	568,374	58.80
Rafael Ángel Calderón Fournier	Unity Coalition	325,187	33.64
Mario Echandi Jiménez	National Movement	37,127	3.84
Rodrigo Alberto Gutiérrez Sáenz	United People	32,186	3.33
Edwin Chacón Madrigal	Independent Party	1,955	0.20
Edwin Retana Chaves	Democratic Party	1,747	0.18
Total		966,576	100.00
Valid votes		966,576	97.47
Invalid votes		20,241	2.04
Blank votes		4,862	0.49
Total votes		991,679	100.00
Registered voters/turnout		1,261,127	78.63
Source: Election Resources

==== By province ====
Province	Monge %	Calderón %	Echandi %	Gutiérrez %	Chacón %	Retana %
San José	58.4	32.5	5.3	3.5	0.2	0.1
Alajuela	59.5	35.5	2.8	2.0	0.2	0.2
Cartago	61.9	32.8	2.7	2.1	0.3	0.2
Heredia	57.0	36.3	2.6	3.7	0.1	0.2
Puntarenas	58.3	32.8	3.3	5.0	0.3	0.3
Limón	53.9	33.8	3.6	7.8	0.6	0.4
Guanacaste	60.7	34.6	2.4	1.8	0.2	0.2
Total	58.8	33.6	3.8	3.3	0.2	0.2

=== Legislative Assembly ===
Party	Votes	%	Seats	+/–
National Liberation Party	527,231	55.15	33	+8
Unity Coalition	277,998	29.08	18	–9
United People	61,465	6.43	4	+1
National Movement	34,437	3.60	1	New
Alajuelense Democratic Action	12,486	1.31	1	New
National Democratic Party	11,575	1.21	0	New
Cartago Agrarian Union Party	7,235	0.76	0	–1
Costa Rican Concord Party	5,014	0.52	0	0
Independent Party	4,671	0.49	0	0
Authentic Limonense Party	3,893	0.41	0	0
Peoples' Action Party	3,546	0.37	0	New
Democratic Party	2,672	0.28	0	0
Cartago Parliamentary Union Party	1,047	0.11	0	New
Authentic Puntarenense Party	1,036	0.11	0	0
Worker-Peasant Party	976	0.10	0	New
National Liberal Progressive Republican Party	708	0.07	0	New
Total	955,990	100.00	57	0
Valid votes	955,990	96.41		
Invalid votes	24,560	2.48		
Blank votes	11,016	1.11		
Total votes	991,566	100.00		
Registered voters/turnout	1,261,127	78.63		
Source: Election Resources

==== By province ====
Province	PLN		CU		PU		MN		PND		PI		PD		Others	
Province	%	S	%	S	%	S	%	S	%	S	%	S	%	S	%	S
San José	55.1	12	28.5	6	7.2	2	4.7	1	1.5	0	0.4	0	0.3	0	2.3	0
Alajuela	55.5	6	30.1	3	3.3	0	2.4	0	0.7	0	0.4	0	0.2	0	7.4	1
Cartago	57.2	4	25.5	2	3.8	0	2.2	0	0.6	0	1.2	0	0.3	0	9.2	0
Heredia	54.0	3	32.4	2	8.3	0	3.5	0	1.1	0	0.4	0	0.2	0	-	-
Puntarenas	55.7	3	28.6	2	8.6	1	3.2	0	2.0	0	0.3	0	0.4	0	1.2	0
Limón	43.5	2	27.0	1	14.2	1	3.4	0	1.8	0	1.4	0	0.4	0	8.4	0
Guanacaste	59.4	3	32.8	2	3.9	0	3.1	0	0.6	0	-	-	0.2	-	-	-
Total	55.2	33	29.1	18	6.4	4	3.6	1	1.2	0	0.5	0	0.3	0	3.7	0

=== Local governments ===
Party	Votes	%	Seats			
Party	Votes	%	Alderpeople	+/–	Municipal syndics	+/–
National Liberation Party	535,478	55.91	299	+86	403	+226
Unity Coalition	287,825	30.05	164	–66	11	–217
United People	59,161	6.18	21	–2	0	0
National Movement	40,079	4.19	4	New	0	New
National Democratic Party	9,455	0.99	2	New	0	New
Alajuelense Democratic Action	9,359	0.98	2	New	0	New
Peoples' Action Party	4,762	0.50	0	New	0	New
Independent Party	3,514	0.37	0	–1	0	–1
General Union Party	1,852	0.19	1	New	0	New
Authentic Limonense Party	1,763	0.18	1	0	0	0
Worker-Peasant Party	1,463	0.15	1	0	0	0
New Alajuelita Party	1,073	0.11	1	New	0	New
Authentic Puntarenense Party	722	0.08	0	–1	0	0
Cartago Agrarian Union Party	695	0.07	0	New	0	New
Democratic Party	475	0.05	0	0	0	0
Total	957,676	100.00	496	+19	414	+8
Valid votes	957,676	96.58				
Invalid/blank votes	33,869	3.42				
Total votes	991,545	100.00				
Registered voters/turnout	1,269,676	78.09				
Source: TSE
