= Marco Vinicio Redondo Quirós =

Costa Rican politician

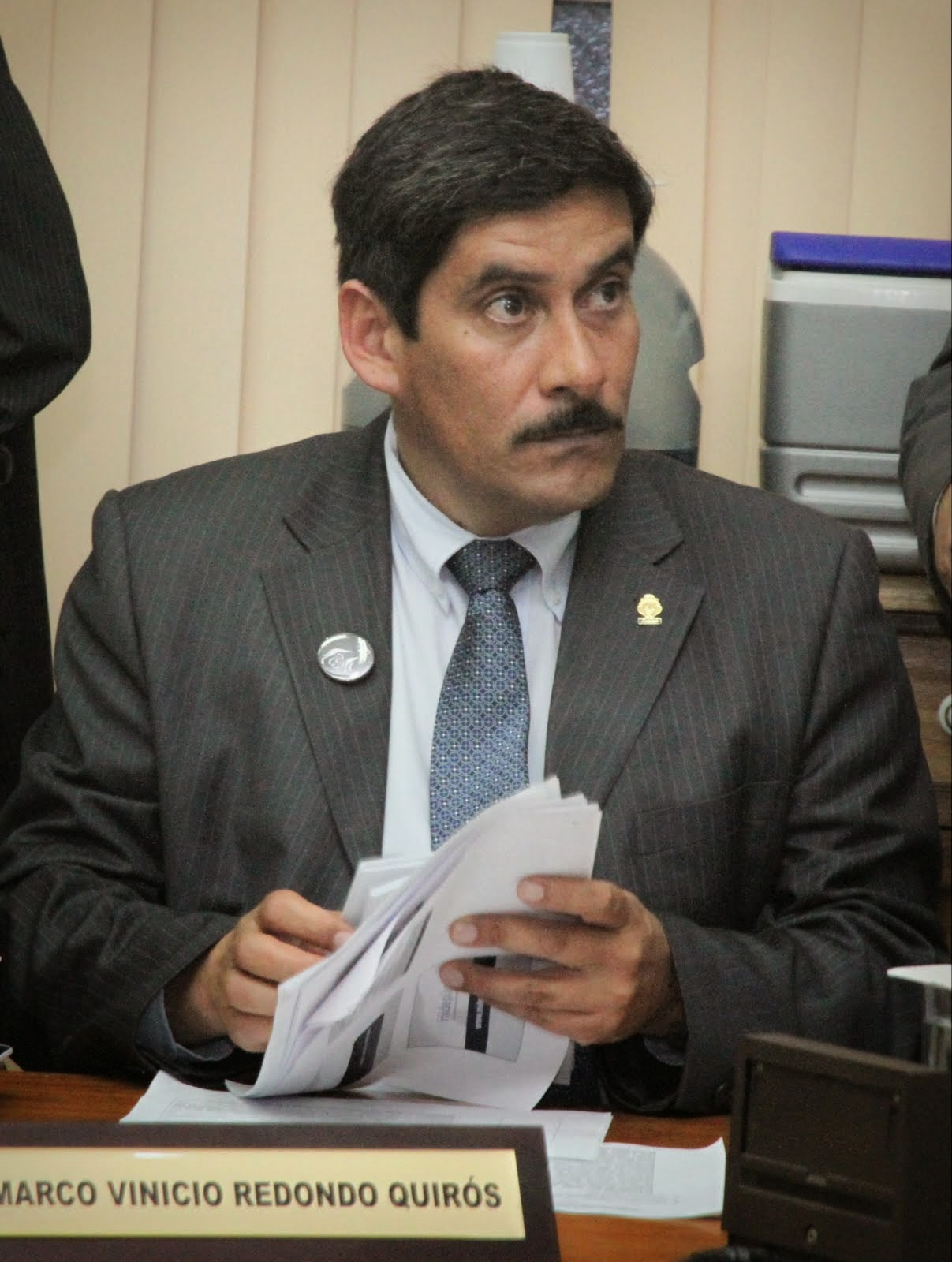
- Redondo Quirós in 2014

Deputy Legislative Assembly of Costa Rica
- In office 2014–2018
- Constituency: Cartago

Mayor, Oreamuno

Personal details
- Born: Costa Rica
- Party: Citizens' Action Party
- Profession: Politician

Marco Vinicio Redondo Quirós is a deputy from Cartago, serving in the Legislative Assembly of Costa Rica for the 2014-2018 legislative session.

Redondo has a bachelor's degree in business administration.

Redondo was Mayor of Oreamuno, a municipality in Cartago. He was investigated by the Organismo de Investigación Judicial (Judicial Investigation Unit) for an issue relating to Redondo's property. As of March 2014, the case was still being adjudicated. Officials from Redondo's party, the Citizens' Action Party (PAC for its Spanish initials), including Emilia Molina Cruz and Olivier Pérez González, said they were unaware of the case. defended Redondo, saying that he had high ethics and that he was being persecuted for his time as mayor of Oreamuno.

At the time of his election, Redondo was 47 years old. Redondo is a member of the Citizens' Action Party.
