= Social Christian Unity Party =

Political party in Costa Rica

Social Christian Unity Party Partido Unidad Social Cristiana
- Abbreviation: PUSC
- President: Teddy Zúñiga Sánchez
- Secretary-General: Ana Cristina Valdelomar
- Spokesperson: Abril Gordienko López
- Founder: Rafael Ángel Calderón Fournier
- Founded: 17 December 1983; 42 years ago
- Preceded by: Unity Coalition
- Headquarters: San Pedro, Montes de Oca
- Ideology: Christian democracy Liberal conservatism Historical: Calderonism; Christian socialism Social conservatism
- Political position: Centre-right; Historical: Left-wing
- Regional affiliation: Christian Democrat Organization of America; Union of Latin American Parties
- International affiliation: International Democracy Union
- Colours: Red; Blue
- Legislative Assembly: 1 / 57
- Mayors: 19 / 84
- Alderpeople: 115 / 518
- Syndics: 95 / 488
- District councillors: 375 / 1,952
- Intendants: 1 / 8

Party flag

Website
- www.unidad.cr

The Social Christian Unity Party (Spanish: Partido Unidad Social Cristiana, PUSC) is a Costa Rican centre-right political party. Founded in 1983, it traces its ideological origins to Calderonism, the political movement associated with the reforms of President Rafael Ángel Calderón Guardia and the National Republican Party, which governed from 1940 to 1948.

The PUSC was established through the merger of the 4 parties that had previously formed the Unity Coalition: the Christian Democratic Party, the Republican Calderonista Party, the People's Union Party, and the Democratic Renovation Party. It is a member of the Christian Democrat Organization of America (ODCA) and advocates a political platform based on Christian-democratic principles, including social solidarity, representative democracy, and a market economy tempered by social responsibility.

From its foundation until the early 2000s, the PUSC was one of Costa Rica's two dominant political parties, alongside the National Liberation Party (PLN), forming the core of the country's two-party system. During this period, the party won three presidential elections and provided three presidents: Rafael Ángel Calderón Fournier (1990–1994), Miguel Ángel Rodríguez Echeverría (1998–2002), and Abel Pacheco de la Espriella (2002–2006).

Although its electoral influence has declined since the mid 2000s amid a series of corruption scandals involving former party leaders, the PUSC has remained one of Costa Rica's principal political parties and continues to hold representation in the Legislative Assembly.

In Costa Rican political discourse, the party is commonly referred to simply as La Unidad ("The Unity"), while its supporters are known as socialcristianos ("social Christians") or, colloquially, as mariachis.

== History ==
Efforts to unite Costa Rica's principal opposition parties into a permanent political force capable of challenging the dominance of the National Liberation Party (PLN) began in the early 1970s. In 1977, four parties—the People's Union Party, the Christian Democratic Party, the Republican Calderonista Party, and the Democratic Renovation Party—formed the Unity Coalition (Coalición Unidad).

Following a primary election, former PLN deputy Rodrigo Carazo Odio was selected as the coalition's presidential candidate. In the 1978 general election, Carazo won the presidency with 50.1% of the vote. The coalition also achieved a strong legislative result, falling only two seats short of an absolute majority in the Legislative Assembly. For the first time since the 1953 election, the PLN failed to emerge as the largest parliamentary bloc.

Carazo's administration, however, faced significant challenges, including the severe economic crisis of 1978–1982 and regional tensions stemming from the Nicaraguan Revolution. As a result, public support for the coalition declined substantially. In the 1982 election, the coalition's candidate, Rafael Ángel Calderón Fournier, received 33.6% of the vote, while the PLN won a landslide victory. Despite the defeat, the coalition remained the country's second political force and retained 18 seats.

On 17 December 1983, the four coalition parties formally merged to create the Social Christian Unity Party (PUSC). The merger was prompted in part by electoral legislation requiring coalition members to unite as a single party in order to maintain legal registration and receive the "political debt" (state campaign financing). The process generated internal debate, particularly within the Democratic Renovation Party, whose national assembly approved the merger by a narrow margin. The creation of the PUSC marked the consolidation of Costa Rica's modern two-party system, with the PLN and PUSC emerging as the country's dominant political forces.

The PUSC held its first primary election on 27 February 1989. Calderón Fournier defeated Miguel Ángel Rodríguez Echeverría with approximately 75% of the vote and became the party's presidential nominee. As the son of former president Rafael Ángel Calderón Guardia, Calderón was widely regarded as the leading representative of the party's Calderonist tradition, while Rodríguez was associated with its more economically liberal wing. The rivalry between these factions remained an important feature of the party's internal politics for decades. In the 1990 election, Calderón defeated PLN candidate Carlos Manuel Castillo Morales and became president.

A second primary was held in 1993 between Rodríguez and Juan José Trejos Fonseca, son of former president José Joaquín Trejos Fernández. Rodríguez won the nomination by a wide margin but was defeated by José María Figueres Olsen of the PLN in the 1994 election. Rodríguez was nominated again for the 1998 election and won the presidency, while the PUSC also secured a majority in the Legislative Assembly. Unlike previous elections, his nomination was uncontested and did not require a primary election.

The party's next primary took place on 10 June 2001 and was contested by deputy and TV personality Abel Pacheco de la Espriella and former minister Rodolfo Méndez Mata. Although Méndez was endorsed by Calderón Fournier, Pacheco won the nomination with approximately 76% of the vote. He subsequently won the 2002 presidential election, defeating PLN candidate Rolando Araya Monge in the second round with 57.9% of the vote. Pacheco's victory marked the first time since 1948 that a political party other than the PLN had retained the presidency for two consecutive terms.

=== Corruption scandals (2004–2005) ===
Between 2004 and 2005, the Social Christian Unity Party faced a severe political crisis as a result of a series of corruption scandals involving former Costa Rican presidents Rafael Ángel Calderón Fournier, Miguel Ángel Rodríguez Echeverría, and José María Figueres Olsen (PLN). The allegations centered on payments allegedly received in connection with contracts between private companies and state institutions, most notably the Caja–Fischel and ICE–Alcatel cases.

In the Caja–Fischel case, Calderón was accused of receiving illicit payments related to contracts between the Costa Rican Social Security Fund (CCSS) and the medical equipment supplier Fischel. He was arrested and prosecuted, and in 2009 was convicted and sentenced to prison. However, the conviction was later annulled by the Supreme Court of Costa Rica, which ordered a new trial.

Rodríguez was implicated in the ICE–Alcatel case, which concerned allegations that officials had received payments in exchange for facilitating telecommunications contracts between the Costa Rican Electricity Institute (ICE) and the French company Alcatel. After resigning as Secretary General of the Organization of American States, Rodríguez returned to Costa Rica, where he was publicly arrested upon arrival at Juan Santamaría International Airport, exposed to the press, and later placed under investigation. He was convicted in 2011, but the sentence was overturned by an appeals court in 2012, which acquitted him of all charges. Figueres was also investigated in connection with payments received from Alcatel after leaving office. Unlike Calderón and Rodríguez, he was not arrested, as he resided outside Costa Rica during much of the investigation. Prosecutors ultimately closed the case against him after the applicable statute of limitations expired.

Rodríguez was also investigated in a separate case known as the Caso Reaseguros ("Reinsurance Case") for alleged embezzlement. Prosecutors alleged that he and former officials of the ICE and the National Insurance Institute (INS) had received payments from British reinsurance companies in connection with contracts awarded during his administration. The investigation focused on alleged transfers made through companies linked to Rodríguez and other defendants. Rodríguez repeatedly denied the accusations over the years, describing them as politically motivated. After 25 years of judicial proceedings, a court deemed him innocent of all charges in May 2026.

The scandals significantly damaged the public image of the PUSC and contributed to the collapse of Costa Rica's traditional two-party system. In the years that followed, the party experienced a sharp decline in electoral support and lost much of the political dominance it had shared with the National Liberation Party since the 1980s.

=== Results after the scandals ===
The corruption scandals of 2004–2005 had a profound impact on the Social Christian Unity Party's electoral fortunes. In the 2006 general election, the party nominated Ricardo Toledo Carranza, who had served as Minister of the Presidency under Abel Pacheco. Toledo received only 3.6% of the presidential vote, a dramatic decline for a party that had governed the country only months earlier. Meanwhile, the Citizens' Action Party (PAC) emerged as the principal challenger to the National Liberation Party, effectively replacing the PUSC as the country's main opposition force. The PUSC's legislative representation fell from 17 seats to 5 in the Legislative Assembly, while its local representation declined from 58 mayors to 9 in that year's municipal election.

In the 2010 election, the party nominated former vice president Luis Fishman Zonzinski, the first Jewish presidential candidate in Costa Rican history. Fishman received 3.9% of the presidential vote, while the PUSC won 8.2% of the legislative vote and retained its five seats in the Legislative Assembly.

Ahead of the 2014 election, former president Rafael Ángel Calderón Fournier promoted Rodolfo Hernández Gómez, then director of the National Children's Hospital, as the party's presidential candidate. Hernández defeated Rodolfo Piza Rocafort, a former head of the Costa Rican Social Security Fund (CCSS) in the administration of Miguel Ángel Rodríguez, in the party's 2013 primary election with approximately 75% of the vote. During the early stages of the campaign, Hernández polled strongly and was at times considered one of the leading contenders. However, he withdrew his candidacy in October 2013, citing internal disagreements within the party leadership. The nomination subsequently passed to Piza. Piza finished fifth in the presidential election with approximately 6% of the vote. Nevertheless, the PUSC improved its legislative performance, increasing its representation from five to eight seats and surpassing the Libertarian Movement to become the fourth-largest party in the Legislative Assembly.

In 2015, Calderón and several of his supporters left the PUSC and founded the Social Christian Republican Party, reviving the historical republican tradition associated with Calderonism. Despite the split, the PUSC performed strongly in the 2016 municipal elections, finishing second in the nationwide municipal vote, ahead of the governing PAC. The party won 15 mayoralties, the second-highest total after the PLN.

In October 2016, the PUSC adopted a position supporting equal legal rights for same-sex couples in areas such as inheritance, social security benefits, and property rights, while continuing to oppose the legalization of same-sex marriage.

For the 2018 general election, the party again nominated Rodolfo Piza. He achieved the party's strongest presidential result since 2002, receiving 15.99% of the vote and finishing fourth. The PUSC also increased its legislative representation from eight to nine seats. In 2022, the party nominated former vice president Lineth Saborío Chaverri, who finished fifth in the presidential race with 12.40%. The PUSC maintained its nine seats in the Legislative Assembly.

For the 2026 election, the party nominated former chairman and Cato Institute analyst Juan Carlos Hidalgo Bogantes. The election resulted in a severe setback for the PUSC, which received only 2.66% of the presidential vote and was reduced to a single legislative seat, the poorest electoral performance in the party's history.

== Electoral performance ==
=== Presidential ===
Election	Candidate	First round				Second round			
Election	Candidate	Votes	%	Position	Result	Votes	%	Position	Result
1986	Rafael Ángel Calderón	542,434	45.77%	2nd	Lost	—N/a			
1990	Rafael Ángel Calderón	694,589	51.51%	▲1st	Won	—N/a			
1994	Miguel Ángel Rodríguez	711,328	47.74%	▼2nd	Lost	—N/a			
1998	Miguel Ángel Rodríguez	652,160	46.96%	▲1st	Won	—N/a			
2002	Abel Pacheco	590,277	38.58%	1st	–	776,278	57.95	1st	Won
2006	Ricardo Toledo Carranza	57,655	3.55%	▼4th	Lost	—N/a			
2010	Luis Fishman Zonzinski	71,330	3.86%	4th	Lost	—N/a			
2014	Rodolfo Piza Rocafort	123,653	6.02%	▼5th	Lost	—N/a			
2018	Rodolfo Piza Rocafort	344,595	15.99%	▲4th	Lost	—N/a			
2022	Lineth Saborío Chaverri	259,767	12.40%	▼5th	Lost	—N/a			
2026	Juan Carlos Hidalgo	68,188	2.66%	5th	Lost	—N/a			

=== Parliamentary ===
Election	Leader	Votes	%	Seats	+/–	Position	Government
1986	Rafael Ángel Calderón	485,860	41.4%	25 / 57	New	2nd	Opposition
1990	Rafael Ángel Calderón	617,478	46.2%	29 / 57	▲4	▲1st	Government
1994	Miguel Ángel Rodríguez	595,802	40.4%	25 / 57	▼4	▼2nd	Opposition
1998	Miguel Ángel Rodríguez	569,792	41.2%	27 / 57	▲2	▲1st	Government
2002	Abel Pacheco	453,201	29.8%	19 / 57	▼8	1st	Government
2006	Ricardo Toledo Carranza	126,284	7.8%	5 / 57	▼14	▼4th	Opposition
2010	Luis Fishman Zonzinski	155,047	8.2%	6 / 57	▲1	4th	Opposition
2014	Rodolfo Piza Rocafort	205,247	10.1%	8 / 57	▲2	4th	Crossbench
2018	Rodolfo Piza Rocafort	312,097	14.6%	9 / 57	▲1	4th	Opposition
2022	Lineth Saborío Chaverri	236,941	11.4%	9 / 57	0	▲3rd	Opposition
2026	Juan Carlos Hidalgo	115,135	4.52%	1 / 57	▼8	▼5th	Opposition
