= Fernando Guzmán Mata =

Costa Rican politician (1921–1993)

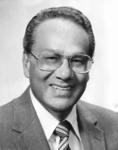

Second Vice President of Costa Rica
- In office 8 May 1974 – 8 May 1978 Serving with Carlos Manuel Castillo Morales
- President: Daniel Oduber Quirós
- Preceded by: Jorge Rossi Chavarría
- Succeeded by: José Miguel Alfaro Rodríguez

Deputy of the Legislative Assembly of Costa Rica
- In office 1 May 1982 – 30 April 1986
- Preceded by: Ángel Solano Calderón
- Succeeded by: Jorge Rossi Chavarría
- Constituency: Cartago (1st Office)
- In office 1 May 1966 – 30 April 1970
- Preceded by: Joaquín Garro Jiménez
- Succeeded by: Eladio Alonso Andrés
- Constituency: Cartago (1st Office)
- In office 1 May 1958 – 30 April 1962
- Preceded by: Francisco Bonilla Wepold
- Succeeded by: Minor Calvo Ortega
- Constituency: Cartago (3rd Office)

Personal details
- Born: Fernando Antonio de Jesús Guzmán Mata; 29 November 1921 Cartago, Costa Rica
- Died: 26 October 1993 (aged 71) Cartago, Costa Rica
- Party: PLN
- Spouse: Marta Ovares Salazar (m. 1949)
- Children: 8
- Education: University of Costa Rica (BPharm); National Autonomous University of Mexico (MBBS)
- Occupation: Physician; surgeon; politician

Fernando Antonio de Jesús Guzmán Mata (29 November 1921 – 26 October 1993) was a Costa Rican physician and politician who served as Second Vice President of Costa Rica from 1974 to 1978. A member of the National Liberation Party, he previously served as a deputy in the Legislative Assembly from 1966 to 1970.

Alongside Jorge Luis Villanueva Badilla he created the Costa Rica Institute of Technology.
