= Mario Redondo Poveda =

Costa Rican lawyer and politician (born 1962)

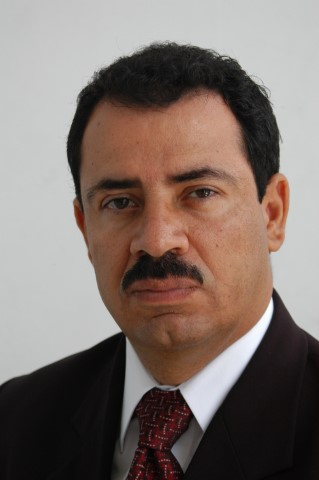
- Official portrait, 2014

Mayor of Cartago
- Incumbent
- Assumed office 1 May 2020
- Preceded by: Rolando Rodríguez Brenes

President of the Christian Democratic Alliance
- In office 9 November 2012 – 25 September 2023
- Preceded by: Party established
- Succeeded by: Party suspended

45th President of the Legislative Assembly of Costa Rica
- In office 1 May 2003 – 30 April 2004
- Preceded by: Rolando Laclé Castro
- Succeeded by: Gerardo González Esquivel

Deputy of the Legislative Assembly of Costa Rica
- In office 1 May 2014 – 30 April 2018
- Preceded by: José Roberto Rodríguez Quesada
- Succeeded by: Sylvia Patricia Villegas Álvarez
- Constituency: Cartago (7th Office)
- In office 1 May 2002 – 30 April 2006
- Preceded by: Rafael Ángel Villalta Loaiza
- Succeeded by: Clara Zomer Rezler
- Constituency: Cartago (1st Office)

Personal details
- Born: Mario Gerardo Redondo Poveda; 26 October 1962 (age 63) Cartago, Costa Rica
- Party: ADC (2012–2023)
- Other political affiliations: PUSC (1983–2003)
- Education: Autonomous University of Central America (LLB)

Mario Gerardo Redondo Poveda (born 26 October 1962) is a Costa Rican lawyer and politician who has served as Mayor of Cartago since 2020. He previously served as the 45th President of the Legislative Assembly from 2003 to 2004.

== Biography ==
Redondo was born on 26 October 1962 in Cartago, Costa Rica. He attended Ascensión Esquivel School and San Luis Gonzaga High School in Cartago. He studied law at the Autonomous University of Central America, where he obtained a law degree.

Redondo has worked as a consultant for the United Nations Development Programme, the Organization of American States, the German Corporation for International Cooperation, the Central American Bank for Economic Integration, and the Costa Rican Chamber of Construction.

Redondo began his political career with the Social Christian Unity Party (PUSC). He served on the Cartago Municipal Council and subsequently held positions within the PUSC's legislative organization. He was elected to the Legislative Assembly for the 2002–2006 legislative term as a PUSC representative. He served as president of the Legislative Assembly from 2003 to 2004 and as head of the PUSC legislative caucus from 2002 to 2003. During his tenure in the Assembly, he chaired the Special Commission on the Reform of the General Customs Law and the Special Joint Commission on the Fiscal Pact. He also served on the Second Commission with Full Legislative Powers and the Legal Affairs Commission.

Redondo later founded the Christian Democratic Alliance, which nominated him as its presidential candidate in 2014 and 2018. He represented the party in the Legislative Assembly during the 2014–2018 term.

During that legislative term, Redondo opposed several policies and proposals of the administration of President Luis Guillermo Solís. He was associated with a group of legislators described in contemporary reporting as the "Christian Bloc", which opposed proposals concerning in vitro fertilization, abortion regulations, emergency contraception, the secularization of the state, and the legal recognition of same-sex unions.

In the 2020 municipal elections, Redondo was elected mayor of the canton of Cartago as a candidate of the Christian Democratic Alliance. He was re-elected in the 2024 elections, this time as the candidate supported by the provincial party Actuemos Ya, as the ADC had been unable to renew its internal structures and leadership. The ADC was ultimately declared inactive by the Supreme Electoral Court on 7 January 2025.

Redondo has held positions on several educational, community, and civic organizations. He has served as president of the board of the Julia Salazar Kindergarten and the Jesús Jiménez School, and as vice president of the Mario Sancho Library Board. He has also been a member of the Cartago Province Security Commission and the Jireh Housing Association. He has participated in initiatives related to the establishment and construction of the Taras, Dulce Nombre, and San Diego secondary schools.
