= 1986 Costa Rican general election =

- 2 February 1986
- Presidential election
- Registered: 1,486,474
- Turnout: 81.82% (▲3.19pp)
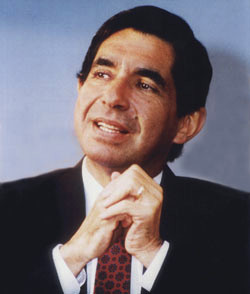

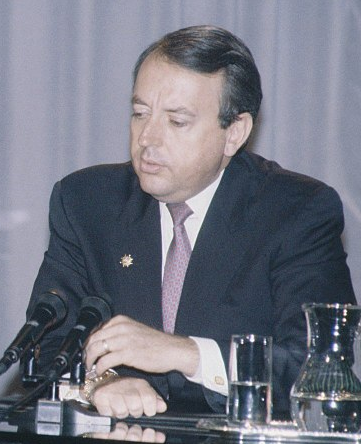
Nominee	Óscar Arias	Rafael Ángel Calderón
Party	PLN	PUSC
Running mate	Jorge Manuel Dengo; Victoria Garrón	Ramón Aguilar; Jaime Gutiérrez
Popular vote	620,314	542,434
Percentage	52.34%	45.77%
- Results by district Arias: 40–50% 50–60% 60–70% 70-80% 80-90% 90-100% Calderón: 40–50% 50–60% 60–70% Tie: 40–50%
President before election
Luis Alberto Monge
PLN
Elected President
Óscar Arias
PLN
- Legislative election
- All 57 seats in the Legislative Assembly; 29 seats needed for a majority
- Turnout: 81.81% (▲3.18pp)
Party	Leader	Vote %	Seats	+/–
PLN	Óscar Arias	47.83	29	−4
PUSC	Rafael Ángel Calderón	41.45	25	+7
PU	Rodrigo Gutiérrez Sáenz	2.70	1	−3
AP	Álvaro Montero Mejía	2.40	1	New
PUAC	Juan Guillermo Brenes	1.16	1	+1
This lists parties that won seats. See the complete results below.
Results by province

General elections were held in Costa Rica on 2 February 1986. Óscar Arias of the National Liberation Party won the presidential election, whilst his party also won the parliamentary election. Voter turnout was 82%.

Costa Rica was under a strong two-party system at the time. The country was undergoing military tensions with neighboring Nicaragua due to the recently occurring Sandinista Revolution and Nicaragua's dictator Daniel Ortega's fighting of the right-wing Nicaraguan Contras in its southern border, disregarding the official limits and confronting Costa Rica's police and security forces. Such skirmishes left one policeman dead and several wounded and both countries at the edge of war. Whilst some people blamed former president Rodrigo Carazo for allowing the FSLN to operate in the Costa Rican northern territory against then dictator Anastasio Somoza, others resented President Luis Alberto Monge's hawkish behavior toward Sandinista Nicaragua and his support of the Contras.

Former minister and deputy Óscar Arias faced former vice president Carlos Manuel Castillo in closed primaries. Castillo had the support of the PLN's traditional leadership including former presidents and party's founders José Figueres Ferrer, Daniel Oduber Quirós and Luis Alberto Monge. Arias was seen as a young, alternative candidate and the "underdog" in the election, but managed to earn the majority of votes and popular support.

On the other side of the two-party system former Foreign Minister (under Carazo's administration) Rafael Ángel Calderón Fournier, son of historical leader of Calderonismo Rafael Ángel Calderón Guardia, was nominated by the Social Christian Unity Party, then the main opposition force. This was Calderón's second attempt to win the Presidency.

During the campaign the topic of peace was central. Calderón tried to present himself as a hawk who felt no quarrels in facing Nicaragua militarily. Arias on the contrary tried to show himself as a man of peace and negotiator who would pacify the region. His slogan was "Paz para mi gente" (Peace for my People). In fact, some analysts also saw Arias' position as a strong criticism of Monge, of his own party, and his hardline position. Monge and Arias would be political enemies ever since.

PLN campaign also focused in showing Calderón as a man of war and remembering old historical periods, blaming Calderonism for the 1948 Civil War and the 1955 Somoza-endorsed Calderonistas' invasion attempt. The party even went so far as to show Calderón in a cartoon as a spoiled kid ready for war wearing the clothing of Quico, a popular character from El Chavo del Ocho.

== Results ==
=== President ===
Candidate	Party	Votes	%
Óscar Arias Sánchez	National Liberation Party	620,314	52.34
Rafael Ángel Calderón Fournier	Social Christian Unity Party	542,434	45.77
Rodrigo Gutiérrez Sáenz	People's Alliance	9,099	0.77
Álvaro Montero Mejía	United People	6,599	0.56
Alejandro Madrigal Benavides	Christian National Alliance Party	5,647	0.48
Eugenio Jiménez Sancho	Independent Party	1,129	0.10
Total		1,185,222	100.00
Valid votes		1,185,222	97.44
Invalid votes		26,029	2.14
Blank votes		5,049	0.42
Total votes		1,216,300	100.00
Registered voters/turnout		1,486,474	81.82
Source: Election Resources

The People's Alliance was a coalition of the People's Vanguard Party and the Broad Democratic Front.

==== By province ====
Province	Arias %	Calderón %	Gutiérrez %	Montero %	Madrigal %	Jiménez %
San José	54.2	43.8	0.8	0.6	0.5	0.1
Alajuela	53.0	45.8	0.5	0.4	0.3	0.1
Cartago	54.1	44.3	0.5	0.4	0.5	0.1
Heredia	52.8	45.2	0.8	0.6	0.5	0.1
Puntarenas	48.2	49.2	1.2	0.7	0.5	0.1
Limón	42.4	54.0	1.7	1.1	0.7	0.1
Guanacaste	50.1	48.7	0.3	0.5	0.3	0.1
Total	52.3	45.8	0.8	0.6	0.5	0.1

=== Legislative Assembly ===
Party	Votes	%	Seats	+/–
National Liberation Party	560,694	47.83	29	–4
Social Christian Unity Party	485,860	41.45	25	New
United People	31,685	2.70	1	–3
People's Alliance	28,551	2.44	1	New
Christian National Alliance Party	19,972	1.70	0	New
Cartago Agrarian Union Party	13,575	1.16	1	+1
Independent National Republican Party	10,598	0.90	0	New
General Union Party	4,402	0.38	0	New
Alajuelense Democratic Action	4,324	0.37	0	–1
Authentic Limonense Party	3,813	0.33	0	0
Alajuelense Solidarity Party	3,604	0.31	0	New
Independent Party	3,067	0.26	0	0
National Democratic Party	2,054	0.18	0	0
Total	1,172,199	100.00	57	0
Valid votes	1,172,199	96.39		
Invalid votes	30,667	2.52		
Blank votes	13,187	1.08		
Total votes	1,216,053	100.00		
Registered voters/turnout	1,486,474	81.81		
Source: Election Resources

==== By province ====
Province	PLN		PUSC		PU		AP		ANC		PRNI		PUG		Others	
Province	%	S	%	S	%	S	%	S	%	S	%	S	%	S	%	S
San José	49.5	10	40.3	9	3.4	1	2.9	1	1.9	0	0.8	0	0.6	0	0.6	0
Alajuela	49.9	5	42.0	5	1.2	0	1.3	0	1.1	0	0.6	0	0.1	0	3.9	0
Cartago	46.6	3	37.5	2	1.7	0	1.7	0	1.3	0	0.6	0	0.1	0	10.5	1
Heredia	48.3	3	42.1	2	4.1	0	2.5	0	2.1	0	0.8	0	0.1	0	-	-
Puntarenas	45.1	3	44.2	3	2.2	1	3.1	0	1.7	0	1.5	0	0.3	0	2.0	0
Limón	34.9	2	44.6	2	4.8	1	5.5	0	1.7	0	1.4	0	0.9	0	6.2	0
Guanacaste	47.6	3	45.6	2	1.4	0	0.8	0	2.5	0	1.7	0	0.3	0	-	-
Total	47.8	29	41.4	25	2.7	1	2.4	1	1.7	0	0.9	0	0.4	0	2.7	1

=== Local governments ===
Party	Votes	%	Seats			
Party	Votes	%	Alderpeople	+/–	Municipal syndics	+/–
National Liberation Party	580,460	49.36	260	–39	306	–97
Social Christian Unity Party	508,732	43.26	232	New	114	New
United People	33,026	2.81	3	–18	0	0
People's Alliance	29,551	2.51	2	New	0	New
Alajuelense Solidarity Party	5,502	0.47	1	New	0	New
Alajuelense Democratic Action	5,326	0.45	1	–1	0	0
General Union Party	4,327	0.37	2	+1	0	0
Independent National Republican Party	3,143	0.27	0	New	0	New
Authentic Limonense Party	2,342	0.20	1	0	0	0
National Democratic Party	1,682	0.14	1	–1	0	0
New Alajuelita Party	1,246	0.11	1	0	0	0
Independent Party	726	0.06	0	0	0	0
Total	1,176,063	100.00	504	+9	420	+6
Valid votes	1,176,063	96.71				
Invalid/blank votes	39,988	3.29				
Total votes	1,216,051	100.00				
Registered voters/turnout	1,486,234	81.82				
Source: TSE
