= 1978 Costa Rican general election =

- 5 February 1978
- Presidential election
- Registered: 1,058,455
- Turnout: 81.27% (▲1.35pp)
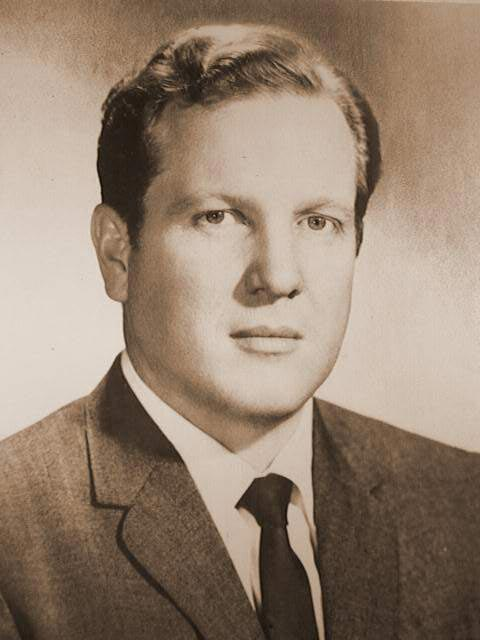

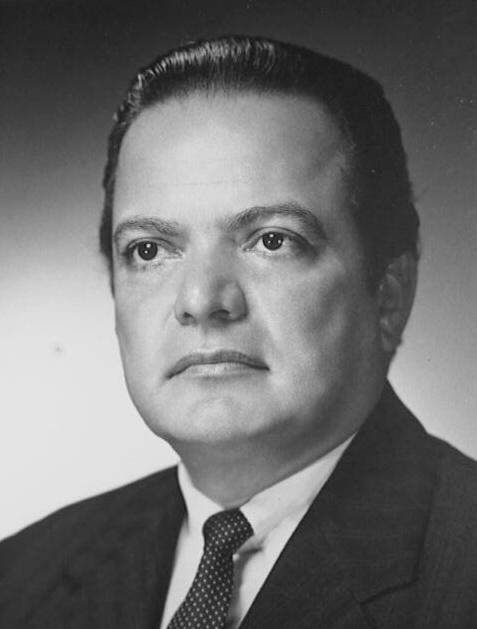
Nominee	Rodrigo Carazo	Luis Alberto Monge
Party	CU	PLN
Running mate	Rodrigo Altmann; José Miguel Alfaro	Alfonso Carro; Juan Rafael Arias
Popular vote	419,824	364,285
Percentage	50.51%	43.83%
- Results by district Carazo: 30-40% 40-50% 50-60% 60-70% Monge: 40–50% 50–60% 60–70% 70-80% 90-100% Tie: 40-50%
President before election
Daniel Oduber
PLN
Elected President
Rodrigo Carazo
CU
- Legislative election
- All 57 seats in the Legislative Assembly; 29 seats needed for a majority
- Turnout: 81.24% (▲1.35pp)
Party	Leader	Vote %	Seats	+/–
CU	Rodrigo Carazo Odio	43.41	27	New
PLN	Luis Alberto Monge	38.86	25	−2
PU	Rodrigo Gutiérrez Sáenz	7.66	3	New
FPC	Rodolfo Cerdas Cruz	1.56	1	New
PUAC	Martín Rolando Brenes	0.96	1	0
This lists parties that won seats. See the complete results below.
Results by province

General elections were held in Costa Rica on 5 February 1978. Rodrigo Carazo Odio of the opposition Unity Coalition won the presidential election. His coalition also obtained the largest number of seats in the Legislative Assembly, but fell two seats short of a majority. Voter turnout was 81%.

Carazo, a former congressman and former member of the National Liberation Party, widely regarded as the country’s dominant political force at the time, left the party in 1972 and founded his own political group, Democratic Renovation. A fragmented opposition in the 1974 election had facilitated a relatively easy victory for the PLN, which secured 43.4% of the vote. In response, leading figures of the non-Marxist opposition began negotiations to present a unified candidacy in subsequent elections.

Eventually, these negotiations proved successful, and the principal opposition parties to the right of the government reached an agreement to present a unified candidacy. A primary election was held to select the coalition’s nominee, in which Rodrigo Carazo Odio narrowly defeated the industrialist Miguel Barzuna.

Although some leaders withdrew from the coalition following the primary (most notably Jorge González Martén of the National Independent Party and former president Mario Echandi Jiménez) the majority of the opposition leadership remained united.

The Unity Coalition was subsequently formed through the alliance of four parties: Carazo’s Democratic Renovation; the People’s Union led by former president José Joaquín Trejos Fernández; the Republican Party led by Rafael Ángel Calderón Fournier, son of former president Rafael Ángel Calderón Guardia; and the Christian Democratic Party headed by Jorge Arturo Monge, the smallest but the most ideologically cohesive group within the coalition.

The left also made a coalition; the three main far-left parties at the left of the PLN; the People's Vanguard Party, the Costa Rican Socialist Party and Revolutionary People's Movement made the United People coalition, nominating former PLN member and doctor Rodrigo Gutierrez. Although Gutiérrez was not considered a leading contender for the presidency, the coalition contributed to an increase in left-wing electoral support and enabled the parties to secure a more substantial representation in the Legislative Assembly.

For many historians, this election is considered the beginning of Costa Rica’s two-party system, which would dominate national politics for more than two decades, lasting until the 2002 general election.

== Results ==
=== President ===
Candidate	Party	Votes	%
Rodrigo Carazo Odio	Unity Coalition	419,824	50.51
Luis Alberto Monge	National Liberation Party	364,285	43.83
Rodrigo Alberto Gutiérrez Sáenz	United People	22,740	2.74
Guillermo Villalobos Arce	National Unification Party	13,666	1.64
Gerardo Villalobos Garita	Independent Party	3,822	0.46
Jorge González Martén	National Independent Party	3,323	0.40
Carlos Coronado Vargas	Workers' Socialist Organization Party	1,868	0.22
Rodrigo Cordero Víquez	Democratic Party	1,613	0.19
Total		831,141	100.00
Valid votes		831,141	96.62
Invalid votes		23,691	2.75
Blank votes		5,374	0.62
Total votes		860,206	100.00
Registered voters/turnout		1,058,455	81.27
Source: Election Resources

==== By province ====
Province	Carazo %	Monge %	Gutiérrez %	Villalobos %	Villalobos %	González %	Coronado %	Cordero%
San José	52.1	42.4	2.9	1.4	0.4	0.4	0.2	0.1
Alajuela	50.6	45.7	1.6	1.2	0.4	0.3	0.1	0.1
Cartago	47.1	47.3	2.0	1.9	0.6	0.6	0.2	0.3
Heredia	51.2	44.2	2.9	0.9	0.4	0.3	0.2	0.1
Puntarenas	48.0	42.8	4.6	2.8	0.6	0.6	0.3	0.3
Limón	49.9	38.3	5.9	3.7	0.7	0.7	0.4	0.4
Guanacaste	49.3	46.2	1.4	1.7	0.5	0.4	0.3	0.3
Total	50.5	43.8	2.7	1.6	0.5	0.4	0.2	0.2

=== Legislative Assembly ===
Party	Votes	%	Seats	+/–
Unity Coalition	356,215	43.41	27	New
National Liberation Party	318,904	38.86	25	–2
United People	62,865	7.66	3	New
National Unification Party	25,824	3.15	0	–16
Costa Rican Peoples' Front	12,834	1.56	1	+1
Republican Union Party	8,215	1.00	0	New
Cartago Agrarian Union Party	7,887	0.96	1	0
National Independent Party	6,673	0.81	0	–6
Independent Party	5,774	0.70	0	0
Workers' Socialist Organization Party	4,059	0.49	0	New
Democratic Party	3,083	0.38	0	–1
Authentic Limonense Party	2,954	0.36	0	New
Costa Rican Concord Party	2,542	0.31	0	New
Authentic Puntarenense Party	1,729	0.21	0	New
National Labour Party	1,002	0.12	0	New
Total	820,560	100.00	57	0
Valid votes	820,560	95.43		
Invalid votes	25,731	2.99		
Blank votes	13,597	1.58		
Total votes	859,888	100.00		
Registered voters/turnout	1,058,455	81.24		
Source: Election Resources

==== By province ====
Province	CU		PLN		PU		PUN		FPCR		PUR		PNI		PI		POST		PD		Others	
Province	%	S	%	S	%	S	%	S	%	S	%	S	%	S	%	S	%	S	%	S	%	S
San José	44.6	10	36.9	8	9.3	2	2.1	0	3.1	1	0.8	0	0.5	0	0.7	0	1.2	0	0.4	0	0.3	0
Alajuela	46.2	5	42.8	5	4.2	0	4.3	0	-	-	1.0	0	0.8	0	0.7	0	0.5	0	0.4	0	1.2	0
Cartago	36.7	2	39.2	3	5.6	0	3.5	0	-	-	1.9	0	1.3	0	1.1	0	-	-	0.6	0	10.1	1
Heredia	44.7	2	40.5	2	9.5	0	2.2	0	-	-	0.5	0	0.7	0	0.7	0	-	-	0.2	0	1.0	0
Puntarenas	39.7	3	38.3	3	8.9	1	4.3	0	3.0	0	1.2	0	1.0	0	0.9	0	-	-	0.4	0	2.3	0
Limón	38.7	2	30.3	2	12.0	0	4.5	0	-	-	2.1	0	3.2	0	0.9	0	-	-	0.5	0	7.8	0
Guanacaste	45.5	3	43.0	2	4.2	0	4.1	0	-	-	1.3	0	0.7	0	0.6	0	-	-	0.3	0	0.2	0
Total	43.4	27	38.9	25	7.7	3	3.1	0	1.6	1	1.0	0	0.8	0	0.7	0	0.4	0	0.4	0	2.0	0

=== Local governments ===
Party	Votes	%	Seats			
Party	Votes	%	Alderpeople	+/–	Municipal syndics	+/–
Unity Coalition	365,902	44.62	230	New	228	New
National Liberation Party	328,009	40.00	213	–12	177	–173
United People	52,707	6.43	23	New	0	New
National Unification Party	29,598	3.61	4	–146	0	–37
Costa Rican Peoples' Front	10,153	1.24	1	+1	0	0
Republican Union Party	10,005	1.22	0	New	0	New
National Independent Party	7,623	0.93	0	–48	0	–2
Independent Party	3,726	0.45	1	+1	1	+1
Democratic Party of the People	2,254	0.27	0	New	0	New
Authentic Puntarenense Party	2,207	0.27	1	New	0	New
Desamparadenean Alliance Party	2,062	0.25	1	New	0	New
Authentic Limonense Party	2,008	0.24	1	New	0	New
Costa Rican Concord Party	1,705	0.21	0	New	0	New
Worker-Peasant Party	1,104	0.13	1	New	0	New
Democratic Party	568	0.07	0	0	0	0
Workers' Socialist Organization Party	461	0.06	0	New	0	New
Total	820,092	100.00	476	+9	406	+16
Valid votes	820,092	95.36				
Invalid/blank votes	39,909	4.64				
Total votes	860,001	100.00				
Registered voters/turnout	1,058,445	81.25				
Source: TSE
