= Jorge Rossi Chavarría =

Costa Rican politician, lawyer and businessman (1922–2016)

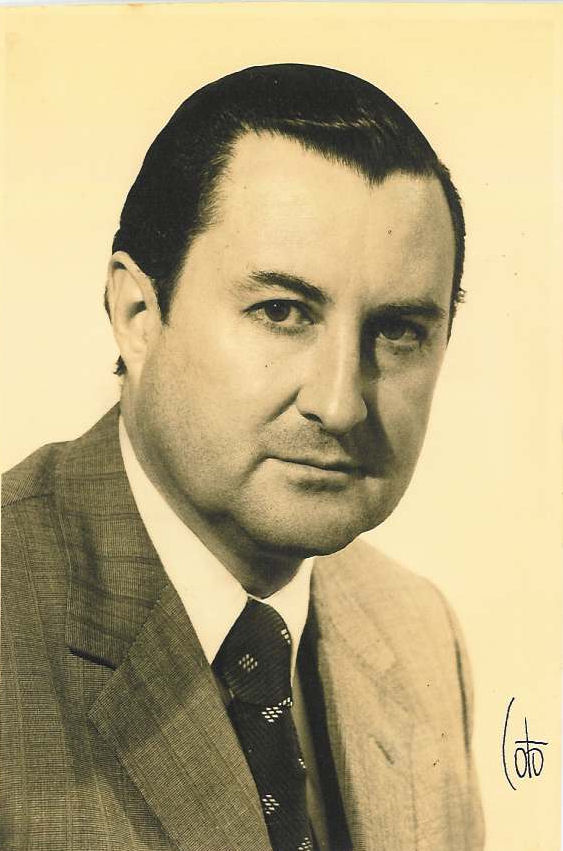
- Rossi in 1940

Deputy of the Legislative Assembly of Costa Rica
- In office 8 May 1986 – 8 May 1990
- Preceded by: Fernando Guzmán Mata
- Succeeded by: Rafael Sanabria Solano
- Constituency: Cartago (1st Office)

Second Vice President of Costa Rica
- In office 8 May 1970 – 8 May 1974 Serving with Manuel Aguilar Bonilla
- President: José Figueres Ferrer
- Preceded by: Virgilio Calvo Sánchez
- Succeeded by: Fernando Guzmán Mata

Minister of Economy and Finance
- In office 8 November 1953 – 1956
- President: José Figueres Ferrer
- Preceded by: Office established

Personal details
- Born: Jorge Rossi Chavarría; 25 January 1922 San José, Costa Rica
- Died: 3 January 2006 (aged 83) San José, Costa Rica
- Party: PLN (1951–1956; 1958–2016)
- Other political affiliations: Independent Party (1956–1958)
- Spouse(s): Virginia Umaña Volio (m. 1945; died 1980) Marie Bravo Rudin (m. 1983)
- Children: 3
- Education: University of Costa Rica (LLB)
- Occupation: Lawyer; politician; businessman; professor

Jorge Rossi Chavarría (25 January 1922 – 3 January 2006) was a Costa Rican lawyer, businessman and politician who served as Second Vice President of Costa Rica from 1970 to 1974. A co-founder of the National Liberation Party, he previously served as Minister of Economy and Finance from 1953 to 1956.

Rossi was the son of José Monge and Chavarría Amalia Flores. At age 15, he was the national champion in the second category (1937). He earned a degree in law at the University of Costa Rica and joined the Bar Association on June 12, 1945. He served as president of the Graduate Student Council. During the Revolution of 1948, he and his brothers Alvaro and Hernán joined the revolutionary army known as the Caribbean Legion.

He was a professor at the Faculty of Economics and Social Sciences at the University of Costa Rica. During the years 1947 and 1948, he served as legal advisor to the Costa Rican Confederation of Workers of Rerum novarum. He co-founded the National Liberation Party (PLN) in 1951.

He served as Minister of Economy and Finance during the second term of Figueres Ferrer (1953 to 1956), and ran as a presidential candidate in 1958. He was the president of the Central Bank of Costa Rica from November 1970 to May 1971.

As an entrepreneur, he founded the company customs Corman, one of the most important of the country and was one of the main drivers of banana production.

In 2002, he published " La traición de los leales " - under the auspices of the UNED - an autobiography where he recounted his life throughout the twentieth century.

In his private life, he was supernumerary of the Personal prelature of Opus Dei. He was involved in social work, promoting projects to provide land and housing for farmers and workers. The exact scope of his social work is unknown, since he always tried to remain anonymous. As the newspaper Nacion stated the day after his death, he will be remembered as "the patriot" in business and government circles and among his friends, "because of his great contribution to the nation's development."

He had three children from his first marriage to Virginia Umaña Volio.

Jorge Rossi Chavarria died of a heart attack at the age of 84.
