= Cartago Agrarian Union Party =

Cartago Agrarian Union Party Partido Unión Agrícola Cartaginés
- President: Juan Guillermo Brenes Castillo (deceased)
- Secretary-General: María de los Ángeles Brenes Fernández
- Treasurer: Cecilia Fernández Martínez
- Founded: 22 June 1969
- Headquarters: East side of the church, in front of the CNP, Cervantes, Alvarado
- Ideology: Agrarianism; Regionalism
- Colors: Purple, White, Blue
- Town council of Paraiso: 1 / 7
- Declared inactive: 27 January 2022

Party flag

The Cartago Agrarian Union Party (Spanish: Partido Unión Agrícola Cartaginés) was a political party in Cartago Province, Costa Rica.

The party was founded in 1969 by Juan Guillermo Brenes Castillo. It first contested a general election in 1970, but received only 0.5% of the vote and failed to win a seat. In 1974 support for the party more than doubled, receiving 1.2% of the vote and winning its first seat. Despite seeing its share of the vote drop to 1%, the party retained its seat in the 1978 elections. However a further slump to 0.8% in 1982 saw the party lose its parliamentary representation.

It regained a seat in the 1986 elections, receiving 1.2% of the national vote. The seat was retained in elections in 1990 and 1994, but a loss of support in the 1998 elections saw its share of the vote drop to 0.5%, resulting in it losing its solitary seat. A similar result in 2002 saw the party remaining seatless.
