= Jorge Luis Villanueva Badilla =

Costa Rican lawyer and politician (1928–2018)

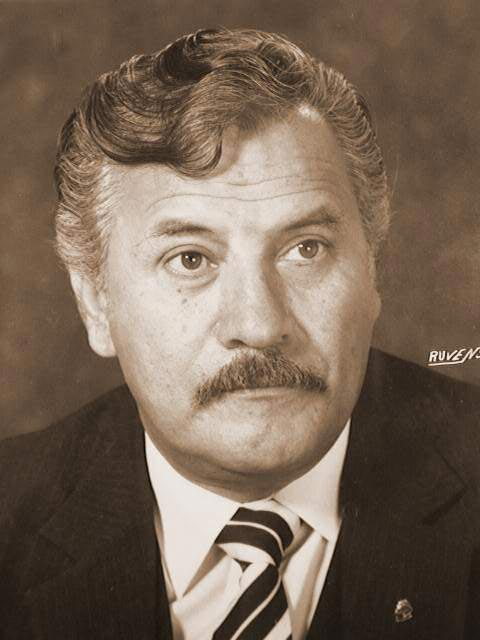
- Villanueva in 1983

25th President of the Legislative Assembly of Costa Rica
- In office 1 May 1983 – 30 April 1984
- Preceded by: Bernal Jiménez Monge
- Succeeded by: Hernán Garrón Salazar

Deputy of the Legislative Assembly of Costa Rica
- In office 1 May 1998 – 30 April 2002
- Preceded by: Bernal Aragón Barquero
- Succeeded by: Elvida Irene Navarro Vargas
- Constituency: San José (11th Office)
- In office 1 May 1982 – 30 April 1986
- Preceded by: Cristian Tattenbach Iglesias
- Succeeded by: María Guevara Fallas
- Constituency: San José (5th Office)
- In office 1 May 1966 – 30 April 1970
- Preceded by: Jesús Benavides Murillo
- Succeeded by: Jorge Solano Chacón
- Constituency: Cartago (2nd Office)

Personal details
- Born: Jorge Luis Villanueva Badilla; 24 February 1928 Cartago, Costa Rica
- Died: 10 February 2018 (aged 89) Cartago, Costa Rica
- Party: PLN
- Education: University of Costa Rica (LLB)

Jorge Luis Villanueva Badilla (24 February 1928 – 10 February 2018) was a Costa Rican lawyer and politician who served as the 25th President of the Legislative Assembly from 1983 to 1984. A member of the National Liberation Party, he served three terms as a deputy and held several positions in municipal government and public administration.

== Biography ==
Villanueva Badilla was born in Cartago on 24 February 1928, the son of Luis Manuel Villanueva Pazol and Agustina Badilla. He studied law at the University of Costa Rica, where he obtained a law degree. During the Costa Rican Civil War of 1948, he participated on the side of the forces led by José Figueres Ferrer, where he reached the rank of lieutenant. Following the war, he became a member of the National Liberation Party.

Villanueva married Teresita Monge Arias, with whom he had seven children: Zarela, Teresita, Rosa, Circe, Luis Gerardo, Djenane, and Lucía Villanueva Monge. Two of his children subsequently held prominent public positions. His son Luis Gerardo Villanueva Monge served as a deputy and president of the Legislative Assembly, while his daughter Zarela Villanueva Monge served as a magistrate and later president of the Supreme Court of Justice of Costa Rica.

He practiced law and held several positions in Cartago. He served as a councillor and as president and secretary of the Municipality of Cartago. He also worked as an attorney for the Agricultural Credit Bank of Cartago and served as an alternate civil judge in Cartago. In education, he taught Commercial Law at the Cartago Vocational School of Arts and Crafts (COVAO), where he also served as an administrator. He was additionally involved in the administration of the Cartago orphanage, serving as both administrator and president.

Villanueva was first elected to the Legislative Assembly for the 1966–1970 legislative term. He subsequently returned to the Assembly for the 1982–1986 and 1998–2002 legislative terms. In 1966, Villanueva represented Costa Rica at a congress of the Latin American Parliament in Brazil, and later served as vice president of the organization.

In 1983, he represented Costa Rica at the 71st Conference of the Inter-Parliamentary Union, held in Seoul, South Korea.

== Later life and death ==
Villanueva Badilla died in Cartago on 10 February 2018, aged 89.
