= United People (Costa Rica) =

United People Pueblo Unido
- Founded: 1978
- Dissolved: Post-2002
- Ideology: Communism; Marxism-Leninism; Trotskyism
- Political position: Left-wing

Party flag

United People (Spanish: Pueblo Unido) was a left-wing political alliance, registered as a political party, in Costa Rica.

The alliance was founded ahead of the 1978 elections by the Popular Vanguard Party (PVP), the Costa Rican Socialist Party (PSC) and the Revolutionary Movement of the People (MRP), and won three seats. In 1982 it increased its representation to four seats. However, it was reduced to a single seat in the 1986 elections. It retained the seat in the 1990 elections, but lost its parliamentary representation in 1994 when it did not contest the elections. It returned in 1998, but failed to win a seat. For the 2002 elections the alliance was part of Coalition Change 2000, but again failed to win a seat.
