= Emilia Molina Cruz =

Costa Rican politician and social worker

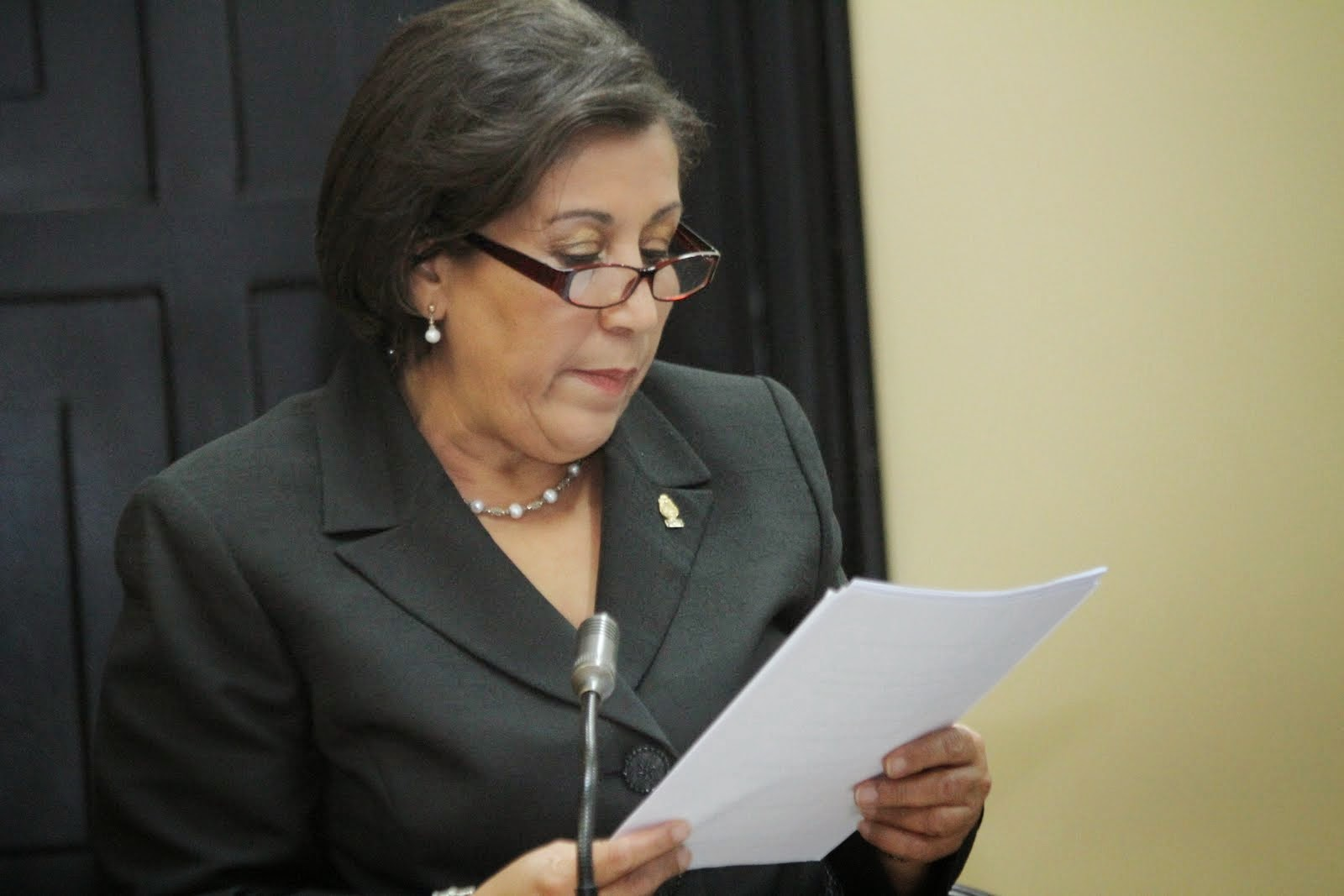

Deputy Legislative Assembly of Costa Rica
- In office 2014–2018
- Constituency: Cartago

Personal details
- Born: Costa Rica
- Party: Citizens' Action Party (2000-2005) (2006-today) Patriotic Union (2005-2006)
- Profession: Social worker, entrepreneur

Emilia Molina Cruz is a Costa Rican politician, social worker, and entrepreneur. She was a deputy in the Legislative Assembly of Costa Rica for the 2014–2018 term.

Molina holds a bachelor's degree and a licentiate in social work, as well as a Master's in political science from the University of Costa Rica.

Molina taught in the School of Social Work from 1976 to 2007 at the University of Costa Rica. She was Vice Rector from 1989 to 1990. in addition, she directed the School of Social Work from 1998 to 2001. She was a visiting professor at the University of Jaén, Spain in 2001. Molina owns several private tourism businesses.

In 2006, she was the unsuccessful second vice presidential nominee from the Patriotic Union Party.

Molina subsequently returned to the Citizens' Action Party (PAC for its Spanish initials). She then served as the first Treasurer on the National Executive Committee. In addition, she has served as a regional coordinator since 2009. She worked for the successful Luis Guillermo Solís campaign of 2014.

She was elected as a deputy for Cartago in 2014.

She was also her party's nominee for the first Vice Presidency, in the 2022 general election.
