= Patriotic Alliance (Costa Rica) =

Patriotic Alliance Alianza Patriótica
- President: Jorge Araya Westover
- Secretary-General: Adrián José Zúñiga Bonilla
- Founded: 1978
- Registered: May 10th, 2009
- Dissolved: January 24, 2022
- Ideology: Social democracy Progressivism
- Political position: Center-left to left-wing

Patriotic Alliance (Spanish: Alianza Patriótica) is a political party in Costa Rica.

Originally named Alajuelense Democratic Action was a provincial party for the Alajuela Province. The first general elections contested by the party were in 1982, when it won a single seat. However, it won only 0.3% of the vote at the 1986 elections and lost its seat. It did not contest the 1990 elections, but returned in 1994, winning 0.8% of the vote, but no seats. In 1998 it received only 0.5% of the vote and remained without parliamentary representation.

In the 2002 elections the party was part of the Coalition Change 2000 that won only 0.8% of the vote and no seats. In 2009 the party was renamed as Patriotic Alliance and became of national-level nominating Rolando Araya (former PLN member) as presidential candidate, but Araya dropped from the race and he and his party endorsed PAC's candidate Ottón Solís in the 2010 ballot. On the 2014 election the party also endorsed PAC's candidate, this time Luis Guillermo Solís.
