= Authentic Limonense Party =

Regionalist political party in Costa Rica

Limonese Authentic Party Partido Auténtico Limonense
- President: Junior Albert Allen Wilson
- Secretary-General: Francisca Eva Narvaez Cascante
- Founded: August 17th, 1976 (original party); May 3rd, 2014
- Ideology: Regionalism; Agrarianism; Social liberalism
- Political position: Centre to Centre-left
- Colours: Green, Yellow and Light blue
- Legislative Assembly: 0 / 57
- Mayors: 1 / 6
- Aldermen: 5 / 51

Party flag

The Limonese Authentic Party (Spanish: Partido Auténtico Limonense) is a political party in Limón, Costa Rica. PAL was founded on 17 August 1976 by Marvin Wright Lindo, a radical trade union leader with links to groups such as Socialist Workers Organization and the Workers' Party. It became a notable force amongst the banana plantation workers at the Atlantic coast.

Wright is the president of the party. Delroy Carl Senior Grant is the General Secretary and Fredrick Patterson Bent is the treasurer. PAL works for economic autonomy for Limón.

In the 2016 local elections the party obtains the mayoralty of the municipality of Limón and 5 aldermen in the Limón Municipal Council.

It is currently contesting the 2018 general election for a seat in Limon's representation in the Legislative Assembly.
