= Unity Coalition =

Unity Coalition Coalición Unidad
- Founded: 13 August 1976
- Dissolved: 1983
- Succeeded by: Social Christian Unity Party

Party flag

The Unity Coalition (Coalición Unidad) was a Costa Rican political coalition of right-wing opposition parties made in the 70s and oppose to the then ruling centre-left National Liberation Party. Four parties made the coalition; Democratic Renewal, Christian Democrats, People's Union and Republican Calderonista. After a primary election from which Rodrigo Carazo Odio was victorious the coalition presented him as candidate winning the 1978 elections. Eventually the Coalition merged forming the Social Christian Unity Party in 1983.
