= Worker-Peasant Party =

Worker-Peasant Party Partido Obrero Campesino
- Founded: 1977
- Dissolved: 1982
- Headquarters: Cartago
- Ideology: Communism; Marxism–Leninism; Maoism; Anti-revisionism
- Political position: Far-left

Worker-Peasant Party (Spanish: Partido Obrero Campesino) was a communist party in Costa Rica. It was mainly based in Cartago Province. The party was led by Juan Diego Fernández, and was of Maoist orientation.

== See also ==
- List of anti-revisionist groups
