= Rodrigo Carazo Odio =

President of Costa Rica from 1978 to 1982

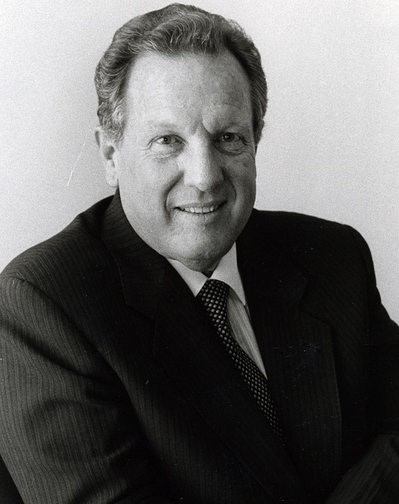

38th President of Costa Rica
- In office 8 May 1978 – 8 May 1982
- Vice President: Rodrigo Altmann Ortiz; José Miguel Alfaro Rodríguez
- Preceded by: Daniel Oduber Quirós
- Succeeded by: Luis Alberto Monge

12th President of the Legislative Assembly
- In office 1 May 1966 – 30 April 1967
- Preceded by: Rodolfo Solano Orfila
- Succeeded by: Hernán Garrón Salazar

Deputy of the Legislative Assembly from San José's 1st seat
- In office 1 May 1966 – 30 April 1970
- Preceded by: Carlos Espinach Escalante
- Succeeded by: Daniel Oduber Quirós

Personal details
- Born: Rodrigo José Ramón Francisco de Jesús Carazo Odio; 27 December 1926 Cartago, Costa Rica
- Died: 9 December 2009 (aged 82) San José, Costa Rica
- Party: Unity Coalition
- Other political affiliations: Democratic Renewal Party (1972-1977); National Liberation Party (until 1970)
- Spouse(s): Estrella Zeledón Lizano (m. 1947–2009; his death)
- Children: 5, including Rodrigo Alberto
- Education: University of Costa Rica (BEc)
- Occupation: Politician; economist
- Awards: Order of Merit of the Italian Republic
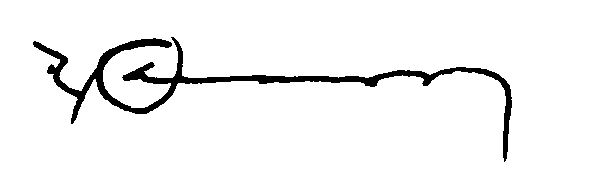
- Signature

Rodrigo José Ramón Francisco de Jesús Carazo Odio (27 December 1926 – 9 December 2009) was a Costa Rican economist and politician who served as the 38th President of Costa Rica from 8 May 1978 to 8 May 1982.

== Early life ==
Carazo was born in Cartago. Before serving as president, he was the Director of the Central Bank, General Manager for RECOPE (Costa Rica's nationalized oil refinery business) and President of the Legislative Assembly of Costa Rica (1966-1967).

He married Estrella Zeledón Lizano in San José on April 16, 1947. The couple had five children: Rodrigo Alberto, Mario Ernesto, Jorge Manuel, Álvaro, and Rolando Martin. Their son, Rolando, was killed in a motorcycle accident in Rohrmoser, Costa Rica, in December 1979. He was traveling alone on his motorcycle when he failed to negotiate a turn losing control and colliding with a tree. He was 26 years old.

== Presidency ==
During and immediately following his term, Carazo played a central role in the founding of the University for Peace, a United Nations-affiliated educational institution that offers graduate programs in peace and development studies. His government also concentrated on and promoted the country's petrochemical industry and even began exploration and digging near the Talamanca Mountain Ridge in search for petroleum. In the energy sector, his government inaugurated the hydroelectric plant in Lake Arenal. The Carazo government also regulated the excavation of gold in the southern region of the country.

On the international front, Carazo had to deal mainly with the radical changes in the neighboring country of Nicaragua, which had been under the control of the Somoza dictatorship for decades, whose rule Costa Rica had always opposed. As the Sandinista movement rose in the 1970s, Nicaragua was faced with civil unrest and small armed clashes. Costa Rica's government supported any movement against Somoza and so backed the Sandinista insurgents. Many of the battles that took place in the Nicaraguan region bordering Costa Rica spilled onto Costa Rican soil. Carazo's government warned Somoza to stay on his side of the border several times.

The government also started planning for the creation of a defence force to fight off any Somoza attempt to attack Costa Rican territory. The attacks finally ended in 1979 once the Sandinistas took control of the country, and Somoza was exiled. The government received a strong backlash from the public, and the opposition claimed that Carazo had failed to protect Costa Rica's sovereignty. Furthermore, Carazo's government allowed three US helicopters to touch down on national soil to facilitate Somoza's escape from Nicaragua. That sent the President's critics on a political bashing rampage, calling the matter a disrespect to national sovereignty. Later, in 1982, the Central American Democratic Community was formed in San José with US backing. Its aim was to isolate Nicaragua from the rest of Central America as long as they had a Communist regime in power. Another big move was in 1981, when Carazo's government broke off all diplomatic ties with Fidel Castro's Cuba.

Carazo's government was plagued by economic instability and social unrest. During his presidency, there was a world economic recession. Petroleum prices were at historic highs, and the value of Costa Rica's main crop, coffee, was falling. Against the advice of his Minister of Finance, Hernán Sáenz Jiménez, and the International Monetary Fund (IMF), Carazo instructed the Central Bank of Costa Rica to borrow heavily to maintain the value of the colón, the local currency, in the hope that an economic recovery was close at hand. That policy eventually became unsustainable, leading to a catastrophic sudden devaluation in September 1980. The heavy load of debt that the central bank acquired contributed to the highest rates of inflation that Costa Rica has endured ever since.

After stepping down as president in 1982, Carazo became a well-known critic of the IMF and other global financial institutions. In his last years, he campaigned vigorously against the Central American Free Trade Agreement (CAFTA).

== Later life ==
Carazo played a leadership role in initiatives to improve relations between North Korea and the West. He made several visits to Pyongyang in the early 1990s. His efforts contributed to the opening of unofficial channels of communication between the United States and North Korea.

Carazo was the founding Chairman of University for Peace and United World Colleges Costa Rica.

Carazo died from heart failure and multi-organ failure at the Hospital México in San José on December 9, 2009, at the age of 82. He was survived by his wife, former First Lady Estrella Zeledón Lizano, and four of their five children: Rodrigo Alberto, Mario Ernesto, Jorge Manuel and Álvaro.

Political offices
Preceded by Daniel Oduber Quirós	President of Costa Rica; 1978–1982	Succeeded by Luis Alberto Monge Álvarez
