= List of constitutions of Costa Rica =

Costa Rica has possessed multiple and very varied constitutional bodies.

The Constitutional Assemblies of Costa Rica have been, in almost all cases, convened after a coup d'état or armed conflict, since it is the custom in Costa Rica that when a government is deposed, an Assembly will be convened to draft a new constitutional body that legitimizes the new regime. This was true from the first Constituent Congress of the State of Costa Rica convened shortly after the independence of Central America until the most recent National Constituent Assembly of 1949, which occurred after the Civil War of 1948.

Constitution	Validity	State
Cadiz Constitution	1812-1814 and 1820-1821	Diputación of the Spanish Empire
Pact of Concord	1821-1823	Province of Costa Rica, at least nominally member of the First Mexican Empire
First Political Statute of the Province of Costa Rica	1823	Province of Costa Rica, at least nominally member of the First Mexican Empire
Second Political Statute of the Province of Costa Rica	1823-1824	Federal Republic of Central America
Basis of the Federal Constitution	1823-1824	Federal Republic of Central America
Constitution of the Federal Republic of Central America	1824-1838	Federal Republic of Central America
Fundamental Law of the State of Costa Rica	1825-1838	Federal Republic of Central America
Decree of Basis and Guarantees	1841-1842	Free State of Costa Rica
Costa Rican Constitution of 1844	1844-1846	First Costa Rican Republic
Costa Rican Constitution of 1847	1847-1848	First Costa Rican Republic
Reformed Constitution of 1848	1848-1859	First Costa Rican Republic
Costa Rican Constitution of 1859	1859-1868	First Costa Rican Republic
Costa Rican Constitution of 1869	1869-1870	First Costa Rican Republic
Costa Rican Constitution of 1871	1871-1876; 1882-1917; 1919-1949	First Costa Rican Republic
Costa Rican Constitution of 1917	1917-1919	First Costa Rican Republic
Costa Rican Constitution of 1949	1949-2025	Second Costa Rican Republic
