= Supreme Electoral Court of Costa Rica =

Costa Rican election commission

Supreme Electoral Court
- Tribunal Supremo de Elecciones
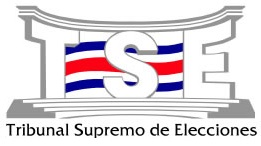

- Building of the Supreme Electoral Court in Carmen, San José.
- Interactive map of Supreme Electoral Court
- Established: 7 November 1949; 76 years ago (Constitution)
- Location: Carmen, San José
- Composition method: Appointment by the Supreme Court of Justice
- Authorised by: Constitution of Costa Rica Title I
- Judge term length: 6 years, renewable
- Number of positions: 9
- Website: www.tse.go.cr

President
- Currently: Eugenia Zamora Chavarría
- Since: 16 December 2021

Vice President
- Currently: Max Esquivel Faerron
- Since: 16 December 2021

The Supreme Electoral Court (Spanish: Tribunal Supremo de Elecciones, TSE) is the constitutional organ responsible for administering elections and resolving electoral disputes in Costa Rica. It was established by the 1949 Constitution, which assigned it responsibility for the organization, direction, and supervision of activities related to suffrage.

A constitutional amendment to Article 9, enacted on 5 June 1975, granted the TSE the rank and independence of the branches of government, while assigning it "exclusive and independent responsibility" for the organization, direction, and supervision of activities related to suffrage.

The TSE exercises several functions under the Constitution and electoral legislation, including electoral administration, civil registration, electoral jurisdiction, and democratic education and training.

== History ==
The institutional predecessors of the Supreme Electoral Court date to the early 20th century. The 1925 electoral law established the National Electoral Council (CNE). The law also established a Civic Registry, whose purpose was to issue personal identification cards for voting. This institution was distinct from the Civil Registry, which had been established in 1888 to record civil status events. Although the 1925 law provided for photographs to appear on the Identity Card, the requirement was not implemented until 1936. That year, legislation also provided for photographs of candidates to appear on ballots, in part to facilitate voting by persons who could not read.

During the third administration of Ricardo Jiménez Oreamuno, electoral legislation in 1936 reduced the threshold required for a presidential candidate to be elected from 50 percent to 40 percent of valid votes. At the time, Costa Rica did not have a presidential runoff system. If no candidate obtained the required majority, the Constitutional Congress was responsible for choosing the President from among the leading candidates.

During the administration of Teodoro Picado Michalski, Law No. 500 of 7 March 1946 established Costa Rica's first comprehensive Electoral Code. The law also created a National Electoral Court (TNE), composed of three magistrates and three alternates, with the aim of removing responsibility for the administration of elections from the Executive Branch. The Tribunal was also given authority over the National Police in matters related to the electoral process.

The political crisis and Costa Rican Civil War of 1948 led to the abolition of the 1871 Constitution. Following the conflict, the Founding Junta of the Second Republic reorganized the country's political institutions. On 14 September 1948, Decree No. 171 changed the name of the National Electoral Court to the Supreme Electoral Court. The decree was published in La Gaceta on 18 September 1948. The designation "Supreme" was meant to reflect the Court's national jurisdiction and the final nature of its decisions in electoral matters.

The Constitution adopted by the National Constituent Assembly on 7 November 1949 gave the electoral authority a permanent constitutional foundation. It established the Supreme Electoral Court as the body responsible for the organization, direction, and supervision of activities related to suffrage and assigned it jurisdiction over electoral matters. The Constitution also placed the Civil Registry under the authority of the TSE.

== Functions and powers ==
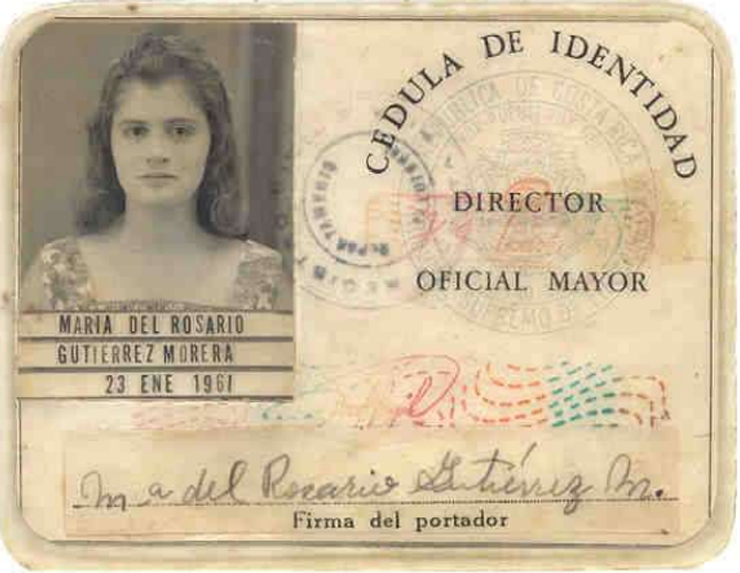
A 1961 Identity Card, which the Court issues through the Civil Registry since 1949.

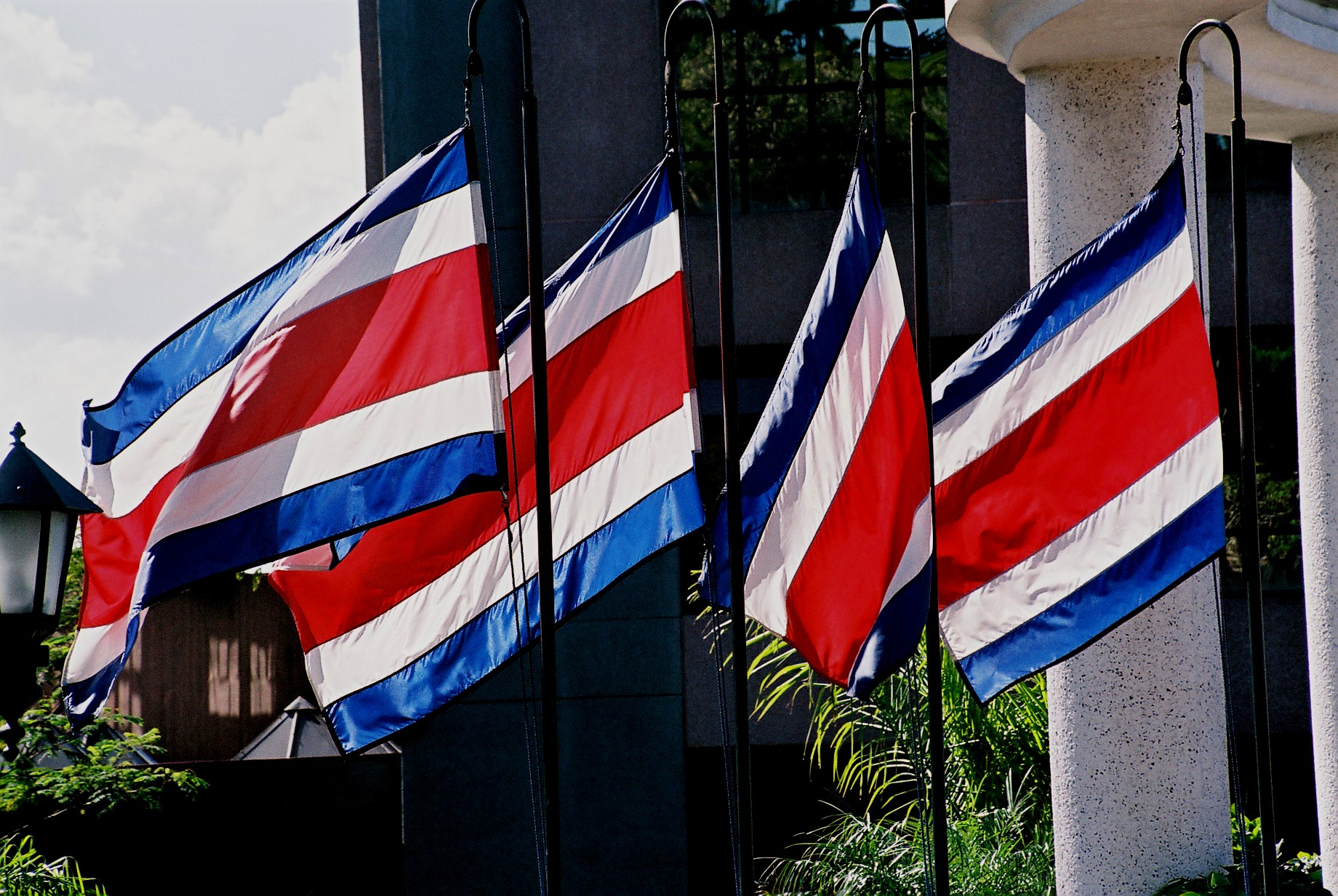
Costa Rican flags, in front of the Plaza de la Libertad Electoral (Electoral Freedom Square).

The TSE is the highest constitutional authority in electoral matters in Costa Rica, the country'is election commission. The Constitution grants it exclusive authority to interpret electoral provisions and to resolve disputes arising from the electoral process. Its responsibilities include organizing and supervising elections, maintaining the electoral register, adjudicating electoral disputes, and officially declaring the results of national and municipal elections.

The TSE also has jurisdiction over complaints and appeals concerning electoral matters, including cases involving political parties and electoral authorities. Its decisions in electoral matters are generally final and are not subject to appeal before the ordinary courts, reflecting its constitutional independence.

=== Electoral administration ===
The TSE is responsible for the organization, management, and supervision of elections in Costa Rica. Its responsibilities include preparing and maintaining the electoral register, administering electoral programs, registering political parties, overseeing political party financing, and coordinating the various stages of the electoral process.

Within the TSE, the General Directorate of the Electoral Registry and Political Party Financing is responsible for important aspects of electoral administration. Its organizational structure includes units responsible for electoral programs, the registration of political parties, and political party financing.

=== Civil registration ===
The TSE also oversees Costa Rica's civil registration system. The Civil Registry was established in 1888, prior to the creation of the TSE, and records legally significant civil-status events, including births, adoptions, marriages, divorces, deaths, and the acquisition of Costa Rican nationality.

The Civil Registry also issues documents such as the Identity Card, and provides the civil information used to prepare and maintain the electoral register. The 1949 Constitution placed the Civil Registry under the authority of the TSE, which linked civil registration with the preparation and maintenance of the electoral register.

=== Electoral jurisdiction ===
The Constitution grants the TSE judicial authority over electoral matters, distinguishing it from the ordinary judicial system. As the country's electoral court, the TSE administers electoral justice and is responsible for resolving disputes concerning elections, political participation, and the activities of political parties. Through its electoral jurisdiction, it is tasked with the protection of suffrage and fundamental political rights in electoral matters and oversees the legality and constitutionality of electoral processes and certain internal activities of political parties.

The TSE has the exclusive authority to interpret constitutional and statutory provisions concerning electoral matters. Under Articles 99 and 102.3 of the Constitution and Article 12(c) of the Electoral Code, it may issue such interpretations on its own initiative or at the request of the highest executive committee of a registered political party. Article 97 of the Constitution also requires the Legislative Assembly to consult the TSE during the legislative process on bills relating to electoral matters, with the TSE's opinion being binding in the circumstances established by the Constitution.

The magistrates of the TSE exercise judicial functions as judges of the electoral jurisdiction. The electoral jurisdiction is specialized, centralized, and generally operates as a single-instance jurisdiction, meaning that decisions of the TSE are binding and are not subject to appeal before another court or administrative body. Its electoral rulings therefore have final authority within the electoral jurisdiction. The Court may, however, subsequently adopt a different interpretation of an issue through changes in its jurisprudence, including as a result of a change in the composition of the Court or a different legal approach.

The development of electoral jurisprudence expanded significantly during the early 21st century. The Electoral Code of 2009 established a more comprehensive framework for electoral justice and set out procedures for resolving disputes before the electoral jurisdiction, including electoral appeals and other legal remedies. The Code also introduced provisions concerning the internal democratization of political parties, established gender parity and alternation requirements, incorporated the Electoral Registry and the Institute for Training and Studies in Democracy (IFED) into the TSE's institutional structure, and provided for voting by Costa Rican citizens residing abroad.

=== Democratic education and training ===
The TSE is also responsible for promoting democratic participation and civic education. The Institute for Training and Studies in Democracy (IFED) is a specialized unit within the TSE that conducts educational, training, research, and documentation activities relating to democracy and elections.

IFED provides training for political parties and other participants in the electoral process, supports civic education initiatives, conducts research, and maintains resources relating to democracy and elections.

== Composition and appointment ==
The TSE is normally composed of three full magistrates and six alternate magistrates. During the period beginning one year before and ending six months after general elections, two alternate magistrates serve as full magistrates, increasing the Court's membership to five.

The magistrates are appointed and sworn by the Supreme Court of Justice of Costa Rica by a two-thirds majority of its members. They serve six-year terms and may be reelected. The Constitution and electoral legislation establish restrictions on partisan political activity by TSE magistrates and institutional personnel.

The current magistrates of the TSE are:

Election Commission
Office	Name	Role	Since
Magistrate	Eugenia María Zamora Chavarría	President of the Court	7 September 2005
Magistrate	Max Alberto Esquivel Faerron	Vice President of the Court	27 July 2007
Magistrate	Zetty María Bou Valverde		12 August 2018
Alternate Magistrate	Héctor Fernández Masis	Director General of the Electoral and Political Party Financing Registry	31 October 2023
Alternate Magistrate	Luis Diego Brenes Villalobos		December 2015
Alternate Magistrate	Mary Anne Mannix Arnold	Electoral Inspector	19 December 2016
Alternate Magistrate	Hugo Picado León	Director of the Institute for Training and Studies in Democracy	22 July 2019
Alternate Magistrate	Wendy González Araya	Legal Counsel	31 October 2023
Alternate Magistrate	Vacant		6 August 2026

== Rulings and decisions ==
The TSE has issued decisions concerning a wide range of electoral and political rights. In 2018, it authorized transgender Costa Ricans to change the name and sex designation on their identity documents in accordance with their gender identity. The measure affected the identity documents used for electoral purposes and was part of a broader development of Costa Rican rules concerning gender identity and civil registration.

In 2026, the Legislative Assembly considered legislation concerning accountability requirements applicable to the TSE, including a proposal requiring the institution to submit an annual public accountability report.
