= Founding Junta of the Second Republic =

1948–1949 government of Costa Rica

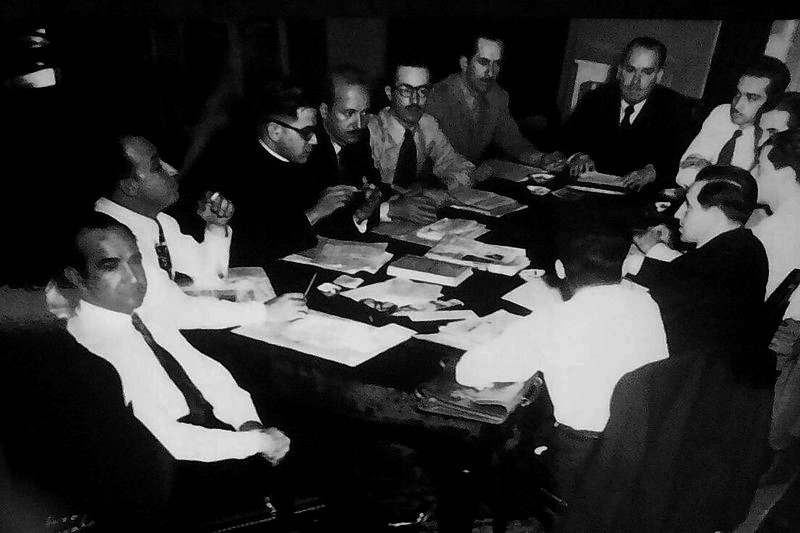
Members of the Founding Junta

The Founding Junta of the Second Republic was a de facto government which existed in the Republic of Costa Rica from May 8, 1948, to November 8, 1949, with the overthrow of the constitutional president Teodoro Picado Michalski, by a group of revolutionaries headed by José Figueres Ferrer.

After the end of the Civil War which lasted 44 days and the peace agreements negotiated in the Mexican Embassy and the Ochomogo area known as Ochomogo Pact and Mexican Embassy Pact, Picado agreed to resign and Vice President Santos León Herrera took over for the remaining of the period; a little more than a month until May 8, 1948. As agreed in the Figueres-Ulate Pact, Figueres would rule by decree for 18 months and then power will be given to president-elect and alleged winner of the 1948 Costa Rican general election Otilio Ulate Blanco.

== Background ==
The presidential elections of February 8, 1948, were won by the candidate Otilio Ulate Blanco of the National Union Party, against Rafael Ángel Calderón Guardia, candidate of the then in government National Republican Party.

The rejection of the result by the "calderonistas" and the shooting in which two police officers died and Dr. Carlos Luis Valverde Vega (member of the opposition) was killed, led the government-related sectors to face the opposition forces led by the National Liberation Army, commanded by José Figueres Ferrer, in the period between March 12 and April 19, 1948.

The Civil War ended with the Pact of the Mexican Embassy on April 19, 1948, through which conversations and negotiations were held between the warring parties. An agreement was reached that established the exercise of the Executive Branch at the head of engineer Santos León Herrera, who would be responsible for organizing the new government; measures would be taken for the withdrawal of government troops; the most important military chiefs and officials would leave the country; the armed action would be completed and the National Liberation Army forces would advance to their new positions; guaranteeing the life and property of all citizens; as well as respect for the Social Guarantees.

On May 1, 1948, the Ulate-Figueres Pact was issued, whereby Otilio Ulate Blanco and José Figueres Ferrer agreed, among other things, that the Revolutionary Junta would govern the country without a congress for a period of eighteen months from May 8; Popular elections would be called to elect representatives to a Constituent Assembly; would immediately appoint a commission responsible for drafting a Constitution to be submitted to the Constituent; would recognize and declare immediately that on February 8, it was legitimately elected Otilio Ulate Blanco as President of Costa Rica; I would ask the Constituent Assembly to ratify the election of Otilio Ulate Blanco to exercise power in the first constitutional period of the Second Republic, which would not exceed four years and would integrate the National Electoral Tribunal (now the Supreme Electoral Tribunal of Costa Rica).

== Ideology ==
Despite its fierce anti-Communism, most of the members of the Junta were democratic socialist and social-democrats and most of them would later found the social-democratic National Liberation Party, and many of the reforms continued by the Junta were considered Progressive. The movement was also secular despite having a Catholic priest among the ministers (Benjamin Nuñez) and oppose to Calderonismo, the ideology of the National Republicans led by Rafael Ángel Calderón Guardia which was influenced by the Catholic social teachings and National Catholicism. Ulate, on the other hand was a Liberal as was his people and the Ulatistas dominated the Constituent Assembly causing some frictions among the two groups.

== Government ==
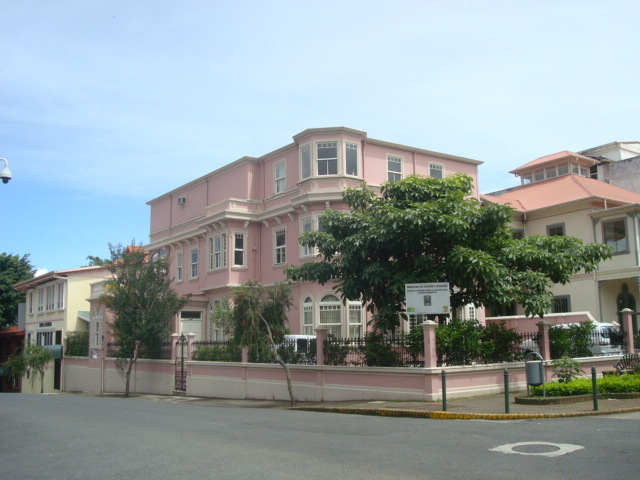
Figueres temporary house and the Junta's meeting place, today National Film Center.

Among the first decrees enacted by the Junta were the naming of the different ministers that would assume power: José Figueres Ferrer, President, Benjamín Odio Odio, Foreign Minister; Gonzalo Facio Segreda, Government and Police Minister; Alberto Martén Chavarría, Economy Minister; Uladislao Gámez Solano, Public Education Minister; Francisco Orlich Bolmarcich, Public Works Minister; Bruce Masís Dibiasi, Farming and Industries Minister; Raúl Blanco Cervantes, Public Health Minister; Rev. Benjamín Núñez Vargas, Labor Minister; and Edgar Cardona Quirós, Public Safety Minister.

The Junta also took legislative and executive powers, and the Constitution of 1871 was suspended except in regards to individual, national and social rights.

=== Persecution of opponents ===
Despite the Mexican Embassy Pact agreeing to respect the life, property and political participation of all sides, this was not accomplished. Both the Calderonistas and -specially- Communists were persecuted. Raids and arrest of hundreds of left-wing opponents were carried out and many ended up in prison. The National Republican Party and the Costa Rican Communist Party were banned, and by decree the Junta order the firing of all civil servants (especially teacher) who were Calderonistas or Communists without any kind of compensation, notice or legal severance payment. The Communist-related Confederación de Trabajadores de Costa Rica was dissolved by Labor Minister and Father Benjamín Nuñez. The immediate sanctions courts were created. Communist leaders like Manuel Mora Valverde and Carmen Lyra escaped into exile and the Codo del Diablo murders in which six members of the Communist Party were murdered whilst under police custody were carried out.

All political parties that, at the discretion of the Junta, were against "the democratic order and national sovereignty" were to be banned, and the 105 decree openly mentioned the People's Vanguard Party (legal name of the Communist Party) as banned. Secret societies and all para-military groups were also outlawed.

=== Main achievements ===
- Creation of the Supreme Electoral Tribunal: The Junta reformed the previously existing National Electoral Tribunal created in Teodoro Picado administration as a mechanism to calm the opposition's suspicions of Voter fraud in the 1948 Costa Rican general election, however the TNE was under the authority of the Congress and its decisions should be ratified by the latter. Precisely the fact that the former TNE declared the opponent Otilio Ulate the winner and the Constitutional Congress dominated by the ruling party annulled the elections broke out the civil war. The Junta transformed the Court into the highest entity of the Electoral Branch whose decisions did not pass through other bodies, a measure that was preserved in the 1949 Constitution. During this period several elections were held; one to elect the vice presidents, deputies and aldermen who would accompany Ulate during his period that began in November 1949 (since the positions of vice president and aldermen had been newly created, and the deputies previously elected were Calderonistas as the Republicans had won in the 1948 parliamentary vote and the Junta annulled this result) and another for the constituent deputies that would make up the Constituent Assembly. Figueres, who aspired to be nominated for vice president, was prevented from participating when the Assembly dominated by the Ulatismo established the prohibition of being a candidate to whom was holding government positions or had done so in the months prior to the election.
- Female suffrage: During the management of the Board, the Constituent Assembly granted the female vote. The first Costa Rican woman to cast the vote was Bernarda Vásquez Méndez in the July 30, 1950 plebiscite to decide whether the town of La Fortuna would be part of San Carlos Canton, while the first nation-wide election in which women could vote was the 1953 election.
- End of racial segregation: Figueres, who accompanied by the Afro-Costa Rican activist Alex Curling Delisser (future first black deputy of Costa Rica) had carried out his political rallies among the Limonense black population prior to the civil war, had pledged to put an end to the racial segregation in place until then and since 1821 that prohibited blacks and Chinese from leaving certain areas of Limón and Puntarenas and entering the Central Valley of Costa Rica. This became effective with the lifting of mobility bans and with the granting of votes to black and Asian citizens.
- Foundation of the Costa Rican Institute of Electricity: The Costa Rican Institute of Electricity or ICE was founded on April 8, 1949, by Decree-Law No. 449 of the Founding Junta, becoming one of the most emblematic institutions in the country comparable to the Costa Rican Social Security Fund and the University of Costa Rica. The ICE contributed to the development of the country and its welfare state, currently about 98% of the Costa Rican territory is electrified and provides electricity to other countries in Central America.
- Bank nationalization: The nationalization of the banks was made effective by decree-law No. 71 of December 29, 1949 thus turning all private banks to be State-owned. This included emblematic banks such as the Banco Anglo Costarricense and Banco Crédito Agrícola de Cartago. Nationalization, which included the confiscation of private banks, was controversial at the time and was part of the socialist measures endorsed by the Junta. The Junta was seeking to turn the banking system into a non-profit social service.
- Abolition of the army: The Junta abolished the standing army, which was later consecrated in the Constitution, giving the country a history of world-renowned pacifism, political stability and financing of health and education.

== Cardonazo ==
The Cardonazo was an attempted coup d'état carried out on April 3, 1949, in Costa Rica by the then Minister of Public Security of the de facto government, Edgar Cardona Quirós.

Although one of the causes of the war was, coincidentally, the concern of powerful groups of the conservative landowner oligarchy of the social reforms carried out by Rafael Ángel Calderón Guardia, Teodoro Picado Michalski and his allies, the communists led by Manuel Mora Valverde known as the Social Guarantees; before the end of the war, Figueres managed to agree with Picado and Mora on what became known as the Pact of the Mexican Embassy and the Ochomogo Pact respectively, not backing down with the Social Guarantees in exchange for the surrender. Pact that was fulfilled, but in addition, Figueres himself made a series of social reforms also of socialist dye.

Two in particular caused great disagreement with the conservative groups of the hardest and oligarchic right-wing; the bank nationalization and the 10% income tax. Cardona, supported by these groups, decides to take a coup d'état to depose Figueres by taking the Bellavista Military Barracks along with several rebel soldiers. Cardona requested, in addition to the repeal of these two laws, the resignation of the ministers Alberto Martén and Father Benjamín Núñez.

The government responded immediately by fencing the barracks with military and faithful volunteers (such as Frank Marshall Jiménez), 3 producing a slight confrontation of both sides within the facilities, which allowed Figueres to enter the same negotiation. José Figueres ordered the surrender to which the rebels refused. After several hours of siege they finally surrendered at three in the afternoon with a balance of nine dead and thirty wounded.

== Cease ==
The Founding Junta of the Second Republic ended its functions on November 8, 1949, and in the last session the transfer of powers to Otilio Ulate Blanco proceeded to serve as President of the Republic during the period 1949–1953.
