= Costa Rican nationality law =

Costa Rican nationality law is regulated by the Options and Naturalizations Act (Spanish: Ley de Opciones y Naturalizaciones), which was originally named the Immigration and Naturalization Act and established under the 1949 Constitution. These laws determine who is, or is eligible to be, a citizen of Costa Rica. The legal means to acquire nationality and formal membership in a nation differ from the relationship of rights and obligations between a national and the nation, known as citizenship. Costa Rican nationality is typically obtained either on the principle of jus soli, i.e. by birth in Costa Rica; or under the rules of jus sanguinis, i.e. by birth abroad to at least one parent with Costa Rican nationality. It can also be granted to a permanent resident who has lived in Costa Rica for a given period of time through naturalization.

== Acquiring Costa Rican nationality ==
Costa Rican nationality may be acquired by birth or naturalization. To qualify for naturalization, one must be an adult of good conduct and have established a domicile in Costa Rica according to the terms of Article 14 of the Constitution. It is required that applicants have a profession or sufficient sources of income to be self-sufficient and support their family, have neither been sentenced for a felony nor committed repeat offenses while living in Costa Rica, and have sufficient knowledge of Spanish to read, write and speak the language and understand the country's history and culture.

=== By birthright ===
Under the terms of Article 13 of the Constitution and Article 1 of the Options and Naturalizations Act, those who are eligible for birthright nationality include:

- Persons born in Costa Rica to Costa Rican parents;
- Persons born abroad, whose birth was recorded in the Civil Registry by the parent when a minor or by themselves before their 25th birthday, to a parent who was a birthright national of Costa Rica;
- Persons born in Costa Rica, whose birth was recorded in the Civil Registry by the parent when a minor or by themselves before their 25th birthday, to foreign parents; or
- Foundlings of unknown parentage.

=== By naturalization ===
Article 14 of the Constitution and Article 2 of the Options and Naturalizations Act, specify those who can be naturalized. They include:

- Persons who have acquired nationality under previous legislation;
- Nationals of origin from Central America, Spain, or other Latin American countries, who have established a five year domicile in Costa Rica and meet general requirements;
- Nationals who were naturalized in Central America, Spain, or other Latin American countries, who have established a seven year domicile in Costa Rica and meet general requirements;
- Foreign women who have lost their nationality by marrying a Costa Rican;
- Foreign spouses of Costa Ricans who choose to acquire nationality in the country after two years of marriage and residence in Costa Rica; or
- Persons granted honorary nationality from the Legislative Assembly.

== Loss of Costa Rican nationality ==
- Law N° 7514, which amended Article 16 of the Constitution in 1995 provides that Costa Rican nationality is an inalienable right and cannot be renounced. However, the Constitutional Chamber of the Supreme Court of Justice interpreted, in its ruling 8268-03, that the prohibition to renounce the Costa Rican nationality is not absolute, and that Costa Ricans can renounce their nationality if they wish to change it for another, provided that the person is not left stateless.

== Dual nationality ==
Members of the indigenous Guaymí or Ngäbe people were recognized as birthright nationals in 1990, despite non-compliance with registration requirements for birthright nationals of Costa Rica. The Constitutional Court ruled that they were not naturalized foreigners, as they had formerly been treated under Law No. 7024 of 1986, because of different circumstances concerning indigenous peoples. Dual nationality has been permitted in Costa Rica since the passage of Law N° 7514 in 1995.

== History ==
Costa Rica declared independence from Spain on 15 September 1821 in conjunction with the other provinces which had been part of the Captaincy General of Guatemala. The first provisional constitution of the country, known as the Pact of Concord established that citizens were free men born in the country or those from neighboring nations who had lived in Costa Rica for five years and were pledged to support independence from Spain. Between 1824 and 1838, the country was part of the Federal Republic of Central America, whose constituent states had similar nationality laws. The federal constitution for the Republic of Central America drafted in 1824 provided that nationals were born in the territories or to nationals of the constituent states. It also provided for naturalization of foreign spouses of nationals. Under terms of the General Code of the State (Spanish: El Código General del Estado), which regulated civil matters and was passed in 1841, married women were required to follow the nationality status of their spouse. The second national constitution adopted in 1844 distinguished between natives, those born in the nation or who had been in the nation at the time of independence, and those who could naturalize. Naturalization was open to citizens of Central America, foreigners who lived in the country for 3 years if they had a family and 5 years if single, and others who had useful occupations or economic capital. Eligibility also depended upon age, gender, and economic self-sufficiency restrictions. Subsequently, Costa Rica adopted new constitutions in 1847, 1848, 1859, 1869, 1871, and 1917, which did not substantially change the scheme of nationality laid out in the 1844 Constitution. The 1847 Constitution provided for naturalization by marriage to a Costa Rican spouse.

According to the Costa Rican Constitution of 1871 a child born in Costa Rica, who did not have foreign nationality derived from either of its parents, was a national. If a legitimate, legitimized, or legally recognized but illegitimate child was born to a Costa Rican father, either within the territory or abroad, a declaration of choosing Costa Rican nationality filed during the child's minority, or a declaration filed by the child after reaching majority conveyed nationality upon it. A child born to a Costa Rican mother received similar derivative nationality only if it was illegitimate and unrecognized by the father. If the father was a foreigner who later did recognize the child, Costa Rican nationality was lost, unless a declaration of choice was made by the parent during the child's minority or by the child when it reached majority. Between 1882 and 1885, Costa Rica developed a civil code modeled on the Chilean Civil Code of 1857, the Napoleonic Code of 1804, and the Spanish Civil Code of 1851. The 1885 Civil Code required married women to submit to the marital authority of their spouse, including wherever he chose to reside. A mother could only provide nationality or have authority over illegitimate children under the 1885 Civil Code.

Provisions of the Law of Alienship and Naturalization, adopted 13 May 1889, included that a Costa Rican woman married to a foreigner lost her nationality if her husband's nation granted her derivative nationality. It also provided that a foreign woman who married a Costa Rican national automatically derived the nationality of her husband. A foreign wife could not be independently naturalized without her husband; however, a Costa Rican woman could have individual nationality differing from her husband. A woman who had lost her nationality by marriage could repatriate if the marriage terminated. Requirements were that she returned to Costa Rica and declared to officials her intent to reside in the country, renouncing her former nationality. A woman who had gained Costa Rican nationality through marriage could relinquish it if the marriage terminated and she acquired nationality elsewhere. Under the Naturalization Law of 1889, minor children of a foreign father who naturalized, or chose to relinquish Costa Rican nationality, automatically derived his new nationality. Nationality lost in this manner could be regained under the provisions for choosing Costa Rican nationality. A mother was unable to change the nationality of her legitimate children during her marriage.

The Immigration Law of 1942, specifically barred as immigrants to the nation people of African and Asian descent, specifying that Arabs, Armenians, Syrians and Turks were forbidden, as were nomadic people and coolies. In 1949, Costa Rica developed a new constitution which recognized women as eligible for citizenship for the first time. The following year the Options and Naturalizations Act (Spanish: Ley de Opciones y Naturalizaciones) was passed to harmonize domestic law with obligations in conventions and international treaties that Costa Rica had ratified. These changes equalized the provisions for derived citizenship of children from either of their parents. The legislation gave preferential treatment in residency requirements to nationals of the Central American countries, Latin America, and Spain. It had provisions for spouses of Costa Ricans who lost nationality because of marriage to gain Costa Rican nationality and established that nationality could not be changed except by choice. Costa Rica became a signatory to the Inter-American Convention on the Nationality of Women in 1954 and in 1995, adopted Law 7514 (Spanish: Ley N° 7514), which made nationality an inalienable right.
