= 1948 Costa Rican Constituent Assembly election =

- 8 December 1948
- All 45 seats in the National Constituent Assembly; 23 seats needed for a majority
Party	Leader	Vote %	Seats
PUN	Otilio Ulate Blanco	74.16	34
Constitutional	–	12.87	6
Social Democratic	José Figueres Ferrer	7.64	4
National Fellowship	Francisco Vargas Vargas	2.90	1
This lists parties that won seats. See the complete results below.

Constituent Assembly elections were held in Costa Rica on 8 December 1948, following the Costa Rican Civil War. The elections were convened by the Founding Junta of the Second Republic, which was exercising provisional governmental authority in accordance with the Ulate–Figueres Pact. A total of 45 constituent deputies and 15 alternate members were to be elected.

The result was a victory for the National Union Party of president-elect Otilio Ulate Blanco, which won 34 of the 45 seats. The assembly subsequently drafted the 1949 constitution.

== Results ==
Party	Votes	%	Seats
National Union Party	62,300	74.16	34
Constitutional Party	10,815	12.87	6
Social Democratic Party	6,415	7.64	4
National Fellowship Party	2,439	2.90	1
Civic Action Party	844	1.00	0
People's Republican Movement	749	0.89	0
Liberal Party	448	0.53	0
Total	84,010	100.00	45
Registered voters/turnout	176,979	–	
Source: Nohlen
