= Bernarda Vásquez Méndez =

Bernarda Vásquez Méndez (1918 – 6 March 2013) was a Costa Rican feminist who become the first woman to cast the vote in the country on 30 July 1950 after a struggle begun in 1923 by the Liga Feminista Costarricense, the constitution of 1949 granted Costa Rican women the right to vote.

== Personal life ==
Born in La Tigra de San Carlos, she participated in the plebiscite to determine if La Tigra and La Fortuna were still part of the San Carlos canton or would join San Ramón, going down in history as the first Costa Rican woman to vote. It was when she was 27 years old, that she went to the polls to open the door for thousands of Costa Rican women to vote, getting up at 3:00 am to make sure she was the first female voter. One year before, on June 20, 1949, the Constituent Assembly of Costa Rica granted women the right to vote.

From this first vote, she became a faithful activist in the exercise of the vote, inviting Costa Ricans constantly to participate in each electoral fair. She declared once for the newspaper La Nación: "The worst thing that a Costa Rican is to stop voting, because thanks to our political system we have always had peace and tranquility."
