= Constitution of Costa Rica =

Supreme law of Costa Rica

Political Constitution of the Republic of Costa Rica
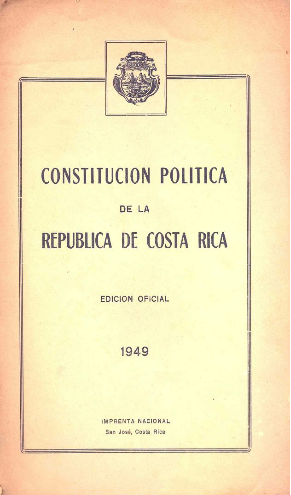

Overview
- Jurisdiction: Republic of Costa Rica
- Created: 7 November 1949
- System: Presidential unitary republic

Government structure
- Branches: 4
- Chambers: Unicameral
- Executive: President
- Judiciary: Supreme and Electoral

History
- First legislature: 8 November 1949
- First executive: 8 November 1949
- Amendments: 17
- Last amended: 2015
- Location: National Museum of Costa Rica
- Commissioned by: Governing Junta
- Author: Constituent Assembly of Costa Rica
- Signatories: All 45 deputies
- Supersedes: Costa Rican Constitution of 1871

The Constitution of Costa Rica is the supreme law of Costa Rica. At the end of the 1948 Costa Rican Civil War, José Figueres Ferrer oversaw the Costa Rican Constitutional Assembly, which drafted the document. It was approved on 7 November 1949. Several older constitutions had been in effect starting from 1812, with the most recent former constitution ratified in 1871. Notably, Article 12 abolished the Costa Rican military, making Costa Rica the second nation after Japan to do so by law. Another notable clause is an amendment asserting the right to live in a healthy natural environment.

== History ==
=== First years of independence ===
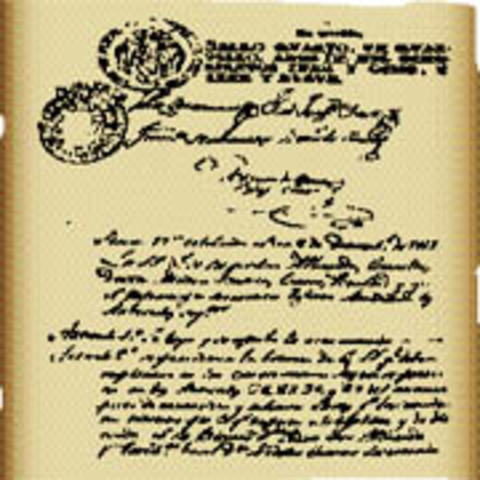
Pact of Concord

The first Constitution ever to be implemented in the Costa Rican territory was the Cadiz Constitution or Spanish Constitution of 1812, which was in place between 1812 and 1814 and then again between 1820 and 1821; however soon after the Independence of Central America the Cadiz Constitution remained by decree of the Towns' Legates Junta which took over power as an interim government in the meantime a new constitutional text was drafted.

The Towns' Legates Junta (or Junta de Legados de los Pueblos) sanctioned the Interim Fundamental Social Pact or Pact of Concord, Costa Rica's first Constitution on 1 December 1821. This Constitution was in force until 1823.

The Provincial Constituent Congress of Costa Rica was convened twice in the then Province of Costa Rica immediately after the independence of Spain. First with the country as a province, at least nominally, part of the First Mexican Empire, and the second as a province of the newly created Federal Republic of Central America. In both cases, it issued legal statutes that acted as provisional local constitutions.

The First Provincial Constituent Congress was convened after the elections of deputies who would represent Costa Rica in the Constituent Congress of Mexico in 1822, but who never held office because it was dissolved by the Emperor Agustín de Iturbide. The Junta Gubernativa decides then to convene a constituent congress to decide the fate of the country divided between republicans willing to succeed and imperialists loyal to Mexico, and this congress issued the First Political Statute of the Province of Costa Rica on 19 March 1823. Which was in force until the outbreak of civil war between monarchists and republicans of that year. After the war, when the Mexican Empire had fallen and Central America had become the United Provinces, another Provincial Congress was convened again by the interim president and leader of the winning Republican side Gregorio José Ramírez, who handed over the power to said body which held it between 16 April and on 10 May 1823. This Congress ratified the power of Ramírez, defined the capital of San José and issued the Second Political Statute of the Province of Costa Rica that temporarily served as a constitution within the Federation of Central America.

=== Federal Republic of Central America ===
From May to November 1824 the Basis of the Federal Constitution was in place in all the Central American countries as part of the Federation: Costa Rica, El Salvador, Guatemala, Honduras and Nicaragua, as a temporary constitution in the meantime the Central American Federal Constituent Assembly drafted the Constitution of the Federal Republic of Central America which was enacted on 22 November 1824 and was in place until the Federation's dissolution in 1838.

=== State of Costa Rica ===
Still part of the Federal Republic, the Constituent Congress of the State of Costa Rica promulgated the Fundamental Law of the State of Costa Rica on 25 January 1825, during the presidency of Juan Rafael Mora Porras. The Fundamental Law was heavily influenced by the Cadiz Constitution. This Constitution would remain active until Costa Rica's departure from the Federal Republic in 1839. On 8 March 1841, dictator Braulio Carrillo Colina enacted the Decree of Basis and Guarantees, which worked as a de facto Constitution on his regime. Carrillo was toppled in April 1842 by the invasion of Honduran general Francisco Morazán, who abolished the Decree on 6 June 1842. The abolition was later confirmed by the Constituent Assembly instituted by Morazán on 24 August 1842.

=== Constituent Assemblies from 1838 to 1870 ===
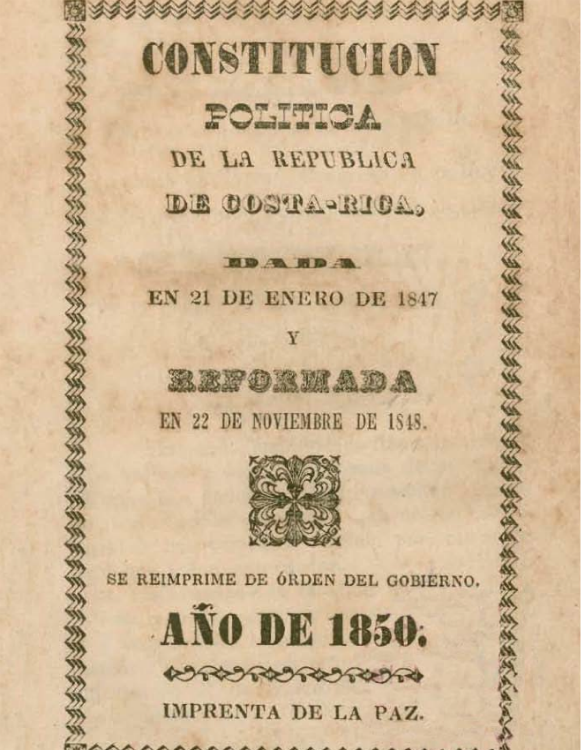
1847 Constitution

From 1838 to 1870, a large number of Constituent Assemblies with a greater or lesser degree of effectiveness, independence or legislative power were raised. As is the custom in Costa Rica, after a rupture of the constitutional order that defenestrates a government, a Constituent Assembly was convened. It legitimized the new government (a custom that was maintained in 1871, 1917 and 1949). During the very unstable second half of the nineteenth century in which there were many coups d'état, the Constitutions proliferated as much as the coups, as well as their Assemblies.

Braulio Carrillo assumes power in Costa Rica as a dictator in 1838 and calls a Constituent Assembly that is suspended indefinitely. Carrillo issues by decree the Law of Bases and Guarantees that operates as a de facto Constitution.

In April 1842 General Francisco Morazán took power in Costa Rica by overthrowing Carrillo and calling a Constituent Assembly in June. This would also have legislative powers, even though they are not specific to a Constituent Power.

Ousted Morazán and elected interim president José María Alfaro, on 5 April 1843, he convened a Constituent Assembly that was officially established on 1 June. This Constituent Assembly would be the second last to assume legislative powers, although it was mostly reduced to ratification of Alfaro's decrees. He drafted the Constitution of 1844, which would leave unhappy the military hierarchy that would overthrow the then ruler, Antonio Pinto Soares who would return power to Alfaro on 7 June 1846.

He reconvenes a Constituent Assembly that would function until 1847, issuing the Constitution of that year. Which would be reformed, again via Constituent, in 1848.

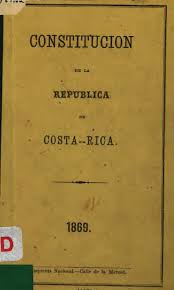
1869 Constitution

Being president José María Montealegre Fernández operated a Constituent Assembly from 16 October to 26 December 1859, which drafted the respective Constitution. The provisional governor José María Montealegre Fernández was elected as constitutional President for the period 1860 to 1863. For the triennium 1863 to 1866, Jesús Jiménez Zamora was elected, and within a few months of being in power he dissolved the Congress, although elections were quickly called to appoint a new one. Jimenez's successor was José María Castro Madriz, elected to the period 1866 to 1869; but Castro's desire to be succeeded by his Secretary of State Julián Volio Llorente provoked great opposition in certain political and military circles. On 1 November 1868, a military coup overthrew the government and broke the constitutional order again. The part of the Constitution of 1859 referred to the Executive Branch was again in effect for a brief period, from August to October 1870.

In 1868, Jesús Jiménez Zamora overthrew José María Castro Madriz, convoking a constituent on 15 November of that year and legislating by decree authoritatively. The Assembly begins functions on 1 January 1869 and based on the Constitution of 1859, would issue on 18 February the Constitution of 1869, which would have an ephemeral duration then, overthrown Jiménez by Tomás Guardia and elected provisional president Bruno Carranza, he convenes a constituent in 1870 that accepts the resignation. The differences between this Assembly and the de facto president Tomás Guardia lead to the abolition of this by Guardia and the convening of a new Assembly in 1871 that drafted the Constitution of that year and the one with the longest duration in history, as it would last (except brief interruptions) until 1949.

=== National Constituent Assembly of 1871 ===
The National Constituent Assembly of 1871 was convoked by the de facto Costa Rican President Tomás Guardia Gutiérrez after annulling the previous Assembly established in May 1870 by his predecessor and political rival Bruno Carranza Ramírez. Guardia called for new elections that selected a total of twenty constituent deputies who drafted the Political Constitution of 1870 strongly influenced by liberal ideas. This Constitution would be the longest lasting in Costa Rican history and would be taken as a basis by the constituents of 1949 to draft the respective Constitution.

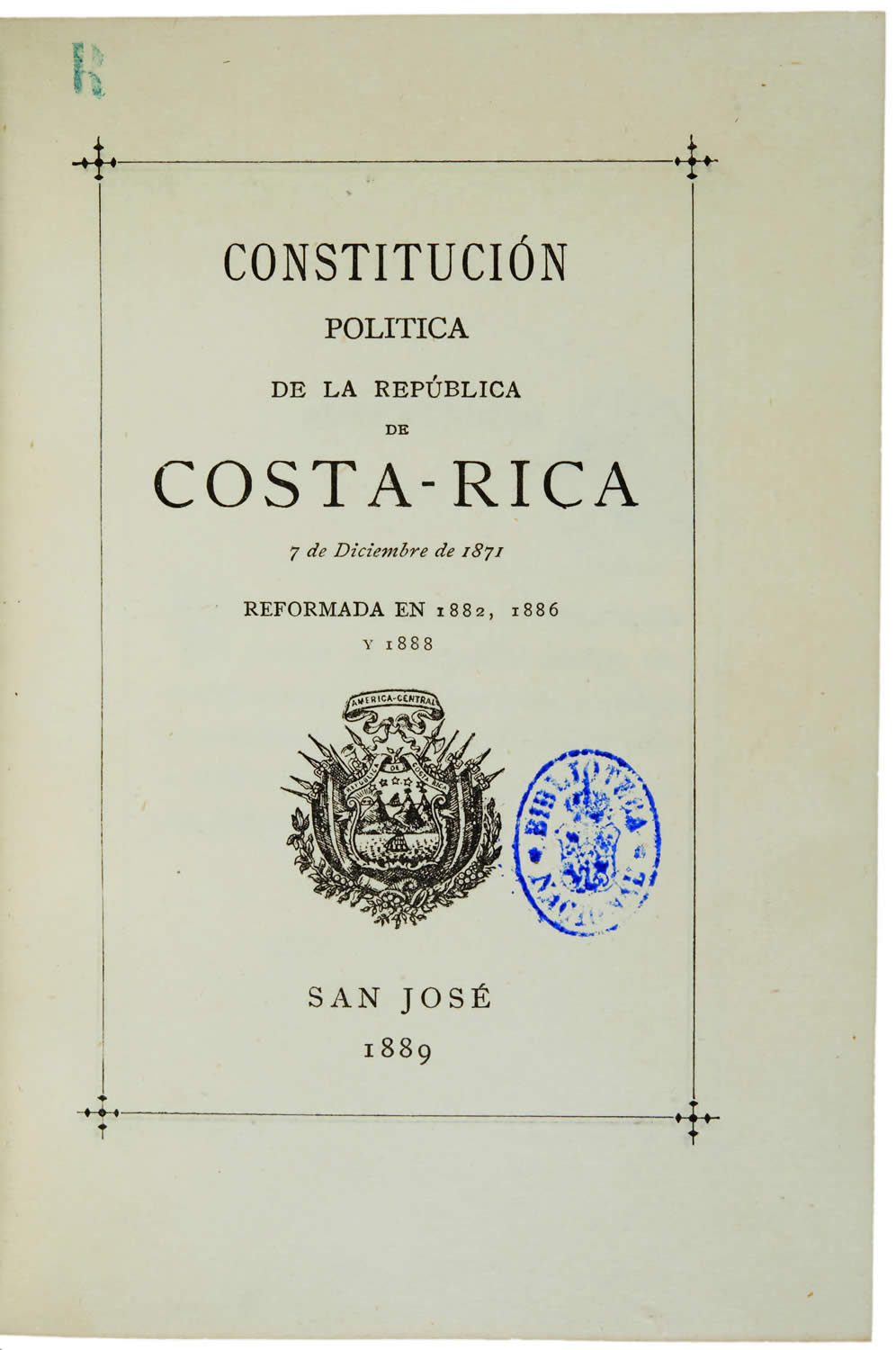
1871 Constitution

=== National Constituent Assembly of 1917 ===
The National Constituent Assembly of 1917 was convoked by the de facto Costa Rican President Federico Alberto Tinoco Granados after gaining power in the 1917 coup d'état in Costa Rica that overthrew Alfredo González Flores. Tinoco sought to legitimize his regime by creating a new model of republic, so the Constitution of 1871 was abolished. The Assembly began sessions on 11 April and ended on 8 June. One of its first decisions was to declare Tinoco the legitimate president of Costa Rica and extend its mandate to six years. It was constituted by 42 deputies who were elected in a rather questionable election where the opposition could not participate. All, except two deputies, belonged to the single party of the regime; the Peliquista Party. Only the deputies Otilio Ulate Blanco and Otto Cortés Fernández had been elected by the "Tinoquista Party".

A commission of former presidents was chosen to draft the 1917 Constitution, and it is considered one of the most reformist in history, although it had a very short life. Among other things, it postulated the duty of the State to protect the working class and created a bicameral Parliament with a Senate and a Chamber of Deputies. It also endowed the population with a large number of civil rights, although more so in the theory that in practice, the Tinoquista regime was exceptionally repressive. In any case, after the overthrow of Tinoco in 1919, the Constitution of 1917 was abolished and restored from that of 1871, it would not be until 1949 that a new Constituent Assembly would be convened that would create another Constitution that would replace, to date, that of 1871.

=== Current ===
The junta led by José Figueres Ferrer took office in Costa Rica on 8 May 1948 under the name of the Founding Junta of the Second Republic, and the same day provisionally reinstated the validity of the national chapters, individual and social rights of the 1871 Constitution. On 3 September 1948, the Junta called for elections for a Constituent Assembly, which opened on 15 January 1949. This Assembly recognized the verified presidential election in favor of Otilio Ulate Blanco and provided that he exercised the presidency from 1949 to 1953.

The Junta appointed a committee of jurists to prepare a draft Constitution. The Constituent Assembly rejected their draft and instead took as a basis for discussion the Constitution of 1871, although in the course of the revisions they admitted some elements of it. On 7 November 1949, the Assembly approved the new constitution, which is currently in force.

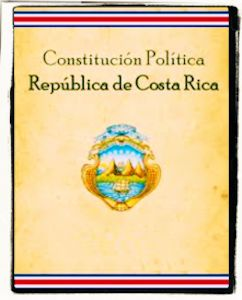
1949 publication

== Summary ==
Its original wording had 199 articles distributed in eighteen titles and 19 transitory articles.

=== Title 1 ===
Declares that the Republic is free and independent, it proclaims that sovereignty resides in the nation, setting the limits of Costa Rican territory and consecrates its sovereignty over the airspace above its territory, territorial waters and constitutional platform. It provides that the government is popular, representative, alternative and responsible and is exercised by the legislative, executive, and judicial branches. It provides that provisions contrary to the Constitution are null and that the Supreme Court can declare the laws and executive decrees unconstitutional. The army as a permanent institution is abolished.

=== Title II ===
Regulates the condition of Costa Rican citizenship by birth or by naturalization.

=== Title III ===
Regulates the situation of foreigners who have the same rights and duties as Costa Ricans, with the exceptions set by the Constitution and laws.

=== Title IV ===
Contains the enunciation of the rights and individual guarantees, including privacy, habeas corpus and the establishment of administrative courts.

=== Title V ===
Refers to the Social Guarantees. It places high importance on family values. It establishes the rights of workers and trade unions.

=== Title VI ===
On the Religion, reproduces unchanged the text of the constitutional reform of 1882 on the subject, noting that the Catholic Church is the official religion and that it contributes to its maintenance, without impeding the exercise of any other worship it is not opposed to universal morality or good customs.

=== Title VII ===
This chapter is devoted to education and culture. In addition to enshrining compulsory primary education, it states that preschool and high school are free. Freedom of private education is guaranteed and it introduces various provisions regarding the University of Costa Rica, the freedom of teaching in higher education and various cultural aims of the Republic.

=== Title VIII ===
Deals with the political rights and duties. The established universal suffrage and direct right of Costa Ricans of either sex and a Supreme Electoral Tribunal was established to organize and conduct the elections, declaring the result of the elections and perform other functions related to the vote. Under his dependence is a Civil Registry. Members of the Court are elected for six years by the Supreme Court by a vote of not less than two thirds of votes of all judges and must meet the requirements for these.

=== Title IX - The Legislative Branch ===
Regulates the Legislative Branch, which holds one house called the Legislative Assembly integrated by 45 Deputies to homeowners and less 15 alternates. Deputies are elected for four years and may be reappointed successively. The Legislature lost some of their traditional, such as those relating to the election authority, but took others, including those to question and give vote of confidence to the Ministers and appoint investigating committees. Its regular sessions were expanded considerably. The Executive may veto a bill to consider it inconvenient or unconstitutional and in the latter case the Supreme Court decides the matter. The Assembly is obliged to consult the Supreme Court, the Supreme Electoral Tribunal and other institutions in the bills relating to them and in some cases requires a qualified majority deviate from their approach.

=== Title X - The Executive Branch ===
Concerns the executive branch exercising the President of the Republic and the Cabinet Ministers, as they subordinate collaborators and are freely appointed and removed by him. President's period of four years and a former president can not be elected again to eight years after completion of his previous period. There are two Vice Presidents of the Republic, who is popularly elected at the same time that the President and replace him in his temporary or permanent absence. The Governing Council composed of the President and the Ministers and has specific functions, such as exercising the right of pardon and appoint and dismiss diplomatic representatives.

=== Title XI - The Judiciary ===
Regulates the judiciary. The Supreme Court justices are appointed by the Legislature for periods of eight years and reelected automatically for equal periods unless otherwise decided by two thirds of Deputies. For the performance of the judiciary is required by law degree and have served the profession for ten years at least.

=== Title XII ===
Refers to the municipal system. It keeps the division into provinces, cantons and districts. In each canton there is a Municipality, popularly elected every four years. Municipal corporations are autonomous.

=== Title XIII ===
Deals with the Treasury and regulates the issuance and execution of budgets and functions of the Comptroller General of the Republic and the National Treasury.

=== Title XIV ===
It regulates the independent institutions that are independent in governance and administration. These include state banks, state insurance institutions and new bodies set up by the Legislative Assembly by a vote of at least two-thirds of its members.

=== Title XV and XVI ===
Regulates the civil service and the oath that all civil servants must observe (to defend the Constitution and laws).

=== Title XVI ===
Refers to the constitutional review. A project that will partially reform the Constitution should be presented in regular session by at least ten deputies. The project requires approval by two-thirds vote of the Assembly and then passed to the Executive. President returns with his observations along with their annual Legislature at its next regular meeting message. The Assembly must pass the amendment by a two-thirds vote of all its members again. The general reform of the Constitution can only be made by a Constituent Assembly convened for that purpose, after complying with the formalities of partial reform.

=== Title XVIII ===
The title refers to the authority of the Constitution and includes transitory articles.

== Reforms since 1949 ==
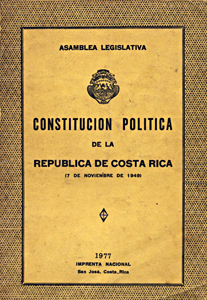
1977 publication

Since it was enacted in 1949, the Constitution has amended many times. Notable amendments include:

- 1954, which increased the number of judges of the Supreme Court.
- 1957, which assigned to the Judiciary sum not less than 6% of the national budget.
- 1958, which removed the gratuity of municipal offices.
- 1959, which established the State's obligation to enroll citizens in the Civil Registry and provide them with identity cards.
- 1961, which set the number of deputies in the Legislative Assembly to fifty-seven, suppressed the institution of alternate deputies and established universal social insurance.
- 1968, which gave international treaties precedence over national law, prohibited discrimination contrary to human dignity, abolished the independence of the autonomous institutions in government and necessitated any general amendments to the constitution to be passed by a Constituent Assembly called by a two-thirds majority in the Legislative Assembly.
- 1969, which prohibited presidential reelection.
- 1971, which lowered the age requirement for civic duties to eighteen years.
- 1971 and 1972, which protected public employees' salaries from being used to pay political debts.
- 1975, which clarified the independence of the branches of government, abolished the ban on forming parties opposed to the democratic system, established Spanish as an official language of the Republic, allowed the President to travel to other Central American countries without legislative authorization, setting a 12-nautical-mile limit on territorial waters and establishing a 200-nautical-mile exclusive economic zone.
- 1984, which abolished the principle that wage increases of Deputies could only govern until after they have ceased to function those who approved.
- 1989, which established the constitutional jurisdiction and attributed to a specialized chamber of the Supreme Court the resolution of constitutionality conflicts.
- 1993, which allowed the existence of standing committees with legislative powers.
- 1994, which established the right to a healthy and ecologically balanced environment.
- 1995, which stated that the quality of Costa Rican citizenship is not lost and can not be waived.
- 2003, which undid the 1969 reform banning presidential reelection.
- 2015, which declared the country to be multiethnic and multicultural.

== Proposed new Constitution ==
Proposals to convene a new Constituent Assembly in Costa Rica to draft a new Political Constitution have been circulating for several years. In 2016, the Supreme Electoral Tribunal authorized the collection of signatures to submit to a referendum the bill that would call a Constituent, although the process was held back by the filing of an amparo appeal before the Constitutional Chamber.

During the Óscar Arias Sánchez administration, the then Minister of the Presidency, his brother Rodrigo Arias, publicly declared that the government was interested in convening a new Constituent Assembly to draft a new Constitution that would reform the State by providing what it qualified as governability. For which it would require the approval of a bill that should have the backing of qualified majority in the Legislative Assembly (38 deputies) and does not require a presidential signature, or via referendum. Arias mentioned to La Nación newspaper in December 2008 the interest of calling a referendum for that purpose and then holding the elections of constituent deputies. However at the end of the Arias administration, such a project was not presented. Other political figures have expressed their support for the convening of a new Constituent Assembly, including the former liberationist candidate Antonio Álvarez Desanti, the mayor of San José Johnny Araya and the former minister, ex-deputy and former president of the National Liberation Party Francisco Antonio Pacheco. In 2016, the New Constitution for Costa Rica Movement was founded by different figures, among them the former liberationists Maureem Clarke, Walter Coto and Álex Solís, the former ambassador to Venezuela and historian Vladimir de la Cruz, the academic Francisco Barahona and the former libertarian deputy Patricia Pérez.

De la Cruz was also a member of the Board of Notables for State Reform, convened by then President Laura Chinchilla and who made several suggestions for state reform. Some of the suggested changes to the constitutional body include:

- Consecutive re-election once for the president.
- Permanent indefinite re-election for deputies (parliamentary career).
- Election of the judges of the Supreme Court independently and not appointed by the Legislative Assembly.
- Increase in the number of deputies to 80.
- Power to the Parliament to apply the vote of no confidence to the Executive in such a way that both presidential and parliamentary elections are held.

On 16 February 2016, representatives of the New Constitution Movement presented a project for the convocation of a new Constituent Assembly.

According to the original text, the Assembly would consist of 45 members, with an equal number of men and women, elected by closed lists of 27 nationals and 18 provincials to be installed on 7 November 2019 and extend for 20 months and draft a Constitution that is in effect by 15 September 2021. They also asked the Supreme Electoral Tribunal for authorization to convene the referendum initiative, however, the Court's decision was to reject the convocation when finding constitutional frictions with the proposal for three main reasons:

- Limits the actions of the constituents to establish that they can not legislate on certain aspects (the original draft stated that certain chapters of the Constitution would be excluded from the discussion), according to the Court's criterion the Constituent Power is absolute and does not allow limits to the actions of the constituents.
- It proposes allowing independent and non-partisan candidacies, something that the current constitution of Costa Rica does not allow since the original text proposed allowing cooperatives, business chambers, unions and professional associations to run candidates as well as citizens without a party. According to the Court, the current Constitution allows only political parties to nominate candidates and any reform has to work under the rules set by the Constitution in place.
- It does not contemplate submitting the constitutional body emanating from the Constituent Assembly to a referendum.

A second version with the objections observed was subsequently presented before the Electoral Tribunal. Now it contemplated 61 deputies, half men and women, and a period of 15 months to discuss the new constitution so that it could enter into force on 15 September 2021. On this occasion, the magistrates approved allowing the collection of signatures. According to the Costa Rican referendum regulation law, the promoters should collect at least 5% of the signatures of the registry, that is, some 167,000 signatures that by law must be collected within a period of nine months. If the signatures are obtained and after the Civil Registry certifies that all are genuine, the referendum would have been held on the first Sunday of July 2019.

However, scholar and researcher at the University of Costa Rica Esperanza Tasies filed a writ of amparo against the ruling of the TSE on Thursday, 16 February 2017.

According to Tasies, the current Constitution only allows for partial reforms of the Constitution, making use of the referendum and not a total reform, which can only be called by legislative act, and also argues that the bill is contradictory because if the referendums on "budgetary, tax, fiscal, monetary, credit, pension, security, approval of loans and contracts or acts of an administrative nature" are not allowed, the reform of the Constitution would address these issues.

Chamber IV of the Supreme Court of Justice sustained Tasies's allegations and declared the proposed referendum unconstitutional, declaring that only the Parliament can convene a Constitutional Assembly.
