= Identity Card (Costa Rica) =

National identity card of Costa Rica

Costa Rican identity card Cédula de identidad
- Type: Identity card
- Issued by: Costa Rica
- Purpose: Proof of Identity
- Valid in: Costa Rica
- Eligibility: Costa Rican citizenship

The Costa Rican identity card (Spanish: cédula de identidad) is a credit card-sized identity document issued to citizens of Costa Rica when they turn 18. The latest version of the card was introduced in late 2025, which added new security features and removed previously displayed private information after complaints were lodged. For the first time, it became available in a digital format which can be downloaded to mobile devices, the Identidad Digital Costarricense (Costa Rican Digital Identity, IDC).

The identity card is mandatory for Costa Rican citizens when they become 18 years old. (Note: Many official sites, such as embassies in other countries and even the TSE itself state "over 18", but it is clear that what is meant is "18 or over", as shown by the quotes in two of the references.) It is valid for 10 years.

== Physical card ==
It remains the same size as its predecessor, 85.60 by 53.98 millimetres (3.370 in × 2.125 in), to meet the ISO 7810 ID-1 standard. It is made of polycarbonate for improved durability and has color laser engraving.

New security features have been added. Whereas the previous version had a single photograph, this version has a second, smaller version of it to meet the standards of the International Civil Aviation Organization. The barcode has been replaced with MRZ technology to make it compatible with automated verification systems. Microtext has been added that is nearly invisible without magnification. It has embossed text, as well as components that are only visible under ultraviolet light. The letters TSE (for Tribunal Supremo de Elecciones de Costa Rica [Supreme Electoral Court of Costa Rica]) are written in Braille.

In response to complaints, the address (for voting purposes) of the bearer and the names of their parents were removed.

== Digital version ==
The Identidad Digital Costarricense (Costa Rican Digital Identity) can be downloaded onto mobile devices such as smartphones and used in place of the physical card. However, it cannot be used as identification for voting and is only valid for four years.
