= Eugenia Zamora =

Costa Rican jurist and public official (born 1957)

Eugenia Zamora Chavarría
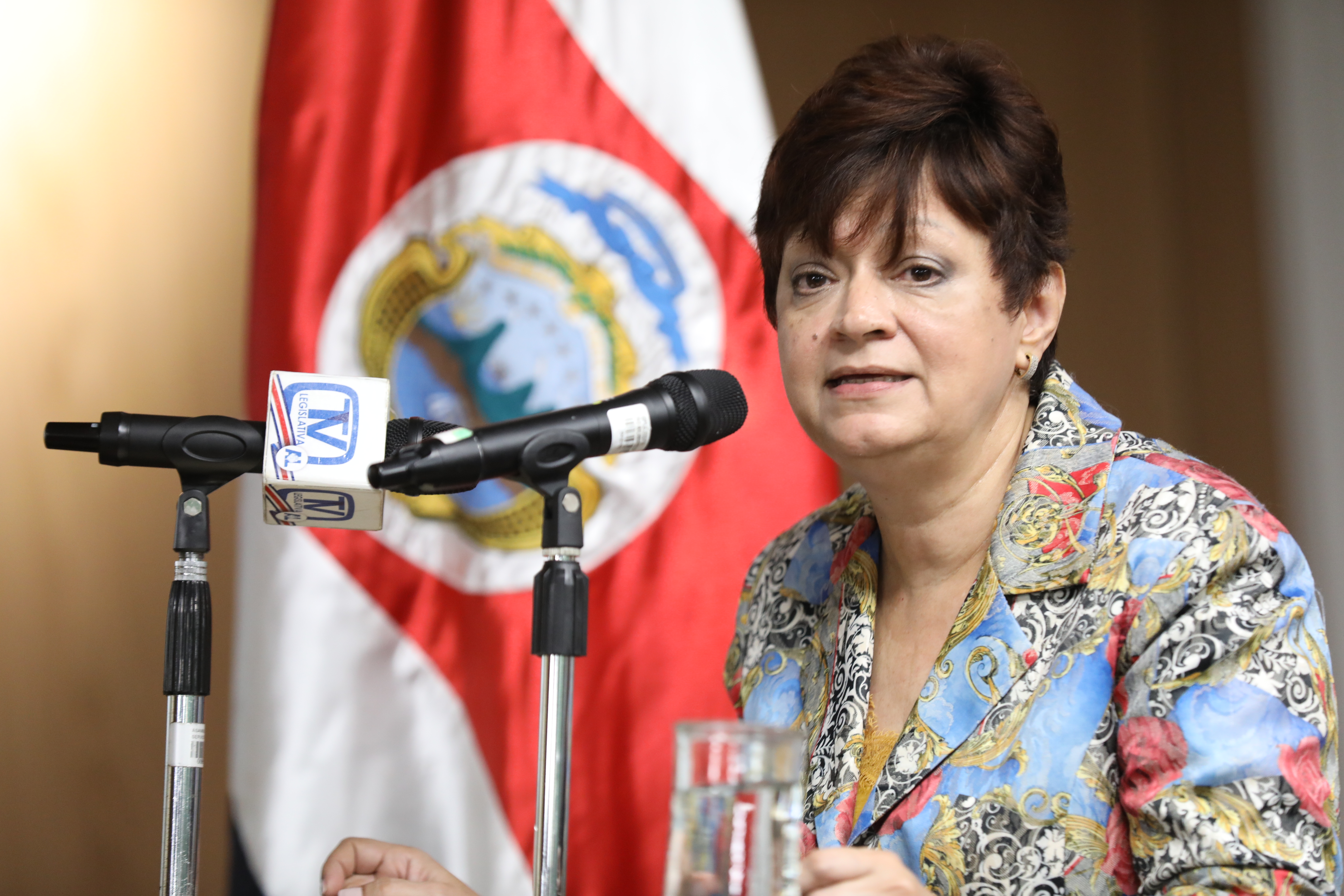
- Zamora in 2023

President of the Supreme Electoral Court of Costa Rica
- Incumbent
- Assumed office 16 December 2021
- Preceded by: Luis Antonio Sobrado González

Vice President of the Supreme Electoral Court of Costa Rica
- In office 3 September 2009 – 16 December 2021
- President: Luis Antonio Sobrado González
- Succeeded by: Max Esquivel Faerron

Magistrate of the Supreme Electoral Court of Costa Rica
- Incumbent
- Assumed office 7 September 2005
- Preceded by: Olga Nidia Fallas Madrigal

Personal details
- Born: Eugenia María Zamora Chavarría; 25 May 1957 (age 69) San José, Costa Rica
- Spouse: Jorge Quartino Croce (m. 1986; died 2000)
- Children: 2
- Education: University of Costa Rica (LLB); Harvard University (LL.M.)

Eugenia María Zamora Chavarría (born 25 May 1957) is a Costa Rican jurist and public official who has served as President of the Supreme Electoral Court since 2021, the first woman to have held the office. She has served as a magistrate of the court since 2005 and previously served as its vice president from 2009 to 2021.

== Early life and education ==
Zamora was born in San José, Costa Rica on 25 May 1957. She completed her primary education at Colegio Nuestra Señora de La Asunción in San Isidro de El General in 1969 and her secondary education at Colegio de Nuestra Señora de Sión in San José in 1974.

She studied law at the University of Costa Rica, graduating with a degree in public law in 1982. In 1983, she obtained a Master of Laws from Harvard Law School on a Fulbright scholarship. She received a qualification as a notary public from the University of Costa Rica in 1985.

== Professional career ==
Zamora began her professional career as a clerk in the Foreign Department of the Banco de Costa Rica, where she worked from 1975 to 1976. In 1980, she worked as an adviser in the External Financing Department of the Ministry of Finance. She subsequently worked as a legal assistant at the law firm Daremblum y Asociados in 1982 and as an associate protection officer with the United Nations High Commissioner for Refugees in Mexico from November 1983 to April 1985.

From 1985 to 1987, Zamora held several positions in the Costa Rican government. She served as User Ombudsman at the National Registry from April 1985 to February 1986 and as a consultant for a judicial administration project operated by the United Nations Latin American Institute for the Prevention of Crime and the Treatment of Offenders (ILANUD) and Florida International University. From May 1986 to September 1987, she served as Vice Minister of Justice and Grace and President of the National Commission for Children at Social Risk under President Óscar Arias Sánchez. She subsequently served as Director of the Office of the President of Costa Rica from September 1987 to October 1988.

From October 1988 to January 1996, Zamora was Director-General of the Inter-American Children's Institute, a specialized agency of the Organization of American States based in Uruguay.

After returning to Costa Rica, she served as an assistant to the Presidency of the Supreme Court of Justice in from February to August 2003. She subsequently worked as a consultant for the Arias Foundation for Peace and Human Progress from August 2003 to August 2005, coordinating its Peace and Human Security area, and served on the board of directors of the Costa Rican Housing Mortgage Bank (BANHVI) from June 2004 to August 2005.

== Supreme Electoral Court (2005–present) ==
Zamora was appointed a magistrate of the Supreme Electoral Court of Costa Rica on 5 September 2005. She was subsequently reappointed for successive terms. She served as vice president of the court from September 2009 to December 2021.

Following the resignation of President of the Supreme Electoral Court Luis Antonio Sobrado González, Zamora was unanimously elected president of the court on 16 December 2021, becoming the first woman to hold the position. On 19 December 2024, she was re-elected as president for the 2025–2027 term.

After the polls closed and before the results were announced of the 2026 general election, Zamora highlighted citizen participation in a civic day and said that "those who tried to discredit this Court and damage the trust that our people have always had in its electoral processes" had failed. She called for reconciliation, responsibility and an end to violent, and stigmatising rhetoric.

== Academic career and publications ==
Zamora began her academic career at the University of Costa Rica, where she worked as a teaching and research assistant in the Faculty of Law from 1979 to 1982. She subsequently taught Roman law at the university in 1982 and constitutional and administrative law in 1986. She also taught constitutional law at the Autonomous University of Central America from 1985 to 1986.

While studying at Harvard Law School, Zamora worked as a research assistant on a course concerning law, politics, and revolution in Latin America, with a focus on constitutional rights and the structure of political power in the region. Her master's thesis at Harvard examined foreign public investment in Costa Rica. Her undergraduate law thesis at the University of Costa Rica concerned the general rules governing the country's ordinary budget. During her tenure as Director-General of the Inter-American Children's Institute, she contributed to publications concerning children's rights, refugee children, and the implementation of the Convention on the Rights of the Child.

Zamora has published and contributed to works on constitutional and electoral law, democracy, human rights, children's rights, and women's political participation. Her publications on Costa Rican electoral politics have addressed the historical development of women's political rights, gender parity and alternation in electoral lists, women's access to electoral justice, and municipal elections. She has also written on constitutional and electoral institutions, including the relationship between gender equality and electoral law.
