= First Political Statute of the Province of Costa Rica =

The First Political Statute of the Province of Costa Rica was issued on 19 March 1823 by the newly independent provisional government and replaced the Pact of Concord as its Political Constitution.

On 31 January 1821, the Superior Governing Junta that ruled the country provisionally held elections to elect the deputies who would represent it before the First Mexican Empire's Constituent Congress of 1822 of that would draft the Constitution of the Mexican Empire of which it was a part, at least in theory. But the Congress was dissolved by Emperor Agustín de Iturbide before the Costa Rican delegation could leave and the rebuff increased the differences between the imperialists loyal to Iturbide and the Republicans who wanted full independence. The second Superior Governing Junta was elected, which governed from 1 January to 14 March 1823 and was chaired by José Santos Lombardo y Alvarado and the Provincial Constituent Congress of Costa Rica was convened, which dictates the First Political Statute of the Province of Costa Rica on 17 March and replacing the Pact of Concord.

The Statute established a triple government confirmed by a triumvirate with a Republican representative, a monarchical representative and an independent or neutral representative. The Rev. Rafael Francisco Osejo presided over the Triumvirate. The Statute also created the figure of a Congress of Representatives without specifying the nature, conformation or mode of election, granting it the right to choose the independence of the Province or its annexation to any of the American powers.

The Statute would work until the rebellion of the monarchist Joaquín de Oreamuno y Muñoz de la Trinidad on 29 March 1823, when it was abolished by the first Civil War in Costa Rica, which would be rendered useless as by its end the Iturbide Empire had fallen.
