= Confederación de Trabajadores de Costa Rica =

Trade union centre in Costa Rica

CTCR
- Confederación de Trabajadores de Costa Rica
- Headquarters: San José, Costa Rica
- Location: Costa Rica
- Affiliations: WFTU

The Confederación de Trabajadores de Costa Rica (CTCR) is a trade union centre in Costa Rica.

It is affiliated with the World Federation of Trade Unions.
