= Second Political Statute of the Province of Costa Rica =

The Second Political Statute of the Province of Costa Rica established a governing junta and parliament in Costa Rica in 1823.

== History ==
The statute was issued on 16 May 1823 by the interim government and the Second Provincial Congress of the Province of Costa Rica. It was issued just after the Ochomogo War when the monarchist camp settled in Cartago and Heredia. Headed by Joaquín de Oreamuno was defeated by the Republican side commanded by Gregorio José Ramírez and gravitated around San José and Alajuela.

Ramírez defeated Oreamuno on 5 April at the battle of Ochomogo. He assumed power until 16 April when he handed it over to a Constituent Congress. The Congress held it between 16 April and 10 May 1823, presided over by José María de Peralta y La Vega. This Congress confirmed Ramírez as General Commander in Arms, imposed the seat of government in San José and promulgated the Second Political Statute that it marked as a Constitution.

The statute remained in force from May 1823 to November 1824, when the Basis of Federal Constitution became effective.

== Provisions ==
This Statute created a Governmental Superior Junta of five tenure and two alternates members and prescribed a bicameral Parliament that appointed a Political Chief, a Mayor and a General Commander of Arms. The two chambers of Parliament were an Assembly of Representatives and a Representative Council both of popular election.

The first initiated laws, exercised fiscal authority and construction of infrastructure. The second functioned as a high chamber with power to sanction laws, advise the Executive Branch, commission appointments and act as a court of ethics for civil servants.
