= Costa Rican Constitution of 1844 =

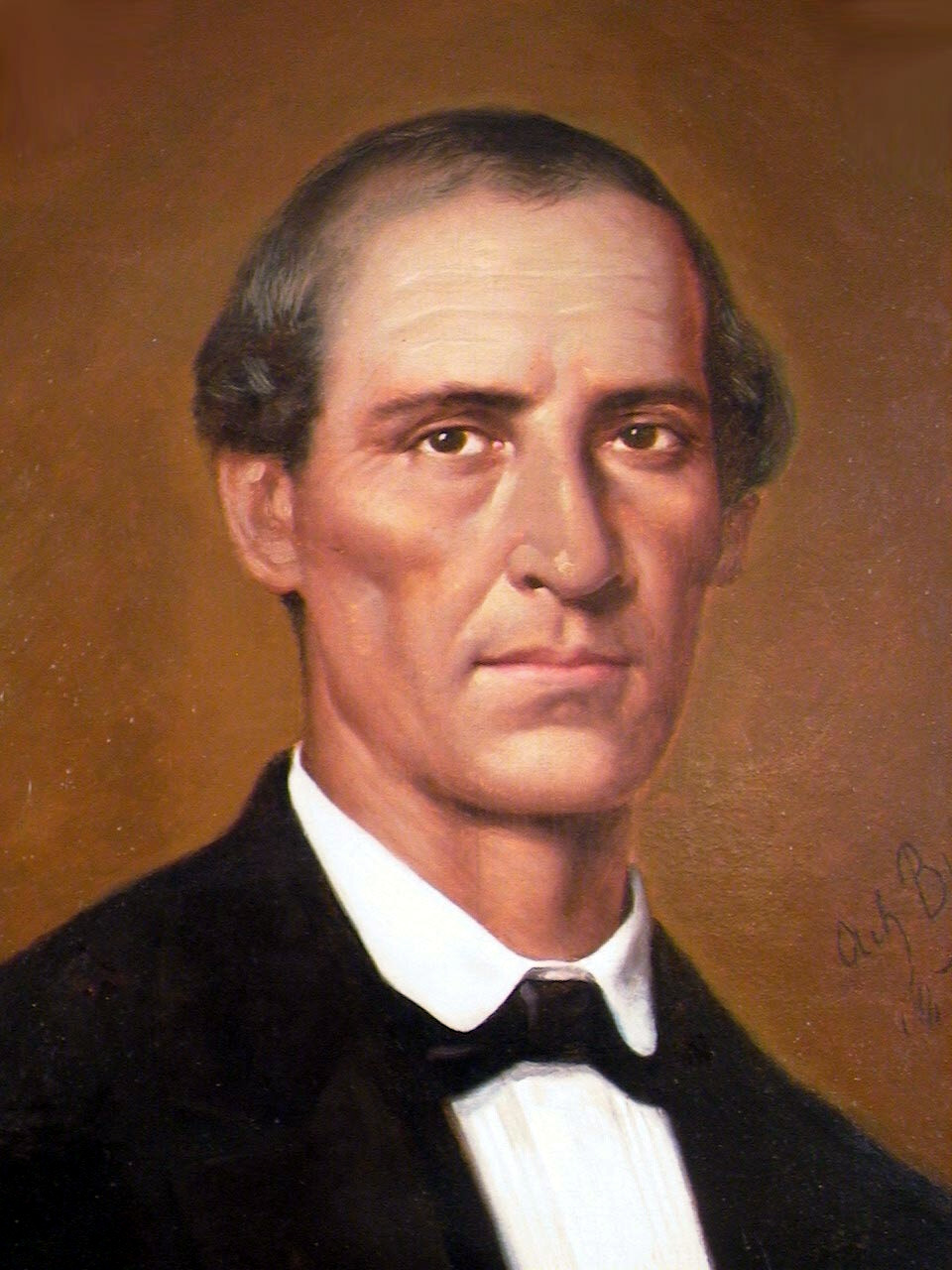
José María Alfaro Zamora

The Political Constitution of the Free State of Costa Rica promulgated on 9 April 1844 was the second constitution of the country, if local constitutions are excluded when it was a member of the Central American Federation, and eight if these are included. Francisco Morazán's regime was toppled by José María Alfaro Zamora. Zamora as interim ruler, on 5 April 1843, convened a Constitutional Assembly that was officially established on 1 June of that year and drafted the Constitution that would be in force until 1847 when, Alfaro again, summons a new Constituent.

It was the first constitution to expressly establish ministries, these were; of Office, of Interior, Foreign and Interior Relations and of Treasury and War. Although it does not specified its functions. The Legislative Branch was bicameral and the Head of State will be replaced by the President of the Senate in case of death, illness or destitution. The constitution held that the Head of State would be elected through direct elections.

It also institutes the San Juan de Dios Hospital and its Charity Board that would eventually be transformed into the Social Protection Board. It also establishes education as a right of Costa Ricans and as a duty of the State to grant it by putting all the means at its disposal to provide it.

The dissatisfaction with the Constitution of 1844 by the military led to the coup of 1846 and this in turn to the drafting of the "corrected" Constitution of 1847.
