= Decree of Basis and Guarantees =

De facto constitution of Costa Rica from 1841 to 1842

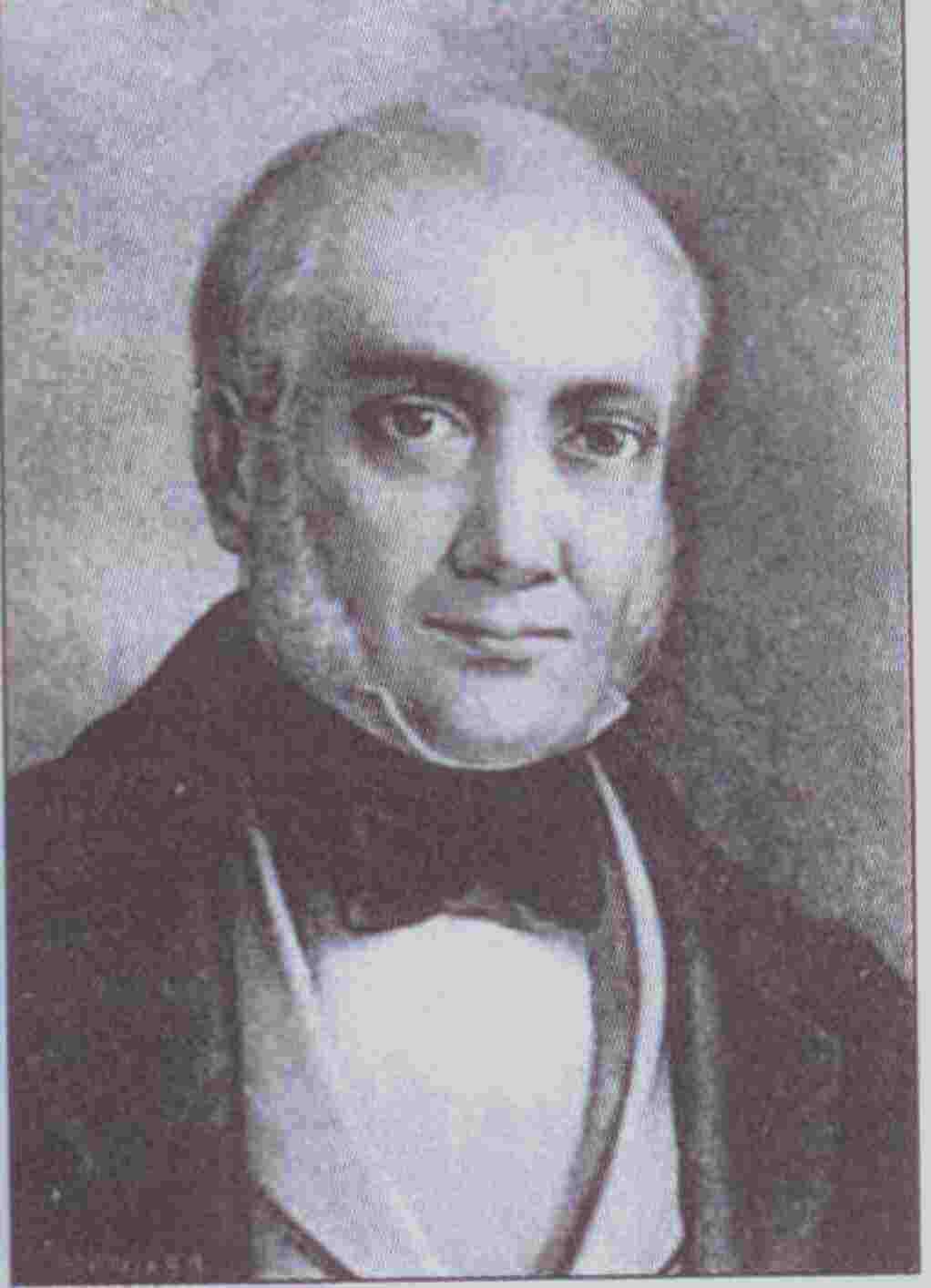
Braulio Carrillo Colina

The Decree of Bases and Guarantees was the de facto constitutional text of Costa Rica, granted on 8 March 1841 by the Head of State Braulio Carrillo Colina.

== History ==
In 1841, with the intention of giving some juridical support to his authoritarian regime that had been established since 1838, Carrillo Colina decided to issue a fundamental statute of his own making what would fulfill a similar role to that of the Constitution. On March 8 of that year, Carrillo issued the so-called Decree of Bases and Guarantees, which represented a constitutional consecration of absolutism.

The text of the Decree, instead of conforming to the constitutional model used since 1812 (titles, chapters or sections and articles) did not have a running numbering, but was divided into seven extensive articles, subdivided in turn into paragraphs numbered independently, in the style of the American Constitution of 1787 and the French Constitution of 1791.

The Decree proclaimed that Costa Rica was a sovereign and independent State, both in its internal administration and in its foreign relations, and made no allusion to the Central American union. It also enshrined several of the major civil and political rights of the liberal tradition.

The constitutional text of 1841 departed from the classic tripartite branches and concentrated all branches in the First Head of State, who was immovable and not subject to responsibility. The First Head would presided over a Consultative Chamber of five members (one for each province), elected by census and indirect suffrage in four grades, and whose agreement was necessary to issue and interpret codes, ordinances and general regulations, declare war and make peace, set the budget, impose taxes, negotiate loans and other matters.

The General State Ministry was in fact Second Head of State, elected by census and indirect suffrage in four grades and substituted the First Head in case of death or incapacity. A Judicial Chamber of five members, elected by the First Head of the three candidates proposed by each Province, acted as supreme court. Its members had to have legal education and remained in their positions while their good performance lasted.

In each of the Provinces (Alajuela, Cartago, Guanacaste, Heredia and San José) there was a Political Chief appointed by the First Head. The municipalities were abolished altogether.

The Decree of Bases and Guarantees did not mention the procedure for its reform, so it could be assumed that the constitutional review would be carried out using the prescribed for the issuance of codes, ordinances and general regulations, that is, through an agreement between the First Head and the Consultative Chamber. This would make it possible to conceptualize the Decree as a flexible constitutional text.

The Decree of Bases and Guarantees was in force for a very short period, since in April 1842 the invasion of General Francisco Morazán overthrew the institutionalized dictatorship of Carrillo and the constitutional order was broken. Initially Morazán kept the Decree for some purposes, but on 6 June 1842 declared it void, a decision confirmed on 24 August of that same year by a Constituent Assembly. This put in force again, provisionally and in the adaptable, the Fundamental Law of the State of Costa Rica of 1825.
