= Constituent Assembly of Costa Rica =

National Constituent Assembly Asamblea Nacional Constituyente
- Costa Rica

Type
- Type: Unicameral

History
- Established: January 15, 1949
- Disbanded: November 7, 1949
- Succeeded by: Legislative Assembly

Structure
- Seats: 45
- Political groups: PUN (34); PC (6); PSD (4); CN (1)

Meeting place
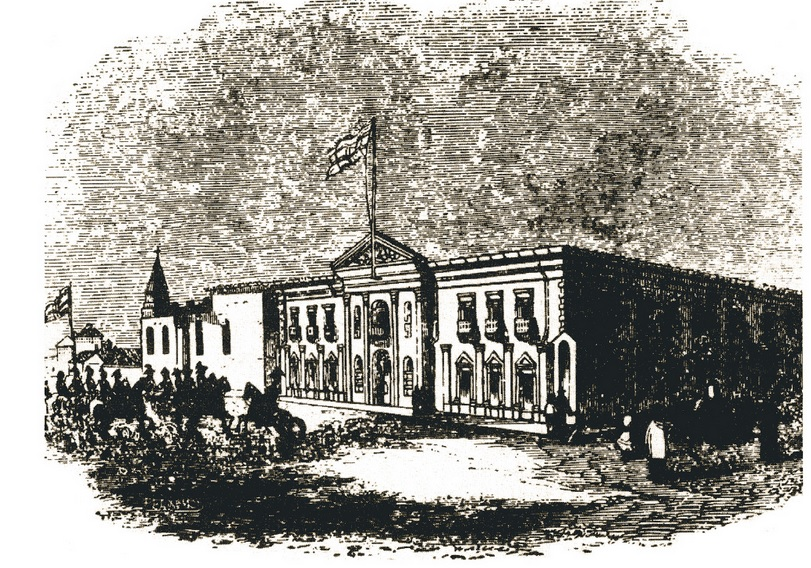
- National Palace

Costa Rica’s National Constituent Assembly was formed after the 1948 civil war. Elections to the Assembly for a New Constitution were called on December 8, 1948 by the then de facto Junta provisional government presided by José Figueres. The Assembly took place between January 15 and November 7, 1949. The Assembly successfully drafted and approved the current Costa Rican Constitution.

Women were not allow to vote or be elected for any of the 45 seats, as women's voting was still not legal (the 1949 Constitution subsequently gave women the right to vote and be elected). Also, due to the recent civil war, the parties of the losing side, mainly the Republicans (Calderonistas) and the Communists were outlawed. Nevertheless, a party named National Constitutional Party led by constitutional experts and lawyers that in many cases were relatives of Republican leaders was allowed to participate and was the second more voted party, according to some historians, thanks to the Republican vote, albeit Republican leader in exile Rafael Ángel Calderón Guardia called for abstention.

The most voted party was president-elect Otilio Ulate’s party National Union (PUN). The party achieved a landslide victory with 74% of the vote and 34 of 45 seats. Yet, even when the party was loosely liberal as Ulate himself, most historians agree that PUN's Assemblymen didn't share much ideological or programmatic coherence other than being Ulatistas.

The third largest party in the Assembly was the Social Democratic Party led by then de facto ruler and victorious leader of the civil war José Figueres. Unlike the other parties, the Social Democrats had a coherent ideology and political philosophy to follow, and even though it had very few seats (only 4) their members were very influential thanks to their intellectual weight, including among other future president Luis Alberto Monge and notorious academic Rodrigo Facio. The fourth party was National Fellowship, a left-wing Guanacastecan independence party led by physician Francisco Vargas.

A special committee was appointed by the Assembly to draft a Constitution. Among the committee members were Facio, jurist Fernando Baudrit Solera and other notorious intellectuals. They made a very progressive Constitution for the time, yet the Assembly's plenary finally disregarded the draft and took the 1871 Constitution as the basis of the new one.
