= Costa Rican Civil War =

1948 conflict in Costa Rica

- Part of the Cold War
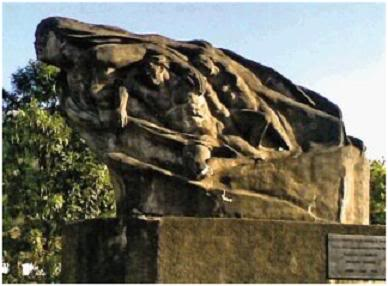
- Monument in memory of those who died in the Civil War of 1948, located in Ernesto Zumbado park in Santa María de Dota.
| Date | 12 March – 24 April 1948 (1 month, 1 week and 5 days) |
| Location | Costa Rica |
| Result | Rebel victory: Overthrow of authoritarian president Teodoro Picado Michalski; Installation of a provisional government led by transitional president José Figueres Ferrer; Costa Rican military abolished after nearly half a century of its establishment; Constitutional assembly is elected; A new Constitution is created and enacted; Provisional government transfers power to Otilio Ulate |

Belligerents
| National Liberation Army; Ulatista Forces; Caribbean Legion; Supported by: Guatemala; United States | Government of Costa Rica; Calderon forces People's Vanguard Party; Nicaraguan National Guard |

Commanders and leaders
| José Figueres Ferrer; Frank Marshall Jiménez; Otilio Ulate Blanco | Teodoro Picado Michalski; Rafael Calderón; Manuel Mora; Anastasio Somoza |

Casualties and losses
- Approx. 2,000 killed

The Costa Rican Civil War, domestically referred to as the War of '48 or the Revolution of '48 (Spanish: Guerra del 48; Revolución del 48), took place from 12 March to 24 April 1948. The conflict followed the presidential elections of 8 February 1948, in which opposition candidate Otilio Ulate defeated the ruling party's Rafael Ángel Calderón Guardia. The pro-government representatives who dominated the Legislative Assembly alleged that Ulate's victory was fraudulent, and on 1 March, the legislature voted to annul the results of the election. This triggered an armed uprising led by José Figueres Ferrer, a businessman who had not participated in the elections, against the government of President Teodoro Picado.

The uprising was resisted by the small, ill-equipped Costa Rican army and, more significantly, by the militias of the Communist People's Vanguard Party, which was part of the governing coalition in the Legislative Assembly and had voted to annul the presidential elections. Figueres' rebels rapidly defeated the government forces and their Communist allies, forcing President Picado to step down and leave the country along with former president Calderón Guardia. About 2,000 people are believed to have died during the war, making it the bloodiest event in 20th-century Costa Rican history.

After the war, Figueres toppled the army and ruled the country for 18 months as head of a provisional government junta, which oversaw the election of a Constitutional Assembly in December. That Assembly adopted the new 1949 constitution, after which the junta was dissolved and power was handed to Ulate as the new constitutional president.

Costa Rica has since experienced some unrest, but no political violence reaching the severity of the civil war.

== Background ==
In the 1940s, the Costa Rican political scene came to be dominated by Rafael Ángel Calderón, a medical doctor who served as President of Costa Rica from 1940 to 1944. The Constitution forbade consecutive reelection, so for the 1944 elections, Calderón's National Republican Party nominated Teodoro Picado, a law professor who was perceived as a weak figure controlled by Calderón.

The Picado administration resorted several times to military force to keep the peace, and pro-Calderón elements within the military institution often become involved in street violence, which helped to sully the image of the military in the minds of the people. The Costa Rican communist movement, organized in the Popular Vanguard Party led by congressman Manuel Mora, was allied to Picado's government and contributed to the unrest by deploying its militia against the opposition. As the violence grew, supporters of the opposition began to carry guns, and the police began to threaten the use of firearms rather than just beating demonstrators.

Disgust with the government's violent reprisals against the opposition led to the Huelga de Brazos Caídos, a strike that stalled commerce in Costa Rica for seven days. Pro-Calderón and communist demonstrators began to sack businesses that participated in the strike; Picado's government intimidated participating merchants and professionals and threatened workers with dismissal and military service. By the end of the strike, police and military forces patrolled the streets, and San José appeared as if under siege.

Calderón returned as the ruling party's candidate for the election of 1948 and there were widespread fears that the government would intervene to ensure his triumph against his main opponent, journalist Otilio Ulate. To assuage these fears, Picado's government for the first time in Costa Rican history placed the election under the control of an independent electoral tribunal.

== Figueres and the Caribbean Legion ==
José Figueres, a Costa Rican businessman, had been forced into exile in Mexico on April 12, 1942, after he strongly criticized the Calderón regime during a radio broadcast. Figueres returned to Costa Rica after the election of Picado. Before the elections of 1948, Figueres had already been planning for a war. Unlike Ulate, former president León Cortés, and the other members of the Costa Rican opposition, Figueres believed that Calderón would never allow a fair election to take place.

Figueres began training the Caribbean Legion, an irregular force of 700. Hoping to use Costa Rica as a base, the Legion planned to move against other authoritarian governments in Middle America. U.S. officials followed the Legion's activities with concern, especially after Figueres carried out terrorist attacks inside Costa Rica during 1945 and 1946 that were meant to incite a general strike. The people did not respond.

== 1948 elections and violent aftermath ==
After a highly contentious electoral process plagued by violence and irregularities concluded on February 8, 1948, the independent electoral tribunal, by a split vote of 2 to 1, declared that opposition candidate Otilio Ulate of the National Union Party, had been elected president. The ruling party's Calderón claimed that this result had been obtained by fraud and petitioned Congress, where the coalition of his own party and the Popular Vanguard Party held a majority, to void the results and call for a new election. When Congress granted this request, the country erupted in chaos, as both sides accused the other of vote tampering and electoral fraud.

On the day that the government annulled the elections, police surrounded the home of Dr. Carlos Luis Valverde, the acting campaign manager for Union National, where Ulate was and Figueres had been only moments before. Shots rang out, and Valverde fell dead on his doorstep. Ulate escaped but was later captured and imprisoned, all of which helped to paint an especially distasteful image of the military.

== Beginning of civil war ==
The annulment of the election results in 1948 and the killing of Valverde on the same day seemed to give Figueres the evidence that he needed that the government had no intention of peacefully accepting the popular will, thus justifying a violent insurrection. On March 11, Figueres made the call that brought in the arms and military leaders he needed for a successful military campaign. On March 12, his National Liberation Army exchanged fire with government forces, and the war began.

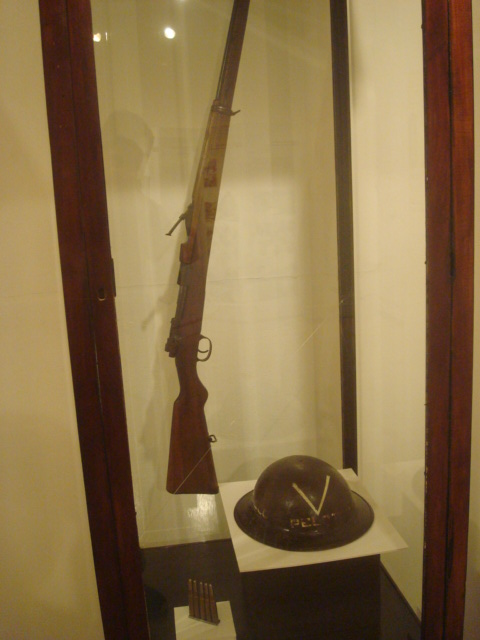
Rifle and helmet used during the Costa Rican civil war of 1948. Temporary exhibition in the National Museum of Costa Rica.

== Ideological context ==
Costa Rican politics have traditionally been guided by personal allegiances far more than by ideological consistency, and the Civil War of 1948 provides a striking example of this. Calderón had been elected president in 1940 as the candidate of the right, closely allied with the Roman Catholic Church and with the business elite, but his enthusiastic support for the Allies during World War II, and especially his punitive measures against the rich and influential German community in Costa Rica, caused that elite to withdraw its support for him.

Calderón then created a different political base by allying himself with the Costa Rican communists (the Popular Vanguard Party), led by Manuel Mora, and with the socially progressive Catholic Archbishop of San José, Víctor Manuel Sanabria, in order to pass legislation guaranteeing labor rights and establishing a welfare state. Mora's communist militias provided important armed support for the government, both during the tense years of Picado's administration (1944–48) and during the Civil War itself.

The rebel forces led by Figueres were a mix of anti-communist right-wingers, economically conservative elements weary of the welfare state (represented by the winner of the 1948 election himself, Otilio Ulate), and a social democratic intelligentsia which sought to strengthen the new welfare state while ensuring democratic transparency. After their victory this alliance quickly fell apart. The right-wing faction, led by the junta's Minister of Public Safety, Édgar Cardona, attempted to overthrow Figueres and was excluded from the government thereafter. Figueres himself became closely identified with the social democratic faction, which later dominated his own National Liberation Party (PLN). The economically conservative groups under Ulate ended up allying themselves in the 1950s with Calderón's supporters to form a broad anti-PLN coalition.

This lack of ideological consistency is further underscored by the fact that during the Civil War, the government forces, despite being allied to the Costa Rican communists, enjoyed the support of right-wing Nicaraguan dictator Anastasio Somoza, while Figueres's rebels, who as anti-communists were tacitly supported by the United States, received significant aid from leftist Guatemalan president Juan José Arévalo.

== Fall of Cartago ==
The National Liberation Army, as the rebel army called itself, slowly worked their way up the Pan American Highway, capturing small but important cities and ports with relative ease. The official army, which was then led by Picado's brother, was unable to organize an effective resistance to Figueres' National Liberation Army. Figueres also contended against the communist militias commanded by congressman Carlos Luis Fallas and against Nicaraguan soldiers who had been sent by Somoza to help the government retain power.

In Cartago, Costa Rica's second-largest city, located only 12 miles from the capital, Figueres' forces met considerable military opposition; however, the limited forces and supplies of the governmental forces quickly ran out, and Cartago was captured by the rebels on April 12. Costa Rican President Picado, realizing that defeat was inevitable, sent notice to Figueres that he was willing to compromise.

Picado's long-time political ally, Manuel Mora of the communist Popular Vanguard Party, had no intention of negotiating with Figueres. Mora's forces had sealed themselves up inside the capital of San José, and were determined not to capitulate as quickly as Picado. As the target of many of Figueres' criticisms about Costa Rica, Mora and his party were worried that a Figueres-led takeover might well lead to their expulsion from politics.

== Surrender of Picado ==
The day after the fall of Cartago, Picado—low on supplies and without any other source of support—sent a letter to Mora and Calderón stating that "the attempt to hold San José would be futile and catastrophic." Faced with the prospect of an urban battle for San José, Mora decided to withdraw at Picado’s request.

On April 19, Picado and Father Benjamín Núñez, an eminent labor leader within Costa Rica, signed the so-called Pact of the Mexican Embassy, ending the armed uprising. Picado resigned the next day, leaving Santos León Herrera as interim president. Picado and former president Calderón Guardia went into exile in Nicaragua. On 24 April, Figueres' forces entered San José, almost six weeks after beginning their revolt in southern Costa Rica. On 8 May the provisional junta presided by Figueres formally took over the government.
