= 1966 Costa Rican general election =

- 6 February 1966
- Presidential election
- Registered: 554,627
- Turnout: 81.40% (▲0.53pp)
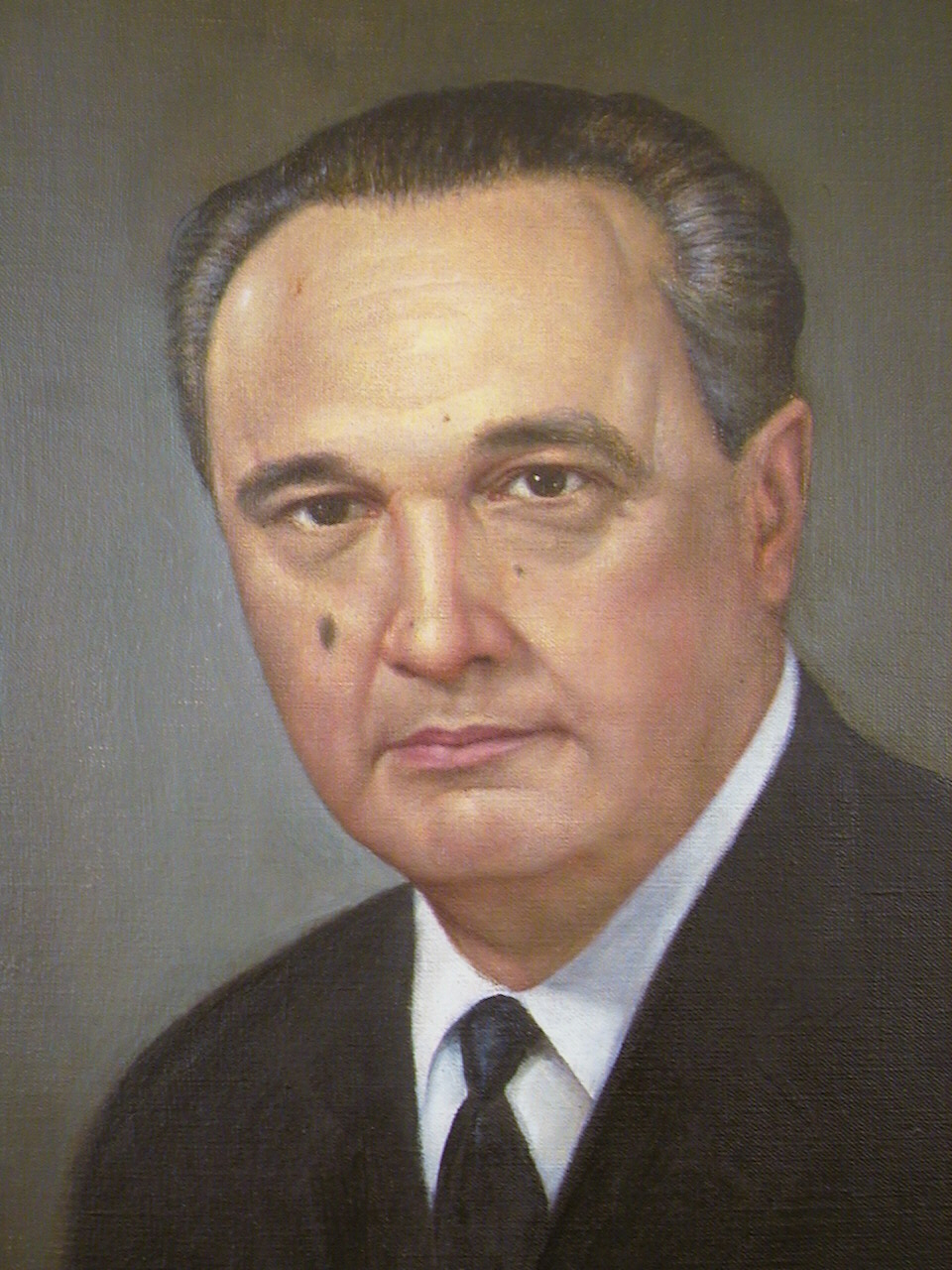

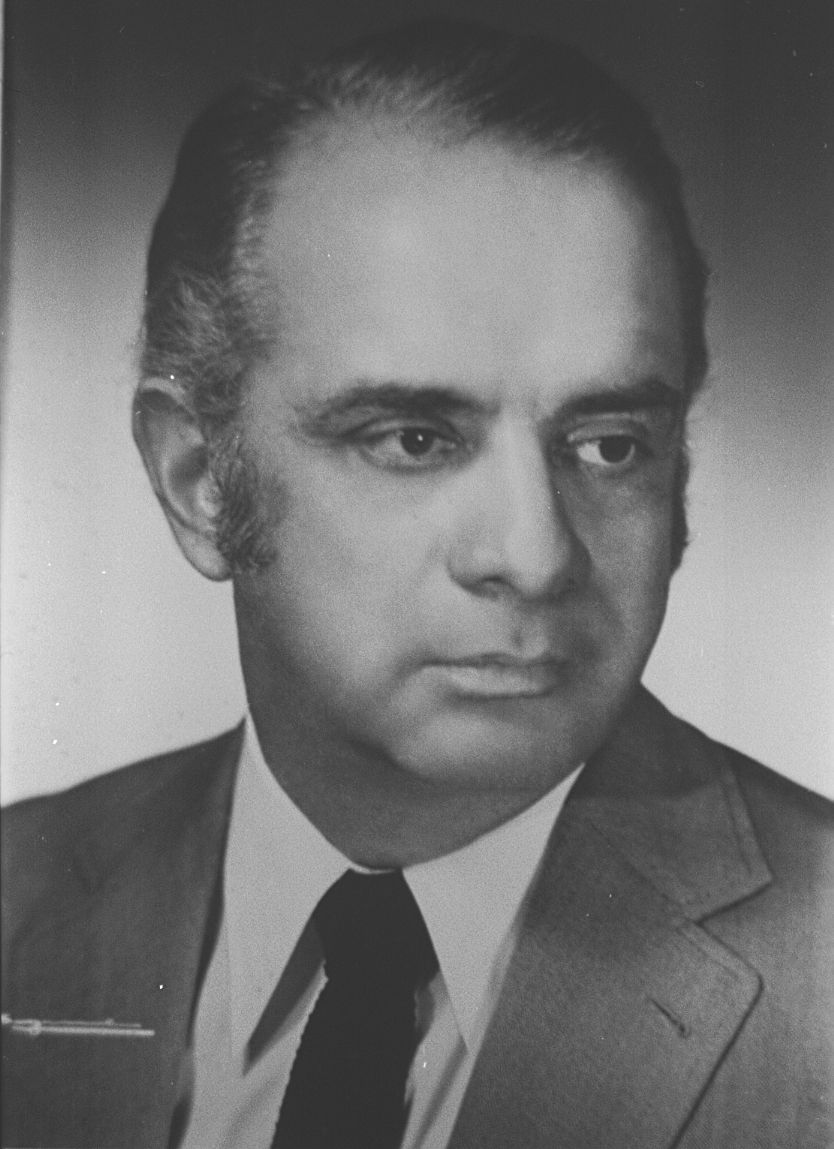
| Nominee | José Joaquín Trejos | Daniel Oduber |
| Party | UN | PLN |
| Running mate | Jorge Vega; Virgilio Calvo | Manuel Aguilar; Claudio Alpízar |
| Popular vote | 222,810 | 218,590 |
| Percentage | 50.48% | 49.52% |
- Results by district Trejos: 50–60% 60–70% 70-80% Oduber: 50–60% 60–70% 70-80% 80-90% 90-100% Tie: 50%
President before election
Francisco Orlich
PLN
Elected President
José Joaquín Trejos
UN
- Legislative election
- All 57 seats in the Legislative Assembly; 29 seats needed for a majority
- Turnout: 81.40% (▲0.53pp)
| Party | Leader | Vote % | Seats | +/– |
|---|---|---|---|---|
| PLN | Daniel Oduber Quirós | 48.93 | 29 | 0 |
| UN | José Joaquín Trejos Fernández | 43.16 | 26 | New |
| UCR | Frank Marshall Jiménez | 5.48 | 2 | New |
This lists parties that won seats. See the complete results below.
Results by province

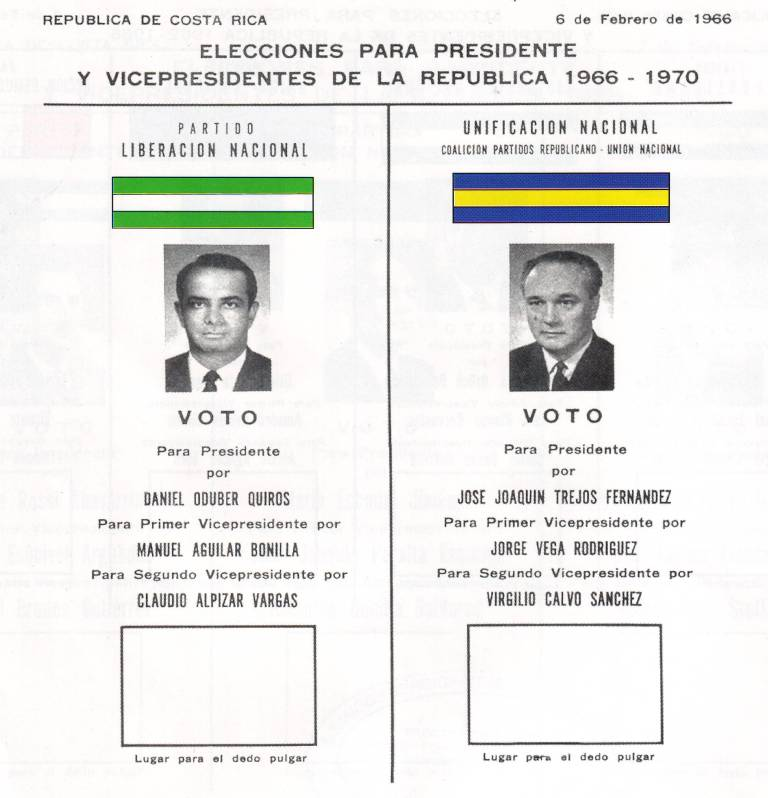
Ballot paper

General elections were held in Costa Rica on 6 February 1966. José Joaquín Trejos Fernández of the National Unification Party narrowly won the presidential election, whilst the National Liberation Party won the parliamentary election. Voter turnout was 81%.

These were very divisive elections as they had only two candidates. On one hand the government party PLN nominated the Minister of Foreign Affairs Daniel Oduber Quirós, whilst all the right-wing opposition joined forces and former enemies Rafael Calderón and his National Republican Party (Social Christian) merged with Otilio Ulate’s National Union (Liberal-Conservative) in the National Unification Party. Calderón and Ulate were enemies during the 1948 Civil War but put aside their differences and they agree that none of them will be candidate.

The National Unification Party look forward a “neutral” candidate that could unified the opposition and college professor and economist José Joaquín Trejos was selected. Trejos had never hold a public office before.

Left-wing opposition was outlawed as the Legislative Assembly made effective the article 98 of Costa Rica's Constitution at the time that forbid Communist parties, making illegal the only party at the left of PLN, the Popular Democratic Action (PADA) led by Manuel Mora.

The campaign was particularly ideological, as the two candidates were basically encompassing the only Right-Left options and were defenders of two very different ideologies; Oduber (and PLN) abide to democratic socialism and Trejos was conservative. The debate centered on both opposing philosophies; Trejos accused PLN of statism and been smothering the private enterprise, whilst Oduber accused Trejos of being supported by the richest of the rich and trying to bring down Costa Rica's social justice and labor laws.

In one of the most hard-fought elections in Costa Rica's history, Trejos won by a small difference of around 2000 votes (one of Costa Rica's slightest differences between two candidates), though PLN kept its parliamentary majority (thus many of Trejos’ reforms did not passed). Far-right Revolutionary Civic Union Party won two seats in Parliament. The results were accepted by all sides and many historians seem this election as the evidence that the dark times of civil unrest and conflict after electoral processes that end in the Civil War were put behind for good.

== Results ==
=== President ===
| Candidate | Party | Votes | % |
|---|---|---|---|
| José Joaquín Trejos Fernández | National Unification Party | 222,810 | 50.48 |
| Daniel Oduber Quirós | National Liberation Party | 218,590 | 49.52 |
| Total | | 441,400 | 100.00 |
| Valid votes | | 441,400 | 97.77 |
| Invalid votes | | 6,265 | 1.39 |
| Blank votes | | 3,825 | 0.85 |
| Total votes | | 451,490 | 100.00 |
| Registered voters/turnout | | 554,627 | 81.40 |
Source: Election Resources

==== By province ====
| Province | Trejos % | Oduber % |
|---|---|---|
| San José | 49.7 | 50.3 |
| Alajuela | 51.4 | 48.9 |
| Cartago | 48.6 | 51.4 |
| Heredia | 51.2 | 48.8 |
| Puntarenas | 55.7 | 44.3 |
| Limón | 54.7 | 45.3 |
| Guanacaste | 48.0 | 52.0 |
| Total | 50.5 | 49.5 |

=== Legislative Assembly ===
| Party | Votes | % | Seats | +/– |
|---|---|---|---|---|
| National Liberation Party | 202,891 | 48.93 | 29 | 0 |
| National Unification Party | 178,953 | 43.16 | 26 | New |
| Revolutionary Civic Union | 22,721 | 5.48 | 2 | New |
| Democratic Party | 8,543 | 2.06 | 0 | New |
| Guanacastecan Republican Party | 1,529 | 0.37 | 0 | New |
| Total | 414,637 | 100.00 | 57 | 0 |
| Valid votes | 414,637 | 91.84 | | |
| Invalid votes | 28,748 | 6.37 | | |
| Blank votes | 8,090 | 1.79 | | |
| Total votes | 451,475 | 100.00 | | |
| Registered voters/turnout | 554,627 | 81.40 | | |
Source: Election Resources

==== By province ====
| Province | PLN | | UN | | UCR | | PD | | PRG | |
| Province | % | S | % | S | % | S | % | S | % | S |
|---|---|---|---|---|---|---|---|---|---|---|
| San José | 49.4 | 10 | 42.3 | 9 | 7.2 | 2 | 1.1 | 0 | - | - |
| Alajuela | 49.2 | 5 | 44.6 | 5 | 3.1 | 0 | 3.1 | 0 | - | - |
| Cartago | 49.7 | 4 | 39.5 | 3 | 5.4 | 0 | 5.4 | 0 | - | - |
| Heredia | 49.0 | 2 | 46.1 | 1 | 2.8 | 0 | 2.0 | 0 | - | - |
| Puntarenas | 44.2 | 3 | 50.5 | 4 | 4.1 | 0 | 1.3 | 0 | - | - |
| Limón | 44.5 | 2 | 44.4 | 1 | 7.8 | 0 | 3.4 | 0 | - | - |
| Guanacaste | 51.5 | 3 | 38.8 | 3 | 5.5 | 0 | 0.3 | 0 | 3.9 | 0 |
| Total | 48.9 | 29 | 43.2 | 26 | 5.5 | 2 | 2.1 | 0 | 0.4 | 0 |

=== Local governments ===
| Party | Votes | % | Seats | | | |
| Party | Votes | % | Alderpeople | +/– | Municipal syndics | +/– |
|---|---|---|---|---|---|---|
| National Liberation Party | 207,876 | 49.32 | 152 | 4 | 202 | –78 |
| National Unification Party | 195,092 | 46.29 | 140 | New | 132 | New |
| Revolutionary Civic Union | 13,918 | 3.30 | 1 | New | 0 | New |
| Democratic Party | 2,809 | 0.67 | 0 | New | 0 | New |
| Guanacastecan Republican Party | 1,335 | 0.32 | 0 | New | 0 | New |
| Palmarenean Democratic Front | 451 | 0.11 | 0 | New | 0 | New |
| Total | 421,481 | 100.00 | 293 | +18 | 334 | +10 |
| Valid votes | 421,481 | 93.39 | | | | |
| Invalid/blank votes | 29,846 | 6.61 | | | | |
| Total votes | 451,327 | 100.00 | | | | |
| Registered voters/turnout | 554,627 | 81.37 | | | | |
Source: TSE
