= 1944 Costa Rican general election =

- 13 February 1944
- Presidential election
- Registered: 163,100
- Turnout: 83.88% (▲3.03pp)
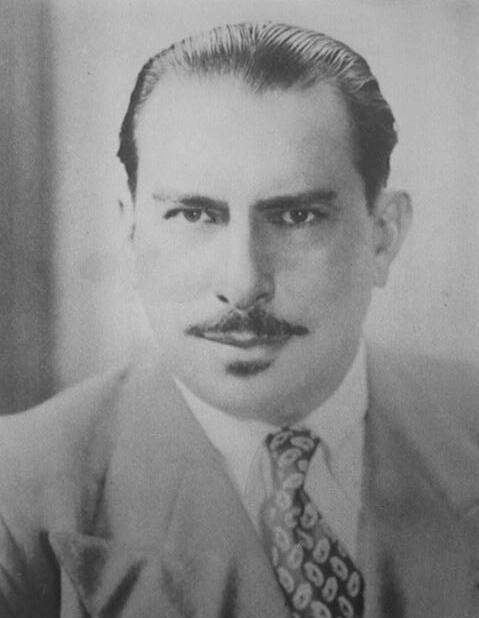

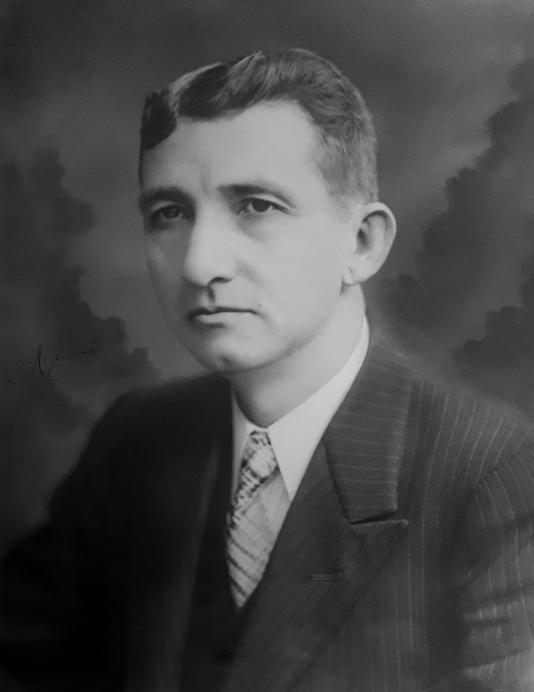
Nominee	Teodoro Picado Michalski	León Cortés Castro
Party	PRN	Democratic
Alliance	Victory Bloc
Popular vote	90,403	46,403
Percentage	66.08%	33.92%
- Official results by province
President before election
Rafael Ángel Calderón Guardia
PRN
Elected President
Teodoro Picado Michalski
PRN
- Legislative election
- 23 of the 45 seats in the Constitutional Congress
Party	Leader	Seats	+/–
PRN	Teodoro Picado Michalski	11	−2
Democratic	León Cortés Castro	9	+5
PVP	Manuel Mora Valverde	3	−1
This lists parties that won seats. See the complete results below.
Results by province

General elections were held in Costa Rica on 13 February 1944 to elect the president and half of the Constitutional Congress. Teodoro Picado Michalski of the Victory Bloc won the presidential election with 66% of the vote. Voter turnout was 84%.

Although the National Republican Party lost the two-thirds supermajority it had held in Congress since 1936, it retained an absolute majority on its own and, together with its new ally, the People's Vanguard Party, could theoretically still command a two-thirds supermajority.

== Background ==
Teodoro Picado Michalski, a serving deputy and President of Congress since 1941, was officially nominated as the presidential candidate of the ruling National Republican Party on 2 May 1942, two years prior to the election.

Communist leader Manuel Mora, who had been himself re-elected a deputy in the mid-term elections of 1942, was approached by businessman Jorge Hine Saborío, who was rumored to be a potential candidate of the right-wing opposition in the upcoming election. Hine allegedly sought Mora’s participation in a coup d’état being planned by conservative sectors against President Rafael Ángel Calderón Guardia. Mora declined to participate, and the plot was neither carried out nor did Hine ultimately run as a candidate.

At the same time, Mora and the Communist leadership were engaged in negotiations with the government and the Catholic Church, represented by Bishop Víctor Manuel Sanabria Martínez. As part of an effort to improve relations with the Church, the Communist Party formally dissolved itself and was reorganized under the name People's Vanguard Party. When consulted by Mora regarding whether Catholics could legitimately join the new party, Sanabria reportedly stated that, having reviewed its program of government, Catholics faced no moral impediment to supporting it.

The opposition nominated former president León Cortés Castro, once a political ally and mentor of Calderón Guardia, whom he had supported during the 1940 election but with whom he later became a political adversary. Cortés’s alleged fascist sympathies became a central issue during the campaign, particularly as Costa Rica had been officially at war with Nazi Germany and the Axis powers since 1941. This context probably contributed to the alignment between Calderón’s supporters and the Communists, consistent with the Popular Front strategy promoted internationally to oppose fascism.

Cortés received backing from conservative economic elites and business groups, including sectors associated with Hine, while Picado’s candidacy was supported by the popular base of Calderonism, organized labor aligned with the Communist movement, and sectors of the Catholic Church, particularly under the leadership of Monsignor Sanabria.

== Campaign ==
The electoral campaign was marked by heightened political polarization and rising tensions between the government and the opposition. Violent incidents and acts described as terrorism were attributed to supporters of both sides during the campaign period.

The ruling National Republican Party centered its campaign on the social reforms implemented under the administration of President Rafael Ángel Calderón, who strongly supported Picado’s candidacy. Government supporters pledged to expand these reforms and warned that a victory by León Cortés would result in their dismantling, arguing that Cortés was backed by conservative and oligarchic sectors. Accusations of fascist sympathies against Cortés remained a recurring theme in pro-government rhetoric.

Cortés, for his part, sought to distance himself from such accusations and emphasized promises of administrative efficiency and governmental reform. Opposition groups, including the Democratic Party, accused the government of political persecution, alleging the closure of opposition media outlets and the disruption of their political rallies. Communist leader Manuel Mora also claimed that supporters of Cortés had threatened him and carried out attacks against members of his movement.

Electoral violence resulted in several fatalities, including one person killed in Sabanilla and three in Llano Grande. Three days after celebrations of Picado’s electoral victory, supporters of the ruling coalition announced the prospective presidential candidacy of President Calderón Guardia for the 1948 election.

== Results ==
=== President ===
Candidate	Party	Votes	%
Teodoro Picado Michalski	National Republican Party	90,403	66.08
León Cortés Castro	Democratic Party	46,403	33.92
Total		136,806	100.00
Valid votes		136,806	100.00
Invalid/blank votes		0	0.00
Total votes		136,806	100.00
Registered voters/turnout		163,100	83.88
Source: TSE

=== Constitutional Congress ===
Party	Seats	+/–
National Republican Party	11	–2
Democratic Party	9	+5
People's Vanguard Party	3	–1
Total	23	–
Source: Obregón
