= Antonio Peña Chavarría =

Costa Rican physician and politician (1899–1986)

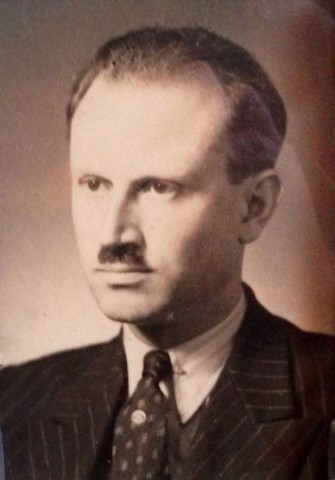
- Peña in 1962

Deputy of the Legislative Assembly of Costa Rica
- In office 1 May 1962 – 30 April 1966
- Preceded by: Florentino Castro Monge
- Succeeded by: Manuel Antonio Mata Morales
- Constituency: San José (16th Office)
- In office 1 November 1949 – 30 October 1953
- Preceded by: Office established
- Succeeded by: Francisco Orlich Bolmarcich
- Constituency: San José (1st Office)

Deputy of the Constitutional Congress
- In office 1 May 1946 – 30 April 1948
- Constituency: San José Province

Secretary of Public Health and Social Protection
- In office 8 May 1936 – 15 March 1939
- President: León Cortés Castro
- Preceded by: Solón Nuñez Frutos
- Succeeded by: Alfonso Acosta Guzmán

Personal details
- Born: José Antonio de la Trinidad Peña Chavarría; 20 May 1899 San José, Costa Rica
- Died: 31 May 1986 (aged 87)
- Party: PUN
- Other political affiliations: Democratic (1946; 1953); PRN (before 1946)
- Education: National University of Colombia (MBBS); Johns Hopkins University
- Occupation: Physician; surgeon; politician; professor

José Antonio de la Trinidad Peña Chavarría (20 May 1899 – 31 May 1986) was a Costa Rican physician, academic and politician. One of the country's leading medical figures during the first half of the 20th century, he contributed to the study of tropical diseases and public health, served as Secretary of Public Health and Social Protection from 1936 to 1939, and was the first dean of the Faculty of Medicine of the University of Costa Rica from 1958 to 1961.

Born in 1899 in San José, Peña studied Medicine at the National University of Colombia and later specialized in public health at Johns Hopkins University in the United States. He became one of Costa Rica's foremost authorities on tropical medicine and dermatology, publishing numerous studies on the relationship between climatic conditions and the spread of infectious diseases, including measles, whooping cough, and diphtheria. His work earned him international recognition in the field of tropical diseases and helped establish Costa Rica as a center for medical research and training in Central America.

In 1931, Peña organized the first medical congresses held in Costa Rica, helping to promote scientific exchange among physicians and researchers. He subsequently served as president of the Faculty of Medicine, then an independent professional institution, until January 1936. During his tenure, the faculty inaugurated its new headquarters, at a time when the country did not yet have a university-based medical school.

Peña later served as Secretary of Public Health and Social Protection from May 1936 to March 1939 under President León Cortés Castro. In that capacity, he oversaw public health initiatives and disease prevention programs. He also served as director of San Juan de Dios Hospital until 1962 and participated in medical research through the International Center for Medical Research and Training (ICMRT).

In 1937, Peña formally proposed the establishment of a new medical school in Costa Rica, becoming one of the earliest advocates for domestic medical education. The University of Costa Rica's School of Medicine was subsequently created on 25 August 1947 by an act of the Constitutional Congress. Peña later joined its academic staff and, following the reorganization of the school into the larger Faculty of Medicine, became its first dean, serving from 1958 to 1961.

In public life, Peña was elected deputy for San José to the Constitutional Congress in 1946 with the Democratic Party, and later to the first Legislative Assembly established under the 1949 Constitution, serving from 1949 to 1953. He later ran as the Democratic Party's candidate for Second Vice President in the 1953 general election on the ticket headed by Fernando Castro Cervantes, although the party was unsuccessful.

After leaving elected office, he continued his medical, academic, and research activities, returning to the Assembly in the 1962 election with the National Union Party.

Peña died on 31 May 1986 at the age of 87. In recognition of his contributions to public health and medical education, the University of Costa Rica established a commemorative unit in his honor in October 1993. The university described him as "one of the founders of modern medicine" in Costa Rica and highlighted his lifelong commitment to the training of physicians and the development of medical education in the country.
