= National Compaction =

Political coalition in Costa Rica

National Compaction Movement Movimiento de Compactación Nacional
- Leaders: Otilio Ulate Blanco; Fernando Castro Cervantes; José Figueres Ferrer
- Secretary-General: Mario Echandi Jiménez
- Founded: 13 February 1947; 79 years ago
- Dissolved: 1 March 1948; 78 years ago (de facto)
- Ideology: Anti-calderonism; Anti-communism; Factions: Economic liberalism Social conservatism Social democracy Democratic socialism
- Political position: Centre-right
- Member parties: PUN; PD; PSD
- Colours: Blue; White
- Constitutional Congress (1948): 18 / 46

Party flag

The National Compaction Movement (Spanish: Movimiento de Compactación Nacional; CN), also called the National Opposition, was a Costa Rican electoral coalition formed by the National Union Party, the Democratic Party, and the Social Democratic Party to contest the 1948 general election. Established in 1947, the coalition united the principal opposition forces against the governing Victory Bloc, whose presidential candidate was former president Rafael Ángel Calderón Guardia.

The coalition nominated journalist Otilio Ulate Blanco as its presidential candidate and won the presidential election of 1948. However, the results were annulled by the Constitutional Congress, an action that contributed to the outbreak of the Costa Rican Civil War. Although the alliance ceased to function following the crisis of 1948, a small political party bearing the name National Compaction existed between 1949 and 1952.

== History ==
The origins of the National Compaction Movement lay in the efforts of Costa Rica's opposition parties to unite against the governments associated with Calderonism. Following former president León Cortés Castro's break with the National Republican Party in 1943, the opposition was largely organized around his Democratic Party, a conservative and anti-communist political organization that drew significant support from agricultural and business elites.

After Cortés's sudden death in March 1946, leadership of the Democratic Party passed to rancher and businessman Fernando Castro Cervantes. At the same time, the National Union Party emerged as an increasingly influential opposition force under journalist and former deputy Otilio Ulate Blanco, whose newspaper El Diario de Costa Rica became a prominent critic of the Calderón Administration and its alliance with the communist People's Vanguard Party.

A third opposition force, the Social Democratic Party (PSD), was founded in 1945 by former members of the Democratic Party's Democratic Action faction and the Center for the Study of National Problems (CEPN). Led by figures such as José Figueres Ferrer, Francisco Orlich Bolmarcich, Alberto Martén Chavarría, and Rodrigo Facio, the PSD advocated democratic socialism and political reform while supporting many of the social reforms enacted during the Calderón and Picado administrations.

Negotiations among the three parties began in January 1946 with the aim of presenting a unified opposition candidacy for the 1948 election. An agreement was finally reached in January 1947, establishing the National Compaction Movement as a common electoral front. On 13 February 1947, the alliance held the National Convention of the Opposition at the National Stadium in San José. More than two thousand delegates participated in the convention, which selected the coalition's presidential nominee. After three rounds of voting, Otilio Ulate Blanco of the National Union Party secured the nomination over Fernando Castro Cervantes and José Figueres Ferrer.

Although the coalition adopted a common political platform, it was never formally registered as a separate electoral entity. Instead, it used the National Union Party's legal registration to nominate candidates for the presidency, Congress, and municipal offices. Figueres Ferrer, whose supporters within the PSD had been decisive in securing Ulate's nomination, initially served as campaign manager for the coalition, while PUN member Mario Echandi Jiménez acted as its secretary-general.

Between 21 July and 3 August 1947, the alliance organized the Huelga de Brazos Caídos ("Sit-Down Strike"), a nationwide protest against the government. The strike involved the closure of businesses, schools, and other institutions and demonstrated the growing strength of the opposition movement.

In the 1948 general election, Ulate won the presidency with 55.3% of the vote. However, the coalition failed to secure a majority in Congress, winning only 18 seats compared to the 28 seats obtained by the governing Victory Bloc.

The National Compaction Movement effectively ceased to function on 1 March 1948, when the Constitutional Congress annulled the presidential election results while allowing the legislative results to stand. The congressional decision precipitated the Costa Rican Civil War, which lasted from 12 March to 24 April 1948. Following the victory of the National Liberation Army under Figueres, Ulate's electoral victory was ultimately recognized under the terms of the Ulate–Figueres Pact, and he assumed the presidency on 8 November 1949.

A small political party registered under the name National Compaction continued to exist between 13 August 1949 and 13 May 1952, although it did not play a significant role in national politics.

== Ideology ==
The National Compaction Movement was a broad electoral coalition rather than a unified ideological party. Its constituent organizations ranged from conservative and liberal conservative sectors represented by the Democratic and National Union parties to the social democratic and democratic socialist tendencies of the Social Democratic Party. Despite these differences, the coalition was united by its outspoken opposition to Calderonism, communism, and the governing Victory Bloc.

== Electoral performance ==
=== Presidential ===
| Election | Candidate | First round | % | Position | Result |
|---|---|---|---|---|---|
| 1948 | Otilio Ulate Blanco | 54,931 | 55.28% | 1st | Won |

=== Parliamentary ===
| Election | Leader | Votes | % | Seats | +/– | Position |
|---|---|---|---|---|---|---|
| 1948 | Otilio Ulate Blanco | 41,211 | 42.80% | 18 / 46 | New | 2nd |
