= 1949 Costa Rican general election =

- 4 October 1949
- Vice-Presidential election
Nominee	Alberto Oreamuno Flores; Alfredo Volio Mata
Party	PUN
Popular vote	69,228
Percentage	100%
Elected Vice Presidents
Alberto Oreamuno Flores
Alfredo Volio Mata
PUN
- Legislative election
- All 45 seats in the Legislative Assembly; 23 seats needed for a majority
- Turnout: 49.20% (▼5.20pp)
Party	Leader	Vote %	Seats	+/–
PUN	Otilio Ulate Blanco	71.69	35	+26
Constitutional	–	15.74	6	New
Social Democratic	José Figueres Ferrer	6.64	3	New
Democratic	Fernando Castro Cervantes	2.48	1	−8
This lists parties that won seats. See the complete results below.

General elections were held in Costa Rica on 4 October 1949. They followed the introduction of a new constitution after the Costa Rican Civil War. Voters elected a vice president (as none had been chosen in the 1948 elections) and the Legislative Assembly. The result was a victory for the National Unity Party, which received 72% of the vote. Voter turnout was 44% in the vice presidential election and 49% in the parliamentary election.

== Results ==
=== Vice president ===
Candidate	Party	Votes	%
Alberto Oreamuno Flores; Alfredo Volio Mata	National Union Party	69,228	100.00
Total		69,228	100.00
Registered voters/turnout		158,210	–
Source: TSE, Nohlen

=== Legislative Assembly ===
Party	Votes	%	Seats
National Union Party	55,804	71.69	35
Constitutional Party	12,254	15.74	6
Social Democratic Party	5,169	6.64	3
Cortesist Democratic Party	1,931	2.48	1
Cartaginese Union Party	1,383	1.78	0
Alajuelan Cortesist Democrat Party	1,305	1.68	0
Total	77,846	100.00	45
Valid votes	77,846	100.00	
Invalid/blank votes	0	0.00	
Total votes	77,846	100.00	
Registered voters/turnout	158,224	49.20	
Source: Nohlen, TSE
