= 1940 Costa Rican general election =

- 11 February 1940
- Presidential election
- Registered: 139,220
- Turnout: 80.85% (▲12.01pp)
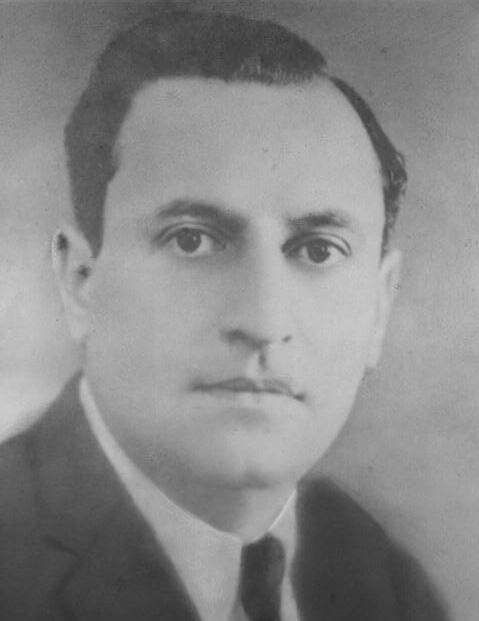

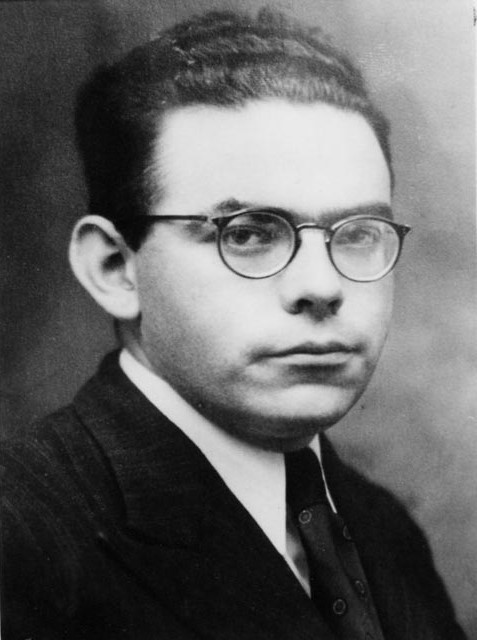

Nominee	Rafael Ángel Calderón Guardia	Manuel Mora Valverde	Virgilio Salazar Leiva
Party	PRN	BOC	CG
Popular vote	92,849	10,825	6,242
Percentage	84.47%	9.85%	5.68%
- Official results by province
President before election
León Cortés Castro
PRN
Elected President
Rafael Ángel Calderón Guardia
PRN
- Legislative election
- 23 of the 44 seats in the Constitutional Congress
Party	Leader	Seats	+/–
PRN	Rafael Ángel Calderón Guardia	23	+7
This lists parties that won seats. See the complete results below.
Results by province

General elections were held in Costa Rica on 11 February 1940. Rafael Ángel Calderón Guardia of the governing National Republican Party won the presidential election. Voter turnout was 81% in the presidential election and 66% in the parliamentary election.

The party also won all 23 constested seats in the Constitutional Congress. Among those elected as deputies were future presidents Teodoro Picado Michalski (for San José) and Francisco Orlich Bolmarcich (for Alajuela).

== Background ==
Since 1938, internal divisions had begun to emerge within the ruling National Republican Party. One faction coalesced around former president Ricardo Jiménez Oreamuno, while another formed around the younger and increasingly influential physician and politician Rafael Ángel Calderón Guardia, then 40 years old. Calderón’s growing prominence within the party proved decisive. Under his leadership, the party shifted away from its previous liberal orientation toward positions influenced by Catholic social teaching and Christian social reform, reflecting ideas he had encountered during his medical studies in Belgium. This ideological transformation would later contribute to significant political realignments and divisions within Costa Rican politics.

By contrast, the 81-year-old Jiménez gradually withdrew from active political leadership, and jimenismo lost influence to calderonismo, which also enjoyed the backing of the administration of President León Cortés Castro. Cortés initially supported Calderón’s ascendancy and reportedly encouraged Jiménez’s retirement from frontline politics.

Efforts were made to prevent a Calderonist victory through the formation of a coalition known as the National Democratic Alliance, comprising the Communist Party, a faction aligned with Jiménez, and the social democratic Guanacastecan Brotherhood. However, when Jiménez declined to stand as a candidate, the alliance collapsed, and its constituent parties contested the election separately.

Calderón was subsequently selected as the National Republican Party’s presidential nominee at its national convention and went on to win the election.

== Results ==
=== President ===
Candidate	Party	Votes	%
Rafael Ángel Calderón Guardia	National Republican Party	92,849	84.47
Manuel Mora Valverde	Bloc of Workers and Farmers	10,825	9.85
Virgilio Salazar Leiva	Confraternidad Guanacasteca	6,242	5.68
Total		109,916	100.00
Valid votes		109,916	97.65
Invalid/blank votes		2,643	2.35
Total votes		112,559	100.00
Registered voters/turnout		139,220	80.85
Source: Nohlen
