= Alfredo Volio Mata =

Costa Rican engineer and politician (1903–1963)

Second Vice President of Costa Rica
- In office 8 November 1949 – 8 November 1953 Serving with Alberto Oreamuno Flores
- President: Otilio Ulate Blanco
- Preceded by: Office established
- Succeeded by: Fernando Esquivel Bonilla

Manager of the Costa Rican Social Security Fund
- In office 8 May 1958 – 8 May 1962
- President: Mario Echandi Jiménez
- Preceded by: Cipriano Güell Partegás
- Succeeded by: Rodrigo Fournier Guevara

Secretary of Public Works and Agriculture
- In office 8 May 1940 – 15 April 1942
- President: Rafael Ángel Calderón Guardia
- Preceded by: Ricardo Pacheco Lara
- Succeeded by: Jorge Zeledón Castro

Deputy of the Constitutional Congress
- In office 1 May 1936 – 30 April 1940
- Constituency: Cartago Province

Personal details
- Born: Alfredo Rafael de Jesús Volio Mata; 15 September 1903 Cartago, Costa Rica
- Died: 14 October 1963 (aged 60) Cartago, Costa Rica
- Party: PUN
- Other political affiliations: PRN (1936)
- Children: 1
- Relatives: Jorge Volio Jiménez (uncle)
- Education: University of California, Berkeley (BE)
- Occupation: Agricultural engineer; politician; professor; businessman

Alfredo Rafael de Jesús Volio Mata (15 September 1903 – 14 October 1963) was a Costa Rican agricultural engineer, academic and politician who served as Second Vice President of Costa Rica from 1949 to 1953. A member of the National Union Party, he previously served in the Constitutional Congress from 1936 to 1940.

Volio was born in Cartago to politician Alfredo Volio Jiménez and Celina Mata Bonilla. A nephew of Jorge Volio Jiménez, he studied agricultural engineering at the University of California, Berkeley. He devoted much of his career to agricultural education and rural development.

Volio taught at the National School of Agriculture and joined the faculty of the newly established University of Costa Rica in 1940. When the National School of Agriculture was incorporated into the university as the Faculty of Agronomy, Volio was elected its first dean, serving from 1940 to 1942.

As a member of the National Republican Party, Volio was elected deputy to the Constitutional Congress in 1936. He subsequently served as Secretary of Agriculture and Public Works under President Rafael Ángel Calderón Guardia from 1940 until his resignation in 1942, being succeeded by Jorge Zeledón Castro.

Following the adoption of the 1949 Constitution, which created the elected offices of vice president, Volio was elected as Second Vice President of Costa Rica alongside First Vice President Alberto Oreamuno Flores on the ticket supporting president-elect Otilio Ulate Blanco, and served from 1949 to 1953.

In addition to his academic and political careers, Volio represented Costa Rica internationally. He headed the Costa Rican delegation to the United Nations in Paris in 1951 and later served as a delegate to the organization in New York in 1959. He also served as manager of the Costa Rican Social Security Fund from 1958 to 1962 and as president of the National Chamber of Agriculture.

Volio died on 14 October 1963 at the age of 60.
