= Marita Camacho Quirós =

First Lady of Costa Rica from 1962 to 1966 (1911–2025)

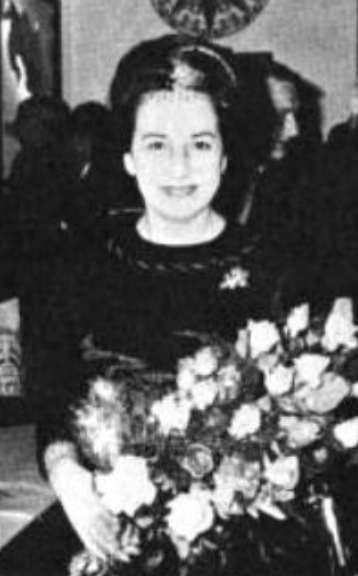
- Camacho Quirós in 1962

First Lady of Costa Rica
- In office 8 May 1962 – 8 May 1966
- President: Francisco Orlich Bolmarcich
- Preceded by: Olga de Benedictis Antonelli
- Succeeded by: Clara Fonseca Guardia

Personal details
- Born: Marita del Carmen Camacho Quirós; 10 March 1911 San Ramón, Costa Rica
- Died: 20 June 2025 (aged 114 years, 102 days) San José, Costa Rica
- Party: PLN
- Spouse: Francisco Orlich Bolmarcich (m. 1932; died 1969)
- Children: 2
- Relatives: Daniel Oduber Quirós (second cousin); Carlos Humberto Rodríguez Quirós (second cousin)
- Known for: Oldest Costa Rican person ever

Marita del Carmen Camacho Quirós (10 March 1911 – 20 June 2025) was a Costa Rican supercentenarian who served as First Lady of Costa Rica from 1962 to 1966 during the presidency of her husband, Francisco Orlich Bolmarcich. At the time of her death, Camacho Quirós was the oldest living Costa Rican and the oldest former first lady in the world.

== Personal life ==
Camacho Quirós was born on 10 March 1911 in San Ramón, located within Alajuela Province. Her parents were Salustio Camacho and Zeneida Quirós, both farmers. She was their seventh daughter.

Camacho Quirós married the businessman and politician Francisco José Orlich Bolmarcich in the nearby city of Naranjo de Alajuela, on 16 April 1932. They had two sons, Francisco Orlich Camacho and Mauricio Orlich Camacho.

Her husband died on 29 October 1969.

== First Lady of Costa Rica ==
On 8 May 1962, Bolmarcich became the President of Costa Rica. Upon her husband's inauguration, Camacho Quirós became the First Lady of Costa Rica. She maintained the position until 8 May 1966 when Clara Fonseca Guardia succeeded her.

As First Lady, she actively worked for children by promoting children's shelters, teaching schools, school canteens, and community centres. She supported the Hospicio de Huérfanos de San José and the 1964 creation of the Hospital Nacional de Niños.

Camacho Quirós made several trips abroad with her husband as First Lady. They met with Pope John XXIII, Francisco Franco, and American presidents John F. Kennedy and Lyndon B. Johnson.

== Longevity ==
On 10 March 2021, Camacho Quirós turned 110 years old, becoming a supercentenarian. She was verified by the Gerontology Research Group as being the oldest Costa Rican to ever live, and was also the oldest living former first lady for several years. She died on 20 June 2025, at the age of 114 years and 102 days. She was succeeded as oldest living former first lady by Catherine M'ba of Gabon, widow of Léon M'ba, aged 107.

Political offices
| Preceded by Olga De Benedictis Antonelli | First Lady of Costa Rica; 1962–1966 | Succeeded by Clara Fonseca Guardia |
