= 1942 Costa Rican parliamentary election =

- 8 February 1942
- 22 of the 44 seats in the Constitutional Congress
- Turnout: 73.98%
Party	Leader	Vote %	Seats
PRN	Rafael Ángel Calderón Guardia	63.27	13
POC	Manuel Mora Valverde	16.29	4
Democratic		9.19	2
PCA	León Cortés Castro	8.15	2
CG	Virgilio Salazar Leiva	2.44	1
This lists parties that won seats. See the complete results below.
Results by province

Mid-term parliamentary elections were held in Costa Rica on 8 February 1942. The ruling Independent National Republican Party, led by President Rafael Ángel Calderón Guardia presented candidates throughout the country. The Workers and Farmers Party, which had been a staunch opponent of Calderon at the time, fielded candidates in every province except rural Guanacaste. In addition, the Alajuelan Cortesist Party of León Cortés Castro ran in Alajuela and the Democratic Party (also close to former President Cortés) in San José.

The results were a resounding success for the Independent National Republican Party, which won a large majority. However, the elections were heavily criticised and were accused of involving fraudulent behaviour by most other parties.

== Results ==
Party	Votes	%	Seats
National Republican Party	66,256	63.27	13
Workers and Farmers Party	17,060	16.29	4
Democratic Party	9,628	9.19	2
Alajuelan Cortesist Party	8,532	8.15	2
Guanacastecan Brotherhood	2,554	2.44	1
Republicano Nacional Independiente	683	0.65	0
Total	104,713	100.00	22
Valid votes	104,713	99.65	
Invalid/blank votes	368	0.35	
Total votes	105,081	100.00	
Registered voters/turnout	142,047	73.98	
Source: Nohlen (votes)
