= Article 98 of the Constitution of Costa Rica =

Clause of Costa Rican Constitution

Flag of the Communist Party of Costa Rica, outlawed by the article.

The Article 98 of the Constitution of Costa Rica is the article that regulates free citizen association in political parties.

The article was controversial for decades as, in its original writing, prohibited the existence of the Costa Rican Communist Party. Prohibition that was in place from the promulgation of the Constitution on November 8, 1949 until its reform on June 4, 1975.

== Text ==
The original text said:

Artículo 98.- Todos los ciudadanos tienen derecho de agruparse en partidos para intervenir en la política nacional. Sin embargo, se prohíbe la formación o el funcionamiento de partidos que por sus programas ideológicos, medios de acción o vinculaciones internacionales, tiendan a destruir los fundamentos de la organización democrática de Costa Rica, o que atenten contra la soberanía del país, todo a juicio de la Asamblea Legislativa, por votación no menor de las dos terceras partes de sus miembros y previo informe del Tribunal Supremo de Elecciones.

Which can be translated as:

Article 98.- All citizens have the right to group themselves into parties to intervene in national politics. However, is forbidden the formation or operation of parties that, due to their ideological programs, means of action or international ties, tend to destroy the foundations of the democratic organization of Costa Rica, or that threaten the sovereignty of the country, under judgement from the Legislative Assembly, by vote of not less than two thirds of its members and prior report of the Supreme Electoral Tribunal.

The 5698 bill of June 4, 1975 changed the text to:

Artículo 98.- Todos los ciudadanos tienen derecho de agruparse en partidos, para intervenir en la política nacional, siempre que éstos se comprometan en sus programas a respetar el orden constitucional de la República.

Or:

Article 98.- All citizens have the right to group themselves into parties, to intervene in national politics, provided that they commit themselves in their programs to respect the constitutional order of the Republic.

A further reform on July 2, 1995 by the bill 7675 added: "Los partidos políticos expresarán el pluralismo político, concurrirán a la formación y manifestación de la voluntad popular y serán instrumentos fundamentales para la participación política. Su creación y el ejercicio de su actividad serán libres dentro del respeto a la Constitución y la ley. Su estructura interna y funcionamiento deberán ser democráticos [The political parties will express political pluralism, will attend the formation and manifestation of the popular will and will be fundamental instruments for political participation. Its creation and the exercise of its activity will be free within the respect of the Constitution and the law. Its internal structure and functioning must be democratic.]"

== History ==
After the Costa Rican Civil War of 1948, the agreements of the Pact of the Mexican Embassy signed by the leaders of the enemy sides José Figueres Ferrer of the National Liberation Army and Manuel Mora Valverde of the Costa Rican Communist Party, established that would be respected the lives, freedoms and right to political participation of all sides. This was not kept and the new Junta government chaired by Figueres, the Founding Junta of the Second Republic immediately persecuted and imprisoned the communists and their party was banned.

The first antecedent that the article had was the decree with the rank of law (since the Junta had suspended the Constitution of 1871 and enjoyed absolute powers) No. 1056 that expressly outlawed the People's Vanguard Party.

During the fierce persecution, Vanguardia Popular continued to organize in hiding. Mora goes into exile while Arnoldo Ferreto Segura is elected secretary general while in prison. Subsequently, a general political amnesty would be granted for communists and Calderonistas in the administration of Mario Echandi that would normalize the policy and promote the transition to democracy, but although free, the communists would continue to be banned and their attempts to reorganize were stopped by the application of the article 98 in the elections of 1953, 1958, 1962 and 1966.

As time passes, the system would tolerate the existence of political parties that were a clear screen of the old Popular Vanguard. The Socialist Action Party was founded in 1969, successfully electing Manuel Mora and Arnoldo Ferreto as deputies, and other leftist groups exist before 1975 although none was officially communist.

The discussion about the right of the communists to participate in elections began to be discussed since the 1970 election when Figueres himself (who was a presidential nominee) advocated for it. Christian Democratic candidate Jorge Arturo Monge Zamora did the same in 1974. During the 1974-1978 legislature under the presidency of Daniel Oduber Quirós, who sponsored the reform, the article was changed in 1975 to allow the communists to officially return to political life.
