= 1962 Costa Rican general election =

- 4 February 1962
- Presidential election
- Registered: 483,980
- Turnout: 80.87% (▲16.87pp)
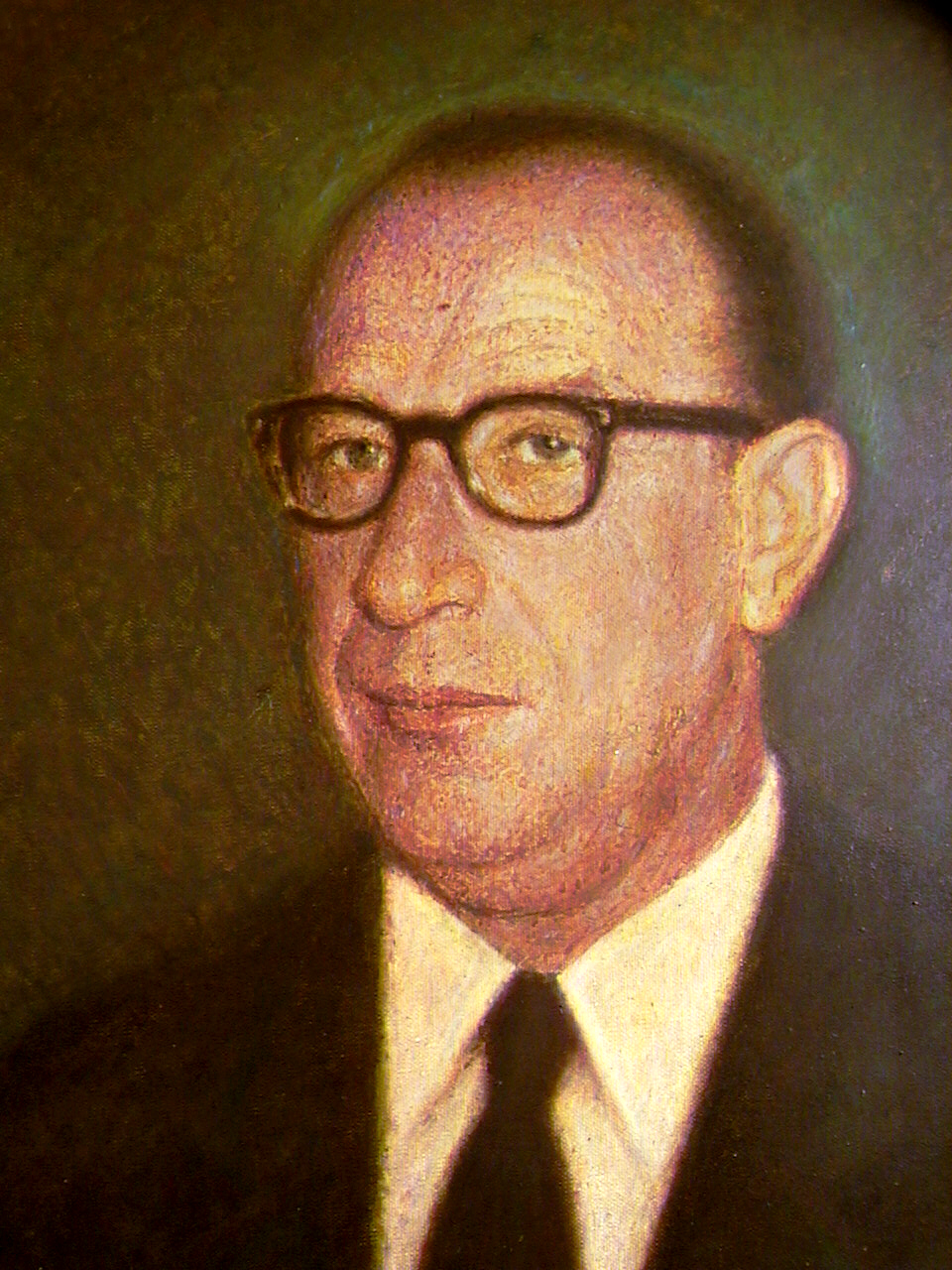

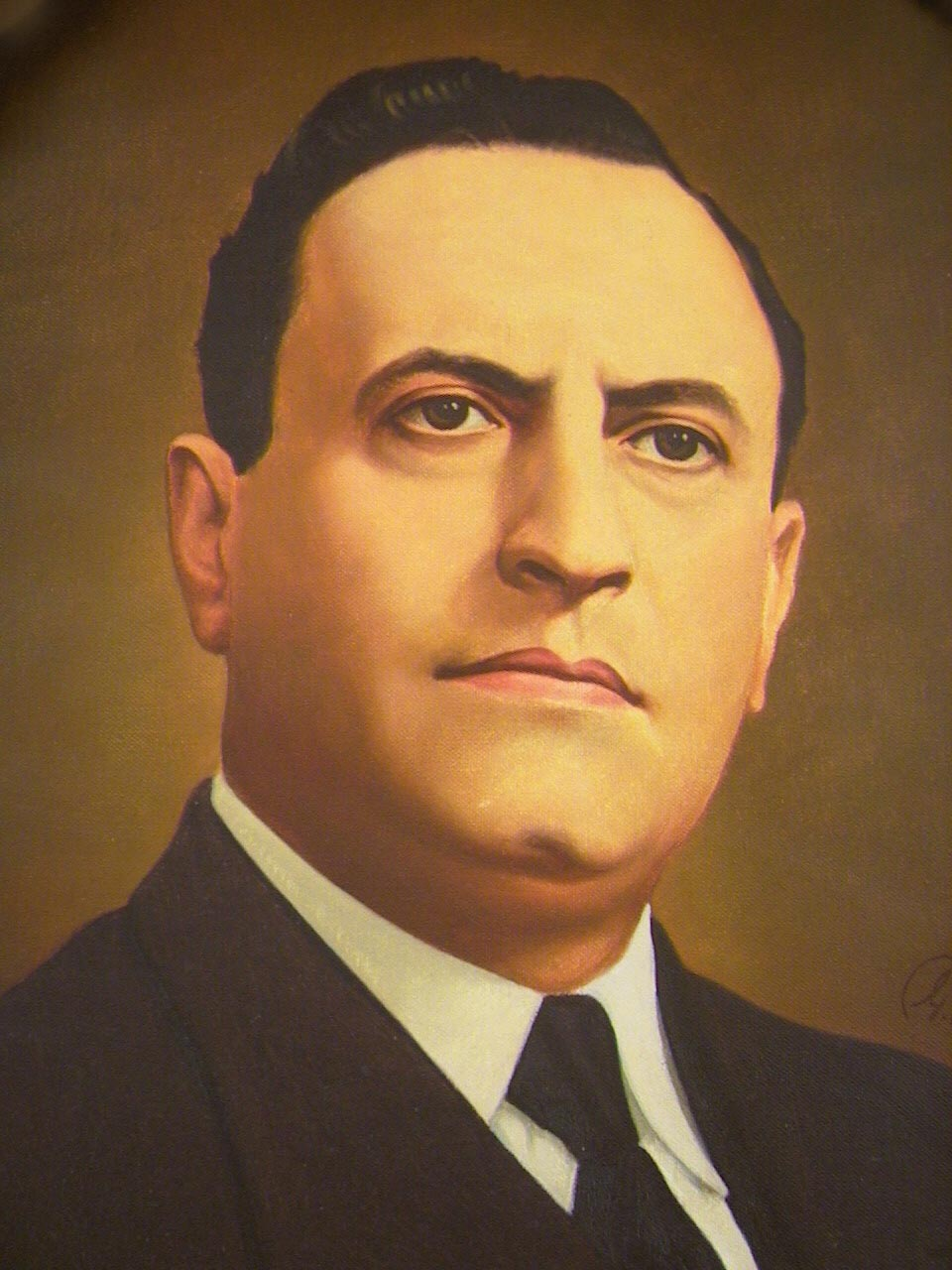

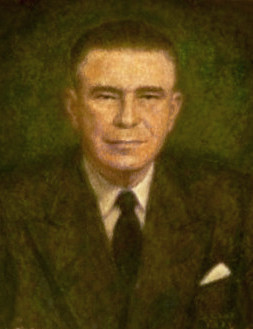
Nominee	Francisco Orlich	Rafael Calderón	Otilio Ulate
Party	PLN	PRN	PUN
Running mate	Raúl Blanco; Carlos Sáenz	Manuel Escalante; Ángel Chacón	Amadeo Quirós; Alexis Agüero
Popular vote	192,850	135,533	51,740
Percentage	50.29%	35.34%	13.49%
- Results by district Orlich: 30–40% 40–50% 50–60% 60–70% 70-80% 80-90% 90-100% Calderón: 50-60% 60-70% 70-80% Ulate: 40–50% 50–60% Tie: 30-40%
President before election
Mario Echandi
PUN
Elected President
Francisco Orlich
PLN
- Legislative election
- All 57 seats in the Legislative Assembly; 29 seats needed for a majority
- Turnout: 63.99% (▲16.90pp)
Party	Leader	Vote %	Seats	+/–
PLN	Francisco Orlich Bolmarcich	48.85	29	+9
PRN	Rafael Ángel Calderón Guardia	33.49	18	+7
PUN	Otilio Ulate Blanco	13.27	8	−2
PADP	Enrique Obregón Valverde	2.46	2	New
This lists parties that won seats. See the complete results below.
Results by province

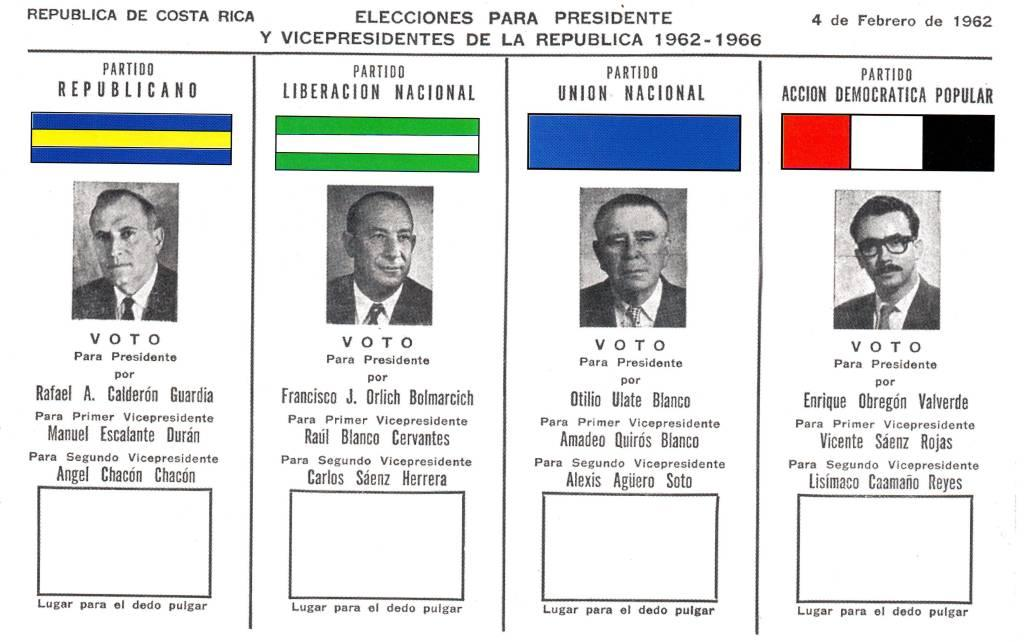
Ballot paper

General elections were held in Costa Rica on 4 February 1962. Francisco Orlich Bolmarcich of the National Liberation Party won the presidential election, whilst his party also won the parliamentary election. Voter turnout was 81%.

== Background ==
During Mario Echandi's presidency Rafael Angel Calderón, his family and supporters in exile, were allowed to return and a general amnesty was called for everyone involved in the still recent Civil War of 1948. Calderón was elected Congressman in the 1958 election. But meanwhile in the past election the National Liberation Party was split due to the separation of the “Rossist” faction in this election Calderon's candidacy unified PLN and other political allies into a strong anti-Calderonist ballot.

Both former presidents Otilio Ulate from National Union and Calderón himself from National Republican became candidates. PLN's candidate was, as in 1958, Francisco Orlich, one of the party's founder, commander of one of the fronts during the civil war and Figueres’ close friend.

A fourth small left-wing party named Popular Democratic Action led by socialist thinker Enrique Obregón also took part in the election nominating Obregon. Communism was illegal according to the Constitution and Marxist Parties were not allowed, but Obregon's party was officially socialist so the prohibition was not endorsed. Even so, Obregón did have the support of the traditional leadership and militancy of the (outlawed) Communist Party.

== Campaign ==
All parties promised land reform. Calderon's publicity was particular in saying “Yesterday social reform, today land reform” taking advantage of the socialist reforms during his presidency. As the Cuban Revolution was recent the anti-Communist speech was common. All main parties accused each other of having links with Communism; PLN because of its socialist ideology (social democracy) and Figueres alleged friendship with Fidel Castro and Calderón because of his previous alliance with the Communists in the 1940s. The far-right anti-Communist group Free Costa Rica Movement paid for a strong anti-Communist propaganda, especially against Popular Democratic Action.

== Results ==
=== President ===
Candidate	Party	Votes	%
Francisco Orlich Bolmarcich	National Liberation Party	192,850	50.29
Rafael Ángel Calderón Guardia	National Republican Party	135,533	35.34
Otilio Ulate Blanco	National Union Party	51,740	13.49
Enrique Obregón Valverde	Popular Democratic Action	3,339	0.87
Total		383,462	100.00
Valid votes		383,462	97.97
Invalid votes		5,020	1.28
Blank votes		2,924	0.75
Total votes		391,406	100.00
Registered voters/turnout		483,980	80.87
Source: Election Resources

==== By province ====
Province	Orlich %	Calderón %	Ulate %	Obregón %
San José	49.1	36.7	13.3	0.9
Alajuela	51.9	29.5	18.1	0.6
Cartago	56.7	30.8	12.1	0.5
Heredia	47.6	38.8	12.5	1.1
Puntarenas	43.9	42.2	11.9	2.0
Limón	45.0	46.7	7.3	1.0
Guanacaste	54.4	33.3	11.7	0.6
Total	50.3	35.3	13.5	0.9

=== Parliament ===
Party	Votes	%	Seats	+/–
National Liberation Party	184,135	48.85	29	+9
National Republican Party	126,249	33.49	18	+8
National Union Party	50,021	13.27	8	–2
Popular Democratic Action	9,256	2.46	2	New
Solidarist Action Party	3,358	0.89	0	New
Alajuelan Party	1,698	0.45	0	New
National Depuration Movement	1,192	0.32	0	New
Guanacastecan Independent Union	903	0.24	0	New
National Renewal Party	125	0.03	0	New
Total	376,937	100.00	57	+12
Valid votes	376,937	96.28		
Invalid votes	6,377	1.63		
Blank votes	8,186	2.09		
Total votes	391,500	100.00		
Registered voters/turnout	483,980	80.89		
Source: Election Resources

==== By province ====
Province	PLN		PRN		PUN		ADP		PAS		PA		MDN		UIG		PREN	
Province	%	S	%	S	%	S	%	S	%	S	%	S	%	S	%	S	%	S
San José	47.1	9	34.4	7	13.0	2	2.6	2	2.2	0	-	-	0.8	0	-	-	-	-
Alajuela	50.3	6	28.0	3	17.0	2	2.3	0	-	-	2.4	0	-	-	-	-	-	-
Cartago	56.2	4	29.8	2	12.8	1	1.2	0	-	-	-	-	-	-	-	-	-	-
Heredia	47.6	2	36.8	1	12.6	1	3.0	0	-	-	-	-	-	-	-	-	-	-
Puntarenas	42.9	3	40.1	2	12.1	1	4.9	0	-	-	-	-	-	-	-	-	-	-
Limón	45.3	2	44.1	1	7.0	0	2.8	0	-	-	-	-	-	-	-	-	0.8	0
Guanacaste	52.3	3	32.2	2	11.9	1	0.8	0	-	-	-	-	-	-	2.8	0	-	-
Total	48.9	29	33.5	18	13.3	8	2.5	2	0.9	0	0.5	0	0.3	0	0.2	0	0.1	0

=== Local governments ===
Party	Votes	%	Seats			
Party	Votes	%	Alderpeople	+/–	Municipal syndics	+/–
National Liberation Party	187,293	49.87	148	23	280	+17
National Republican Party	126,849	33.78	93	+46	42	+19
National Union Party	51,239	13.64	31	–39	2	–30
Popular Democratic Action	6,643	1.77	2	New	2	New
Solidarist Action Party	1,371	0.37	1	New	0	New
Alajuelan Party	724	0.19	0	New	0	New
Guanacastecan Independent Union Party	550	0.15	0	New	0	New
National Depuration Movement	470	0.13	0	New	0	New
National Renewal Party	416	0.11	0	New	0	New
Total	375,555	100.00	275	+21	326	+4
Valid votes	375,555	95.88				
Invalid votes	5,932	1.51				
Blank votes	10,221	2.61				
Total votes	391,708	100.00				
Registered voters/turnout	483,980	80.93				
Source: TSE
