= Oreamuno =

Oreamuno may refer to:

- Alberto Oreamuno Flores (1905–1980), Costa Rican political figure
- Eusebio Figueroa Oreamuno (1827–1883), Costa Rican politician
- Joaquín de Oreamuno y Muñoz de la Trinidad (1755–1827), Costa Rican who led a coup in 1823
- Manuel de Jesús Jiménez Oreamuno (1854–1916), Costa Rican politician
- Próspero Fernández Oreamuno, President of Costa Rica from 1882 to 1885
- Ricardo Jiménez Oreamuno served as president of Costa Rica on three occasions

== See also ==
- Oreamuno Canton, the name of the seventh canton in the province of Cartago in Costa Rica
