= José Joaquín Trejos Fernández =

President of Costa Rica from 1966 to 1970

José Joaquín Trejos
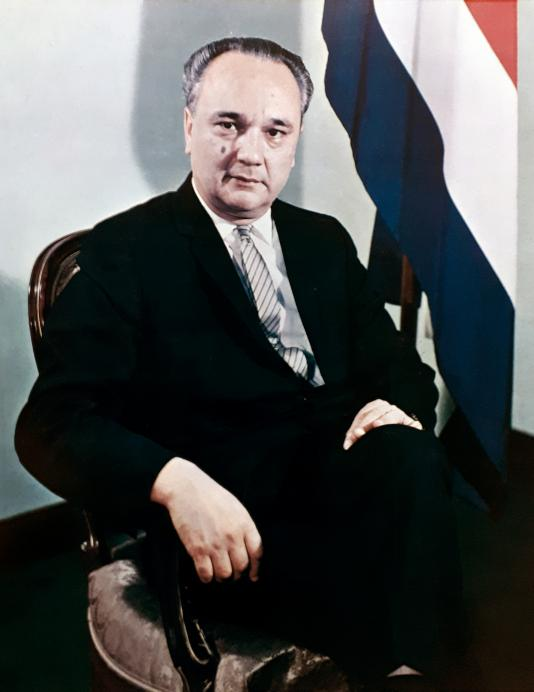
- Portrait c. 1966

35th President of Costa Rica
- In office 8 May 1966 – 8 May 1970
- Vice President: Jorge Vega Rodríguez; Virgilio Calvo Sánchez
- Preceded by: Francisco Orlich
- Succeeded by: José Figueres Ferrer

Personal details
- Born: José Joaquín Antonio Trejos Fernández; 18 April 1916 San José, Costa Rica
- Died: 10 February 2010 (aged 93) San José, Costa Rica
- Party: PUSC
- Other political affiliations: Unity Coalition (1976–1983); National Unification Party (1965–1976)
- Spouse: Clara Fonseca Guardia (m. 1936)
- Children: 5
- Education: University of Chicago (BA)
- Occupation: Economist; professor; politician; academic administrator; writer
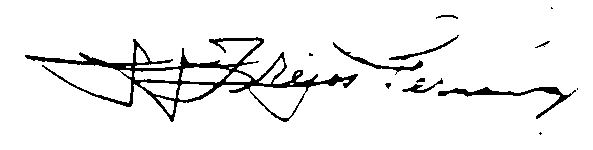
- Signature
- Nickname: Cielito Lindo

José Joaquín Antonio Trejos Fernández (18 April 1916 – 10 February 2010) was a Costa Rican economist, academic and politician who served as the 35th President of Costa Rica from 1966 to 1970. A member of the National Unification Party, his administration was characterized by fiscal austerity and an emphasis on orderly public financial management.

Before entering politics, Trejos was a professor at the University of Costa Rica, where he taught for 22 years. He resigned from the institution in 1970 following the student protests against the Aluminum Company of America (ALCOA) bauxite concessions near the end of his presidency.

== Early life and career ==
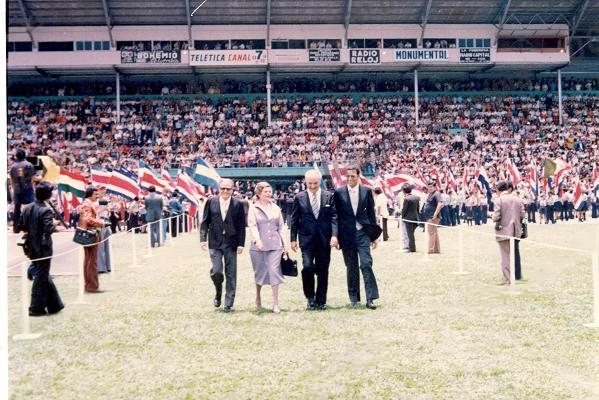
Trejos (center) at the 1966 presidential innaguration, held at the old National Stadium.

José Joaquín Antonio Trejos Fernández was born on 18 April 1916 at his family's home in the Catedral district of San José, Costa Rica. He was the third of six children—four sisters and one brother—and the eldest son of writer Juan Trejos Quirós and Emilia Fernández Aguilar. His father managed the family bookstore and printing business, Librería e Imprenta Trejos Hermanos, where Trejos began working immediately after completing primary school and gradually assumed greater responsibilities.

Due to personal differences with his father regarding his schooling, Trejos did not attend regular secondary school. Instead, he completed his education through night school and private tutors, which he financed with his earnings from the family business, by passing proficiency examinations in various subjects, and by engaging in autodidacticism. He later entered the University of Costa Rica, which was in the process of being established at the time. His wife, Clara Fonseca Guardia—who was a cousin of President Rafael Ángel Calderón Guardia—requested that the president consider Trejos for a position, citing his aptitude in mathematics.

Trejos earned a degree in economics from the University of Chicago in 1947. After returning to Costa Rica, he resumed his academic career at the University of Costa Rica, where he distinguished himself as a professor of mathematics, chemistry, and economics. He had been appointed professor at the university in 1943 at the age of 27 and subsequently held several senior academic and administrative positions.

Trejos served as dean of the Faculty of Economic and Social Sciences from 1953 to 1957, where he was among its founders and first professors. From 1957 to 1958, he was the first director of the Department of General Studies, responsible for compulsory humanities courses. He later served as dean of the Faculty of Sciences and Letters from 1957 to 1961.

During the administration of President Otilio Ulate Blanco, Trejos was appointed to the Consejo Nacional de Salarios ("National Salaries Council"), a technical body of the Ministry of Labor and Social Welfare. Under Mario Echandi Jiménez, Trejos served on the Board of Governors of the Central Bank of Costa Rica from 1958 to 1962, a position to which he was appointed based on his academic expertise in economics. He resigned shortly after Francisco Orlich Bolmarcich assumed the presidency, along with two other board members, citing differences of opinion with the incoming administration, and subsequently returned to full-time academic work.

== Presidency (1966–1970) ==
Despite having no prior electoral or partisan political experience, Trejos was nominated for the 1966 presidential election as the candidate of the opposition National Unification Coalition (UN). The coalition was formed by the National Republican Party and the National Union Party with the aim of defeating the governing National Liberation Party (PLN).

During the campaign, members of the PLN popularized the nickname “Cielito Lindo” in reference to a widely circulated image of Trejos highlighting a prominent mole on the left side of his face, which he had since birth. The nickname alluded to the Mexican folk song of the same name and was initially intended as mockery. Trejos’s campaign later adopted the nickname, and it subsequently became widely associated with him at the national level.

Trejos ultimately won the election by a narrow margin, defeating PLN candidate Daniel Oduber Quirós by 4,220 votes, just under 1% of the total cast. The result generated tension with the outgoing governing party, particularly with former president José Figueres Ferrer. The PLN submitted multiple requests to the Supreme Electoral Court for recounts at various polling stations, as well as petitions seeking annulment of the election results. All were ultimately rejected, and the final outcome remained unchanged.

Although Trejos secured the presidency, his coalition failed to obtain a parliamentary majority. In the concurrent legislative elections, the UN won 26 seats in the Legislative Assembly, while opposition parties secured the remaining 31, limiting the administration’s ability to advance its legislative agenda.

The Trejos administration inherited a severe government debt crisis. In response, the government implemented austerity measures and reduced public spending. Trejos advocated for economic liberalization and repeatedly criticized extensive state intervention in the economy. He sought to repeal the state monopoly on banking established by the Founding Junta of the Second Republic in 1948. However, the proposal did not receive legislative approval. The administration also introduced a sales tax, a measure that proved unpopular and which Trejos had initially opposed. Despite public resistance, the policy contributed to stabilizing state finances. The central government’s external debt was reduced by approximately $4 million. Between 1967 and 1968, exports increased by an estimated $39 million, and short-term debts within the national banking system—totaling more than $19 million—were repaid. Net reserve currency held by the banking system, which had stood at a negative balance of more than $13 million as of 31 December 1966, improved during his term.

On 11 June 1969, Trejos's administration established the Banco Popular y de Desarrollo Comunal, a public bank created to promote savings and provide credit to workers, with the stated aim of improving their economic security and well-being. According to later accounts by Trejos, the institution was also intended to serve an educational function by encouraging a culture of saving among citizens, thereby contributing to improved living conditions.

During his presidency, the Higher Normal School was established. Additionally, the proposal to create a National Technological Institute was submitted to the Legislative Assembly during his term, but was only approved in 1971 under the subsequent administration. During this period, the building housing the National Library was sold to a private company. The structure, a neoclassical building, was later demolished and the site converted into a parking lot. According to contemporary accounts, the proceeds from the sale were used to finance the construction of the current National Library building, of which only a stone wall from the original structure remains.

Trejos personally opposed presidential re-election, including non-consecutive terms, and during his administration a constitutional reform was introduced to amend Article 132 of the Constitution in order to prohibit the practice. The Legislative Assembly approved the amendment in 1969, which did not apply retroactively and therefore did not prevent former presidents from seeking office. Trejos himself never sought re-election. The ban on presidential re-election remained in force until it was lifted by judicial rulling in 2003, allowing the re-election of Óscar Arias Sánchez in 2006.

== Post-presidency ==
After leaving office, Trejos remained active in public life, collaborating with Christian social organizations and contributing to political and intellectual discourse. He served as President of the Unity Coalition from 1979 to 1982, and actively campaigned for the coalition and the Social Christian Unity Party (PUSC) in 1978, 1982 and 1986.

Trejos authored several books, including Ocho años en la política costarricense: ideales políticos y realidad nacional (“Eight Years in Costa Rican Politics: Political Ideals and National Reality”) in 1973, Ideas políticas elementales (“Fundamental Political Ideas”) in 1985, and his autobiography, Por esfuerzo propio (“By My Own Effort”), published in 1999.

On 7 August 2006, Trejos was declared Benemérito de la Patria by the Legislative Assembly of Costa Rica in recognition of his public service. He died on 10 February 2010. In the months preceding his death, his health declined following an accident in December 2009.

The 2016 ideological congress of the Social Christian Unity Party, held in October, was officially named in honor of Trejos, recognizing his legacy as part of the party’s history.

Political offices
Preceded by Francisco Orlich Bolmarcich	President of Costa Rica; 1966–1970	Succeeded by José Figueres Ferrer
