= Costa Rican People's Party =

Costa Rican People's Party Partido del Pueblo Costarricense
- Leader: Eduardo Mora Valverde
- Founder: Manuel Mora
- Founded: 1984
- Dissolved: 2006 (presumed)
- Split from: Popular Vanguard Party
- Ideology: Socialism; Comunismo a la tica

The Costa Rican People's Party (Spanish: Partido del Pueblo Costarricense, abbreviated as PPC) was a communist party in Costa Rica. In March 1984 the Popular Vanguard Party split in two factions. The majority led by Humberto Vargas Carbonell was more radical than the faction of Eduardo Mora Valverde. Both factions wanted to keep the party name. After a court decision the faction of Mora was renamed in PPC in April 1985.

The PPC was registered at the Supreme Electoral Tribunal (TSE) between June 1988 and September 1995 as Civilian People's Party (Partido del Pueblo Civilista).

The PPC was led 2004 by Pablo Morales Rivera and published Libertad.

The PPC candidated for general elections in different alliances: in United People (Pueblo Unido) in 1986 and 1990, in the United Left (Izquierda Unida) in 2006.

The collapse of the Soviet Union debilitated the PPC. Members went to the new Democratic Force (Fuerza Democrática, FD) that was founded in 1993 or left for other parties. Eduardo Mora Valverde and José Merino del Rio became founders of the Broad Front (Frente Amplio) in 2004. After 2006 the PPC seems to have disappeared.

The PPC was a member of the Foro de São Paulo.
