= Fernando Castro Cervantes =

Costa Rican businessman and politician (1881–1967)

- Castro in 1953

Personal details
- Born: León Fernando Castro Cervantes; 29 June 1881 San José, Costa Rica
- Died: 24 January 1967 (aged 85) San José, Costa Rica
- Occupation: Businessman; politician; landowner; rancher

León Fernando Castro Cervantes (29 June 1881 – 24 January 1967) was a Costa Rican businessman, rancher, and politician. One of the wealthiest landowners in Costa Rica during the 1940s and 1950s, he was a prominent member of the Democratic Party and succeeded former president León Cortés Castro as the party's political leader following Cortés's death in 1946.

== Early life and career ==
Castro was born on 29 June 1881 to Pío Castro and Antonia Cervantes. He amassed considerable wealth through his agricultural and ranching enterprises and became one of the country's most prominent landowners.

Following the sudden death of León Cortés Castro in March 1946, Castro emerged as one of the principal leaders of the Democratic Party and of the anti-Calderonista opposition. His first attempt to seek the presidency came in 1947, when he entered the National Opposition Convention as the candidate from the Democratic Party. While he received 36.5% of the vote, the convention ultimately selected Otilio Ulate Blanco of the National Union Party as the opposition's unified presidential nominee for the 1948 general election.

Although Castro had openly opposed the governments of Rafael Ángel Calderón Guardia and Teodoro Picado Michalski before the Costa Rican Civil War, historians have noted that, like a number of other anti-Calderonista figures, he became increasingly critical of the political dominance of José Figueres Ferrer and the postwar order established after 1948.

Castro was the Democratic Party's candidate in the 1953 general election, the first presidential election held after the civil war and the restoration of constitutional government. His candidacy gained additional significance after the Supreme Electoral Court invalidated the candidacy of Mario Echandi Jiménez of the National Union Party due to purported irregularities in the adherents' signatures. As a result, the National Union Party endorsed Castro's campaign against Figueres, who was running as the candidate of the newly founded National Liberation Party. Despite receiving support from important opposition sectors, Castro was unable to unite all political and social groups opposed to Figueres. He was defeated in the election, being the runner-up and receiving 35.3% of the vote.

== Later life and legacy ==
Following his defeat in 1953, Castro retired from active politics and devoted himself primarily to his business and agricultural interests. As a landowner, he allowed poor families to settle and cultivate portions of his property.

In recognition of his contributions, the Fernando Castro Cervantes National Wildlife Refuge on Costa Rica's Central Pacific coast was named in his honor on 16 February 1994.
