= Yvonne Clays Spoelders =

First Lady of Costa Rica (1906-1994)

First Lady of Costa Rica
- In role May 8, 1940 – May 8, 1944
- President: Rafael Ángel Calderón Guardia
- Preceded by: Julia Fernández Rodríguez
- Succeeded by: Etelvina Ramírez Montiel

Personal details
- Born: June 3, 1906 Antwerp, Belgium
- Died: February 11, 1994 (aged 87) San José, Costa Rica
- Spouse: Rafael Ángel Calderón Guardia (1927–1945; divorced)

Yvonne Clays Spoelders (June 3, 1906 – February 11, 1994) was a Belgian aristocrat, First Lady of Costa Rica from 1940 to 1944 and the country's first female diplomat.

Clays was born on June 3, 1906, in Antwerp, Belgium, to Jozef Clays and Maria-Catherine Spoelders. She studied in Belgium, France, and Great Britain. While on vacation at her family's beach house in Blankenberge she met Rafael Ángel Calderón Guardia, then a young foreign student. She married the future Costa Rican president in Antwerp on July 28, 1927.

She was member and Secretary General of the Samaritan Ladies Society, an entity created by First Lady Julia Fernández Rodríguez (wife of President León Cortés Castro) which was ultimately responsible for the creation of the Casa de la Madre y el Niño (House of the Mother and Child).

During her husband's administration she was actively involved in diverse social causes and in 1940 she reestablished the National Symphony Orchestra of Costa Rica. She was the first president of the Orchestra's board of directors and remained so until 1947 without salary.

She acted as official translator during President Calderón's 1940 meeting with President Franklin Delano Roosevelt. Clays later became Costa Rica's first female diplomat and was in charge of several missions in the United States. She had a long friendship with American Under Secretary of State Sumner Welles and thanks to her mediation the 1942 signing of the Fernández-Pierson contract was possible, in which Costa Rica was granted a credit of up to US$2,000,000. Clays' intervention also achieved the establishment of the Instituto Interamericano de Ciencias Agrícolas in Costa Rica in 1943, today known as the Instituto Interamericano de Cooperación para la Agricultura.

Clays died in San José, Costa Rica, on February 11, 1994. At the time of her death she left her personal library to the University of Costa Rica Faculty of Science.
