= 1946 Costa Rican parliamentary election =

- 10 February 1946
- 23 of the 46 seats in the Constitutional Congress
- Turnout: 64.33%
| Party | Leader | Vote % | Seats | +/– |
|---|---|---|---|---|
| PRN | Teodoro Picado Michalski | 50.52 | 12 | +1 |
| Democratic | León Cortés Castro | 41.61 | 9 | 0 |
| PVP | Manuel Mora Valverde | 5.41 | 2 | −1 |
This lists parties that won seats. See the complete results below.
Results by province

Mid-term parliamentary elections were held in Costa Rica on 10 February 1946. The result was a victory for the National Republican Party, which received 51% of the vote. Voter turnout was 64%. They were the last mid-term elections in the country's history.

== Results ==
| Party | Votes | % | Seats |
|---|---|---|---|
| National Republican Party | 52,044 | 50.52 | 12 |
| Democratic Party | 42,860 | 41.61 | 9 |
| People's Vanguard Party | 5,577 | 5.41 | 2 |
| Republican Party | 1,095 | 1.06 | 0 |
| Abstencionista | 672 | 0.65 | 0 |
| Anticomunista | 521 | 0.51 | 0 |
| Renovación Provincial | 243 | 0.24 | 0 |
| Total | 103,012 | 100.00 | 23 |
| Valid votes | 103,012 | 99.88 | |
| Invalid/blank votes | 127 | 0.12 | |
| Total votes | 103,139 | 100.00 | |
| Registered voters/turnout | 160,336 | 64.33 | |
Source: Nohlen
