= Carlos Sáenz Herrera =

Costa Rican pediatrician and politician (1910–1980)

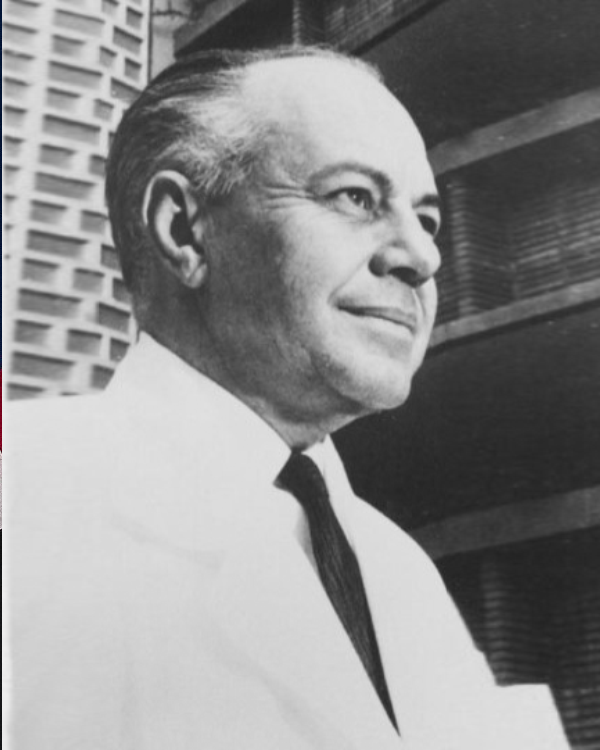

Second Vice President of Costa Rica
- In office 8 May 1962 – 8 May 1966 Serving with Raúl Blanco Cervantes
- President: Francisco Orlich Bolmarcich
- Preceded by: José Joaquín Peralta Esquivel
- Succeeded by: Virgilio Calvo Sánchez

Director of the National Children's Hospital
- In office 24 May 1964 – 30 September 1971
- Preceded by: Office established
- Succeeded by: Édgar Mohs Villalta

Minister of Public Health
- In office 8 November 1949 – 8 August 1951
- President: Otilio Ulate Blanco
- Preceded by: Raúl Blanco Cervantes
- Succeeded by: José Cabezas Duffner

Personal details
- Born: Carlos Agustín Sáenz Herrera; 1 September 1910 Brussels, Belgium
- Died: 7 November 1980 (aged 70) San José, Costa Rica
- Party: PLN
- Spouse: Ángela Carbonell Massenet (m. 1958)
- Education: Université libre de Bruxelles (MBBS)
- Occupation: Physician; pediatrician; politician; professor

Carlos Agustín Sáenz Herrera (1 September 1910 – 7 November 1980) was a Costa Rican physician, pediatrician, and politician who served as Second Vice President of Costa Rica from 1962 to 1966. A member of the National Liberation Party, he was a pioneer of pediatrics in Costa Rica and served as the founding director of the National Children's Hospital from 1964 to 1971.

His parents were José Carlos Sáenz Esquivel and Úrsula Celina Herrera and Paut. He married his first wife in Cartago, Costa Rica, on 4 December 1937. Her name was María Virginia Pacheco Gutiérrez, daughter of José Joaquín Pacheco Cooper and Carlota Gutiérrez Urtecho. His second wife, married on 1 September 1958, was Ángela Carbonell Massenet. She was the daughter of Francisco of Take Carbonell I Reverter and Juana Bautista Massenet Pozo.

His primary studies were in the School Juan Rafael Dwells and secondary the Liceo of Costa Rica in Saint José where obtained his baccalaureate. When he finished his secondary studies he traveled to Belgium (1928), where graduated of doctor in Medicine in the Free University of Brussels (1934). Later he specialized in pediatrics in the University of Strasbourg, and returned to Costa Rica in 1935.

== Professional activity ==
He was an early pediatrician of Costa Rica. For many years he served as the chairman of the Section of Pediatrics at the Hospital San Juan of God, and his efforts led to the foundation of the National Children's Hospital, inaugurated in 1964, that today carries his name.

== Public office ==
He served as minister of health from 1949 to 1951 and Vice President of Costa Rica from 1962 to 1966. He served as interim President in 1963 and 1965, in replacement of the president Francisco José Orlich Bolmarcich. Also, he was a leader in Social Insurance, professor and dean of the Faculty of Medicine of the University of Costa Rica and president of the School of Doctors and Surgeons.

The government of Belgium honored him in 1963 with the Order of the Crown.

== Private activities ==
He was an important criador of livestock of milk in his fincas The Jaúles, Bretaña and The Retreat, and obtained important prizes in exhibitions national and international agriculture people.

He was highly respected in his country, with a reputation of generosity and delivery to his patients.

== Demise ==
He died in San José, Costa Rica, on 7 November 1980. The Legislative Assembly of Costa Rica declared it benemérito of the Homeland in 1980.

His son, Alberto Sáenz Pacheco, is also an eminent doctor and has occupied a lead role in social insurance.

== See also ==
- Vice presidents of Costa Rica
