= José Carlos Sáenz Esquivel =

Costa Rican politician and lawyer

José Carlos Sáenz Esquivel (May 19, 1861 – April 4, 1919) was a Costa Rican politician and lawyer.

== Personal life ==
Jose Carlos Esquivel Sáenz, was born in Liberia, Costa Rica on May 19, 1861. The son of Vicente Sáenz Llorente and Marcelina Esquivel y Fernández, he married Úrsula Celina Herrera y Paut, daughter of José Ana Herrera y Zeledón and Rafaela Nicolasa Paut y Alcázar. From this marriage were born Antonio José, Ana Maria, Maria Carlos, Carmen Maria Amparo Maria Dolores, Celina and Carlos Sáenz Herrera. His son Carlos Sáenz Herrera became Vice President of Costa Rica.

== Career ==
He graduated as a Bachelor of Law at the University of Santo Tomas. He held Diplomatic office to Costa Rica in the United States and Germany. From 1891 to 1892 he was Secretary of Foreign Affairs and was responsible as Chancellor in 1892.

He served in the Supreme Court of Costa Rica from 1917 until his death in 1919.
