= 1948 Costa Rican general election =

- 8 February 1948
- Presidential election
- Registered: 176,979
- Turnout: 56.15% (▼27.73pp)
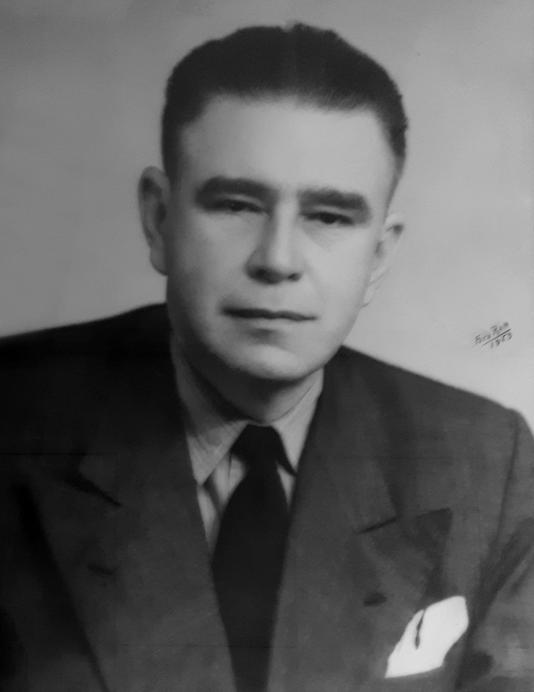

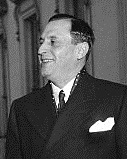
Nominee	Otilio Ulate Blanco	Rafael Ángel Calderón Guardia
Party	PUN	PRN
Alliance	National Compaction	Victory Bloc
Popular vote	54,931	44,438
Percentage	55.28%	44.72%
- Results by province
President before election
Teodoro Picado
PRN
Elected President
Otilio Ulate (Note: Although Otilio Ulate Blanco was declared the winner by the National Electoral Tribunal, the Constitutional Congress annulled the presidential election results on 1 March 1948. Following the Civil War, Ulate's election was recognized by the Founding Junta of the Second Republic and ratified by the National Constituent Assembly in 1949.)
PUN
- Legislative election
- 23 of the 46 seats in the Constitutional Congress
- Turnout: 54.40% (▼9.93pp)
Party	Leader	Vote %	Seats	+/–
PUN	Otilio Ulate Blanco	42.80	9	New
PRN	Rafael Ángel Calderón Guardia	42.57	9	−3
PVP	Manuel Mora Valverde	12.83	5	+3
This lists parties that won seats. See the complete results below.
Results by province

General elections were held in Costa Rica on 8 February 1948. Otilio Ulate Blanco of the National Union Party won the presidential race with 55% of the vote, defeating former president Rafael Ángel Calderón Guardia of the governing National Republican Party, which had held the presidency since 1932. However, after the National Electoral Tribunal declared Ulate the winner, the Constitutional Congress voted to annul the presidential results while allowing the legislative election to stand. The decision provoked a political crisis that culminated in the Costa Rican Civil War.

The victory of José Figueres Ferrer's National Liberation Army in the conflict led to the establishment of the Founding Junta of the Second Republic, which governed the country on a de facto basis from May 1948 to November 1949. During this period, the results of the legislative election were also set aside, a National Constituent Assembly was elected to draft a new constitution, and power was ultimately transferred to Ulate Blanco in accordance with the Ulate–Figueres Pact. The election was the last held under the 1871 Constitution.

== Campaign ==
In 1944, four days after the elections were over while celebrating the triumph of Teodoro Picado, Calderón's candidacy was announced for the next elections.

The principal opposition parties organized themselves into the National Compaction, an electoral coalition comprising the Democratic Party, the National Union Party, and the Social Democratic Party. To select a unified candidate, the coalition held a convention in which Fernando Castro Cervantes represented the Democrats, Otilio Ulate Blanco the National Union Party, and José Figueres Ferrer the Social Democrats. Figueres was eliminated in the first round of voting, and his supporters subsequently backed Ulate, who secured the nomination in the second round. Following the convention, Figueres was appointed chief of action for the coalition and Mario Echandi Jiménez became its secretary-general. Calderón was formally nominated by the National Republican Party on 23 March 1947 at the Republican Convention.

The election was the first to be supervised by the newly established National Electoral Tribunal, created in 1946 to provide greater independence in the administration of elections and to address long-standing opposition concerns regarding government influence over the electoral process. Nevertheless, the tribunal's powers remained limited, as final authority over electoral disputes continued to rest with the Constitutional Congress.

The campaign unfolded in an atmosphere of increasing political polarization. Clashes occurred between opposition youth organizations affiliated with the National Compaction and the Communist Brigades allied with the government ("caldero-communists"), particularly during debates in Congress concerning funding for electoral institutions.

A central issue of the campaign was the future of the Social Guarantees, the labor and social welfare reforms enacted during the administrations of Calderón Guardia and Teodoro Picado Michalski. Opposition leaders maintained that these reforms would be preserved under a National Compaction government, while supporters of Calderón argued that their continued implementation required the victory of the governing coalition.

Political tensions intensified during the final months of the campaign. In Cartago, a traditional opposition stronghold, strikes and protests challenged local authorities and prompted President Picado to replace several provincial officials. The government also faced the nationwide huelga de brazos caídos ("arms-down strike"), a major protest movement organized by opposition sectors. Confrontations associated with the political crisis resulted in numerous casualties and further heightened tensions ahead of the election.

== Results ==
=== President ===
Candidate	Party	Votes	%
Otilio Ulate Blanco	National Union Party	54,931	55.28
Rafael Ángel Calderón Guardia	National Republican Party	44,438	44.72
Total		99,369	100.00
Valid votes		99,369	100.00
Invalid/blank votes		0	0.00
Total votes		99,369	100.00
Registered voters/turnout		176,979	56.15
Source: Nohlen

=== Constitutional Congress ===
Half the seats in the Constitutional Congress of Costa Rica were up for election.

Party	Votes	%	Seats	+/–
National Union Party	41,211	42.80	9	New
National Republican Party	40,984	42.57	9	–3
People's Vanguard Party	12,353	12.83	5	+3
Labor Party	807	0.84	0	New
Republican Party	558	0.58	0	New
Agricultural Party	194	0.20	0	New
Workers' Party	174	0.18	0	New
Total	96,281	100.00	23	0
Valid votes	96,281	100.00		
Invalid/blank votes	0	0.00		
Total votes	96,281	100.00		
Registered voters/turnout	176,979	54.40		
Source: TSE

== Aftermath ==
On 28 February 1948, the National Electoral Tribunal issued its ruling on the presidential election. The decision was accompanied by a majority opinion signed by magistrates Gerardo Guzmán and José María Vargas, and a dissenting opinion authored by magistrate Max Koberg. The majority concluded that the reported irregularities were insufficient to alter the outcome of the election and recognized Otilio Ulate Blanco as president-elect. The dissenting opinion, however, argued that significant inconsistencies existed in the electoral records, including a discrepancy of approximately 14,000 votes between the presidential and legislative tallies, and recommended the annulment of the election.

The matter was subsequently referred to the Constitutional Congress, where it became the subject of intense debate. Deputies aligned with the governing Calderonista coalition and the communist bloc supported annulment, while opposition legislators defended the validity of the result. Ultimately, Congress voted to adopt the minority report by 27 votes to 19, thereby annulling the presidential election. The legislative elections, in which the governing coalition had won a majority of seats, were not annulled. The decision became one of the most controversial aspects of the electoral dispute, as opposition leaders argued that the irregularities cited in support of annulling the presidential vote would likewise have affected the legislative results.

The annulment of the presidential election became the immediate catalyst for the Costa Rican Civil War. On 12 March 1948, forces led by José Figueres Ferrer launched an armed uprising against the outgoing government of President Teodoro Picado Michalski, initiating a conflict that lasted 44 days. Following the victory of Figueres' National Liberation Army, the Founding Junta of the Second Republic assumed power and governed the country on a de facto basis for eighteen months. In accordance with the Ulate–Figueres Pact, the Junta transferred power to Otilio Ulate Blanco on 8 November 1949, after the adoption of a new constitution.
