= Virgilio Calvo Sánchez =

Costa Rican politician (1920–1988)

Second Vice President of Costa Rica
- In office 8 May 1966 – 8 May 1970 Serving with Jorge Vega Rodríguez
- President: José Joaquín Trejos Fernández
- Preceded by: Carlos Sáenz Herrera
- Succeeded by: Jorge Rossi Chavarría

Deputy of the Legislative Assembly of Costa Rica
- In office 1 May 1962 – 30 April 1966
- Preceded by: Fabio Fournier Jiménez
- Succeeded by: Fernando Trejos Escalante
- Constituency: San José (11th Office)

Personal details
- Born: Virgilio Calvo Sánchez; 26 August 1920 Alajuela, Costa Rica
- Died: 16 March 1988 (aged 67) San José, Costa Rica
- Party: National Front (1969–1974)
- Other political affiliations: UN (1965–1969); PRN (before 1965)
- Spouse: Rosa Murillo Porras (m. 1947)
- Education: Columbia University

Virgilio Calvo Sánchez (26 August 1920 – 16 March 1988) was a Costa Rican lawyer and politician who served as Second Vice President of Costa Rica from 1966 to 1970 under the administration of José Joaquín Trejos Fernández.
