= Jorge Vega Rodríguez =

Costa Rican politician (1904–2001)

First Vice President of Costa Rica
- In office 8 May 1966 – 8 May 1970 Serving with Virgilio Calvo Sánchez
- President: José Joaquín Trejos Fernández
- Preceded by: Raúl Blanco Cervantes
- Succeeded by: Manuel Aguilar Bonilla

Personal details
- Born: 1904 San José, Costa Rica
- Died: 2001 (aged 96–97)
- Parents: Domingo Vega Mogollón (father); Ninfa Rodríguez Gutiérrez (mother)

Jorge Vega Rodríguez (1904–2001) was a Costa Rican politician and doctor who served as First Vice President of Costa Rica from 1966 to 1970 under the administration of José Joaquín Trejos Fernández.
