= Popular Democratic Action =

Costa Rican political party

Popular Democratic Action (Spanish: Acción Democrática Popular) was a political party in Costa Rica, founded in 1962 by left-wing members of the National Liberation Party. Prominent founders were Enrique Obregón Valverde, Marcial Aguiluz Orellana and Julio Sunol. The party received some support from the then-illegal communist party. The party won two seats in the elections that year, although Valverde received less than 1% of the vote in the presidential election. Sunol later left the party.
