= Comunismo a la tica =

Variant of communist thought

Comunismo a la tica (also known in Spanish as comunismo criollo) is a variant of communist thought developed by the Costa Rican politician Manuel Mora Valverde, that he sought to promote a communism different from that imposed by Moscow and the Comintern, and that, on the contrary, was based, according to him, "on Costa Rican democratic, pacifist and institutional principles, traditions and values".

== Characterization ==
Manuel Mora Valverde at one point was critical of the doctrine imposed by the Soviet Union on communist parties around the world, and especially Stalinism, but without approaching Trotskyism as it used to be. Mora, on the contrary, sought to carry out a socialist reform in Costa Rica through democratic elections and respecting certain Costa Rican traditions such as the Catholic religion.

Likewise, according to Mora, his proposal for communism not only supports the existence of a democratic regime, but also defends a deepening of democracy with an economic content.

Regarding the economic aspect, Mora maintained that he was not an enemy of small property, but of large property, as it is usually formed by destroying small property. Although he, likewise, affirmed that he did not have the immediate abolition of large property, but that it should be regulated "for the benefit of the people."

The more moderate positions of Mora and his followers led them into increasing confrontations with other more orthodox communist leaders such as Humberto Vargas Carbonell who wanted to make the changes through revolutionary and radical means. This led, finally, to a fracture of Costa Rican communism that was divided into two blocks; Mora Valverde, who founded the Costa Rican People's Party, and Vargas Carbonell, who maintained control over Popular Vanguard.

== See also ==
- Social democracy
- Democratic socialism
- Christian socialism
- Christian communism
- Economic democracy
- Workplace democracy
- Workers' self-management
