= Alberto Oreamuno Flores =

Costa Rican physician and politician

First Vice President of Costa Rica
- In office 8 November 1949 – 8 November 1953 Serving with Alfredo Volio Mata
- President: Otilio Ulate Blanco
- Preceded by: Office established
- Succeeded by: Raúl Blanco Cervantes

Deputy of the Constitutional Congress
- In office 1 May 1936 – 30 April 1940
- Constituency: Limón Province

Personal details
- Born: Julio Alberto José de Jesús Oreamuno Flores; 9 August 1905 Cartago, Costa Rica
- Died: 28 October 1980 (aged 75)
- Party: PUN
- Education: University of Pennsylvania (MBBS)
- Occupation: Physician; politician; professor

Julio Alberto José de Jesús Oreamuno Flores (9 August 1905 – 28 October 1980) was a Costa Rican physician and politician who served as First Vice President of Costa Rica from 1949 to 1953. A member of the National Union Party, he previously served in the Constitutional Congress from 1936 to 1940.

He was born in the province of Cartago, son of Nicolás Oreamuno and Adelfia Flores. His father was Minister of State, president of the Central American Court of Justice and president of the Supreme Court of Justice of Costa Rica, and his brother José Rafael Oreamuno Flores was ambassador of Costa Rica in the United States.

He studied at the National Institute of Honduras, at the Liceo de Costa Rica and at the Lafayette Lyceum in Weston, Pennsylvania, United States. He later went to the Jefferson Medical College at the University of Pennsylvania where he graduated with honors in 1929, obtaining the therapeutic medal for the best exam among 122 students. He made his internship at Frankford Hospital in the same city.

He returned to Costa Rica in 1930 where he worked as a doctor of the United Fruit Company, then deputy director of the Hospital of Limón, Hospital Almirante and Clínica Bíblica. He also worked at the Armoides Hospital in Panama, the Piera Hospital in Honduras and the Hospital San Juan de Dios of Costa Rica. He was also a councilor of the Municipal Council of Limón and deputy, and then served as vice president of Costa Rica in the administration of Otilio Ulate Blanco, being elected in a 1949 special election. He was also a professor at the Faculty of Medicine of Honduras.

He married Elizabeth Robinson Oreamuno, a school teacher from Pennsylvania. In 1940, she established the USA Woman's Club of Costa Rica which still exists today as the Women's Club of Costa Rica.
