= Hospital Nacional de Niños =

Geography
- Location: San José, Costa Rica
- Coordinates: 9.934394°N 84.087610°W

Organisation
- Type: Specialist

Services
- Beds: 250
- Speciality: Pediatrics

History
- Opened: 1845

Links
- Website: www.hnn.sa.cr
- Lists: Hospitals in Costa Rica

Hospital Nacional de Niños is a national pediatric hospital in San José, Costa Rica. It has provided medical care to children in the country since its founding in 1845.

In 1945 and as one of the events to celebrate the centennial of the San José Hospital, a new ward opened with a capacity of 140 beds. The polio epidemic that struck the child population in Costa Rica in 1954 caused the hospital to face serious problems generated by the unexpected rise in the number of patients.

The hospital is recognized by HEALTH Without Damage, an international coalition of over 473 organizations in 53 countries working to transform the field of health care.

The hospital has approximately 250 beds and treats children under the age of 13.
