= Francisco Orlich Bolmarcich =

President of Costa Rica from 1962 to 1966

Francisco Orlich Bolmarcich OYC
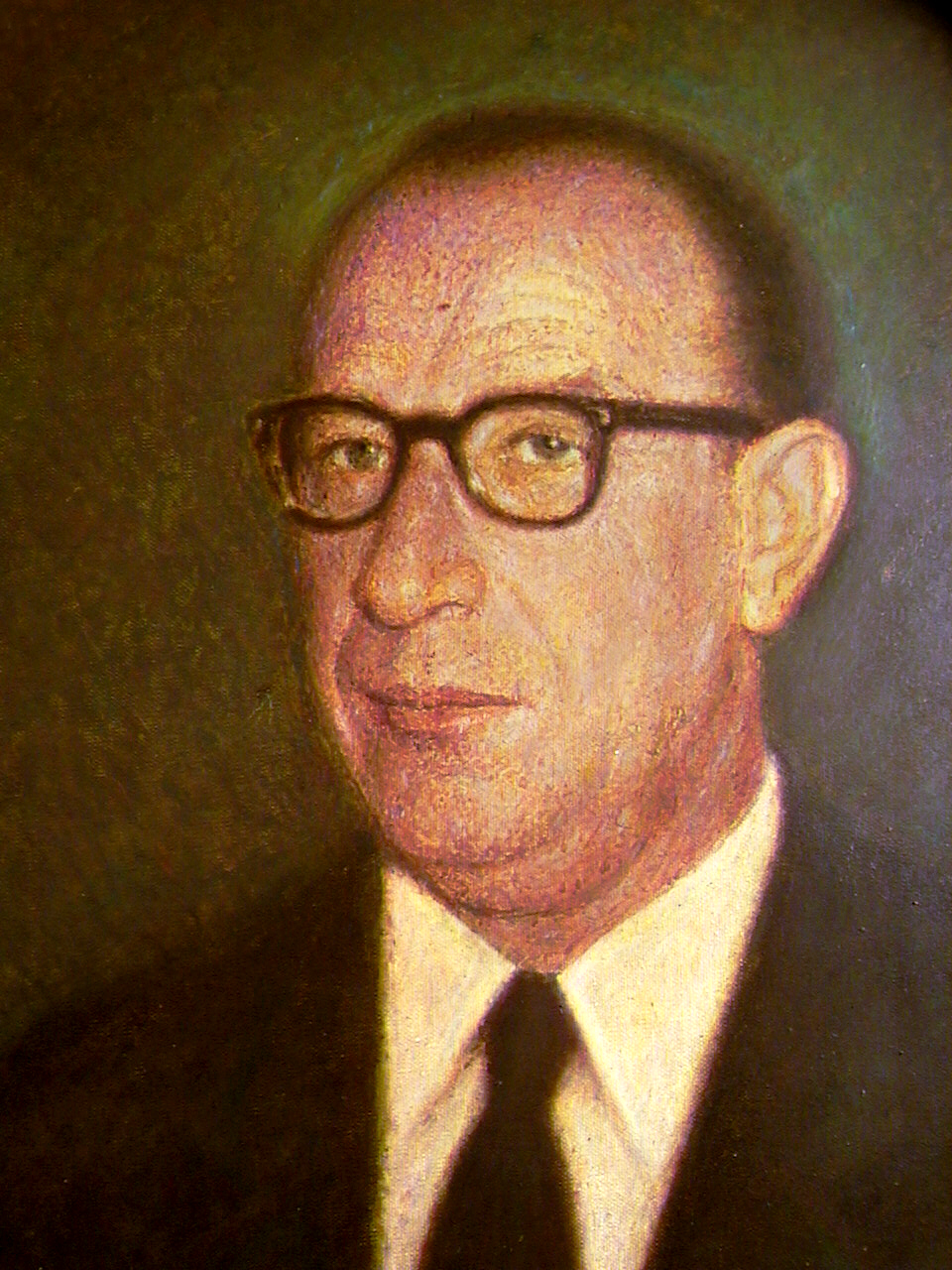

34th President of Costa Rica
- In office 8 May 1962 – 8 May 1966
- Vice President: Raúl Blanco Cervantes; Carlos Sáenz Herrera
- Preceded by: Mario Echandi Jiménez
- Succeeded by: José Joaquín Trejos Fernández

Minister of Public Works and Transport
- In office 8 November 1953 – 1957
- President: José Figueres Ferrer
- Preceded by: Carlos Rojas Quirós
- Succeeded by: Carlos Espinach Escalante

Deputy of the Legislative Assembly of Costa Rica
- In office 1 November 1953 – 8 November 1953
- Preceded by: Antonio Peña Chavarría
- Succeeded by: Daniel Oduber Quirós
- Constituency: San José (1st Office)

President of the National Liberation Party
- In office April 1952 – April 1956
- Preceded by: Position established
- Succeeded by: María Teresa Obregón Zamora

Secretary of Public Works
- In office 23 April 1948 – 8 November 1949
- President: Santos León Herrera (acting); José Figueres Ferrer
- Preceded by: Office established
- Succeeded by: Hernán Azofeifa Víquez

Deputy of the Constitutional Congress
- In office 1 May 1946 – 30 April 1948
- Constituency: San José Province
- In office 1 May 1940 – 30 April 1944
- Constituency: San José Province

Additional positions
- 1938–1940: Municipal President of San Ramón

Personal details
- Born: Francisco José Orlich Bolmarcich; 10 March 1907 San Ramón, Alajuela, Costa Rica
- Died: 29 October 1969 (aged 62) San José, Costa Rica
- Party: PLN (from 1951)
- Other political affiliations: Social Democratic (1946–1951); Democratic (1946); PRN (before 1946)
- Spouse: Marita Camacho Quirós (m. 1932)
- Children: 2
- Occupation: Politician; farmer; shoemaker; businessman
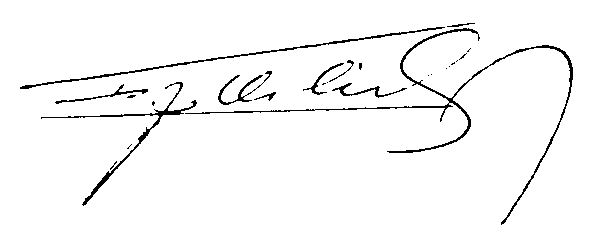
- Signature
- Nickname: Don Chico

Francisco José Orlich Bolmarcich (10 March 1907 – 29 October 1969) was a Costa Rican businessman and politician who served as the 34th President of Costa Rica from 1962 to 1966.

== Biography ==
He was an ethnic Croat, a descendant of Croatian settlers from the town of Punat on the island of Krk, Croatia.

Together with his brothers he founded in 1928 FJ Orlich & Hnos Ltda. (FJ Orlich & Brothers Limited). At first a large supply store in his hometown of San Ramón, this eventually grew to become one of Costa Rica's largest coffee firms. His half-brother, Franjo J. Orlich, the namesake of the firm, moved from Costa Rica to Pennsylvania and worked for Bethlehem Steel as a Pattern Maker in the Castings Plant. A long-time friend of José Figueres Ferrer, with whom he had traveled together to study in the United States, Orlich was Figueres' second in command within the National Liberation Army in the Costa Rican Civil War.

Following that, the National Liberation Party was founded in the Orlich family farm in La Paz, San Ramón. He twice served as Public Works Minister (1948–1949, 1953–1957) in Figueres' cabinets. Afterwards he ran for president in 1958, but lost to Mario Echandi Jiménez. He ran again in 1962, against the defeated 1948 leader Dr Rafael Ángel Calderón Guardia, and won the presidency.

He was one of the signatories of the agreement to convene a convention for drafting a world constitution.

As a result, for the first time in human history, a World Constituent Assembly convened to draft and adopt the Constitution for the Federation of Earth.

During his presidency he faced the major eruption of the Irazú volcano, that started just as U.S. President John F. Kennedy was visiting Costa Rica and lasted for over a year, causing major agricultural damage and landslides in the city of Cartago.

== Death ==
He died of a stroke on 29 October 1969 in San José, at the age of 62. His widow, Marita Camacho Quirós, lived to be 114 years old. This made her the oldest living person ever in Costa Rica, and the oldest former First Lady in the world. She outlived her husband by over 55 years.

Political offices
Preceded by Mario Echandi Jiménez	President of Costa Rica; 1962–1966	Succeeded by José Joaquín Trejos Fernández
