= Manuel Mora (politician) =

Costa Rican politician (1909–1994)

Manuel Mora Valverde OFP
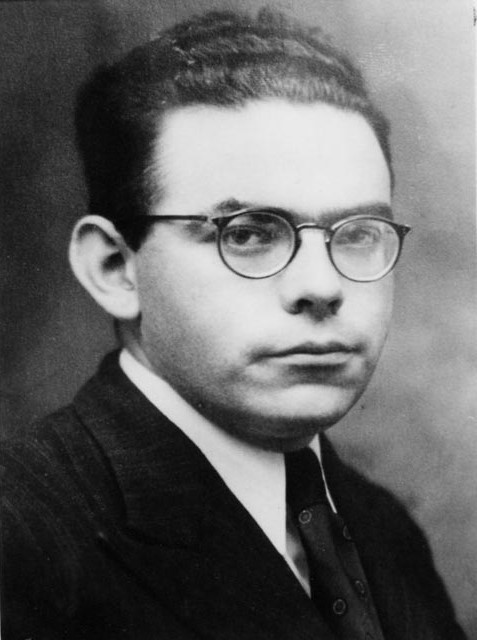

1st Secretary-General of the People's Vanguard Party
- In office 1943–1984

Deputy of the Legislative Assembly of Costa Rica
- In office 1 May 1970 – 30 April 1974
- Preceded by: Luis Alberto Azofeifa Solfa
- Succeeded by: Eduardo Mora Valverde
- Constituency: San José (18th office)

Deputy of the Constitutional Congress
- In office 1 May 1934 – 30 April 1948
- Constituency: San José Province

Personal details
- Born: Manuel Luis Mora Valverde; 27 August 1909 San José, Costa Rica
- Died: 29 December 1994 (aged 85) San José, Costa Rica
- Party: Socialist Action Party (1968–1994)
- Other political affiliations: People's Vanguard Party (1931–1984); Costa Rican People's Party
- Relations: Patricia Mora Castellanos (niece)
- Children: 1

Manuel Luis Mora Valverde (27 August 1909 – 29 December 1994) was a Costa Rican lawyer, politician and labor leader who played a central role in the development of the country's labor movement and social reform agenda during the mid-20th century. He was a founding figure of organized communism in Costa Rica and remained an influential actor in national politics for several decades.

Born in San José, Mora helped found the Workers and Farmers Party in 1931, which was later renamed the People's Vanguard Party (Partido Vanguardia Popular). As a political leader and legislator, he was closely associated with the Social Guarantees enacted during the 1940s, including labor protections and the expansion of social welfare legislation. He was elected as a deputy to the Constitutional Congress for San José in 1934, and re-elected in 1938, 1942 and 1946. He was also a presidential candidate for the 1940 and 1974 elections.

Mora is widely credited with providing the principal theoretical foundations for what became known as Comunismo a la tica ("Costa Rican-style communism"), an anti-dogmatic current within the country's leftist movement which emphasized adapting Marxist principles to Costa Rica's specific social, political, and cultural context rather than adhering strictly to orthodox or externally directed models. It was characterized by participation in electoral politics, engagement with democratic institutions, and the pursuit of social reforms through legal and parliamentary means.

In recognition of his contributions to the labor movement and to the establishment of Costa Rica's welfare state, Mora was awarded the honorary title of Benemérito de la Patria by the Legislative Assembly in 1998.

== See also ==
- Social Guarantees
