= Democratic Party (Costa Rica) =

Political party in Costa Rica

The Democratic Party (Spanish: Partido Demócrata) was a political party in Costa Rica.

The first time the name was used was during the 1919 elections following the coup that overturned the two-years long dictatorship of Federico Tinoco and was used by Tinoco’s followers, losing the election. Later it endorsed the candidacy of León Cortés Castro in 1944, losing again. The party endorsed Otilio Ulate as part of one unified opposition candidacy in 1948. That was claimed as successful but the denial of the results by the government caused that year's civil war. Following the civil war the party contested with wealthy industrialist Fernando Cervantes as their candidate against socialist (and former member of the party's left-wing) José Figueres of the newly founded National Liberation Party, resulting in a defeat for Cervantes. After that the party would disappear and many of its members (including Otto Cortés, León Cortés’ son) became members of National Liberation.
