= Rafael Ángel Calderón Guardia =

President of Costa Rica from 1940 to 1944

Rafael Ángel Calderón
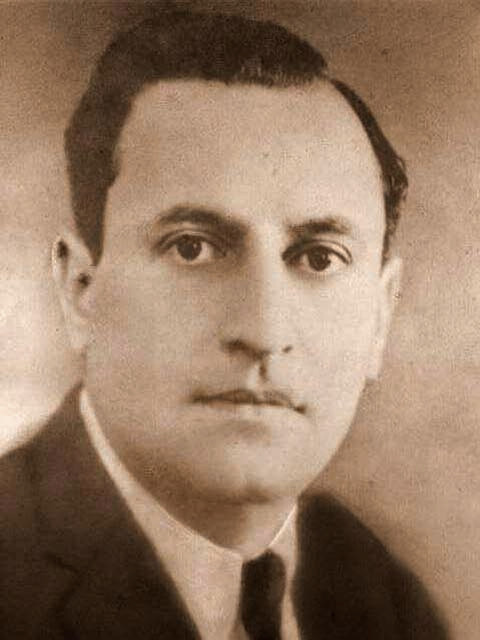

29th President of Costa Rica
- In office 8 May 1940 – 8 May 1944
- Preceded by: León Cortés Castro
- Succeeded by: Teodoro Picado Michalski

Deputy of the Legislative Assembly of Costa Rica
- In office 1 May 1958 – 30 April 1962
- Preceded by: Oldemar Chavarría Chinchilla
- Succeeded by: Jorge Montero Castro
- Constituency: San José (6th Office)

President of the Constitutional Congress
- In office 1 May 1938 – 30 April 1940
- Preceded by: Juan Rafael Arias Bonilla
- Succeeded by: Otto Cortés Fernández

Deputy of the Constitutional Congress
- In office 1 May 1934 – 30 April 1940
- Constituency: San José Province

Personal details
- Born: Rafael Ángel Calderón Guardia; 8 March 1900 San José, Costa Rica
- Died: 9 June 1970 (aged 70) San José, Costa Rica
- Party: National Republican Party
- Spouse(s): Yvonne Clays Spoelders (m. 1927–1945); divorced Rosario Fournier Mora (m. 1947–1970); his death
- Children: Rafael Ángel, Jr. (1949–), Alejandra Calderon Fournier (1954–1979), Maria Calderon Fournier (1960–)
- Parent(s): Rafael Calderón Muñoz and Ana María Guardia Mora
- Education: Université catholique de Louvain; Université libre de Bruxelles
- Profession: Physician
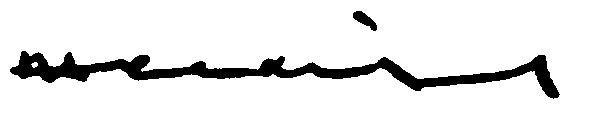
- Signature

Rafael Ángel Calderón Guardia (8 March 1900 – 9 June 1970) was a Costa Rican physician and politician who served as the 29th President of Costa Rica from 1940 to 1944. The founder of Calderonism, he had previously represented San José in the Constitutional Congress from 1934 to 1940.

== Early life ==
Rafael Angel Calderón Guardia was born on 8 March 1900 in San José. In his youth, Calderón Guardia studied in Costa Rica, France and Belgium, where he married Yvonne Clays Spoelders, who was later to be the first female diplomat of Costa Rica. After finishing his studies in Belgium, Calderón Guardia became a medical doctor and practicing surgeon, which he would remain for most of his life, even after serving as president.

He became the Municipal President of San José at the age of 30 and in 1934 he won a seat in congress as a member of the National Republican Party before being backed as a presidential candidate by then President León Cortés Castro in 1940.

== Presidency ==
In 1940, with the support of conservative coffee elites, Calderón was elected President of Costa Rica. Shortly after becoming president-elect, he met with American President Franklin Delano Roosevelt and his wife Eleanor on March 25 and 26 of that year in Washington, D.C.

Prior to Calderón, Costa Rican Presidents, while democratically elected, had largely supported the interests of the conservative coffee oligarchy.

Calderón soon turned his back on the conservative coffee elite to address widespread poverty and poor health conditions among the working poor. He became the first Central American president to primarily focus his attention on poverty and deteriorating social conditions.

Calderon Guardia responded to the demand for reform when he assumed the presidency in 1940, and, in doing so, he offered the electorate a viable alternative to the Communist solutions to social questions. His inaugural address outlined measures by which his government proposed to foment the social, cultural and economic development of the nation. He promised particular attention to the less well developed areas of Costa Rica, such as Guanacaste and the Atlantic region which had been largely abandoned by the United Fruit Company. He pledged himself to a revision of the entire system of taxation on the just basis of capacity to contribute. He promised to give a new impulse to rural credit, to provide for a program of land distribution through the National Bank, and to initiate a program of low-cost housing. He proposed to found a national university that would orient public opinion on social questions and promote the general progress of the republic. As contribution to the welfare of all, he promised to institute a modern system of social security.

During his presidency he established the Work Code, which introduced the minimum wage, and other important protections for laborers. Prior to this reform, working conditions for Costa Rica's poor had been abhorrent. Calderón also founded the CCSS, a national social security retirement program, extremely advanced for its time. He also instituted a national healthcare program. In education, he established the University of Costa Rica.

To this day, Costa Rica has been well known around the world for its system of universal health care, its high education levels, and the social security system founded under Calderón.

Calderón also brought Costa Rica into World War II on the Allied side and cooperated with the United States. During the war his government imprisoned many Costa Ricans of German descent and confiscated many of their assets including large coffee plantations and banking businesses. This made him very unpopular with the powerful German minority in the country. Many German families and their descendants would later become backers of Calderón's rival, José Figueres Ferrer.

In spite of exigencies of war, the Calderón Guardia government realized prodigious advances for the nation. It sponsored comprehensive programs that included, among others, the Law for New Industries to encourage diversification of the economy; the creation of the Social Security System and enactment of the Labor Code; the pragmatic Land Law, the so-called Law of Parasites, which allowed the landless to acquire title to land on the promise of cultivating it, and a simple but effective program of distributing free shoes to needy children in the first grade to protect their feet against parasites and to help abate the feelings of inferiority produced by the lack of such a basic item. These and other measures were sponsored by Calderon Guardia to build the infrastructure of a socially oriented national economy and to deal, simultaneously and directly, with the pressing needs of the most deprived members of the Costa Rican family.

Calderón developed strong ties with labor organizations, certain important figures of the Catholic Church, such as the progressive Archbishop Víctor Sanabria, and the Communist Party, led by Manuel Mora. This unlikely alliance was strong enough to transform the country's labor laws, its health and education systems, and its economic structure. He enjoyed wide support among the poor, but a growing coalition of land owners, industrialists, military leaders, and conservative Church officials strongly opposed him, polarizing society.

Calderon Guardia headed a traditional party which included elements from all segments of society. He attracted a following among the masses of society such as no previous political figure had ever achieved.

From 1940 forward, the various contestants in the political arena could not disregard Calderon Guardia's functioning program with its sharp focus on social issues. He was determined, even if it entailed intimidation, to carry out his plans. His program and the methods he used to put it into effect therefore became inextricable parts of the social issue. His work of reform challenged the domination of the elite, which consequently became politically more active, aware and cohesive.

== Picado Years ==
In 1944, Calderón supported Teodoro Picado Michalski to succeed him as president. Picado was also backed by Archbishop Sanabria, and the former Communist leader Manuel Mora in the 1944 election. There were accusations of government fraud during the election, which was a usual practice in Costa Rica. However, Picado's 2:1 margin of victory suggests that he would have won regardless of these instances. Picado's presidency was quieter and more conciliatory than that of Calderón. But both Calderón and his enemies were preparing for the upcoming showdown in 1948, when Calderón would be constitutionally eligible again to run for president.

== The Costa Rican Civil War of 1948 ==
In 1948, Calderón ran for president again. Otilio Ulate Blanco defeated him by 10,000 votes in a very questionable election (since Calderon's party actually received more votes for Congress than Ulate's party at a time when the Costa Rican society was heavily polarized, suggesting the non-likelihood of a "split vote"). Ulate was proclaimed winner by the two of three members of the Electoral Board. However, the Congress, controlled by Calderón's party, declared the election to be null and void and that a new election would be held.

Historians Molina and Lehoucq show in Stuffing the Ballot Box: Fraud Electoral Reform, And Democratization in Costa Rica (Cambridge University Press) that leaders of the Republican Party and the PUN agreed to end the civil war and to have Dr. Julio Cesar Ovares rule as interim president for two years and then the TNE would hold new elections; but when this plan was presented to Figueres, he rejected its terms and instead continued to lead his army and win the civil war.

The charismatic José Figueres Ferrer launched a coup against Picado's government in 1948. In the civil war, the Picado government forces were backed by the communists who believed that Ulate was a threat to the social legislation that had been established under Calderon Guardia's government. After 2,000 deaths, the civil war ended and Figueres seized power. Figueres is noted for seizing power by force, establishing the framework for a successful modern Democracy (which lasts to this day), disbanding the military, and then relinquishing power. He went on to become a democratically elected president on two occasions with his National Liberation Party (named after his National Liberation Army). Figueres is celebrated as a national hero in Costa Rica to this day, while Calderón's image remains diminished, in spite of his crucial social reforms.

Upon the victory of Figueres' armed forces, Calderón fled to Nicaragua and then to Mexico where he worked again as a doctor to support his family. In 1958, Calderón Guardia was allowed to return to Costa Rica and was elected as congressman, but he did not serve as such. He ran for the presidency again in 1962 but lost. He was also named ambassador to Mexico (1966–1970). He died in 1970.

His son, Rafael Ángel Calderón Fournier, founded a new party in 1984 and became president of Costa Rica fifty years after his father did in 1990 in a transformed Costa Rican society and with a much more right-wing approach to governing. His daughter Alejandra became a left-wing political activist whose career on a socialist platform was cut short after a deadly road accident in 1979. And his youngest daughter Maria del Rosario became an author and educator. Calderon Guardia's second wife Rosario Fournier Mora survived her husband until 1999 when she died at 79.

Calderón Guardia remains one of the most controversial figures in Costa Rican history. His characterization as Figueres' primary antagonist served to strengthen this position in favor of the pro-Figueres consensus of having Figueres the "hero of the revolution" after the Figueristas won the civil war. Thus, while his social reforms had an enormous impact on Costa Rica, after the congress made the elections of 1948 void and his failed attempts to regain power in 1948 and 1962 hurt his reputation.

== See also ==
- Social Guarantees

== Notes ==
Political offices
Preceded by León Cortés Castro; 1936–1940	President of Costa Rica; 1940–1944	Succeeded by Teodoro Picado Michalski; 1944–1948
