= List of deputies of Costa Rica, 2022–2026 =

Members of the Legislative Assembly of Costa Rica, as elected in the 2022 Costa Rican general election on 6 February 2022 and 3 April 2022.

- = National Liberation Party (PLN) (19)
- Social Democratic Progress Party (PPSD) (10)
- = Social Christian Unity Party (PUSC) (9)
- = New Republic Party (PNR) (7)
- Liberal Progressive Party (PLP) (6)
- Broad Front (PFA) (6)

Legislative Assembly of Costa Rica 2022-2026
Constituency	Deputy	Parliamentary Fraction
San José
San José	Rodrigo Arias Sánchez	PLN
San José	Andrea Álvarez Marín	PLN
San José	Danny Vargas Serrano	PLN
San José	Carolina Delgado Ramírez	PLN
San José	Gilbert Jiménez Siles	PLN
San José	Pilar Cisneros Gallo	PPSD
San José	Waldo Agüero Sanabria	PPSD
San José	Luz Mary Alpízar Loaiza	PPSD
San José	Manuel Esteban Morales Díaz	PPSD
San José	Eliécer Feinzaig Mintz	PLP
San José	Kattia Cambronero Aguiluz	PLP
San José	Jorge Eduardo Dengo Rosabal	PLP
San José	Sofía Alejandra Guillén Pérez	PFA
San José	Andrés Ariel Robles Barrantes	PFA
San José	Rocío Alfaro Molina	PFA
San José	Fabricio Alvarado Muñoz	PNR
San José	Gloria Navas Montero	PNR
San José	Carlos Felipe García Molina	PUSC
San José	Vanessa de Paul Castro Mora	PUSC
Alajuela	Dinorah Barquero Barquero	PLN
Alajuela	José Joaquín Hernández Rojas	PLN
Alajuela	Monserrat Ruiz Guevara	PLN
Alajuela	María Marta Padilla Bonilla	PPSD
Alajuela	Jorge Antonio Rojas López	PPSD
Alajuela	María Daniela Rojas Salas	PUSC
Alajuela	Leslye Rubén Bojorges León	PUSC
Alajuela	Olga Lidia Morera Arrieta	PNR
Alajuela	José Pablo Sibaja Jiménez	PNR
Alajuela	Luis Diego Vargas Rodríguez	PLP
Alajuela	Priscilla Vindas Salazar	PFA
Cartago	Paulina María Ramírez Portuguez	PLN
Cartago	Óscar Izquierdo Sandí	PLN
Cartago	Rosaura Méndez Gamboa	PLN
Cartago	Alejandro José Pacheco Castro	PUSC
Cartago	Paola Nájera Abarca	PPSD
Cartago	Antonio José Ortega Gutiérrez	PFA
Cartago	Johana Obando Bonilla	PLP
Heredia	Kattia Rivera Soto	PLN
Heredia	Pedro Rojas Guzmán	PLN
Heredia	Ada Gabriela Acuña Castro	PPSD
Heredia	Gilberto Arnoldo Campos Cruz	PLP
Heredia	Horacio Alvarado Bogantes	PUSC
Heredia	Jonathan Acuña Soto	PFA
Guanacaste	Luis Fernando Mendoza Jiménez	PLN
Guanacaste	Alejandra Larios Trejos	PLN
Guanacaste	Melina Ajoy Palma	PUSC
Guanacaste	Daniel Gerardo Vargas Quirós	PPSD
Puntarenas	José Francisco Nicolás Alvarado	PLN
Puntarenas	Sonia Rojas Méndez	PLN
Puntarenas	David Lorenzo Segura Gamboa	PNR
Puntarenas	Carlos Andrés Robles Obando	PUSC
Puntarenas	Alexander Barrantes Chacón	PPSD
Limon	Geison Enrique Valverde Méndez	PLN
Limon	Katherine Andrea Moreira Brown	PLN
Limon	Yonder Andrey Salas Durán	PNR
Limon	Rosalía Brown Young	PNR
Limon	María Marta Carballo Arce	PUSC

== See also ==
- List of deputies of Costa Rica, 2018–2022
