= List of deputies of Costa Rica, 2018–2022 =

Members of the Legislative Assembly of Costa Rica.

- = National Liberation Party (PLN)
- = Citizens' Action Party (PAC)
- = Social Christian Unity Party (PUSC)
- = National Restoration Party (PRN)
- = National Integration Party (PIN)
- = Social Christian Republican Party (PRSC)
- = Broad Front (FA)
- = Independent

Legislative Assembly of Costa Rica 2018-2022
Constituency	Nº	Deputy	Parliamentary Fraction	Major	Notes
San José
San José	1	Carlos Ricardo Benavides Jiménez	PLN	Law	
San José	2	Silvia Vanesa Hernández Sánchez	PLN	Economy	
San José	3	Wagner Alberto Jiménez Zúñiga	PLN	Education	
San José	4	Ana Karine Niño Gutiérrez	PLN	Law	
San José	5	Carlos Luis Avendaño Calvo	PRN	Religious pastor	
San José	6	Floria María Segreda Sagot	PRN	Law	
San José	7	Harllan Hoepelman Páez	Ind. (ex PRN)	Religious pastor	Joined New Republic Party on a personal capacity.
San José	8	Ivonne Acuña Cabrera	Ind. (ex PRN)	Psychology	
San José	9	Nielsen Pérez Pérez	PAC	Social work	
San José	10	Víctor Morales Mora	PAC	Law	
San José	11	Paola Viviana Vega Rodríguez	Ind. (ex PAC)	Political science	
San José	12	Enrique Sánchez Carballo	PAC	Journalism	Second openly homosexual legislator after Carmen Muñoz from the 2010-2014 period.
San José	13	María Vita Monge Granados	PUSC	Law	
San José	14	Pedro Muñoz Fonseca	PUSC	Law	
San José	15	Shirley Díaz Mejías	Ind. (ex PUSC)	Political science	Joined New Generation Party on a personal capacity, will run as vicepresidential candidate for that party for the 2022 elections.
San José	16	Walter Muñoz Céspedes	PIN	Medicine	
San José	17	Zoila Rosa Volio Pacheco	Ind. (ex PIN)	Law	
San José	18	José María Villalta Flórez-Estrada	FA	Law	
San José	19	Otto Roberto Vargas Víquez	PRSC	Entrepreneur	
Alajuela	1	Roberto Thompson Chacón	PLN	Law	
Alajuela	2	María José Corrales Chacón	PLN	Physical therapy	
Alajuela	3	Daniel Isaac Ulate Valenciano	PLN	Business administration	
Alajuela	4	Nidia Lorena Céspedes Cisneros	Ind. (ex PRN)	Preacher	Joined New Republic Party on a personal capacity.
Alajuela	5	Ignacio Alberto Alpízar Castro	Ind. (ex PRN)	Unknown	Joined New Republic Party on a personal capacity.
Alajuela	6	Carolina Hidalgo Herrera	PAC	Law	President
Alajuela	7	Luis Ramón Carranza Cascante	PAC	Journalism	
Alajuela	8	Erwen Masís Castro	PUSC	Law	
Alajuela	9	María Inés Solís Quirós	PUSC	Market	Vice-president
Alajuela	10	Erick Rodríguez Steller	Ind. (ex PIN)	Law and Economy	Joined New Generation Party on a personal capacity.
Alajuela	11	Dragos Dolanescu Valenciano	Ind. (ex PRSC)	Psychology	Creates and joins Costa Rica Fair party on a personal capacity.
Cartago	1	Mario Castillo Méndez	PAC	Editor	
Cartago	2	Laura Guido Pérez	PAC	Political science	
Cartago	3	Paola Valladares Rosado	PLN	Engineering	
Cartago	4	Luis Fernando Chacón Monge	PLN	Engineering	
Cartago	5	Pablo Heriberto Abarca Mora	PUSC	Business administration	
Cartago	6	Xiomara Priscilla Rodríguez Hernández	PRN	Unknown	
Cartago	7	Sylvia Patricia Villegas Álvarez	PIN	Education	
Heredia	1	Welmer Ramos González	PAC	Economy	
Heredia	2	Catalina Montero Gómez	PAC	Social work	
Heredia	3	Ana Lucía Delgado Orozco	PLN	Law	
Heredia	4	Jorge Luis Fonseca Fonseca	PLN	Law	
Heredia	5	Aracelly Salas Eduarte	PUSC	Secretary	
Heredia	6	Jonathan Prendas Rodríguez	Ind. (ex PRN)	Journalism	Joined New Republic Party on a personal capacity.
Guanacaste	1	Luis Antonio Aiza Campos	PLN	Medicine	
Guanacaste	2	Aida María Montiel Héctor	PLN	Law	
Guanacaste	3	Mileyde Alvarado Arias	PRN	Religious pastor	
Guanacaste	4	José María Guevara Navarrete	PUSC	Administration	Assumes position after death of Rodolfo Peña on 23 July 2021 due to complications from COVID-19
Puntarenas	1	Carmen Irene Chan Mora	Ind. (ex PRN)	Unknown	Joined New Republic Party on a personal capacity.
Puntarenas	2	Melvin Ángel Núñez Piña	PRN	Religious pastor	
Puntarenas	3	Franggi Nicolás Solano	PLN	Administration	
Puntarenas	4	Gustavo Viales Villegas	Ind. (ex PLN)	Administration	Quits the PLN fraction due to narcotraffic investigations surrounding he and his father, Carlos Viales Fallas, mayor of Corredores canton.
Puntarenas	5	Óscar Mauricio Cascante Cascante	PUSC	Education	
Limon	1	Eduardo Newton Cruickshank Smith	PRN	Law	
Limon	2	Marolin Raquel Azofeifa Trejos	Ind. (ex PRN)	Unknown	Joined New Republic Party on a personal capacity.
Limon	3	Giovanni Alberto Gómez Obando	PRN	Unknown	
Limon	4	Yorleny León Marchena	PLN	Administration	
Limon	5	David Hubert Gourzong Cerdas	PLN	Engineering	

== See also ==
- List of deputies of Costa Rica, 2022-2026
