= Andrea Álvarez =

Andrea Álvarez may refer to:

- Andrea Álvarez (musician) (born 1962), Argentinean musician
- Andrea Álvarez (footballer) (born 2003), Guatemalan footballer
- Andrea Álvarez Marín (born 1986), member of the Legislative Assembly of Costa Rica
