= Daniel Vargas =

Daniel Vargas may refer to:

- Daniel Vargas (runner) (born 1984), Mexican long-distance runner
- Daniel Vargas (volleyball) (born 1986), Mexican volleyball player
- Danny Vargas Serrano (born 1979), Costa Rican politician
