= Óscar López (Costa Rican politician) =

Costa Rican politician (born 1971)

Óscar López Arias
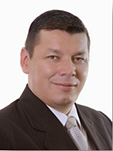
- Official portrait, 2014

Deputy of the Legislative Assembly of Costa Rica
- In office 1 May 2014 – 30 April 2018
- Preceded by: Luis Fishman Zonzinski
- Succeeded by: Zoila Volio Pacheco
- Constituency: San José (17th Office)
- In office 1 May 2006 – 30 April 2010
- Preceded by: Federico Malavassi Calvo
- Succeeded by: José María Villalta
- Constituency: San José (18th Office)

President of the Accessibility without Exclusion Party
- In office 21 August 2004 – 19 July 2024
- Preceded by: Party established
- Succeeded by: Vacant

Personal details
- Born: Óscar Andrés López Arias; 12 February 1971 (age 55) Curridabat, Costa Rica
- Party: PASE (since 2004)
- Children: 1
- Education: Distance State University (MA)
- Occupation: Lawyer; comedian; politician; radio personality

Óscar Andrés López Arias is a Costa Rican lawyer, comedian and politician who served as a deputy in the Legislative Assembly from 2006 to 2010 and again from 2014 to 2018. He is the founder of the Accessibility without Exclusion Party and was the first blind legislator in Latin America. López was also his party’s presidential candidate on four occasions between 2010 and 2022.

In addition to his legislative career, López ran for mayor of San José in the 2010 municipal elections. He subsequently continued to contest presidential and legislative elections as the leader of the Accessibility without Exclusion Party, generally receiving less than 1% of the presidential vote, although he was reelected to the Legislative Assembly for the 2014-2018 term. Following the party's defeat in the 2022 general election, López resigned from its presidency in July 2024.

Outside politics, López has worked as a stand-up comedian and public speaker. In 2015, he published the book 'Con los ojos del alma' ("With the Eyes of the Soul").
