= Victor Morales =

Victor Morales may refer to:

- Victor Morales (politician), Democratic politician in Texas
- Víctor Morales (Chilean footballer) (1905–1938), member of the 1930 Chilean World Cup squads
- Victor Morales (cyclist) (born 1943), Ecuadorian Olympic cyclist
- Víctor Hugo Morales, Uruguayan journalist
- Víctor Hugo Morales Zapata, Costa Rican politician
- Víctor Morales Mora, Costa Rican politician and lawyer
