= Cristian Tattenbach Iglesias =

Costa Rican lawyer and politician (1924–2007)

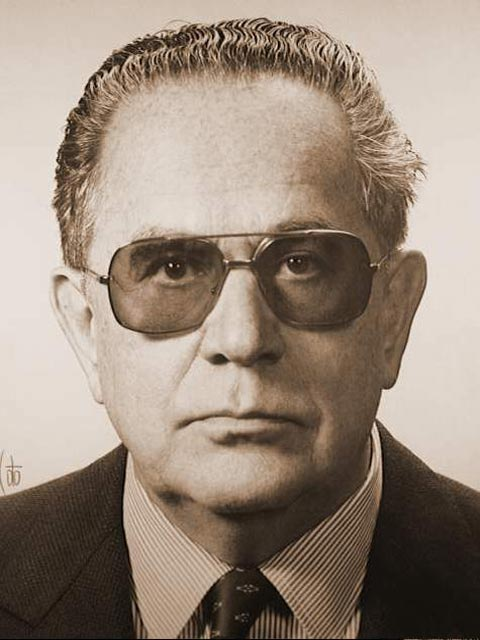
- Tattenbach in 1981

Ambassador of Costa Rica to the United States
- In office 8 May 1990 – 8 May 1994
- President: Rafael Ángel Calderón Fournier
- Preceded by: Guido Fernández Saborío
- Succeeded by: Sonia Picado Sotela
Other positions
23rd President of the Legislative Assembly of Costa Rica
In office 1 May 1981 – 30 April 1982
Preceded by	Rafael Grillo Rivera
Succeeded by	Hernán Garrón Salazar
Deputy of the Legislative Assembly of Costa Rica
In office 1 May 1986 – 30 April 1990
Preceded by	Julio Jurado del Barco
Succeeded by	Óscar Soley Soler
Constituency	San José (12th Office)
In office 1 May 1978 – 30 April 1982
Preceded by	Stanley Muñoz Sánchez
Succeeded by	Jorge Luis Villanueva Badilla
Constituency	San José (5th Office)
In office 1 May 1962 – 30 April 1966
Preceded by	Office established
Succeeded by	Frank Marshall Jiménez
Constituency	San José (19th Office)
Minister of Justice and Grace
In office 8 May 1966 – 8 May 1970
President	José Joaquín Trejos Fernández
Preceded by	Francisco Urbina González
Succeeded by	Carlos Vicente Castro

Personal details
- Born: Cristian Franz von Tattenbach Iglesias; 10 January 1924 San José, Costa Rica
- Died: 8 May 2007 (aged 83) San José, Costa Rica
- Party: PUSC (from 1983)
- Other political affiliations: Unity Coalition (1976–1983); UN (1966–1976); PUN (before 1966)
- Education: University of Costa Rica (LLB)

Cristian Franz von Tattenbach Iglesias (10 January 1924 – 8 May 2007) was a Costa Rican lawyer and politician who served as the 23rd President of the Legislative Assembly from 1981 to 1982. A founding member of the Social Christian Unity Party, he had previously served as Minister of Justice and Grace from 1966 to 1970.

== Biography ==
Tattenbach was born in San José on 10 January 1924, the son of Graf Franz Ludwig von Tattenbach von Metzler and Luisa Josefa Iglesias Rodríguez. He studied law at the University of Costa Rica, where he obtained a law degree and qualified as a notary public.

Tattenbach was first elected to the Legislative Assembly under the National Union Party for the 1962–1966 legislative term. He subsequently served as Minister of Interior, Police, Justice and Grace during the administration of President José Joaquín Trejos Fernández.

In 1975, Tattenbach was among the founders of the Autonomous University of Central America (UACA), the first private university established in Costa Rica.

In 1978, he was again elected to the Legislative Assembly for the 1978–1982 legislative term, as a member of the Unity Coalition. During that period he chaired the Committee on Government and Administration. On 1 May 1981, Tattenbach was elected president of the Legislative Assembly for the 1981–1982 legislative year.

Tattenbach was re-elected to the legislature in 1986. He later served as Costa Rica's ambassador to the United States during the administration of President Rafael Ángel Calderón Fournier between 1990 and 1994.

== Later life and death ==
He died in San José on 8 May 2007 at the age of 83.
