= Leda Zamora Chaves =

Costa Rican civil servant and politician

Deputy Legislative Assembly of Costa Rica
- In office 2006–2010
- Constituency: San José

Personal details
- Born: Upala, Costa Rica
- Party: Citizens' Action Party
- Profession: Civil servant and political activist

Leda Zamora Chaves is a Costa Rican civil servant and politician. She was Treasurer of the Citizens' Action Party (PAC for its Spanish initials) between 2006 and 2014.

== Academics and early career ==
Zamora was raised in Bijagua de Upala. Zamora graduated with a licentiate in public administration from the University of Costa Rica in 1993. In addition, she is studying for a Master's in social project administration.

Beginning in 1992, Zamora worked for the Costa Rican Institute for Electricity (ICE for its Spanish initials). She worked in finance, import payment and accounting, and electric production until resigning in 2006 to join the PAC.

Zamora's interest in politics began when the PAC was formed. She claimed that she shared the values and missions of the party from its inception.

Between 1997 and 1999, she served on the Executive Board of the Economic Sciences Professional Union.

== Political career ==
In 2006, Zamora ran for and won the third deputy seat for San José. She represented the area of Coronado de San José. Among her interests were the problems with youth, including drug culture, prostitution, and educational opportunities.

Later, she worked directly for the PAC as an on various commissions between 2010 and 2014.

== Personal life ==
Zamora enjoys swimming and mountain biking. She has one son.
