= Francisco Antonio Pacheco Fernández =

Costa Rican academic and politician (born 1940)

Francisco Antonio Pacheco
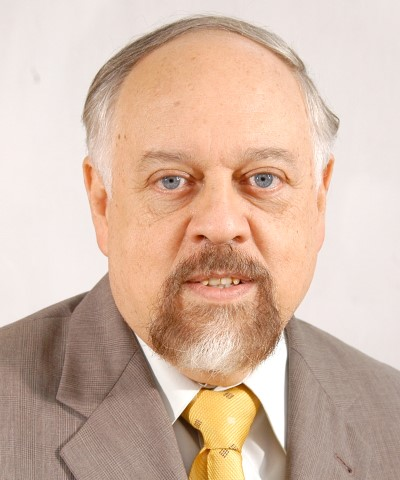
- Official portrait, 2006

47th President of the Legislative Assembly of Costa Rica
- In office 1 May 2006 – 30 April 2010
- Preceded by: Gerardo González Esquivel
- Succeeded by: Luis Gerardo Villanueva Monge

Deputy of the Legislative Assembly of Costa Rica
- In office 1 May 2006 – 30 April 2010
- Preceded by: Edgar Mohs Villalta
- Succeeded by: Guillermo Zúñiga Chaves
- Constituency: San José (1st Office)
- In office 1 May 1994 – 30 April 1998
- Preceded by: Víctor Morales Mora
- Succeeded by: Rina Contreras López
- Constituency: San José (3rd Office)

President of the National Liberation Party
- In office 5 July 2003 – 15 May 2010
- Preceded by: Marielos Sancho Barquero
- Succeeded by: Bernal Jiménez Monge

Minister of Public Education
- In office 8 May 1986 – 8 May 1990
- President: Óscar Arias
- Preceded by: Eugenio Rodríguez Vega
- Succeeded by: Marvin Herrera Araya

Ambassador of Costa Rica to Italy
- In office 12 May 1982 – 21 June 1985
- President: Luis Alberto Monge
- Preceded by: Carlos Joaquín Zúñiga Odio
- Succeeded by: Humberto Nigro Borbón

Rector of the Distance State University
- In office 9 April 1977 – 2 September 1981
- Preceded by: Position established
- Succeeded by: Chester Zelaya Goodman

Personal details
- Born: Francisco Antonio Pacheco Fernández; 2 April 1940 (age 86) Alajuela, Costa Rica
- Party: PLN
- Education: University of Costa Rica (BA, LLB); University of Strasbourg (PhD)
- Occupation: Philosopher; lawyer; politician; professor; writer

Francisco Antonio Pacheco Fernández (born 19 April 1959) is a Costa Rican philosopher, lawyer and statesman who served as the 47th President of the Legislative Assembly from 2006 to 2010. A member of the National Liberation Party, he was the first during the Second Republic to hold the office for an entire constitutional term.

== Biography ==
Pacheco was born in Alajuela, Costa Rica, to Antonio Pacheco Pérez and Celina Fernández Solórzano. He studied at the University of Costa Rica, where he obtained degrees in philosophy and law. He subsequently earned a doctorate in philosophy from the University of Strasbourg in France.

Pacheco was a member of the academic staff of the University of Costa Rica, where he taught in the fields of philosophy, political science, and law. His teaching included Theory of the State in the Faculty of Law, Political Philosophy in the Faculty of Arts and the School of Political Science, and Foundations of Philosophy in the General Studies program. He also served as director of the Department of General Studies from 1971 to 1973. In 1979, he attained the rank of catedrático (full professor), the highest academic rank in the university's career system.

In 1977, Pacheco was appointed the first rector of the Distance State University (UNED). He served from April 1977 to September 1981, and participated in the establishment of the university's initial administrative and academic structures. Following his tenure at UNED, Pacheco was appointed Ambassador of Costa Rica to Italy in May 1982 and served in Rome from 1982 to June 1985.

Pacheco was appointed Minister of Public Education during the first administration of Óscar Arias Sánchez, serving from 1986 to 1990. He was elected to the Legislative Assembly in the 1994 general election, serving from 1994 to 1998. He was later elected as President of the National Liberation Party in July 2003, and remained in the office until his resignation in May 2010.

Pacheco returned to the Assembly following the 2006 election, serving from 2006 to 2010. On 1 May 2006, he was elected president of the Legislative Assembly for the 2006–2007 legislative year and was subsequently re-elected to the position three consecutive times.

During the second administration of Óscar Arias, Pacheco also served as acting president of Costa Rica on various ocassions, the first being when Arias traveled to El Salvador to attend a Presidential Summit on 30 October 2008. At the time, both vice presidents, Kevin Casas Zamora and Laura Chinchilla, had resigned from their respective positions.
