= María Eugenia Venegas =

Costa Rican educator, politician (born 1952)

Deputy Legislative Assembly of Costa Rica
- In office 2010–2014
- Constituency: San José

Personal details
- Born: 23 October 1952 (age 73) Escazú, Costa Rica
- Party: Citizens' Action Party
- Children: 2
- Profession: Educator, politician

María Eugenia Venegas Renauld (born 23 October 1952) is a Costa Rican educator, who has served as dean of the Faculty of Education of the University of Costa Rica and as a deputy of the Legislative Assembly of Costa Rica, representing the Citizens' Action Party in the 8th position in the province of San José. She is the daughter of Rudy Venegas Moreno and Ángela Eugenia Renauld Campos, she has two children, María Antonia and Esteban Solís Venegas.

== Education ==
Venegas holds a doctorate in education with an honors degree from the University of Costa Rica. Her doctoral thesis is called "The concept of" formation "in the Fundamental Law of Education of Costa Rica and its roots in the pedagogical thought of the West." She is also a Magister Scientiae in education with an emphasis in Research, a Bachelor of Chemistry Teaching and a Bachelor of Education from the University of Costa Rica.

== Teaching ==
As a teacher, Venegas has served as a professor at the University of Costa Rica, Dean of the Faculty of Education (December 2005 to November 2009) and director of the university teaching department (September 2000 to August 2002; March 2004 to November 2005) at the university from Costa Rica.

== Political career ==
On 17 March 2010, the Supreme Electoral Tribunal of Costa Rica formally announced the list of deputies that would make up the Legislative Assembly for the 2010-2014 period, conferring on María Eugenia Venegas the 8th place for the province of San José.
