= Luis Fishman Zonzinski =

Costa Rican politician (born 1947)

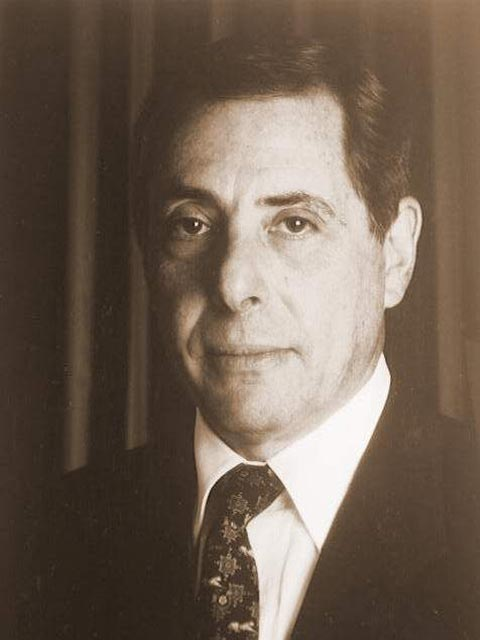

Deputy of the Legislative Assembly of Costa Rica
- In office 1 May 2010 – 30 April 2014
- Preceded by: Guyón Holt Massey Mora
- Succeeded by: Óscar López Arias
- Constituency: San José (17th Office)
- In office 1 May 1998 – 30 April 2002
- Preceded by: Antonio Álvarez Desanti
- Succeeded by: Aída Faingezicht Waisleder
- Constituency: San José (2nd Office)
- In office 1 May 1986 – 30 April 1990
- Preceded by: Juan José Trejos Fonseca
- Succeeded by: Hugo Alfonso Muñoz Quesada
- Constituency: San José (15th Office)

President of the Social Christian Unity Party
- In office 1 July 2006 – 4 July 2010
- Preceded by: Lorena Vásquez Badilla
- Succeeded by: Gerardo Vargas Rojas

40th President of the Legislative Assembly of Costa Rica
- In office 1 May 1998 – 30 April 1999
- Preceded by: Saúl Weisleder Weisleder
- Succeeded by: Carlos Vargas Pagán

Minister of Public Security
- In office 16 August 1991 – 8 May 1994
- President: Rafael Ángel Calderón Fournier
- Preceded by: Víctor Herrera Alfaro
- Succeeded by: Juan Diego Castro Fernández

Personal details
- Born: Luis Fishman Zonzinski; 30 December 1947 (age 78) San José, Costa Rica
- Party: PUSC
- Spouse: Aida Faingezicht Waisleder (m. 1970)
- Children: 3
- Education: University of Costa Rica (LLB)

Luis Fishman Zonzinski (born 30 December 1947) is a Costa Rican lawyer and retired politician who served as a Deputy to the Legislative Assembly from 2010 to 2014. A member of the Social Christian Unity Party, he previously held a seat from 1986 to 1990 and from 1998 to 2002. Fishman chaired the party from 2006 to 2010.

He was the President of the Legislative Assembly of Costa Rica from 1998 to 1999. Fishman Zonzinski was elected as the Second Vice President of Costa Rica alongside Lineth Saborío Chaverri from 2002–2006, but never formally took office. In 2010, he was the Social Christian Unity Party's candidate for president in the general election. Fishman was Minister of Public Security and Minister of Interior and Police during Rafael Angel Calderon’s government.
