= Rina Contreras López =

Costa Rican economist and politician (born 1950)

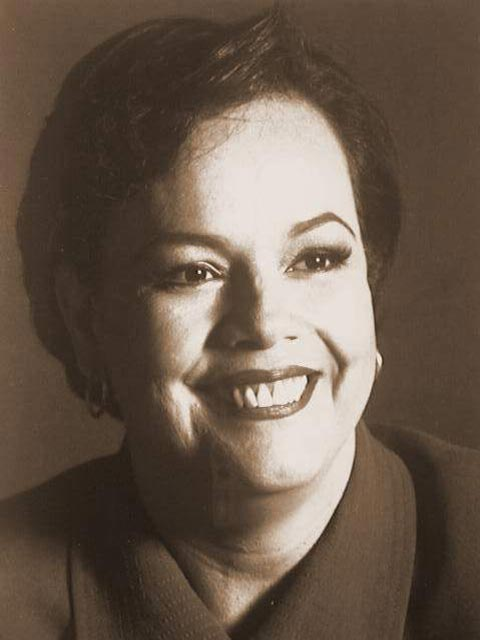
- Contreras in 2000

Minister of the Presidency of Costa Rica
- In office 8 May 2002 – 27 May 2003
- President: Abel Pacheco
- Preceded by: Danilo Chaverri Soto
- Succeeded by: Ricardo Toledo Carranza

42nd President of the Legislative Assembly of Costa Rica
- In office 1 May 2000 – 30 April 2001
- Preceded by: Carlos Vargas Pagán
- Succeeded by: Ovidio Pacheco Salazar

Deputy of the Legislative Assembly of Costa Rica
- In office 1 May 1998 – 30 April 2002
- Preceded by: Francisco Antonio Pacheco Fernández
- Succeeded by: Rolando Laclé Castro
- Constituency: San José (3rd Office)

Personal details
- Born: Rina María Contreras López; 10 February 1950 (age 76) San José, Costa Rica
- Party: PUSC
- Spouse: Guillermo Madriz de Mezerville (div.)
- Children: 4

Rina María Contreras López (born 10 February 1950) is a Costa Rican politician who was the President of the Legislative Assembly of Costa Rica from 2000 to 2001, and as the minister of the Presidency from 2002 to 2003, during the administration of Abel Pacheco.

A member of the Social Christian Unity Party, Contreras served as a deputy before the Legislative Assembly for the province of San José between 1998 and 2002, as well as she held the presidency of the Executive Committee of her party between 2001 and 2002.

== Early years and education ==
Contreras was born in San José, on 10 February 1950, the daughter of Fernando Contreras and María López, a merchant. Her family moved to Honduras after her birth. She attended the Escuela Sagrado Corazón de Jesús, in that country, and later Colegio Monterrey, located in the city of San Pedro. Her mother would marry a new person for the third time, this time to Francisco Calderón Guardia, a Costa Rican politician and brother of then-Republican President Rafael Ángel Calderón Guardia. Contreras enrolled at Lincoln College and the Instituto Parauniversitario American Business Academy, where she would obtain the title of technician in bilingual secretariat.

At the age of 16, she began a courtship with Guillermo Madriz de Mezerville, who would later enter a political career and with whom she married in 1968. Along with him, Contreras conceived four children.
