= Carolina Delgado Ramírez =

Costa Rican politician (born 1970)

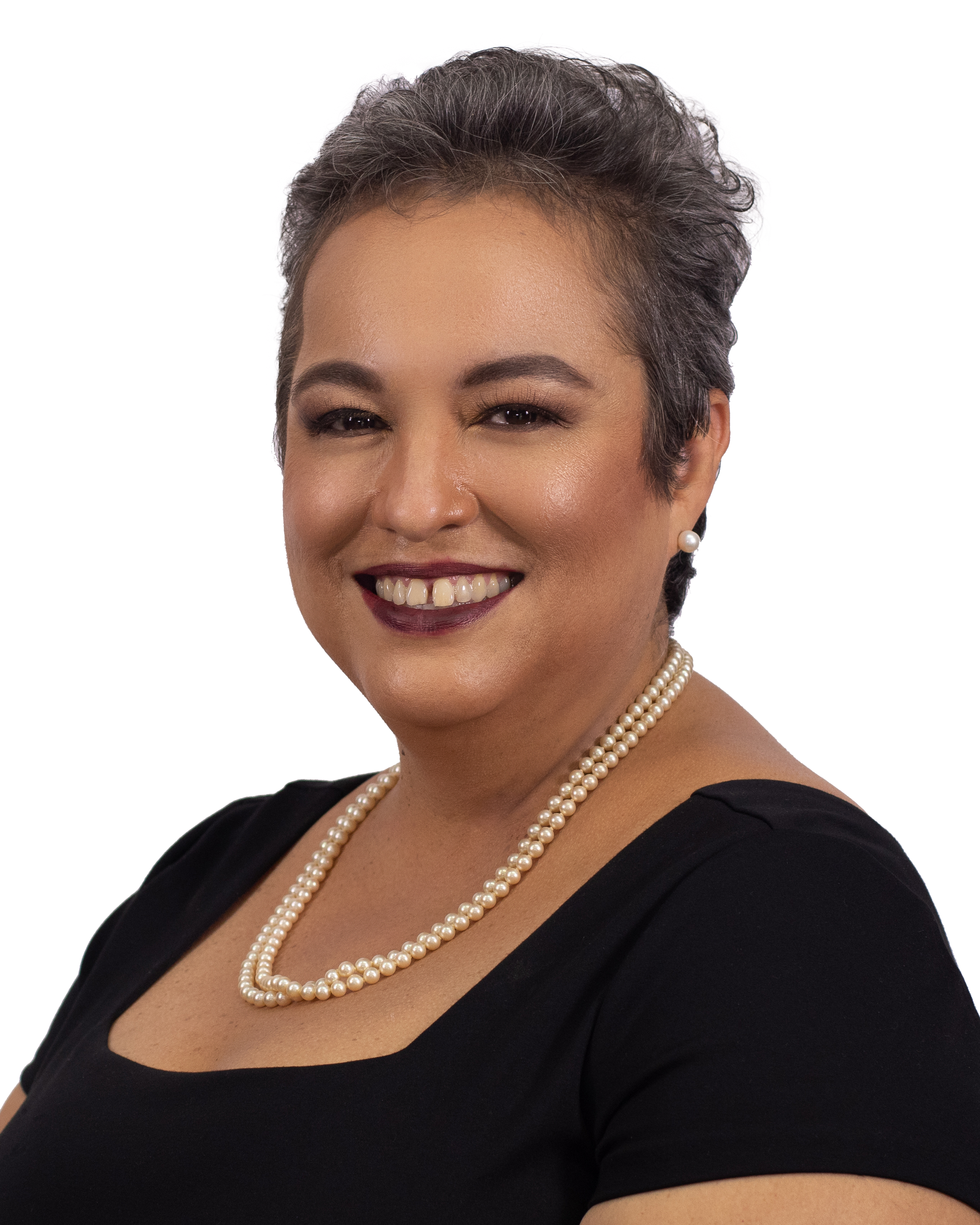
- Official portrait, 2022

Deputy of the Legislative Assembly of Costa Rica
- Constituency: San José

Personal details
- Born: Carolina Delgado Ramírez; December 12, 1970 (age 55)
- Party: National Liberation Party
- Spouse: Divorced
- Children: María Isabel
- Education: Bachelor of Architecture
- Profession: Architect

Carolina Delgado Ramírez (born 12 December 1970) is a Costa Rican politician serving in the Legislative Assembly of Costa Rica.

== Biography ==
Delgado Ramírez was born to Gonzalo Delgado Estrada and Florisabel Ramírez Lizano. She went to primary school in Escuela Nueva Laboratorio graduating in 1983 and High school in Colegio Calasanz graduating in 1988. She graduated from the Central University of Costa Rica in 2010 with a Bachelor of Architecture. She played Volleyball for a team called Zepol and was national champion in 1987 and 1988. From 2006 to 2010, she was an advisor to the Minister of Tourism and the Minister of Agriculture. She was a member of the Legislative Assembly of Costa Rica from 2009 to 2010, 2013–2015, and 2022–2026.
