= Fabricio Alvarado Muñoz =

Costa Rican singer and politician (born 1974)

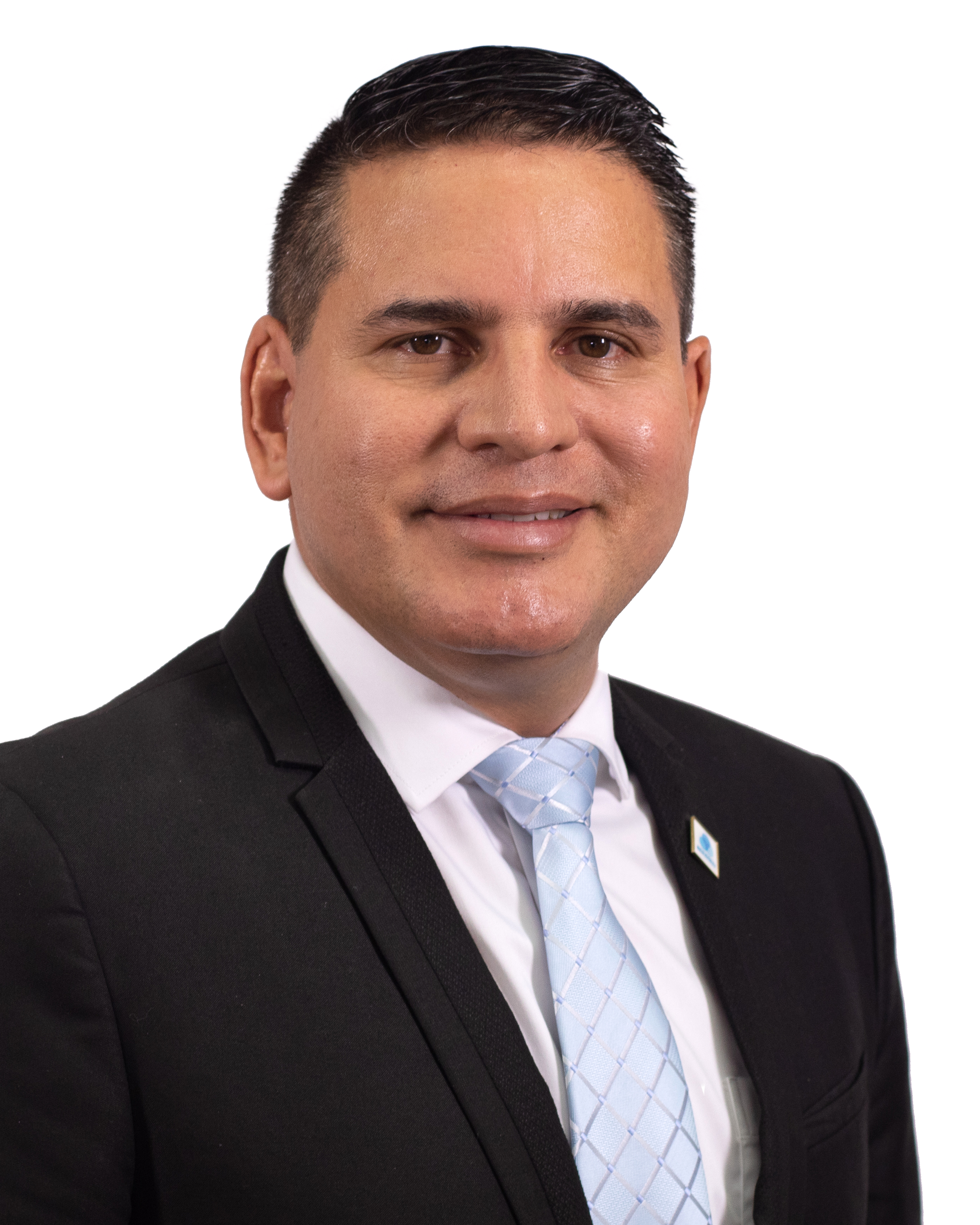
- Official portrait, 2022

President of the New Republic Party
- Incumbent
- Assumed office 24 May 2023
- Preceded by: Juan Diego López Quirós

Deputy of the Legislative Assembly of Costa Rica
- In office 1 May 2022 – 30 April 2026
- Preceded by: Walter Muñoz Céspedes
- Succeeded by: Antonio Trejos Mazariegos
- Constituency: San José (16th Office)
- In office 1 May 2014 – 1 January 2017
- Preceded by: José María Villalta Flórez-Estrada
- Succeeded by: Alexandra Loría Beeche
- Constituency: San José (18th Office)

General Secretary of the New Republic Party
- In office 30 January 2019 – 24 May 2023
- Preceded by: Party established
- Succeeded by: Mónica Catalán Marín

Personal details
- Born: Gerardo Fabricio Alvarado Muñoz; 30 May 1974 (age 52) San José, Costa Rica
- Party: New Republic Party (since 2019)
- Other political affiliations: National Restoration Party (2005–2018)
- Website: Campaign website

Gerardo Fabricio Alvarado Muñoz (born 30 May 1974) is a Costa Rican politician, singer and undergraduate journalist who served as a Deputy in the Legislative Assembly of Costa Rica representing the San José Province for the National Restoration Party from 2014 to 2017. He then founded his own party, the New Republic Party, in 2019 and became a deputy of the legislative assembly again in 2022.

== Early life ==
Alvarado was born on 30 May 1974 in San José, Costa Rica. He is the son of Gerardo Alvarado Garita and Dulce María Muñoz Gamboa. His father, Gerardo, was a singer of the Taboga Band, and he is also the cousin of Luis Alonso Naranjo, who is a vocalist for the band ESCATS. He did his secondary studies at the Liceo de San Miguel in Desamparados before studying collective communication sciences at the University of Costa Rica, but eventually dropped out. He then worked as a journalist on Channel 4 and later Repretel, reporting on the news programs NC4 and Hechos. During this time, he also began to do music, recording Christian music albums. In 2009, he moved to the La Uruca channel and worked as a news anchor on Mundo Cristiano and was on a radio program called Metamorfosis.

== Political career ==
He was once a deputy in the Legislative Assembly, representing the San José Province. He is also a musician, having released a number of songs in the Christian genre. A member of the conservative National Restoration Party (and its only lawmaker for the 2014–2018 period) he was also the party's presidential nominee for the 2018 general election, ultimately losing to Carlos Alvarado Quesada. His campaign gained popularity because of his opposition to an Inter-American Court of Human Rights ruling that required legal recognition of same-sex marriage.

On 23 October 2018 Alvarado announced his resignation to National Restoration Party and the start of a new party named New Republic. His campaign is under investigation by the Ministerio Público after the Tribunal Supremo de Elecciones reported that it had found three providers of services on the elections that had been paid by cash, something that is illegal in Costa Rica.

Alvarado signed the Madrid Charter, a document drafted by the far-right Spanish party Vox that describes left-wing groups as enemies of Ibero-America involved in a "criminal project" that are "under the umbrella of the Cuban regime".

Fabricio Alvarado pledged not to raise taxes if elected president.

== Electoral performance ==
=== Presidential ===
Election	Candidate	First round				Second round			
Election	Candidate	Votes	%	Position	Result	Votes	%	Position	Result
2018		505,214	24.91%	▲1/	–	822,997	39.21%	2	Lost
2022		311,633	14.88%	▼3/	Lost				

== Personal life ==
Alvarado Muñoz is a devout Evangelical Christian.

== See also ==
- Evangelical political parties in Latin America
