= San José (Legislative Assembly constituency) =

Constituency in Costa Rica

- Constituency for the Legislative Assembly of Costa Rica
- Location of San José within Costa Rica
- Province: San José
- Population: 1,601,167 (2022)
- Electorate: 1,157,828 (2022)
- Area: 4,970 km^{2} (2024)

Current Constituency
- Created: 1949
- Seats: List: 19 (2014–present); 20 (2002–2014); 21 (1966–2002); 20 (1962–1966); 16 (1953–1962); 13 (1949–1953)
- Deputies: List: Rocío Alfaro Molina (FA); Waldo Agüero Sanabria (PPSD); Luz Mary Alpízar Loaiza (PPSD); Fabricio Alvarado Muñoz (PNR); Andrea Álvarez Marín (PLN); Rodrigo Arias Sánchez (PLN); Kattia Cambronero Aguiluz (PLP); Vanessa Castro Mora (PUSC); Pilar Cisneros (PPSD); Cynthia Córdoba Serrano (Ind); Carolina Delgado Ramírez (PLN); Eli Feinzaig (PLP); Carlos Felipe García Molina (PUSC); Sofía Guillén Pérez (FA); Gilbert Jiménez Siles (Ind); Manuel Morales Díaz (PPSD); Gloria Navas Montero (Ind); Ariel Robles (FA); Danny Vargas Serrano (PLN)

San José is one of the seven multi-member constituencies of the Legislative Assembly, the national legislature of Costa Rica. The constituency was established in 1949 when the Legislative Assembly was established by the modified constitution imposed by the Figueres dictatorship. It is conterminous with the province of San José. The constituency currently elects 19 of the 57 members of the Legislative Assembly using the closed party-list proportional representation electoral system. At the 2022 general election it had 1,157,828 registered electors.

== Electoral system ==
San José currently elects 19 of the 57 members of the Legislative Assembly using the closed party-list proportional representation electoral system. Seats are allocated using the largest remainder method using the Hare quota (cociente). Only parties that receive at least 50% of the Hare quota (subcociente) compete for remainder seats. Any seats remaining unfilled after allocation using the quotient system are distributed amongst parties that surpassed the subcociente, is descending order of their total votes in the constituency. The latter process is repeated until all the seats in the constituency are filled.

== Election results ==
=== Summary ===
Election	United People PU / IU / CC2000 / PASO			Broad Front FA			Citizens' Action PAC			National Republican PRN / PR / PRI / PC			National Liberation PLN / PSD			Social Christian Unity PUSC / CU / PDC			National Unification PUN / PUN			National Integration PIN			Libertarian Movement PML			Social Democratic Progress PPSD			National Restoration PRN		
Election	Votes	%	Seats	Votes	%	Seats	Votes	%	Seats	Votes	%	Seats	Votes	%	Seats	Votes	%	Seats	Votes	%	Seats	Votes	%	Seats	Votes	%	Seats	Votes	%	Seats	Votes	%	Seats
2022	1,932	0.27%	0	72,378	10.03%	3	13,223	1.83%	0				174,406	24.16%	5	67,609	9.37%	2				5,032	0.70%	0	4,652	0.64%	0	124,699	17.28%	4	10,335	1.43%	0
2018				37,289	4.97%	1	131,046	17.45%	4				134,886	17.96%	4	114,201	15.21%	3				51,804	6.90%	2	16,813	2.24%	0				132,062	17.59%	4
2014				88,326	12.07%	2	199,127	27.22%	5				171,856	23.49%	5	64,627	8.83%	2				4,570	0.62%	0	55,156	7.54%	2				38,874	5.31%	1
2010				32,247	4.67%	1	131,476	19.05%	4				244,763	35.46%	7	50,880	7.37%	2				8,537	1.24%	0	85,139	12.33%	2						
2006	2,037	0.33%	0	17,751	2.91%	1	159,050	26.12%	5				204,429	33.57%	7	37,834	6.21%	2				6,501	1.07%	0	56,035	9.20%	2				32,909	5.40%	1
2002	3,313	0.57%	0				156,564	26.97%	6				140,218	24.15%	5	157,139	27.07%	6				10,675	1.84%	0	68,385	11.78%	2						
1998	4,633	0.88%	0										191,411	36.21%	8	198,706	37.60%	8				24,787	4.69%	1	24,520	4.64%	1						
1994													253,863	44.21%	10	228,291	39.76%	9															
1990	23,767	4.50%	1										227,751	43.08%	9	234,763	44.41%	10															
1986	16,149	3.43%	1										233,335	49.55%	10	189,852	40.32%	9															
1982	28,320	7.22%	2										216,301	55.11%	12	111,874	28.50%	6															
1978	31,302	9.28%	2										124,561	36.95%	8	150,475	44.63%	10	7,220	2.14%	0												
1974	11,846	4.31%	1							15,253	5.56%	1	109,990	40.06%	9	4,606	1.68%	0	64,160	23.37%	5												
1970	17,119	7.88%	2										109,242	50.26%	11	7,705	3.54%	1	73,374	33.76%	7												
1966													83,130	49.38%	10				71,259	42.33%	9												
1962										53,352	34.38%	7	73,045	47.06%	9				20,151	12.98%	3												
1958										22,563	26.68%	4	31,453	37.19%	6				16,614	19.64%	3												
1953										12,696	17.35%	3	47,353	64.70%	10				4,796	6.55%	1												
1949												2			1						9												

=== Detailed ===
==== 2020s ====
===== 2022 =====
Results of the 2022 general election held on 6 February 2022:

Party		Votes per canton																				Total votes	%	Seats
Party		Acosta	Ala- juelita	Aserrí	Curri- dabat	Desam- parados	Dota	Escazú	Goicoe- chea	León Cortés Castro	Montes de Oca	Mora	Moravia	Pérez Zeledón	Puriscal	San José	Santa Ana	Tarrazú	Tibás	Turru- bares	Vázquez de Coro- nado	Total votes	%	Seats
National Liberation Party	PLN	3,135	5,790	7,730	8,059	28,622	1,013	7,978	12,047	1,935	6,403	3,772	6,811	15,393	6,058	33,403	6,772	1,789	8,197	1,085	8,414	174,406	24.16%	5
Social Democratic Progress Party	PPSD	1,390	4,905	4,179	5,436	17,157	504	5,425	9,826	516	4,528	3,126	5,715	14,178	3,727	25,245	4,172	921	6,733	398	6,618	124,699	17.28%	4
Progressive Liberal Party	PLP	385	2,625	2,043	6,171	9,879	178	8,303	6,731	203	4,771	1,812	4,944	2,044	908	18,425	6,017	350	4,692	102	4,789	85,372	11.83%	3
Broad Front	FA	809	2,476	3,014	3,640	9,971	345	2,649	6,616	542	5,063	1,269	3,644	6,115	1,414	14,302	1,692	775	3,489	107	4,446	72,378	10.03%	3
New Republic Party	PNR	467	4,386	2,398	2,518	11,832	156	1,710	6,271	273	1,459	1,076	2,369	7,426	878	15,471	1,412	292	3,461	145	3,669	67,669	9.37%	2
Social Christian Unity Party	PUSC	1,821	2,445	2,742	2,312	8,206	624	2,240	4,918	1,001	1,951	1,565	2,191	11,472	3,342	10,721	2,410	1,234	2,846	667	2,901	67,609	9.37%	2
Citizens' Action Party	PAC	1,673	357	592	595	1,259	96	447	1,209	99	792	254	571	1,063	325	2,073	429	116	598	54	621	13,223	1.83%	0
Accessibility without Exclusion	PASE	111	735	672	773	2,380	34	499	1,113	40	308	233	476	828	212	3,131	281	57	561	10	608	13,062	1.81%	0
Liberal Union Party	UL	75	460	344	719	1,395	41	855	997	41	565	197	617	743	139	2,502	592	69	615	19	625	11,610	1.61%	0
National Force Party	PFN	117	468	463	480	1,736	39	458	1,032	57	430	197	526	1,013	236	2,520	329	95	716	17	622	11,551	1.60%	0
National Restoration Party	PRN	85	620	419	406	1,705	32	266	863	68	245	193	460	998	202	2,259	237	102	605	22	548	10,335	1.43%	0
New Generation Party	PNG	56	1,930	249	168	749	359	285	604	468	200	181	250	530	74	1,061	121	1,351	260	7	322	9,225	1.28%	0
Social Christian Republican Party	PRSC	185	862	317	246	971	35	293	603	133	224	142	243	868	427	1,498	222	113	305	28	587	8,302	1.15%	0
United We Can	UP	72	355	502	351	929	18	357	732	27	312	125	382	304	102	1,820	239	31	394	15	462	7,529	1.04%	0
A Just Costa Rica	CRJ	56	236	200	263	795	33	251	555	24	325	122	292	835	158	1,448	207	30	343	36	287	6,496	0.90%	0
Let's Go		28	116	102	440	457	40	287	403	14	696	90	297	180	68	1,132	252	42	289	4	268	5,205	0.72%	0
National Integration Party	PIN	36	219	203	161	770	23	206	326	77	190	105	134	795	297	914	94	61	191	12	218	5,032	0.70%	0
Libertarian Movement	PML	35	232	157	185	608	38	265	340	21	156	72	172	261	63	1,285	186	52	262	12	250	4,652	0.64%	0
Costa Rican Social Justice Party	JSC	47	153	152	106	520	42	142	264	110	100	75	126	714	109	635	120	76	127	13	178	3,809	0.53%	0
Our People Party	PNP	19	235	158	449	667	10	153	165	8	123	33	96	239	27	564	65	23	409	2	93	3,538	0.49%	0
Costa Rican Social; Democratic Movement	PMSDC	33	107	103	131	352	24	130	263	30	102	81	122	432	114	581	112	55	147	14	219	3,152	0.44%	0
Christian Democratic Alliance	ADC	19	157	66	94	348	15	140	226	13	78	47	94	271	65	632	68	16	121	6	140	2,616	0.36%	0
Workers' Party	PT	30	93	78	96	389	5	81	147	12	139	33	83	138	46	458	65	26	85	7	103	2,114	0.29%	0
United People	PU	36	107	208	56	317	9	45	136	41	57	31	64	131	35	354	70	117	57	3	58	1,932	0.27%	0
Costa Rican Anti-Corruption Party	PACO	21	219	83	60	235	18	70	136	14	42	44	60	151	38	373	42	18	58	8	78	1,768	0.24%	0
Costa Rican Democratic Union	PUCD	57	46	63	44	389	9	25	108	12	55	27	38	156	25	250	21	19	42	6	62	1,454	0.20%	0
National Encounter Party	PEN	34	77	80	48	192	10	46	114	28	40	31	40	200	57	243	28	14	78	2	55	1,417	0.20%	0
United for Costa Rica Party	UCR	7	46	36	22	114	5	32	73	5	64	12	38	71	9	179	11	3	60	4	122	913	0.13%	0
New Socialist Party	NPS	18	53	31	25	93	7	21	55	13	20	21	18	147	17	126	19	18	34	5	37	778	0.11%	0
Valid votes		10,857	30,510	27,384	34,054	103,037	3,762	33,659	56,873	5,825	29,438	14,966	30,873	67,696	19,172	143,605	26,285	7,865	35,775	2,810	37,400	721,846	100.00%	19
Blank votes		127	162	249	129	601	61	124	272	151	87	132	98	1,111	326	627	100	138	130	47	148	4,820	0.66%	
Rejected votes – other		128	349	295	184	926	40	240	468	92	154	173	231	849	214	1,242	171	83	289	27	296	6,451	0.88%	
Total polled		11,112	31,021	27,928	34,367	104,564	3,863	34,023	57,613	6,068	29,679	15,271	31,202	69,656	19,712	145,474	26,556	8,086	36,194	2,884	37,844	733,117	63.32%	
Registered electors		17,749	53,246	44,906	51,538	166,029	5,851	50,442	92,061	9,531	43,082	23,192	45,628	117,494	29,937	237,728	39,066	12,707	56,539	4,974	56,128	1,157,828		
Turnout		62.61%	58.26%	62.19%	66.68%	62.98%	66.02%	67.45%	62.58%	63.67%	68.89%	65.85%	68.38%	59.28%	65.84%	61.19%	67.98%	63.63%	64.02%	57.98%	67.42%	63.32%		

The following candidates were elected: Rocío Alfaro Molina (FA); Waldo Agüero Sanabria (PPSD); Luz Mary Alpízar Loaiza (PPSD); Fabricio Alvarado Muñoz (PNR); Andrea Álvarez Marín (PLN); Rodrigo Arias Sánchez (PLN); Kattia Cambronero Aguiluz (PLP); Vanessa Castro Mora (PUSC); Pilar Cisneros (PPSD); Carolina Delgado Ramírez (PLN); Jorge Dengo Rosabal (PLP); Eli Feinzaig (PLP); Carlos Felipe García Molina (PUSC); Sofía Guillén Pérez (FA); Gilbert Jiménez Siles (PLN); Manuel Morales Díaz (PPSD); Gloria Navas Montero (PNR); Ariel Robles (FA); and Danny Vargas Serrano (PLN).

==== 2010s ====
===== 2018 =====
Results of the 2018 general election held on 4 February 2018:

Party		Votes per canton																				Total votes	%	Seats
Party		Acosta	Ala- juelita	Aserrí	Curri- dabat	Desam- parados	Dota	Escazú	Goicoe- chea	León Cortés Castro	Montes de Oca	Mora	Moravia	Pérez Zeledón	Puriscal	San José	Santa Ana	Tarrazú	Tibás	Turru- bares	Vázquez de Coro- nado	Total votes	%	Seats
National Liberation Party	PLN	2,520	3,907	6,541	6,496	20,012	830	7,091	9,542	1,411	5,090	2,552	5,175	10,989	4,481	27,149	5,610	1,440	6,759	1,185	6,106	134,886	17.96%	4
National Restoration Party	PRN	964	8,140	4,600	5,117	22,666	264	3,877	12,588	450	3,203	2,125	5,051	13,101	1,619	30,015	2,867	618	6,810	207	7,780	132,062	17.59%	4
Citizens' Action Party	PAC	2,446	4,179	5,162	6,605	18,157	907	5,374	11,527	1,087	7,640	2,793	6,839	7,939	3,456	25,257	4,266	1,530	7,552	277	8,053	131,046	17.45%	4
Social Christian Unity Party	PUSC	1,523	2,807	3,375	6,101	12,141	492	6,610	7,760	1,205	5,090	2,280	5,018	19,582	2,493	20,511	4,942	1,676	5,719	546	4,330	114,201	15.21%	3
National Integration Party	PIN	951	2,770	1,968	2,064	7,723	176	2,121	4,462	245	1,800	927	2,162	3,510	1,176	12,327	1,590	302	2,846	139	2,545	51,804	6.90%	2
Broad Front	FA	400	1,324	1,398	1,770	4,930	226	1,372	3,387	274	2,509	477	1,828	3,961	547	7,978	804	437	1,674	52	1,941	37,289	4.97%	1
Social Christian Republican Party	PRSC	493	1,625	1,423	1,097	5,139	193	1,085	2,382	321	741	498	913	2,732	1,353	5,953	793	671	1,285	118	1,900	30,715	4.09%	1
Libertarian Movement	PML	89	691	593	1,006	2,136	46	1,321	1,415	88	734	267	777	950	221	3,708	855	100	907	60	849	16,813	2.24%	0
New Generation Party	PNG	105	1,962	406	719	1,651	67	666	1,075	66	786	400	667	1,176	310	3,072	511	125	738	27	650	15,179	2.02%	0
Accessibility without Exclusion	PASE	194	903	655	682	2,661	58	550	1,205	91	353	234	543	848	317	3,368	389	98	687	37	638	14,511	1.93%	0
Christian Democratic Alliance	ADC	87	642	417	495	1,797	27	304	1,151	43	420	206	855	753	137	3,193	294	73	811	27	774	12,506	1.67%	0
Costa Rican Renewal Party	PRC	463	927	361	377	2,562	45	393	1,281	59	258	165	337	942	331	1,897	216	179	707	28	385	11,913	1.59%	0
Let's Go		61	185	196	564	946	28	424	717	54	918	136	505	270	101	1,934	293	44	462	5	440	8,283	1.10%	0
United Forces for Change Party	FUC	81	581	325	280	1,342	26	252	698	45	157	169	300	1,002	137	1,803	207	70	358	26	378	8,237	1.10%	0
Everybody		61	181	244	412	850	100	440	635	64	446	129	439	687	209	1,921	391	119	398	21	315	8,062	1.07%	0
United Communal Party	PCU	95	246	120	40	762	13	49	183	34	45	763	41	988	2,019	432	163	60	81	68	68	6,270	0.83%	0
Progressive Liberal Party	PLP	46	138	107	464	416	27	830	323	59	368	106	296	239	84	1,307	560	39	240	13	219	5,881	0.78%	0
Transporters' Party	PdT	62	148	125	147	759	26	81	385	87	153	91	133	788	119	819	78	152	175	5	535	4,868	0.65%	0
Workers' Party	PT	46	181	151	147	619	20	127	311	40	157	74	127	262	114	762	120	50	204	12	189	3,713	0.49%	0
Homeland, Equality and Democracy Party	PID	63	61	82	67	261	14	75	179	11	72	22	86	111	33	495	48	10	88	3	100	1,881	0.25%	0
New Socialist Party	NPS	12	33	27	20	101	13	37	72	10	38	20	28	117	24	143	25	12	27	7	24	790	0.11%	0
Valid votes		10,762	31,631	28,276	34,670	107,631	3,598	33,079	61,278	5,744	30,978	14,434	32,120	70,947	19,281	154,044	25,022	7,805	38,528	2,863	38,219	750,910	100.00%	19
Blank votes		98	150	194	83	469	51	120	204	117	68	96	82	759	265	544	84	95	116	36	113	3,744	0.49%	
Rejected votes – other		123	430	327	281	1,198	39	278	629	53	188	192	233	906	264	1,514	211	78	365	24	361	7,694	1.01%	
Total polled		10,983	32,211	28,797	35,034	109,298	3,688	33,477	62,111	5,914	31,234	14,722	32,435	72,612	19,810	156,102	25,317	7,978	39,009	2,923	38,693	762,348	68.39%	
Registered electors		16,608	50,373	42,853	48,859	160,243	5,566	46,971	90,058	9,210	42,391	21,361	44,209	111,779	28,424	234,558	35,074	12,188	55,965	4,593	53,496	1,114,779		
Turnout		66.13%	63.94%	67.20%	71.70%	68.21%	66.26%	71.27%	68.97%	64.21%	73.68%	68.92%	73.37%	64.96%	69.69%	66.55%	72.18%	65.46%	69.70%	63.64%	72.33%	68.39%		

The following candidates were elected: Ivonne Acuña Cabrera (PRN); Carlos Avendaño Calvo (PRN); Carlos Ricardo Benavides Jiménez (PLN); Shirley Díaz Mejías (PUSC); Silvia Hernández Sánchez (PLN); Harllan Hoepelman Páez (PRN); Wagner Jiménez Zúñiga (PLN); Víctor Morales Mora (PAC); Pedro Muñoz (PUSC); Walter Muñoz Céspedes (PIN); Ana Karine Niño Gutiérrez (PLN); Nielsen Pérez Pérez (PAC); Enrique Sánchez Carballo (PAC); Floria María Segreda Sagot (PRN); Otto Roberto Vargas Víquez (PRSC); Paola Vega Rodríguez (PAC); José María Villalta Flórez-Estrada (FA); María Vita Monge (PUSC); and Zoila Rosa Volio Pacheco (PIN).

===== 2014 =====
Results of the 2014 general election held on 2 February 2014:

Party		Votes per canton																				Total votes	%	Seats
Party		Acosta	Ala- juelita	Aserrí	Curri- dabat	Desam- parados	Dota	Escazú	Goicoe- chea	León Cortés Castro	Montes de Oca	Mora	Moravia	Pérez Zeledón	Puriscal	San José	Santa Ana	Tarrazú	Tibás	Turru- bares	Vázquez de Coro- nado	Total votes	%	Seats
Citizens' Action Party	PAC	2,013	6,304	6,625	10,861	27,318	1,195	8,018	18,889	819	11,223	3,298	11,011	13,592	4,555	40,719	6,222	1,460	12,371	527	12,107	199,127	27.22%	5
National Liberation Party	PLN	3,985	5,569	7,620	7,066	25,329	1,001	8,092	11,823	1,859	6,023	3,203	6,070	17,876	6,234	35,698	5,768	1,860	8,352	1,441	6,987	171,856	23.49%	5
Broad Front	FA	1,394	3,986	3,636	3,445	13,780	379	3,062	8,225	678	4,383	1,428	3,749	5,720	2,043	19,988	2,074	855	4,584	245	4,672	88,326	12.07%	2
Social Christian Unity Party	PUSC	1,509	2,340	2,466	1,809	7,199	321	1,651	3,790	1,036	1,383	2,217	1,693	17,534	2,076	9,776	1,732	1,419	2,332	291	2,053	64,627	8.83%	2
Libertarian Movement	PML	330	2,719	1,581	3,704	6,638	103	4,808	4,472	197	2,422	1,004	2,593	2,083	873	12,552	3,088	283	3,066	187	2,453	55,156	7.54%	2
National Restoration Party	PRN	221	2,089	1,005	1,596	6,178	69	978	4,140	131	1,208	541	1,909	3,605	583	9,020	912	144	2,329	35	2,181	38,874	5.31%	1
Accessibility without Exclusion	PASE	356	2,066	1,607	1,484	5,313	102	1,372	2,494	208	659	550	986	1,494	641	7,591	667	259	1,515	67	1,556	30,987	4.24%	1
Costa Rican Renewal Party	PRC	164	1,980	863	1,159	5,176	50	1,023	2,568	79	702	465	932	1,868	517	7,403	683	127	1,549	29	1,307	28,644	3.92%	1
New Homeland Party	PPN	127	538	526	591	2,083	61	635	1,366	76	684	206	691	778	258	3,837	367	86	1,115	49	716	14,790	2.02%	0
New Generation Party	PNG	59	345	339	918	1,522	29	959	1,334	30	1,052	216	800	431	194	3,148	423	54	888	12	751	13,504	1.85%	0
National Advance	PAN	110	899	254	297	1,033	20	237	546	35	385	106	246	207	121	1,948	148	86	424	17	481	7,600	1.04%	0
Transporters' Party	T	136	161	162	114	464	107	89	292	424	186	59	89	1,603	104	622	56	527	150	4	290	5,639	0.77%	0
National Integration Party	PIN	28	973	186	149	862	9	94	400	12	206	40	159	121	46	855	59	21	160	5	185	4,570	0.62%	0
Workers' Party	PT	66	214	167	139	640	32	149	343	50	178	79	163	339	97	991	92	79	181	11	231	4,241	0.58%	0
Patriotic Alliance	AP	35	78	73	96	733	19	64	125	69	118	21	90	209	49	548	33	22	120	10	80	2,592	0.35%	0
Homeland, Equality and Democracy Party	PID	19	45	22	36	132	5	30	177	6	31	9	53	67	22	283	16	8	60	3	64	1,088	0.15%	0
Valid votes		10,552	30,306	27,132	33,464	104,400	3,502	31,261	60,984	5,709	30,843	13,442	31,234	67,527	18,413	154,979	22,340	7,290	39,196	2,933	36,114	731,621	100.00%	19
Blank votes		105	130	192	96	480	39	89	232	95	82	118	82	572	212	561	85	87	117	33	103	3,510	0.47%	
Rejected votes – other		181	568	532	419	1,659	35	351	790	90	281	260	306	1,136	282	2,203	306	119	487	39	475	10,519	1.41%	
Total polled		10,838	31,004	27,856	33,979	106,539	3,576	31,701	62,006	5,894	31,206	13,820	31,622	69,235	18,907	157,743	22,731	7,496	39,800	3,005	36,692	745,650	70.14%	
Registered electors		15,551	47,597	40,321	46,270	152,242	5,193	43,354	87,701	8,733	41,489	19,190	42,357	105,670	26,459	228,847	31,041	11,458	55,540	4,375	49,673	1,063,061		
Turnout		69.69%	65.14%	69.09%	73.44%	69.98%	68.86%	73.12%	70.70%	67.49%	75.22%	72.02%	74.66%	65.52%	71.46%	68.93%	73.23%	65.42%	71.66%	68.69%	73.87%	70.14%		

The following candidates were elected: Fabricio Alvarado Muñoz (PRN); Antonio Álvarez Desanti (PLN); Carlos Arguedas Ramírez (PLN); Jorge Arguedas Mora (FA); Marvin Atencio Delgado (PAC); Epsy Campbell Barr (PAC); Maureen Clarke (PLN); Natalia Díaz Quintana (PML); Marcela Guerrero Campos (PAC); Otto Guevara (PML); Juan Luis Jiménez Succar (PLN); Óscar López (PASE); Patricia Mora Castellanos (FA); Víctor Hugo Morales Zapata (PAC); Sandra Piszk Feinzilber (PLN); Gonzalo Ramírez Zamora (PRC); Rosibel Ramos Madrigal (PUSC); Ottón Solís (PAC); and Humberto Vargas Corrales (PUSC).

===== 2010 =====
Results of the 2010 general election held on 7 February 2010:

Party		Votes per canton																				Total votes	%	Seats
Party		Acosta	Ala- juelita	Aserrí	Curri- dabat	Desam- parados	Dota	Escazú	Goicoe- chea	León Cortés Castro	Montes de Oca	Mora	Moravia	Pérez Zeledón	Puriscal	San José	Santa Ana	Tarrazú	Tibás	Turru- bares	Vázquez de Coro- nado	Total votes	%	Seats
National Liberation Party	PLN	3,893	8,620	8,448	11,651	33,280	1,197	11,910	18,080	2,575	10,524	4,564	10,011	23,899	7,479	52,480	7,736	2,757	13,615	1,355	10,689	244,763	35.46%	7
Citizens' Action Party	PAC	2,009	4,264	4,506	5,663	16,184	1,036	4,326	11,687	749	7,075	1,997	6,205	17,929	3,242	25,569	3,096	1,179	7,767	212	6,781	131,476	19.05%	4
Libertarian Movement	PML	1,096	4,342	3,171	3,957	12,758	262	4,925	7,468	507	3,028	1,725	3,348	4,462	2,065	19,109	2,868	752	5,165	204	3,927	85,139	12.33%	2
Accessibility without Exclusion	PASE	714	4,723	3,214	3,538	13,174	166	2,964	6,470	285	2,501	1,228	2,695	5,499	1,438	17,952	1,860	381	4,071	63	4,031	76,967	11.15%	2
Social Christian Unity Party	PUSC	1,027	2,298	1,657	1,992	6,555	207	1,364	3,895	609	1,856	1,179	1,788	4,361	1,683	11,899	1,679	1,030	2,715	950	2,136	50,880	7.37%	2
Broad Front	FA	160	1,035	1,122	1,696	4,525	67	1,294	3,649	168	2,916	387	1,615	1,053	330	7,807	627	197	1,834	24	1,741	32,247	4.67%	1
National Restoration Party	PRN	156	1,314	698	1,186	4,855	22	607	3,301	84	842	401	1,495	4,147	410	6,074	618	89	1,763	15	1,453	29,530	4.28%	1
Costa Rican Renewal Party	PRC	123	1,169	539	998	3,233	43	625	2,072	75	573	318	741	619	167	6,164	580	100	1,268	33	1,123	20,563	2.98%	1
National Integration Party	PIN	46	256	998	333	1,774	36	135	1,249	16	432	67	318	209	48	1,696	95	126	364	4	335	8,537	1.24%	0
Patriotic Alliance	AP	390	295	219	283	1,331	48	287	626	62	395	74	520	518	145	1,363	326	34	330	9	255	7,510	1.09%	0
Elderly Alliance Party	PAM	73	166	86	74	413	16	69	267	26	88	34	69	150	86	766	68	26	100	25	122	2,724	0.39%	0
Valid votes		9,687	28,482	24,658	31,371	98,082	3,100	28,506	58,764	5,156	30,230	11,974	28,805	62,846	17,093	150,879	19,553	6,671	38,992	2,894	32,593	690,336	100.00%	20
Blank votes		165	213	295	209	634	78	160	325	176	105	156	131	881	322	756	143	162	169	43	161	5,284	0.75%	
Rejected votes – other		177	458	433	378	1,272	37	299	668	77	252	221	234	1,072	208	1,709	272	121	382	43	324	8,637	1.23%	
Total polled		10,029	29,153	25,386	31,958	99,988	3,215	28,965	59,757	5,409	30,587	12,351	29,170	64,799	17,623	153,344	19,968	6,954	39,543	2,980	33,078	704,257	69.85%	
Registered electors		14,081	44,270	36,900	43,957	143,636	4,789	39,855	85,706	8,009	41,139	17,043	39,778	96,629	24,260	226,027	27,313	10,376	55,673	3,963	44,773	1,008,177		
Turnout		71.22%	65.85%	68.80%	72.70%	69.61%	67.13%	72.68%	69.72%	67.54%	74.35%	72.47%	73.33%	67.06%	72.64%	67.84%	73.11%	67.02%	71.03%	75.20%	73.88%	69.85%		

The following candidates were elected: Óscar Alfaro Zamora (PLN); Gustavo Arias Navarro (PAC); Carlos Avendaño Calvo (PRN); Gloria Bejarano Almada (PUSC); Francisco Chacón González (PLN); Rita Gabriela Chaves Casanova (PASE); Xinia Espinoza Espinoza (PLN); Luis Fishman Zonzinski (PUSC); Alicia Fournier Vargas (PLN); Víctor Emilio Granados Calvo (PASE); Viviana Martín Salazar (PLN); Juan Carlos Mendoza García (PAC); Carmen Muñoz (PAC); Justo Orozco (PRC); Mirna Patricia Pérez Hegg (PML); Damaris Quintana Porras (PML); Annie Alicia Saborío Mora (PLN); María Eugenia Venegas (PAC); José María Villalta Flórez-Estrada (FA); and Guillermo Zúñiga Chaves (PLN).

==== 2000s ====
===== 2006 =====
Results of the 2006 general election held on 5 February 2006:

Party		Votes per canton																				Total votes	%	Seats
Party		Acosta	Ala- juelita	Aserrí	Curri- dabat	Desam- parados	Dota	Escazú	Goicoe- chea	León Cortés Castro	Montes de Oca	Mora	Moravia	Pérez Zeledón	Puriscal	San José	Santa Ana	Tarrazú	Tibás	Turru- bares	Vázquez de Coro- nado	Total votes	%	Seats
National Liberation Party	PLN	4,141	7,602	7,955	9,155	28,979	953	8,848	14,667	2,446	8,354	3,297	7,792	16,938	6,987	47,070	6,107	2,362	11,053	1,466	8,257	204,429	33.57%	7
Citizens' Action Party	PAC	2,236	4,732	4,902	7,214	20,453	944	5,689	14,536	858	8,745	2,297	7,632	16,091	3,996	35,125	3,300	1,676	10,702	403	7,519	159,050	26.12%	5
Libertarian Movement	PML	212	2,867	1,916	2,901	7,950	117	3,307	5,203	204	2,572	614	2,568	1,600	549	14,434	1,640	224	4,176	63	2,918	56,035	9.20%	2
Social Christian Unity Party	PUSC	731	2,170	1,061	1,630	4,166	264	978	3,373	544	1,088	1,519	1,174	5,937	1,145	6,928	1,306	622	1,569	522	1,107	37,834	6.21%	2
National Restoration Party	PRN	107	1,815	805	1,136	5,670	10	718	4,040	42	1,033	356	1,436	2,924	360	8,070	585	141	1,920	6	1,735	32,909	5.40%	1
Accessibility without Exclusion	PASE	297	1,257	1,171	1,044	4,516	83	996	2,226	98	981	409	987	872	550	6,815	606	193	1,415	49	1,125	25,690	4.22%	1
Broad Front	FA	132	611	473	789	2,420	36	661	1,858	75	1,245	180	761	1,129	211	4,802	353	62	1,155	12	786	17,751	2.91%	1
National Union Party	PUN	83	589	545	767	2,051	36	812	1,701	54	1,127	208	790	736	278	4,689	562	76	1,030	7	663	16,804	2.76%	1
Union for Change Party	PUPC	62	475	326	910	1,883	50	858	1,256	106	789	250	672	471	171	3,303	387	68	920	18	678	13,653	2.24%	0
Homeland First Party	PPP	134	566	721	495	2,032	39	528	1,119	72	408	178	425	1,478	241	2,713	281	64	721	14	489	12,718	2.09%	0
Costa Rican Renewal Party	PRC	164	666	390	693	1,894	47	485	1,152	48	385	198	395	732	100	3,419	321	79	965	11	553	12,697	2.09%	0
National Integration Party	PIN	27	231	215	311	1,771	4	120	705	8	380	53	260	139	53	1,470	76	14	286	6	372	6,501	1.07%	0
Democratic Force	FD	29	194	126	214	558	16	143	546	19	323	42	278	167	56	1,102	129	19	341	5	348	4,655	0.76%	0
New Feminist League Party	NLF	27	82	61	119	271	11	135	220	35	216	35	96	154	43	471	64	14	144	4	155	2,357	0.39%	0
United Left	IU	36	89	61	77	329	7	46	245	3	125	15	91	58	22	580	37	7	103	7	99	2,037	0.33%	0
Patriotic Union	UP	20	82	65	75	255	6	71	154	10	203	24	70	103	68	493	72	8	106	9	69	1,963	0.32%	0
Democratic Nationalist Alliance	ADN	12	89	40	61	161	2	131	126	6	77	21	84	68	48	502	49	5	305	3	94	1,884	0.31%	0
Valid votes		8,450	24,117	20,833	27,591	85,359	2,625	24,526	53,127	4,628	28,051	9,696	25,511	49,597	14,878	141,986	15,875	5,634	36,911	2,605	26,967	608,967	100.00%	20
Blank votes		104	166	232	135	490	49	127	223	92	84	110	94	568	176	566	111	83	151	25	111	3,697	0.59%	
Rejected votes – other		164	544	395	436	1,358	50	340	741	85	292	195	235	978	228	1,925	239	74	515	52	453	9,299	1.50%	
Total polled		8,718	24,827	21,460	28,162	87,207	2,724	24,993	54,091	4,805	28,427	10,001	25,840	51,143	15,282	144,477	16,225	5,791	37,577	2,682	27,531	621,963	66.39%	
Registered electors		12,669	40,385	33,004	40,577	131,969	4,360	35,873	81,526	7,133	39,889	14,799	36,472	84,341	21,638	221,870	23,405	9,252	55,159	3,604	38,901	936,826		
Turnout		68.81%	61.48%	65.02%	69.40%	66.08%	62.48%	69.67%	66.35%	67.36%	71.27%	67.58%	70.85%	60.64%	70.63%	65.12%	69.32%	62.59%	68.12%	74.42%	70.77%	66.39%		

The following candidates were elected: Mayi Antillón Guerrero (PLN); Evita Arguedas Maklouf (PML); Ana Helena Chacón (PUSC); Silvia Charpentier Brenes (PLN); José Manuel Echandi Meza (PUN); Elizabeth Fonseca Corrales (PAC); Óscar López Arias (PASE); Guyón Massey Mora (PRN); José Merino del Río (FA); Alexander Mora (PLN); Andrea Morales Díaz (PAC); Óscar Núñez Calvo (PLN); Francisco Antonio Pacheco Fernández (PLN); Mario Quirós Lara (PML); Alberto Salom Echeverría (PAC); Jorge Eduardo Sánchez Sibaja (PUSC); Ronald Solís Bolaños (PAC); Ofelia Taitelbaum (PLN); Federico Tinoco Carmona (PLN); and Leda Zamora Chaves (PAC).

===== 2002 =====
Results of the 2002 general election held on 3 February 2002:

Party		Votes per canton																				Total votes	%	Seats
Party		Acosta	Ala- juelita	Aserrí	Curri- dabat	Desam- parados	Dota	Escazú	Goicoe- chea	León Cortés Castro	Montes de Oca	Mora	Moravia	Pérez Zeledón	Puriscal	San José	Santa Ana	Tarrazú	Tibás	Turru- bares	Vázquez de Coro- nado	Total votes	%	Seats
Social Christian Unity Party	PUSC	3,154	6,497	5,114	6,065	20,994	952	5,692	12,820	2,005	6,148	2,721	5,456	13,583	4,828	38,346	3,807	2,521	9,682	937	5,817	157,139	27.07%	6
Citizens' Action Party	PAC	772	4,467	3,697	8,045	19,336	594	5,909	14,630	380	10,116	2,053	8,304	12,033	2,448	41,135	3,351	685	11,638	188	6,783	156,564	26.97%	6
National Liberation Party	PLN	3,877	4,735	6,186	4,678	20,556	819	4,792	10,106	1,941	4,535	2,897	4,220	16,478	5,697	29,135	3,703	2,037	7,241	1,207	5,378	140,218	24.15%	5
Libertarian Movement	PML	307	3,407	1,934	3,657	9,435	78	3,751	6,851	101	3,814	701	3,076	2,207	693	18,802	1,763	151	4,780	42	2,835	68,385	11.78%	2
Costa Rican Renewal Party	PRC	85	1,425	473	809	3,142	42	728	2,248	43	548	314	1,006	1,584	305	5,091	513	75	1,381	14	813	20,639	3.56%	1
National Integration Party	PIN	39	407	268	448	3,116	15	238	1,275	14	591	68	366	304	86	2,416	123	15	447	6	433	10,675	1.84%	0
Democratic Force	FD	113	429	313	463	1,298	15	270	1,032	26	748	139	437	649	115	2,455	231	41	641	19	641	10,075	1.74%	0
General Union Party	PUGEN	37	144	142	159	521	14	167	391	8	187	48	177	557	51	1,080	162	15	210	10	143	4,223	0.73%	0
National Patriotic Party	PPN	9	213	101	194	479	4	100	445	9	159	34	198	92	40	996	53	6	245	4	116	3,497	0.60%	0
Coalition Change 2000	CC2000	16	147	219	177	495	5	171	290	7	185	22	94	122	36	879	90	7	230	1	120	3,313	0.57%	0
National Christian Alliance	ANC	33	118	80	100	375	4	74	523	19	141	42	78	175	54	672	51	27	172	11	115	2,864	0.49%	0
National Rescue Party	PRN	28	93	42	50	210	3	48	131	7	94	12	74	61	33	475	67	11	128	2	54	1,623	0.28%	0
Independent Workers' Party	PIO	8	127	26	61	189	3	111	66	2	52	18	30	82	18	403	26	7	82	4	27	1,342	0.23%	0
Valid votes		8,478	22,209	18,595	24,906	80,146	2,548	22,051	50,808	4,562	27,318	9,069	23,516	47,927	14,404	141,885	13,940	5,598	36,877	2,445	23,275	580,557	100.00%	20
Blank votes		125	230	292	163	575	80	160	296	99	112	128	99	757	337	812	144	105	200	55	149	4,918	0.83%	
Rejected votes – other		126	447	343	337	1,082	32	324	608	62	238	172	207	675	199	1,786	256	59	426	46	272	7,697	1.30%	
Total polled		8,729	22,886	19,230	25,406	81,803	2,660	22,535	51,712	4,723	27,668	9,369	23,822	49,359	14,940	144,483	14,340	5,762	37,503	2,546	23,696	593,172	69.31%	
Registered electors		11,614	36,288	28,795	36,005	119,067	3,905	31,860	75,145	6,370	37,640	12,880	32,863	73,755	19,655	212,525	20,202	8,345	53,068	3,347	32,494	855,823		
Turnout		75.16%	63.07%	66.78%	70.56%	68.70%	68.12%	70.73%	68.82%	74.14%	73.51%	72.74%	72.49%	66.92%	76.01%	67.98%	70.98%	69.05%	70.67%	76.07%	72.92%	69.31%		

The following candidates were elected: Ronaldo Alfaro García (PML); Carlos Avendaño Calvo (PRC); Epsy Campbell Barr (PAC); Rodrigo Alberto Carazo Zeledón (PAC); Laura Chinchilla (PLN); José Miguel Corrales Bolaños (PLN); Kyra de la Rosa Alvarado (PLN); Aida Faingezicht Waisleder (PUSC); Bernal Jiménez Monge (PLN); Rolando Laclé Castro (PUSC); Federico Malavassi Calvo (PML); Edgar Mohs Villalta (PUSC); Elvia Navarro Vargas (PAC); Margarita Peñon Góngora (PAC); Paulino Rodríguez Mena (PLN); Ricardo Toledo Carranza (PUSC); Gloria Valerín Rodríguez (PUSC); Rafael Ángel Varela Granados (PAC); Juan José Vargas Fallas (PAC); and Olman Vargas Cubero (PUSC).

==== 1990s ====
===== 1998 =====
Results of the 1998 general election held on 1 February 1998:

Party		Votes per canton																				Total votes	%	Seats
Party		Acosta	Ala- juelita	Aserrí	Curri- dabat	Desam- parados	Dota	Escazú	Goicoe- chea	León Cortés Castro	Montes de Oca	Mora	Moravia	Pérez Zeledón	Puriscal	San José	Santa Ana	Tarrazú	Tibás	Turru- bares	Vázquez de Coro- nado	Total votes	%	Seats
Social Christian Unity Party	PUSC	5,095	7,538	6,599	7,233	25,347	1,380	7,251	15,729	2,952	7,669	3,149	6,421	18,986	6,494	49,503	4,903	3,365	12,023	1,214	5,855	198,706	37.60%	8
National Liberation Party	PLN	2,836	6,493	6,318	7,281	26,242	1,022	6,753	16,162	1,377	8,091	2,755	7,031	17,317	5,627	49,192	4,685	1,791	13,013	1,229	6,196	191,411	36.21%	8
Democratic Force	FD	163	1,519	858	1,633	5,193	53	1,038	4,078	64	2,260	841	2,021	1,006	679	10,482	730	67	3,109	55	2,767	38,616	7.31%	2
National Integration Party	PIN	49	889	598	1,067	5,079	34	721	2,963	13	1,355	215	1,200	278	204	7,142	389	27	1,609	11	944	24,787	4.69%	1
Libertarian Movement	PML	40	845	474	1,702	2,838	20	1,144	2,521	18	2,075	193	1,364	606	157	7,211	375	18	1,962	11	946	24,520	4.64%	1
Costa Rican Renewal Party	PRC	44	722	170	403	1,783	17	368	1,175	5	628	216	560	553	96	4,670	152	51	933	12	354	12,912	2.44%	1
Democratic Party	PD	18	494	302	332	1,587	5	525	916	39	375	59	289	95	96	2,143	218	7	633	4	311	8,448	1.60%	0
General Union Party	PUGEN	35	552	588	94	953	13	57	257	14	69	11	63	3,302	64	836	120	12	163	5	38	7,246	1.37%	0
New Democratic Party	NPD	8	169	82	302	723	2	1,021	707	5	299	175	348	89	103	1,616	66	4	358	7	268	6,352	1.20%	0
United People	PU	74	199	86	175	633	3	171	515	1	285	39	184	96	19	1,540	139	3	343	7	121	4,633	0.88%	0
National Christian Alliance	ANC	4	173	87	190	579	2	113	551	3	183	17	184	144	14	1,154	60	6	263	2	155	3,884	0.73%	0
National Rescue Party	PRN	10	65	36	147	279	7	135	228	2	378	19	350	136	20	796	181	8	197	3	64	3,061	0.58%	0
National Independent Party	PNI	10	180	92	142	264	3	87	422	3	119	20	84	49	17	744	47	7	174	4	77	2,545	0.48%	0
Independent Party	PI	2	101	332	36	128	0	63	103	0	49	5	54	39	10	348	31	1	97	0	22	1,421	0.27%	0
Valid votes		8,388	19,939	16,622	20,737	71,628	2,561	19,447	46,327	4,496	23,835	7,714	20,153	42,696	13,600	137,377	12,096	5,367	34,877	2,564	18,118	528,542	100.00%	21
Blank votes		116	176	216	139	492	58	158	203	83	95	99	103	559	274	635	114	69	160	51	98	3,898	0.72%	
Rejected votes – other		222	511	440	320	1,207	29	355	651	114	391	227	273	999	275	2,097	269	52	515	61	304	9,312	1.72%	
Total polled		8,726	20,626	17,278	21,196	73,327	2,648	19,960	47,181	4,693	24,321	8,040	20,529	44,254	14,149	140,109	12,479	5,488	35,552	2,676	18,520	541,752	69.10%	
Registered electors		11,002	32,735	24,837	30,410	106,121	3,659	28,594	69,651	5,911	34,131	11,232	28,568	64,560	18,255	209,688	17,403	7,394	50,825	3,356	25,723	784,055		
Turnout		79.31%	63.01%	69.57%	69.70%	69.10%	72.37%	69.80%	67.74%	79.39%	71.26%	71.58%	71.86%	68.55%	77.51%	66.82%	71.71%	74.22%	69.95%	79.74%	72.00%	69.10%		

The following candidates were elected: Vanessa Castro Mora (PUSC); Guillermo Constenla Umaña (PLN); Rina Contreras López (PUSC); Luis Fishman Zonzinski (PUSC); Alicia Fournier Vargas (PLN); Daniel Gallardo Monge (PLN); Otto Guevara (PML); José Merino del Río (FD); Guido Alberto Monge Fernández (PLN); Walter Muñoz Céspedes (PIN); José Manuel Núñez González (FD); Justo Orozco (PRC); Abel Pacheco (PUSC); Sonia Picado Sotela (PLN); Jorge Eduardo Sánchez (PUSC); Joycelyn Sawyers Sawyers (PLN); Alex Sibaja Granados (PLN); Álvaro Trejos Fonseca (PUSC); Carlos Vargas Pagán (PUSC); Eliseo Vargas García (PUSC); and Jorge Luis Villanueva Badilla (PLN).

===== 1994 =====
Results of the 1994 general election held on 6 February 1994:

Party		Votes per canton																				Total votes	%	Seats
Party		Acosta	Ala- juelita	Aserrí	Curri- dabat	Desam- parados	Dota	Escazú	Goicoe- chea	León Cortés Castro	Montes de Oca	Mora	Moravia	Pérez Zeledón	Puriscal	San José	Santa Ana	Tarrazú	Tibás	Turru- bares	Vázquez de Coro- nado	Total votes	%	Seats
National Liberation Party	PLN	4,813	8,698	9,414	8,707	34,228	1,747	8,723	21,234	2,831	10,254	3,951	8,415	23,629	7,668	65,904	5,605	2,735	16,248	1,369	7,690	253,863	44.21%	10
Social Christian Unity Party	PUSC	3,296	9,246	6,858	8,416	29,109	912	8,463	20,376	1,513	10,180	3,508	8,060	16,789	6,109	64,239	5,343	2,216	15,633	1,178	6,847	228,291	39.76%	9
Democratic Force	FD	144	2,030	720	2,122	6,403	35	1,668	5,978	119	3,203	407	2,702	482	523	14,158	1,028	106	3,693	34	2,120	47,675	8.30%	2
General Union Party	PUGEN	43	484	532	292	2,520	18	323	845	23	269	65	238	4,047	88	2,667	125	38	597	5	190	13,409	2.34%	0
People's Vanguard Party	PVP	68	431	198	385	1,447	23	311	1,142	25	644	71	345	339	136	3,790	201	25	709	12	244	10,546	1.84%	0
National Christian Alliance	ANC	43	552	175	282	1,302	7	329	955	14	293	82	266	491	101	2,700	202	54	669	11	252	8,780	1.53%	0
National Independent Party	PNI	24	240	90	544	705	17	378	787	12	673	155	450	159	93	3,243	166	13	650	17	169	8,585	1.50%	0
Independent Party	PI	9	156	60	115	378	2	334	255	2	94	40	79	60	33	1,087	53	6	221	4	43	3,031	0.53%	0
Valid votes		8,440	21,837	18,047	20,863	76,092	2,761	20,529	51,572	4,539	25,610	8,279	20,555	45,996	14,751	157,788	12,723	5,193	38,420	2,630	17,555	574,180	100.00%	21
Blank votes		122	244	214	148	656	62	188	281	113	139	99	100	744	299	805	139	79	193	52	148	4,825	0.82%	
Rejected votes – other		209	401	353	279	1,068	34	259	607	98	221	182	209	1,010	225	1,867	166	88	444	39	273	8,032	1.37%	
Total polled		8,771	22,482	18,614	21,290	77,816	2,857	20,976	52,460	4,750	25,970	8,560	20,864	47,750	15,275	160,460	13,028	5,360	39,057	2,721	17,976	587,037	80.01%	
Registered electors		10,347	28,824	22,227	26,078	96,118	3,533	26,286	65,836	5,572	32,296	10,231	25,475	58,955	17,766	207,773	15,939	6,633	49,063	3,103	21,670	733,725		
Turnout		84.77%	78.00%	83.74%	81.64%	80.96%	80.87%	79.80%	79.68%	85.25%	80.41%	83.67%	81.90%	80.99%	85.98%	77.23%	81.74%	80.81%	79.61%	87.69%	82.95%	80.01%		

The following candidates were elected: Antonio Álvarez Desanti (PLN); Bernal Aragón Barquero (PUSC); Guillermo Arguedas Rivera (PUSC); Alberto Cañas Escalante (PLN); Mario Carazo Zeledón (PUSC); Edelberto Castiblanco Vargas (PLN); Anabella Diez Martín (PUSC); Hernán Fournier Origgi (PUSC); Ricardo Garrón Figuls (PLN); Rodrigo Alberto Gutiérrez Schwanhauser (FD); José Antonio Lobo Solera (PUSC); Rodolfo Méndez Mata (PUSC); Francisco Antonio Pacheco Fernández (PLN); Sandra Piszk Feinzilber (PLN); María Lidya Sánchez Valverde (PLN); Ottón Solís (PLN); Gerardo Trejos Salas (FD); Constantino Urcuyo Fournier (PUSC); Óscar Ureña Ureña (PLN); Rafael Ángel Villalta Fernández (PUSC); and Saúl Weisleder (PLN).

===== 1990 =====
Results of the 1990 general election held on 4 February 1990:

Party		Votes per canton																				Total votes	%	Seats
Party		Acosta	Ala- juelita	Aserrí	Curri- dabat	Desam- parados	Dota	Escazú	Goicoe- chea	León Cortés Castro	Montes de Oca	Mora	Moravia	Pérez Zeledón	Puriscal	San José	Santa Ana	Tarrazú	Tibás	Turru- bares	Vázquez de Coro- nado	Total votes	%	Seats
Social Christian Unity Party	PUSC	3,689	8,771	6,602	7,777	29,369	1,153	8,205	20,930	1,604	10,176	3,521	8,233	16,326	6,159	69,788	5,621	2,365	16,925	1,233	6,316	234,763	44.41%	10
National Liberation Party	PLN	3,556	7,053	8,031	7,427	29,770	1,302	8,197	18,881	2,455	10,196	3,254	7,667	20,297	7,379	62,746	5,072	2,183	14,747	1,096	6,442	227,751	43.08%	9
United People	PU	125	1,161	342	737	3,039	26	694	3,550	29	1,381	84	1,042	388	143	8,225	399	19	1,834	8	541	23,767	4.50%	1
General Union Party	PUGEN	209	529	341	788	2,890	45	751	1,566	130	989	140	640	3,237	323	5,401	331	55	1,171	17	366	19,919	3.77%	1
National Christian Alliance	ANC	28	422	130	236	1,412	13	322	1,170	7	506	206	328	453	121	3,217	178	33	826	5	235	9,848	1.86%	0
National Independent Party	PNI	65	503	134	120	582	4	142	444	14	271	66	150	208	141	1,391	59	21	295	6	187	4,803	0.91%	0
Party of Progress	PdP	13	54	22	158	307	5	154	410	8	480	18	162	86	24	1,324	63	5	235	8	166	3,702	0.70%	0
Independent Party	PI	12	178	30	55	262	3	128	371	3	110	65	132	47	34	1,088	35	8	625	1	160	3,347	0.63%	0
Militant Workers; Revolutionary Party	PRTL	16	30	23	16	87	1	30	89	5	37	9	25	45	14	223	11	5	53	5	18	742	0.14%	0
Valid votes		7,713	18,701	15,655	17,314	67,718	2,552	18,623	47,411	4,255	24,146	7,363	18,379	41,087	14,338	153,403	11,769	4,694	36,711	2,379	14,431	528,642	100.00%	21
Blank votes		159	220	237	105	609	76	163	306	126	119	100	104	790	339	890	117	76	249	47	148	4,980	0.92%	
Rejected votes – other		192	531	317	298	1,260	46	357	648	134	262	179	187	1,058	246	2,043	206	90	521	44	256	8,875	1.64%	
Total polled		8,064	19,452	16,209	17,717	69,587	2,674	19,143	48,365	4,515	24,527	7,642	18,670	42,935	14,923	156,336	12,092	4,860	37,481	2,470	14,835	542,497	81.47%	
Registered electors		9,645	24,032	19,398	21,226	84,007	3,299	23,438	59,169	5,404	29,944	9,057	22,378	54,029	17,262	196,907	14,384	5,967	45,844	2,862	17,668	665,920		
Turnout		83.61%	80.94%	83.56%	83.47%	82.83%	81.05%	81.68%	81.74%	83.55%	81.91%	84.38%	83.43%	79.47%	86.45%	79.40%	84.07%	81.45%	81.76%	86.30%	83.97%	81.47%		

The following candidates were elected: Daniel Aguilar González (PUSC); Carlos Castro Arias (PUSC); Víctor Evelio Castro Retana (PLN); Alberto Esquivel Volio (PLN); Santana Esquivel Ramírez (PLN); Carlos Alberto Fernández Vega (PUGEN); Daniel Gallardo Monge (PLN); Rodrigo Alberto Gutiérrez Sáenz (PU); Rolando Laclé Castro (PUSC); Hugo Alfonso Muñoz Quesada (PLN); William Rodolfo Muñoz Céspedes (PUSC); Karen Olsen Beck (PLN); Rodrigo Oreamuno Blanco (PLN); Miguel Ángel Rodríguez (PUSC); Jorge Eduardo Sánchez (PUSC); Óscar Soley (PLN); Alejandro Soto Zúñiga (PLN); Roberto Tovar Faja (PUSC); Juan José Trejos Fonseca (PUSC); Blanca Nury Vargas Aguilar (PUSC); and Eliseo Vargas García (PUSC).

==== 1980s ====
===== 1986 =====
Results of the 1986 general election held on 2 February 1986:

Party		Votes per canton																				Total votes	%	Seats
Party		Acosta	Ala- juelita	Aserrí	Curri- dabat	Desam- parados	Dota	Escazú	Goicoe- chea	León Cortés Castro	Montes de Oca	Mora	Moravia	Pérez Zeledón	Puriscal	San José	Santa Ana	Tarrazú	Tibás	Turru- bares	Vázquez de Coro- nado	Total votes	%	Seats
National Liberation Party	PLN	3,804	6,780	7,475	6,897	29,340	1,291	7,929	19,661	2,534	10,629	3,315	7,866	20,877	7,485	67,530	5,020	2,183	15,245	1,238	6,236	233,335	49.55%	10
Social Christian Unity Party	PUSC	2,856	6,776	5,152	5,978	21,805	991	6,617	17,014	1,250	9,025	2,901	6,536	13,667	5,221	58,682	4,429	1,746	13,500	979	4,727	189,852	40.32%	9
United People	PU	73	744	216	463	1,747	13	821	1,654	39	1,081	64	582	185	166	6,231	255	35	1,453	8	319	16,149	3.43%	1
People's Alliance Coalition	CAP	116	590	382	383	1,804	29	405	1,840	28	790	54	529	288	70	4,879	229	17	854	5	223	13,515	2.87%	1
National Christian Alliance	ANC	134	537	180	177	1,103	12	230	861	40	410	46	284	623	88	3,168	107	54	653	3	129	8,839	1.88%	0
National Republican Party	PNR	69	132	97	97	354	21	116	345	27	164	91	124	237	120	1,293	74	35	212	18	78	3,704	0.79%	0
General Union Party	PUGEN	5	28	17	53	132	47	48	112	3	78	14	62	1,613	14	436	20	20	92	0	21	2,815	0.60%	0
Independent Party	PI	16	100	45	76	339	1	78	275	14	99	25	86	35	30	1,155	38	9	232	4	51	2,708	0.58%	0
Valid votes		7,073	15,687	13,564	14,124	56,624	2,405	16,244	41,762	3,935	22,276	6,510	16,069	37,525	13,194	143,374	10,172	4,099	32,241	2,255	11,784	470,917	100.00%	21
Blank votes		108	215	210	79	474	68	135	257	108	118	86	89	582	268	718	96	77	178	27	106	3,999	0.83%	
Rejected votes – other		199	398	298	220	971	68	338	658	79	241	144	183	802	248	2,143	182	52	493	55	201	7,973	1.65%	
Total polled		7,380	16,300	14,072	14,423	58,069	2,541	16,717	42,677	4,122	22,635	6,740	16,341	38,909	13,710	146,235	10,450	4,228	32,912	2,337	12,091	482,889	81.76%	
Registered electors		8,771	20,540	16,985	17,149	70,214	3,120	20,661	52,164	4,819	27,604	7,953	19,572	47,117	15,890	183,047	12,445	5,137	40,249	2,730	14,473	590,640		
Turnout		84.14%	79.36%	82.85%	84.10%	82.70%	81.44%	80.91%	81.81%	85.54%	82.00%	84.75%	83.49%	82.58%	86.28%	79.89%	83.97%	82.30%	81.77%	85.60%	83.54%	81.76%		

The following candidates were elected: José Alberto Aguilar Sevilla (PLN); Carlos Araya Guillén (PUSC); José María Borbón Arias (PUSC); Mario Enrique Carvajal Herrera (PLN); Luis Manuel Chacón Jiménez (PUSC); Juan Luis Delgado Monge (PUSC); Alberto Fait Lizano (PLN); Luis Fishman Zonzinski (PUSC); Mireya Guevara Fallas (PLN); Etelberto Jiménez Piedra (PLN); Rose Marie Karpinsky Dodero (PLN); Rodolfo Méndez Mata (PUSC); Johnny Ramírez Azofeifa (PLN); Óscar Manuel Saborío Vega (PUSC); Alex Solís Fallas (PLN); Javier Solís Herrera (PU); Cristian Tattenbach Iglesias (PUSC); Humberto Vargas Carbonell (CAP); José Ademar Vega Chaves (PUSC); Leonel Villalobos Salazar (PLN); and Fernando Volio Jiménez (PLN).

===== 1982 =====
Results of the 1982 general election held on 7 February 1982:

Party		Votes per canton																				Total votes	%	Seats
Party		Acosta	Ala- juelita	Aserrí	Curri- dabat	Desam- parados	Dota	Escazú	Goicoe- chea	León Cortés Castro	Montes de Oca	Mora	Moravia	Pérez Zeledón	Puriscal	San José	Santa Ana	Tarrazú	Tibás	Turru- bares	Vázquez de Coro- nado	Total votes	%	Seats
National Liberation Party	PLN	3,515	6,731	6,783	5,607	26,452	1,525	7,025	17,350	2,328	9,565	3,021	6,589	19,522	7,793	65,397	4,409	2,011	14,155	1,252	5,271	216,301	55.11%	12
Unity Coalition	CU	1,316	3,649	2,749	2,892	12,738	580	3,834	10,396	610	5,127	1,710	3,824	7,466	3,033	36,935	2,596	1,152	8,239	479	2,549	111,874	28.50%	6
United People	PU	142	1,280	480	751	3,311	45	858	3,303	46	1,828	125	981	685	158	11,153	415	30	2,205	9	515	28,320	7.22%	2
National Movement	MN	180	316	282	508	1,001	85	914	1,582	89	1,606	160	753	840	162	7,875	355	238	1,079	24	437	18,486	4.71%	1
National Democratic Party	PND	407	163	83	212	407	8	186	549	7	476	22	232	133	102	2,270	51	17	364	7	75	5,771	1.47%	0
Costa Rican Concord Party	PCC	19	50	38	143	234	16	212	411	10	483	19	215	132	16	2,260	57	2	319	0	58	4,694	1.20%	0
Peoples' Action Party	PAP	16	395	153	108	435	3	38	369	1	134	13	97	62	27	1,218	57	4	395	1	20	3,546	0.90%	0
Independent Party	PI	25	77	32	111	330	5	40	121	5	93	9	32	80	34	440	43	8	60	4	23	1,572	0.40%	0
Democratic Party	PD	19	44	16	26	141	1	36	96	7	56	20	33	74	23	491	20	8	96	5	11	1,223	0.31%	0
National Liberal Progressive; Republican Party	PLPRN	13	32	54	11	210	3	18	38	6	18	8	11	73	9	166	4	2	20	1	11	708	0.18%	0
Valid votes		5,652	12,737	10,670	10,369	45,259	2,271	13,161	34,215	3,109	19,386	5,107	12,767	29,067	11,357	128,205	8,007	3,472	26,932	1,782	8,970	392,495	100.00%	21
Blank votes		139	165	154	57	413	61	122	184	101	112	68	90	552	232	684	98	74	152	35	84	3,577	0.89%	
Rejected votes – other		190	417	282	188	894	47	308	609	69	251	123	139	613	214	2,033	188	51	460	39	142	7,257	1.80%	
Total polled		5,981	13,319	11,106	10,614	46,566	2,379	13,591	35,008	3,279	19,749	5,298	12,996	30,232	11,803	130,922	8,293	3,597	27,544	1,856	9,196	403,329	79.06%	
Registered electors		7,720	17,683	14,296	12,952	58,040	2,823	17,467	44,335	4,055	24,728	6,515	16,138	38,707	14,193	167,431	10,314	4,379	34,398	2,310	11,667	510,151		
Turnout		77.47%	75.32%	77.69%	81.95%	80.23%	84.27%	77.81%	78.96%	80.86%	79.86%	81.32%	80.53%	78.10%	83.16%	78.19%	80.41%	82.14%	80.07%	80.35%	78.82%	79.06%		

The following candidates were elected: Óscar Aguilar Bulgarelli (CU); Sergio Erick Ardón Jiménez (PU); David Gerardo Fallas Alvarado (PLN); Hernán Garrón Salazar (PLN); Orlando Granados Ramírez (PLN); Luis Armando Gutiérrez Rodríguez (PLN); Bernal Jiménez Monge (PLN); Julio Enrique Jurado del Barco (PLN); Rolando Laclé Castro (CU); Guillermo Malavassi (MN); Matilde Marín Chinchilla (PLN); Jorge Arturo Monge Zamora (CU); Eduardo Mora Valverde (PU); Gerardo Mora Zúñiga (PLN); Benjamín Muñoz Retana (PLN); Rodolfo Arturo Navas Alvarado (PLN); Juan Rafael Rodríguez Calvo (CU); María Lidya Sánchez Valverde (PLN); Fernando José Trejos Escalante (CU); Juan José Trejos Fonseca (CU); and Jorge Luis Villanueva Badilla (PLN).

==== 1970s ====
===== 1978 =====
Results of the 1978 general election held on 5 February 1978:

Party		Votes per canton																				Total votes	%	Seats
Party		Acosta	Ala- juelita	Aserrí	Curri- dabat	Desam- parados	Dota	Escazú	Goicoe- chea	León Cortés Castro	Montes de Oca	Mora	Moravia	Pérez Zeledón	Puriscal	San José	Santa Ana	Tarrazú	Tibás	Turru- bares	Vázquez de Coro- nado	Total votes	%	Seats
Unity Coalition	CU	2,250	4,545	2,931	3,243	14,653	768	5,647	14,354	755	8,215	1,948	4,755	10,439	4,103	53,463	3,297	1,315	9,707	751	3,336	150,475	44.63%	10
National Liberation Party	PLN	2,181	3,517	3,690	2,467	14,512	960	3,932	9,983	1,706	5,113	2,001	3,024	12,621	5,000	38,681	2,568	1,281	7,376	829	3,119	124,561	36.95%	8
United People	PU	81	1,153	319	754	3,356	49	826	4,096	42	2,222	119	979	628	245	13,120	304	41	2,461	9	498	31,302	9.28%	2
Costa Rican Peoples' Front	FPC	396	404	175	280	1,237	5	242	1,171	11	590	31	199	267	62	4,635	72	16	646	7	103	10,549	3.13%	1
National Unification Party	PUN	52	229	604	164	579	22	258	548	42	381	117	186	270	546	2,512	105	62	400	12	131	7,220	2.14%	0
Workers' Socialist Organization Party	POST	25	149	144	97	494	4	133	462	12	204	26	121	127	58	1,624	35	4	278	6	56	4,059	1.20%	0
Republican Union Party	PUR	60	67	75	35	310	12	68	301	8	183	22	59	94	94	927	43	13	128	5	43	2,547	0.76%	0
Independent Party	PI	61	82	39	41	225	3	93	225	12	163	29	53	117	67	856	51	25	111	6	35	2,294	0.68%	0
National Independent Party	PNI	20	74	31	42	162	7	60	131	8	90	18	40	150	43	696	23	87	89	5	27	1,803	0.53%	0
Democratic Party	PD	17	46	27	17	112	6	32	85	7	51	9	18	57	21	587	10	6	87	3	13	1,211	0.36%	0
Costa Rican Concord Party	PCC	10	20	14	10	52	7	23	76	3	37	5	27	47	20	305	11	7	55	1	8	738	0.22%	0
National Labour Party	PLN	3	10	6	8	40	0	8	46	2	22	5	16	30	8	144	3	3	32	4	2	392	0.12%	0
Valid votes		5,156	10,296	8,055	7,158	35,732	1,843	11,322	31,478	2,608	17,271	4,330	9,477	24,847	10,267	117,550	6,522	2,860	21,370	1,638	7,371	337,151	100.00%	21
Blank votes		159	163	265	88	608	69	130	324	188	154	110	104	740	396	859	102	91	172	54	111	4,887	1.40%	
Rejected votes – other		259	386	364	199	888	35	315	613	79	317	152	152	604	270	2,483	170	65	435	46	163	7,995	2.28%	
Total polled		5,574	10,845	8,684	7,445	37,228	1,947	11,767	32,415	2,875	17,742	4,592	9,733	26,191	10,933	120,892	6,794	3,016	21,977	1,738	7,645	350,033	81.33%	
Registered electors		6,839	13,882	11,036	8,857	45,398	2,254	14,388	39,531	3,611	21,601	5,458	11,864	32,704	12,889	150,118	8,041	3,621	26,853	2,146	9,309	430,400		
Turnout		81.50%	78.12%	78.69%	84.06%	82.00%	86.38%	81.78%	82.00%	79.62%	82.14%	84.13%	82.04%	80.09%	84.82%	80.53%	84.49%	83.29%	81.84%	80.99%	82.12%	81.33%		

The following candidates were elected: Armando Aráuz Aguilar (PLN); Federico Villalobos Brenes Villalobos (CU); Carlos Manuel Castillo Morales (PLN); Rodolfo Cerdas Cruz (FPC); Marta Chinchilla Orozco (PLN); Mario Devandas (PU); Juan Carlos Fernández Saborío (PLN); Rafael Grillo Rivera (CU); Andrés Jenkins Dobles (CU); Rodrigo Madrigal Nieto (CU); Luis Antonio Monge Román (PLN); Juan Muñoz Valverde (PLN); Marcos Tulio Naranjo Carvajal (CU); Marcelo Prieto Jiménez (PLN); Alexis Quesada Murillo (CU); Mario Romero Arredondo (CU); Claudio Sánchez Fernández (PLN); Cristian Tattenbach Iglesias (CU); Roberto Tovar Faja (CU); Humberto Vargas Carbonell (PU); and José Ademar Vega Chaves (CU).

===== 1974 =====
Results of the 1974 general election held on 3 February 1974:

Party		Votes per canton																				Total votes	%	Seats
Party		Acosta	Ala- juelita	Aserrí	Curri- dabat	Desam- parados	Dota	Escazú	Goicoe- chea	León Cortés Castro	Montes de Oca	Mora	Moravia	Pérez Zeledón	Puriscal	San José	Santa Ana	Tarrazú	Tibás	Turru- bares	Vázquez de Coro- nado	Total votes	%	Seats
National Liberation Party	PLN	1,992	2,613	2,653	1,964	11,917	742	3,220	9,352	1,491	4,938	1,685	2,502	11,366	4,860	36,279	1,957	1,128	6,179	729	2,423	109,990	40.06%	9
National Unification Party	PUN	1,317	2,155	1,160	1,455	6,387	324	2,101	5,676	472	3,406	1,071	1,475	4,299	2,273	23,580	1,372	797	3,538	343	959	64,160	23.37%	5
Democratic Renewal Party	PRD	206	510	285	568	2,087	144	1,352	2,778	131	1,732	182	959	767	332	12,350	689	123	2,000	52	354	27,601	10.05%	2
National Independent Party	PNI	348	710	462	357	1,552	281	702	2,288	189	1,278	344	549	2,367	616	8,241	282	439	1,576	284	990	23,855	8.69%	2
National Republican Party	PRN	205	593	1,199	226	1,238	66	313	1,730	78	662	173	616	365	455	5,808	245	50	886	28	317	15,253	5.56%	1
Socialist Action Party	PASO	55	403	123	154	984	10	377	1,355	9	629	54	327	324	142	5,595	156	10	921	10	208	11,846	4.31%	1
Democratic Party	PD	16	183	54	183	843	30	209	1,075	5	613	26	203	357	36	3,182	50	17	529	2	136	7,749	2.82%	1
Christian Democratic Party	PDC	67	77	63	86	279	16	122	552	21	271	35	256	147	124	1,998	58	69	260	28	77	4,606	1.68%	0
Costa Rican Peoples' Front	FPC	74	63	27	60	421	2	84	387	9	328	32	69	76	32	2,011	20	3	235	3	30	3,966	1.44%	0
Costa Rican Socialist Party	PSC	17	70	27	142	283	4	70	793	4	335	15	123	47	36	1,687	18	9	209	5	36	3,930	1.43%	0
Independent Party	PI	188	41	24	21	101	18	65	95	16	101	26	11	92	94	580	21	15	69	12	28	1,618	0.59%	0
Valid votes		4,485	7,418	6,077	5,216	26,092	1,637	8,615	26,081	2,425	14,293	3,643	7,090	20,207	9,000	101,311	4,868	2,660	16,402	1,496	5,558	274,574	100.00%	21
Blank votes		142	151	236	63	453	66	138	271	149	141	84	85	653	277	851	101	76	162	58	121	4,278	1.50%	
Rejected votes – other		235	310	270	114	548	52	282	523	77	235	183	131	508	319	2,047	175	71	334	57	135	6,606	2.31%	
Total polled		4,862	7,879	6,583	5,393	27,093	1,755	9,035	26,875	2,651	14,669	3,910	7,306	21,368	9,596	104,209	5,144	2,807	16,898	1,611	5,814	285,458	80.40%	
Registered electors		6,280	10,118	8,422	6,502	32,914	2,059	11,066	32,937	3,241	18,004	4,720	8,920	28,020	11,716	130,417	6,191	3,319	20,809	2,159	7,251	355,065		
Turnout		77.42%	77.87%	78.16%	82.94%	82.31%	85.24%	81.65%	81.60%	81.80%	81.48%	82.84%	81.91%	76.26%	81.91%	79.90%	83.09%	84.57%	81.21%	74.62%	80.18%	80.40%		

The following candidates were elected: Fernando Altmann Ortiz (PUN); Rolando Araya Monge (PLN); Tirza Bustamante Guerrero (PNI); Rafael Ángel Calderón Fournier (PUN); Arnoldo Campos Brizuela (PD); Antonio Francisco Cañas Iraeta (PUN); Alfonso Carro Zúñiga (PLN); Mario Charpantier Gamboa (PLN); Juan José Echeverría Brealey (PRD); Carlos Luis Fernández Fallas (PLN); Sigurd Koberg Van Patten (PUN); Lalo Mora (PASO); Stanley Antonio Muñoz Sánchez (PLN); Rodolfo Piza Escalante (PNI); Miguel Ángel Quesada Niño (PRD); José Manuel Salazar Navarrete (PLN); Elías Soley Soler (PLN); Orlando Sotela Montagné (PRN); Juana Rosa Venegas Salazar (PLN); Guillermo Villalobos Arce (PUN); and Adelina Zonta Sánchez (PLN).

===== 1970 =====
Results of the 1970 general election held on 1 February 1970:

Party		Votes per canton																				Total votes	%	Seats
Party		Acosta	Ala- juelita	Aserrí	Curri- dabat	Desam- parados	Dota	Escazú	Goicoe- chea	León Cortés Castro	Montes de Oca	Mora	Moravia	Pérez Zeledón	Puriscal	San José	Santa Ana	Tarrazú	Tibás	Turru- bares	Vázquez de Coro- nado	Total votes	%	Seats
National Liberation Party	PLN	2,610	2,469	3,131	2,034	9,797	899	3,330	9,129	1,516	4,823	2,011	2,306	12,407	5,513	35,211	2,006	1,332	5,381	729	2,608	109,242	50.26%	11
National Unification Party	PUN	1,485	1,705	1,678	1,239	4,904	472	2,255	6,473	495	4,031	1,192	2,019	3,808	2,551	30,197	1,504	911	4,369	673	1,413	73,374	33.76%	7
Socialist Action Party	PASO	44	408	84	230	982	6	336	2,229	4	945	37	415	194	75	9,395	153	15	1,369	3	195	17,119	7.88%	2
Christian Democratic Party	PDC	24	119	33	121	468	9	161	954	10	431	25	280	183	46	4,136	76	16	538	6	69	7,705	3.54%	1
National Front Party	PFN	60	151	59	121	395	41	156	553	20	314	46	116	180	76	2,614	101	9	316	7	60	5,395	2.48%	0
National Union Party	PUN	21	57	28	38	158	2	75	369	7	172	11	72	83	22	1,688	27	8	214	0	34	3,086	1.42%	0
Costa Rican Renewal Movement	MRC	23	26	9	22	90	3	31	238	7	73	5	31	34	62	653	16	8	73	4	21	1,429	0.66%	0
Valid votes		4,267	4,935	5,022	3,805	16,794	1,432	6,344	19,945	2,059	10,789	3,327	5,239	16,889	8,345	83,894	3,883	2,299	12,260	1,422	4,400	217,350	100.00%	21
Blank votes		141	168	192	62	339	42	109	287	108	143	75	85	476	178	852	79	50	156	30	87	3,659	1.60%	
Rejected votes – other		144	300	141	133	521	21	273	644	84	339	111	151	467	233	2,539	137	61	452	62	165	6,978	3.06%	
Total polled		4,552	5,403	5,355	4,000	17,654	1,495	6,726	20,876	2,251	11,271	3,513	5,475	17,832	8,756	87,285	4,099	2,410	12,868	1,514	4,652	227,987	83.81%	
Registered electors		5,434	6,418	6,321	4,571	20,297	1,702	7,902	24,665	2,614	13,334	4,084	6,389	22,270	10,237	105,592	4,672	2,727	15,274	2,019	5,495	272,017		
Turnout		83.77%	84.19%	84.72%	87.51%	86.98%	87.84%	85.12%	84.64%	86.11%	84.53%	86.02%	85.69%	80.07%	85.53%	82.66%	87.74%	88.38%	84.25%	74.99%	84.66%	83.81%		

The following candidates were elected: Marcial Aguiluz Orellana (PASO); Manuel Carballo Quintana (PLN); Hernán Ramón Castro Hernández (PUN); Romilio Durán Picado (PLN); Jesús Manuel Fernández Morales (PDC); Antonio Jacob Habitt (PLN); Guillermo Jiménez Ramírez (PUN); Manuel Jiménez Borbón (PUN); Rolando Laclé Castro (PUN); Luis Alberto Monge (PLN); Edwin Muñoz Mora (PLN); Manuel Mora (PASO); Daniel Oduber Quirós (PLN); Óscar Saborío Alvarado (PUN); Gonzalo Solórzano González (PLN); Rafael Solórzano Saborío (PLN); Longino Soto Pacheco (PUN); Rafael Ángel Valladares Mora (PUN); Jenaro Valverde Marín (PLN); Carlos Manuel Villalobos Arias (PLN); and Teresa Zavaleta Durán (PLN).

==== 1960s ====
===== 1966 =====
Results of the 1966 general election held on 6 February 1966:

Party		Votes per canton																				Total votes	%	Seats
Party		Acosta	Ala- juelita	Aserrí	Curri- dabat	Desam- parados	Dota	Escazú	Goicoe- chea	León Cortés Castro	Montes de Oca	Mora	Moravia	Pérez Zeledón	Puriscal	San José	Santa Ana	Tarrazú	Tibás	Turru- bares	Vázquez de Coro- nado	Total votes	%	Seats
National Liberation Party	PLN	1,914	1,361	2,043	1,470	6,279	713	2,336	6,861	1,070	3,330	1,646	1,771	8,393	4,096	30,878	1,570	1,013	4,102	530	1,754	83,130	49.38%	10
National Unification Party	PUN	1,384	1,391	1,645	1,041	3,947	416	2,088	6,747	441	3,690	1,210	1,918	2,939	2,138	32,126	1,391	708	4,319	466	1,254	71,259	42.33%	9
Revolutionary Civic Union	UCR	133	201	104	246	513	53	215	1,125	42	626	82	278	590	192	6,444	117	69	806	21	217	12,074	7.17%	2
Democratic Party	PD	17	31	21	23	94	3	40	190	8	99	12	29	54	18	1,099	18	3	106	10	18	1,893	1.12%	0
Valid votes		3,448	2,984	3,813	2,780	10,833	1,185	4,679	14,923	1,561	7,745	2,950	3,996	11,976	6,444	70,547	3,096	1,793	9,333	1,027	3,243	168,356	100.00%	21
Blank votes		90	98	129	53	192	21	88	184	100	92	56	57	313	130	674	61	63	112	30	90	2,633	1.46%	
Rejected votes – other		241	292	241	189	592	32	306	865	96	439	167	197	743	311	4,037	176	117	568	78	207	9,894	5.47%	
Total polled		3,779	3,374	4,183	3,022	11,617	1,238	5,073	15,972	1,757	8,276	3,173	4,250	13,032	6,885	75,258	3,333	1,973	10,013	1,135	3,540	180,883	81.84%	
Registered electors		4,773	4,123	5,120	3,532	13,711	1,448	6,099	19,090	2,180	9,961	3,807	5,078	17,166	8,481	92,071	3,791	2,392	12,053	1,792	4,364	221,032		
Turnout		79.17%	81.83%	81.70%	85.56%	84.73%	85.50%	83.18%	83.67%	80.60%	83.08%	83.35%	83.69%	75.92%	81.18%	81.74%	87.92%	82.48%	83.07%	63.34%	81.12%	81.84%		

The following candidates were elected: René Aguilar Vargas (PUN); Harry Arrieta Quesada (PLN); Luis Alberto Azofeifa Solfa (PUN); Ramón Ramiro Barrantes Elizondo (PLN); Ramiro Brenes Gutiérrez (UCR); Rodrigo Carazo Odio (PLN); Mario Charpantier Gamboa (PLN); Carlos Luis Fernández Fallas (PLN); Cecilia González Salazar (PLN); Carlos José Gutiérrez Gutiérrez (PLN); José Hine García (PUN); Fernando Lara Bustamante (PUN); Matilde Marín Chinchilla (PLN); Frank Marshall (UCR); Manuel Antonio Mata Morales (PUN); José Luis Molina Quesada (PLN); Graciela Morales Flores (PUN); Orlando Sotela Montagné (PUN); Fernando José Trejos Escalante (PUN); Guillermo Villalobos Arce (PUN); and Fernando Volio Jiménez (PLN).

===== 1962 =====
Results of the 1962 general election held on 4 February 1962:

Party		Votes per canton																			Total votes	%	Seats
Party		Acosta	Ala- juelita	Aserrí	Curri- dabat	Desam- parados	Dota	Escazú	Goicoe- chea	Montes de Oca	Mora	Moravia	Pérez Zeledón	Puriscal	San José	Santa Ana	Tarrazú	Tibás	Turru- bares	Vázquez de Coro- nado	Total votes	%	Seats
National Liberation Party	PLN	2,016	980	1,800	1,324	5,760	724	2,295	5,560	2,774	1,588	1,458	7,385	3,751	26,341	1,404	1,984	3,560	564	1,777	73,045	47.06%	9
Republican Party	PR	860	1,086	874	772	2,690	192	1,372	4,826	2,429	930	1,548	1,001	1,240	27,609	986	482	3,408	229	818	53,352	34.38%	7
National Union Party	PUN	446	242	400	290	755	115	496	1,681	1,055	178	471	883	368	10,542	342	352	1,024	80	431	20,151	12.98%	3
Popular Democratic Action	PADP	16	38	24	29	104	3	46	441	172	19	50	52	24	2,707	25	6	307	6	35	4,104	2.64%	1
Solidarist Action Party	PAS	18	19	40	63	125	8	78	381	160	28	75	84	37	1,894	63	28	212	12	33	3,358	2.16%	0
National Depuration Movement	MDN	33	58	195	6	31	5	62	39	104	38	17	94	33	395	9	20	35	8	10	1,192	0.77%	0
Valid votes		3,389	2,423	3,333	2,484	9,465	1,047	4,349	12,928	6,694	2,781	3,619	9,499	5,453	69,488	2,829	2,872	8,546	899	3,104	155,202	100.00%	20
Blank votes		86	111	122	43	211	17	95	162	96	61	72	316	96	691	63	264	94	45	53	2,698	1.69%	
Rejected votes – other		66	52	150	38	119	7	90	151	76	44	38	158	97	811	80	44	89	21	42	2,173	1.36%	
Total polled		3,541	2,586	3,605	2,565	9,795	1,071	4,534	13,241	6,866	2,886	3,729	9,973	5,646	70,990	2,972	3,180	8,729	965	3,199	160,073	82.37%	
Registered electors		4,755	3,117	4,662	2,939	11,391	1,309	5,282	15,267	8,051	3,780	4,278	13,849	8,048	84,280	3,446	4,136	10,066	1,934	3,736	194,326		
Turnout		74.47%	82.96%	77.33%	87.27%	85.99%	81.82%	85.84%	86.73%	85.28%	76.35%	87.17%	72.01%	70.15%	84.23%	86.24%	76.89%	86.72%	49.90%	85.63%	82.37%		

The following candidates were elected: Álvaro Aguilar Peralta (PR); José Francisco Aguilar Bulgarelli (PR); Virgilio Calvo Sánchez (PR); Alberto Cañas Escalante (PLN); Antonio Francisco Cañas Iraeta (PR); Luis Castro Hernández (PLN); Carlos Espinach Escalante (PLN); Milton Gutiérrez Zamora (PR); Jorge Arturo Montero Castro (PLN); Edwin Muñoz Mora (PLN); Marco Tulio Naranjo Carvajal (PR); Fernando Ortuño Sobrado (PUN); Antonio Peña Chavarría (PUN); Teodoro Quirós Castro (PLN); Rogelio Ramos Valverde (PR); Fernando Salazar Navarrete (PLN); Rodolfo Solano Orfila (PLN); Rafael Solórzano Saborío (PLN); Julio César Suñol Leal (PADP); and Cristian Tattenbach Iglesias (PUN).

==== 1950s ====
===== 1958 =====
Results of the 1958 general election held on 2 February 1958:

Party		Votes per canton																			Total votes	%	Seats
Party		Acosta	Ala- juelita	Aserrí	Curri- dabat	Desam- parados	Dota	Escazú	Goicoe- chea	Montes de Oca	Mora	Moravia	Pérez Zeledón	Puriscal	San José	Santa Ana	Tarrazú	Tibás	Turru- bares	Vázquez de Coro- nado	Total votes	%	Seats
National Liberation Party	PLN	1,248	339	893	479	2,058	352	1,159	1,954	1,115	943	596	2,571	2,011	11,633	926	764	1,337	322	753	31,453	37.19%	6
National Republican Party	PRN	350	242	315	249	855	97	448	1,819	896	342	495	277	377	13,477	377	181	1,449	86	231	22,563	26.68%	4
National Union Party	PUN	388	216	523	166	837	152	405	1,078	809	348	251	580	730	8,165	303	386	679	223	375	16,614	19.64%	3
Independent Party	PI	160	72	158	171	491	106	325	527	275	68	215	1,094	309	3,657	122	212	397	32	136	8,527	10.08%	2
Revolutionary Civic Union	UCR	29	30	78	63	440	41	46	316	166	37	93	230	20	2,344	22	131	225	6	65	4,382	5.18%	1
Democratic Opposition Movement	MDO	15	8	16	17	38	6	19	75	28	11	16	20	16	342	10	9	31	4	14	695	0.82%	0
Democratic Party	PD	14	5	13	5	28	0	7	19	13	5	13	29	27	125	11	5	18	1	6	344	0.41%	0
Valid votes		2,204	912	1,996	1,150	4,747	754	2,409	5,788	3,302	1,754	1,679	4,801	3,490	39,743	1,771	1,688	4,136	674	1,580	84,578	100.00%	16
Blank votes		87	54	104	20	179	26	90	116	47	61	37	219	110	457	67	129	64	36	46	1,949	2.09%	
Rejected votes – other		139	85	197	75	523	24	244	506	311	141	136	281	162	3,014	162	117	389	27	93	6,626	7.11%	
Total polled		2,430	1,051	2,297	1,245	5,449	804	2,743	6,410	3,660	1,956	1,852	5,301	3,762	43,214	2,000	1,934	4,589	737	1,719	93,153	65.44%	
Registered electors		3,943	1,890	3,767	1,953	8,094	1,134	3,865	9,700	5,399	3,024	2,888	10,013	6,674	62,620	2,785	3,244	6,855	1,774	2,716	142,338		
Turnout		61.63%	55.61%	60.98%	63.75%	67.32%	70.90%	70.97%	66.08%	67.79%	64.68%	64.13%	52.94%	56.37%	69.01%	71.81%	59.62%	66.94%	41.54%	63.29%	65.44%		

The following candidates were elected: Rafael Ángel Calderón Guardia (PRN); Alfonso Carro Zúñiga (PLN); Florentino Castro Monge (PI); Hernán Cordero Zúñiga (PUN); Miguel Ángel Dávila Ugalde (PI); Enrique Fonseca Zúñiga (PRN); Fabio Fournier Jiménez (PUN); Fernando Lara Bustamante (PUN); Frank Marshall (UCR); Luis Alberto Monge (PLN); Álvaro Montero Padilla (PLN); Enrique Obregón Valverde (PLN); Daniel Oduber Quirós (PLN); Marta Saborío Fonseca (PRN); Guillermo Villalobos Arce (PRN); and Jorge Nilo Villalobos Dobles (PN).

===== 1953 =====
Results of the 1953 general election held on 26 July 1953:

Party		Votes per canton																			Total votes	%	Seats
Party		Acosta	Ala- juelita	Aserrí	Curri- dabat	Desam- parados	Dota	Escazú	Goicoe- chea	Montes de Oca	Mora	Moravia	Pérez Zeledón	Puriscal	San José	Santa Ana	Tarrazú	Tibás	Turru- bares	Vázquez de Coro- nado	Total votes	%	Seats
National Liberation Party	PLN	1,457	529	1,290	764	3,251	453	1,540	3,300	1,839	1,125	982	2,831	2,012	19,939	1,233	1,034	2,190	428	1,156	47,353	64.70%	10
Independent Republican Party	PRI	175	163	219	103	455	57	224	987	386	307	246	102	347	7,796	204	116	642	23	144	12,696	17.35%	3
Democratic Party	PD	321	133	218	79	331	59	287	581	246	162	147	301	510	3,971	245	185	299	187	81	8,343	11.40%	2
National Union Party	PUN	79	54	97	27	190	51	47	233	184	64	103	116	162	2,996	50	112	117	36	78	4,796	6.55%	1
Valid votes		2,032	879	1,824	973	4,227	620	2,098	5,101	2,655	1,658	1,478	3,350	3,031	34,702	1,732	1,447	3,248	674	1,459	73,188	100.00%	16
Blank votes		86	112	175	34	244	22	83	213	85	88	76	182	156	802	77	150	107	71	68	2,831	3.46%	
Rejected votes – other		185	82	137	53	255	26	258	484	212	211	95	242	323	2,458	156	152	266	70	93	5,758	7.04%	
Total polled		2,303	1,073	2,136	1,060	4,726	668	2,439	5,798	2,952	1,957	1,649	3,774	3,510	37,962	1,965	1,749	3,621	815	1,620	81,777	70.77%	
Registered electors		3,490	1,537	3,292	1,509	6,371	907	3,107	7,830	3,998	2,880	2,283	6,772	6,175	51,085	2,464	2,779	4,904	1,803	2,363	115,549		
Turnout		65.99%	69.81%	64.88%	70.25%	74.18%	73.65%	78.50%	74.05%	73.84%	67.95%	72.23%	55.73%	56.84%	74.31%	79.75%	62.94%	73.84%	45.20%	68.56%	70.77%		

The following candidates were elected: Otón Acosta Jiménez (PD); Luis Bonilla Castro (PLN); Gonzalo Castillo Rojas (PLN); Ana Rosa Chacón (PLN); Oldemar Chavarría Chinchilla (PLN); Otto Cortés Fernández (PLN); Mario Echandi Jiménez (PUN); Manuel Escalante Durán (PD); Gonzalo Facio Segreda (PLN); Francisco Jiménez Rodríguez (PLN); Guillermo Jiménez Ramírez (PRI); Julio Muñoz Fonseca (PRI); María Teresa Obregón Zamora (PLN); Francisco Orlich Bolmarcich (PLN); Manuel Antonio Quesada Chacón (PLN); and Jorge Volio Jiménez (PRI).

==== 1940s ====
===== 1949 =====
The following candidates were elected at the 1949 general election held on 4 October 1949: Abelardo Bonilla Baldares (PUN); Carlos Manuel Fernández Prestinary (PUN); Ricardo Esquivel Fernández (PUN); Roberto Fernández Durán (PUN); Mario Fernández Alfaro (PUN); Celso Gamboa Rodríguez (PC); Arnoldo Jiménez Zavaleta (PSD); Gonzalo Jiménez Flores (PUN); Fernando Lara Bustamante (PUN); Antonio Peña Cavaría (PUN); Antonio Picado Guerrero (PC); Eladio Trejos Flores (PDC); and Luis Uribe Rodríguez (PUN).
