= Víctor Hugo Morales Zapata =

Costa Rican politician

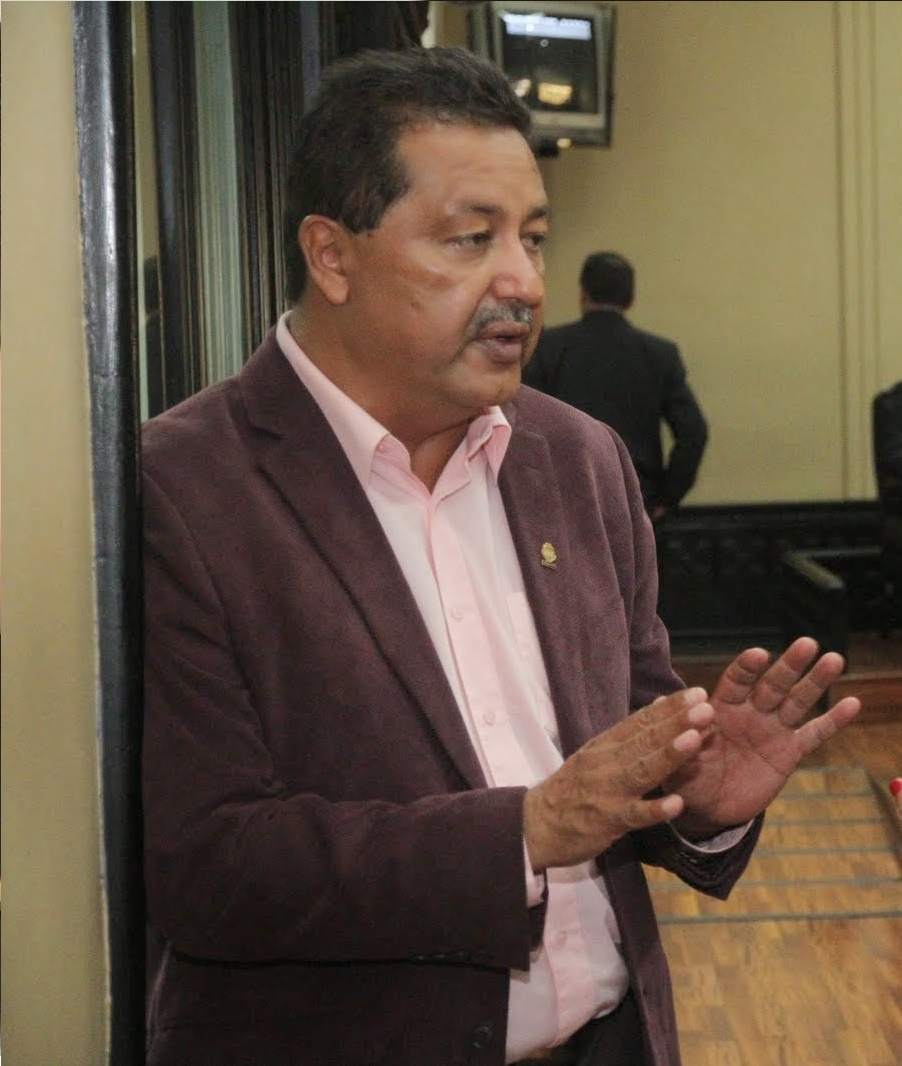

Deputy Legislative Assembly of Costa Rica
- In office 2014–2018
- Constituency: San José

Personal details
- Party: Independent (former Citizens' Action Party)
- Profession: Cooperative activist and politician

Víctor Hugo Morales Zapata is a Costa Rican politician. He was a member of the Citizens' Action Party (PAC for its Spanish initials) and the third deputy for San José for the 2014 to 2018 assembly. He resigned the party in 2017.

== Cooperative career ==
Morales was a student activist and member of the now defunct People's Revolutionary Youth Movement (Juventud del Movimiento Revolucionario del Pueblo). Morales did not finish university studies.

Morales was a director of Instituto Nacional de Fomento Cooperativo (The National Institute for Cooperativism) for twelve years and President for eight years. In his roles, he promoted agricultural cooperatives.

Morales was a vocal opponent of the Central American Free Trade Agreement, which he claims created many political enemies for him. Morales was involved in helping Luis Guillermo Solís become PAC's presidential candidate and was originally tapped by Solís as a political advisory.

== Internal problems with PAC ==
In 1994, Morales was found guilty of falsification of documents and embezzlement. The issue stemmed around payments for an airplane ticket to Spain. Morales disputes that he should pay interest on the ticket. In addition, Morales owes millions of colónes worth of debt to private and cooperative interests.

When the fact was revealed at a national assembly, several prominent PAC members asked Morales to step down as a deputy candidate, including founding member Ottón Solís and presidential candidate Luis Guillermo Solís. On 12 January 2014, PAC's Ethics Commission opened hearings on Morales. The issue caused a brief stir within the party, with Morales accusing Ottón Solís of having "elastic ethics." Ottón Solís threatened to leave the party should Morales remain; however, he eventually said he was satisfied with the Ethics Commission hearings. Through the matter, Morales claimed that Ottón Solís was persecuting him unjustly.

Because he was administratively and bureaucratically a member of PAC, he was still allowed to run under the party's banner and remain during national and local assemblies.

== Election as deputy ==
Morales could not be removed from the party in time for the elections, therefore he was elected as a deputy. There is still a possibility that Morales will not be seated with other PAC candidates in the assembly.
