= Distance State University =

Public research university in Costa Rica

- Universidad Estatal a Distancia
- Motto: El conocimiento al instante (Latin)
- Type: Public research university
- Established: 3 March 1977; 49 years ago
- Endowment: ₡56.189 million (2026) (Note: Endowment through the Special Fund for Higher Education (FEES), derived from Article 85 of the Constitution: "The Government must provide State Universities with their own assets and collaborate with their financing.")
- Budget: ₡67.372 million (2025)
- Rector: MBA. Rodrigo Arias Camacho
- Faculty: 954 (2013)
- Students: 41,068 (2025)
- Undergraduates: 40,552 (2025)
- Postgraduates: 516 (2025)
- Location: Mercedes, Montes de Oca, Costa Rica; 9.9407°N 84.0479°W
- Campus: Campus Fernando Volio Jiménez
- Newspaper: Acontecer
- Colours: Blue, white and yellow
- Website: uned.ac.cr

Main UNED campus in Montes de Oca

The Distance State University (Universidad Estatal a Distancia, UNED) is a public research university in Montes de Oca, Costa Rica. Founded in 1977, it was the first university in Costa Rica and Latin America to adopt distance learning as its principal educational modality. It remains the only public university in Costa Rica dedicated primarily to distance education.

On 3 March 1977, President Daniel Oduber Quirós signed Law No. 6044, the Law of Creation of the Distance State University. The law was published in La Gaceta No. 50 on 12 March 1977. The university's first rector was Francisco Antonio Pacheco Fernández.

UNED is one of Costa Rica's largest universities by student enrollment and has an extensive network of regional centers throughout the country. The university also operates its own publishing house (Editorial UNED), which produces textbooks and other educational materials for its academic programs, as well as scholarly and research publications.

The university offers undergraduate and graduate programs in a range of academic fields, including education, business administration, social sciences, humanities, agriculture, and natural resource management. Among its programs are a bachelor's degrees in Special Education, Educational Administration, Business Administration with various emphases,Criminological Sciences, Police Sciences, and programs in Agricultural Engineering and Protection and Management of Natural Resources. As of 2026, UNED offers 22 master's degree programs and four doctoral degree programs.

== UNED Research Journal ==
UNED Research Journal is the scientific research journal of the Distance State University of Costa Rica (UNED). It is a continuous online publication (ISSN 1659-441X), where articles are published as soon as they are edited, covering the period from January 1 to December 31 of each year.

Its objective is to publish internationally recognized academic research in all scientific fields. The journal is aimed at an academic audience. Currently, it publishes academic research conducted in Latin America, Asia, Africa, North America, and Europe.

This journal provides immediate, free, and open access to its content, under the principle that making research freely available to the public encourages a greater global exchange of knowledge. The journal charges no fees to authors or readers, and all its content is available under a CC BY 4.0 license.

It is indexed in Scielo, Latindex, and Redalyc. According to Latindex standards, the journal meets 37 out of 38 criteria for a high-level journal. The journal and its published articles can be found in the virtual libraries of OCLC and WorldCat, as well as Google Scholar and the Directory of Open Access Journals. Several catalogs worldwide include Cuadernos de Investigación UNED in their databases, such as the National Library of Australia, University of Brighton, Journal TOCs, and the National Scientific and Technical Research Council.
