= Danny Vargas Serrano =

Costa Rican politician

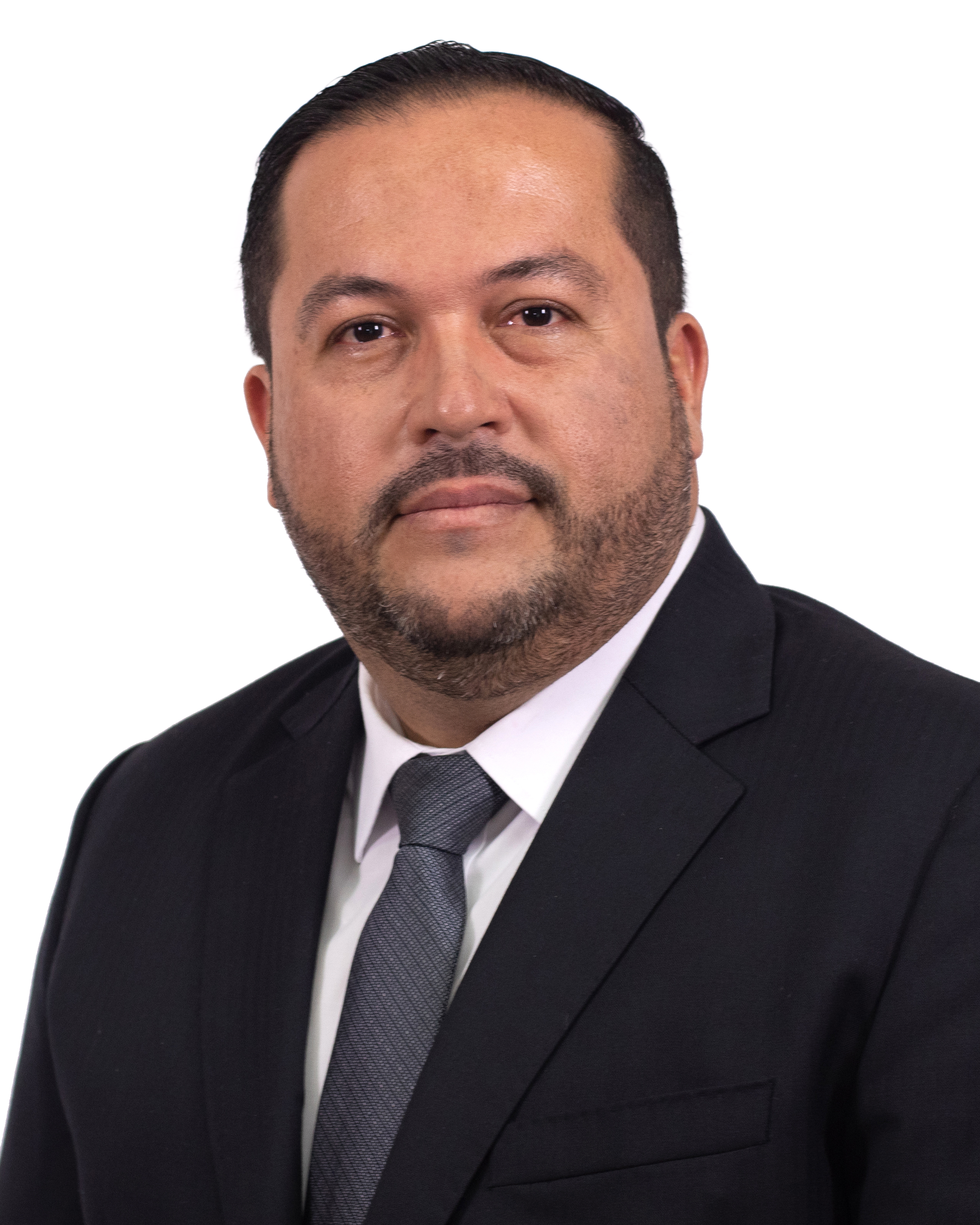
- Official portrait, 2022

Deputy of the Legislative Assembly of Costa Rica
- Constituency: San José

Personal details
- Born: Danny Vargas Serrano; July 8, 1979 (age 46) San José
- Party: National Liberation Party
- Profession: Lawyer

Danny Vargas Serrano (born 8 July 1979) is a Costa Rican politician serving in the Legislative Assembly of Costa Rica.

== Education ==
Serrano graduated from Escuela de Los Lagos de Heredia in 1991, and Colegio de Los Lagos de Heredia in 1996. He graduated from the University of Castile in 2018, the University of Costa Rica in 2011, and the University of San José in 2001.
