= Andrea Álvarez Marín =

Costa Rican politician (born 1986)

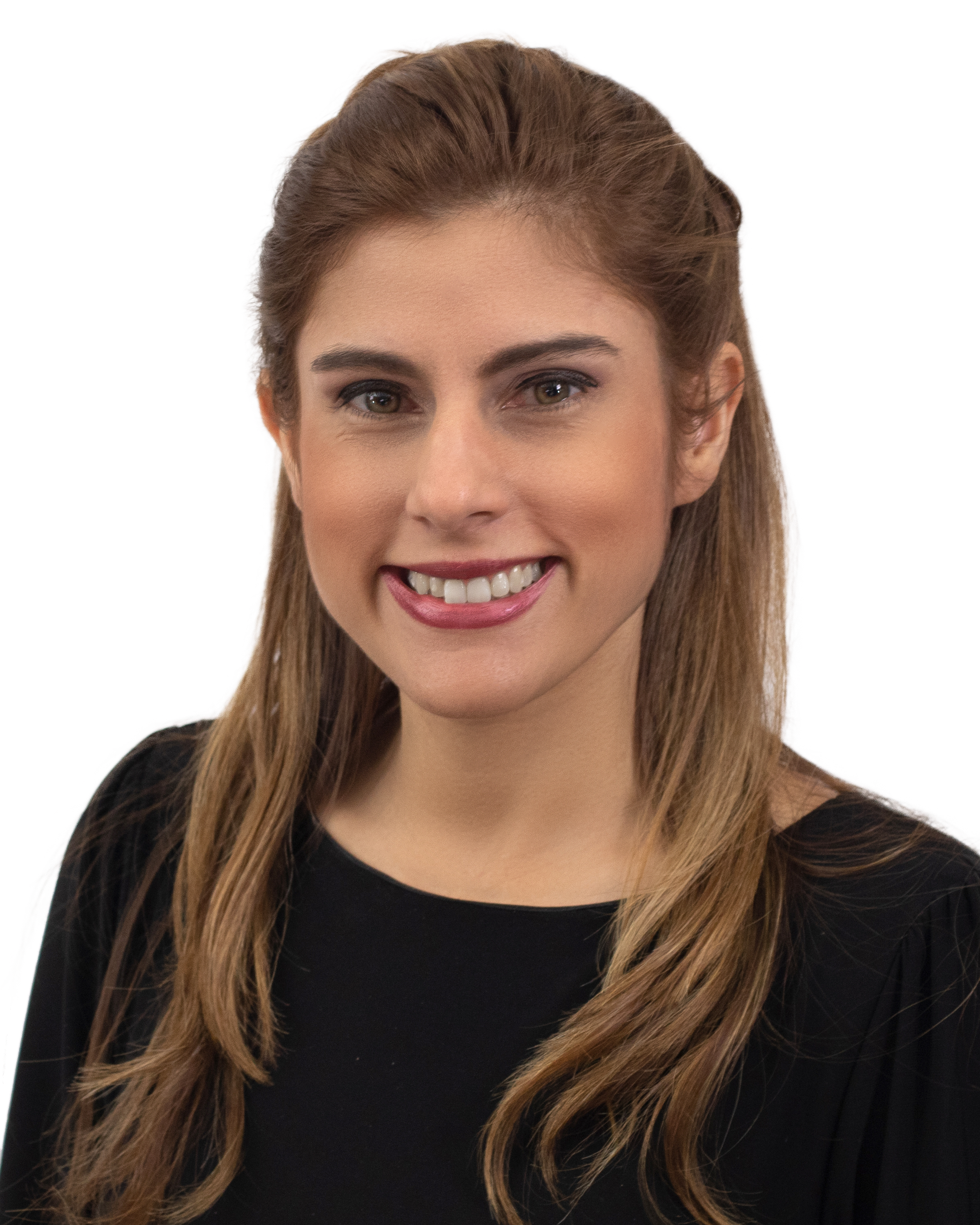
- Official portrait, 2022

Deputy of the Legislative Assembly of Costa Rica
- Constituency: San José

Personal details
- Born: Andrea Álvarez Marín; September 3, 1986 (age 39) San José, Costa Rica
- Party: National Liberation Party
- Profession: Historian
- Website: Website

Andrea Álvarez Marín (born 3 September 1986) is a Costa Rican politician serving in the Legislative Assembly of Costa Rica.

== Biography ==
Marín graduated from Anglo American School in 1998 and Saint Francis School in 2003. She went on to graduate from Harvard Kennedy School with a Master of Public Administration in 2021, Yale School of Public Health with a Master of Public Health in 2014, University of Costa Rica with a Bachelor's Degree in History in 2009.
