= New Republic Party (Costa Rica) =

Political party in Costa Rica

New Republic Party Partido Nueva República
- Abbreviation: PNR (Partido Nueva República)
- President: Fabricio Alvarado Muñoz
- Secretary-General: Mónica Catalán Marín
- Founder: Fabricio Alvarado Muñoz
- Founded: 20 October 2018; 8 years ago
- Split from: National Restoration Party
- Youth wing: Youth New Republic
- Ideology: Conservatism; Social conservatism Christian right
- Political position: Right-wing
- Colours: Blue; White
- Legislative Assembly: 0 / 57
- Alderpeople: 17 / 508
- Syndics: 1 / 486
- District councillors: 32 / 1,944
- Intendants: 1 / 8

Party flag

Website
- nuevarepublica.cr

The New Republic Party (Spanish: Partido Nueva República) is a Costa Rican conservative political party founded on 20 October 2018. The party was founded after the resignation of the evangelical singer and journalist Fabricio Alvarado Muñoz from the Christian party National Restoration for disagreements with the Executive Committee chaired by Congressman Carlos Avendaño. Alvarado was the latter's presidential candidate in the 2018 elections of major significance, since he was the most voted in the first round with 25% of the votes, qualifying for the run-off, but was defeated by the Citizen's Action Party nominee Carlos Alvarado Quesada.

After a series of disputes arising from irregular contracts made by the campaign team without permission from the Executive Committee and the apparent payment of the surveys published by the firm OPol Consultores, there were mutual accusations between Alvarado and Avendaño that led to the exit of the former and the foundation of his own party together with the majority of deputies elected by PRN.

The party finalized the recollection of signatures required by the Supreme Electoral Tribunal (at least 3000, although the group managed to collect 5000) and carried out the 82 cantonal assemblies that culminated in the founding National Assembly on 30 January 2019.

== Independent deputies bloc in the 2018-2022 legislative period ==
During the 2018-2022 legislative period, eight elected deputies, originally from the National Restoration Party, declared themselves independent and joined the New Republic Party, forming a self-styled bloc, however it is not an official fraction recognized by the Legislative Assembly, since they were not elected popularly in the 2018 elections as a party, and are therefore considered independent deputies not attached to any fraction.

These deputies are: Carmen Irene Chan Mora, Harllan Hoepelman Páez, Ignacio Alberto Alpízar Castro, Ivonne Acuña Cabrera, Jonathan Prendas Rodríguez, Marulin Raquel Azofeifa Trejos and Nidia Lorena Céspedes Cisneros.

Later, the deputy Floria Segreda Sagot, who was one of the eight to join the independent bloc, would change her decision and return to the National Restoration Party. In April 2020, the deputy Ivonne Acuña Cabrera, who had also joined the independent bloc, decided to separate from the bloc but she did not return to the National Restoration Party but continued as an independent deputy. As of October 2021, six deputies work together in this legislative bloc.

== 2020 municipal elections ==
Its first major nation-wide election was the 2020 Costa Rican municipal elections with disappointing results, as the party did not win any mayoralty and only managed to elect 29 aldermen.

== Electoral performance ==
=== Presidential ===
Election	Candidate	First round				Second round			
Election	Candidate	Votes	%	Position	Result	Votes	%	Position	Result
2022	Fabricio Alvarado Muñoz	311,633	14.88%	3rd	Lost	—N/a			
2026	Fabricio Alvarado Muñoz	56,159	2.19%	6th	Lost	—N/a			

=== Parliamentary ===
Election	Leader	Votes	%	Seats	+/–	Position	Government
2022	Fabricio Alvarado Muñoz	209,074	10.07%	7 / 57	New	4th	Opposition
2026	Fabricio Alvarado Muñoz	62,703	2.46%	0 / 57	▼7	6th	Extra-parliamentary
