= List of Costa Rican flags =

This is a list of flags used in Costa Rica. For more information about the national flag, visit the article Flag of Costa Rica.

== National flags ==
Flag	Date	Use	Description
	1998–	State flag and state ensign	The national flag with the national coat of arms inside a white oval in the red stripe towards the hoist.
	1848–	National flag and civil ensign	Five stripes – blue, white, red, white, and blue. The red central stripe with double the width of the blue and white stripes.

== Provinces ==
Flag	Administrative division	Adopted	Description
	Alajuela		White flag with the coat of arms of Alajuela Province in the center.
	Cartago		Horizontal bicolor of red and blue.
	Guanacaste		Horizontal tricolour of blue, white, and green, with a red pile at the hoist.
	Heredia		Vertical tricolour of yellow, white, and red, with the regional coat of arms in the central band.
	Limón		Horizontal tricolour of white, blue, and green.
	Puntarenas		Two triangles, red (upper hoist) and green (lower fly), separated by two diagonal stripes white (upper) and blue (lower). In the center, an eleven-pointed golden star with the date "1848" in black characters.
	San José		Red-bordered blue field with a five-pointed white star in the center.

== Cantons ==
Alvarado

Desamparados

Escazú

Puriscal

Aserrí

Mora

Goicoechea

Santa Ana

Alajuelita

Acosta

Orotina

Tibás

Guácimo

Matina

Moravia

Montes de Oca

Turrubares

Dota

Curridabat

Jiménez

Pérez Zeledón

Alajuela

Corredores

Quepos

San Ramón

Grecia

Hojancha

San Mateo

Atenas

Poás

Parrita

San Carlos

Zarcero

Sarchí

Guatuso

Upala

Los Chiles

Río Cuarto

Cartago

Paraíso

La Unión

Oreamuno

Turrialba

Heredia

Barva

Santo Domingo

Santa Bárbara

San Rafael

Belén

Flores

Sarapiquí

Liberia

Santa Cruz

Nicoya

Bagaces

Carrillo

Cañas

Abangares

Tilarán

Puntarenas

Esparza

Buenos Aires

Montes de Oro

Osa

Coto Brus

Garabito

Limón

Pococi

Siquirres

Palmares

San Jose

Talamanca

Vázquez de Coronado

== Historical flags ==
Flag	Date	Use	Description
	1541–1821	Burgundy Cross, flag of the Spanish Overseas Territories	A red saltire resembling two crossed, roughly-pruned (knotted) branches, on a white field.
	1638–1707	Flag of England	A white field with a red cross, also known as St George's Cross.
	1707–1787	Flag of the Kingdom of Great Britain	The first version of the Union Jack used in England from 1606 and Scotland from 1707—the flags of England and Scotland superimposed.
	1785–1821	War ensign of Spain	Three horizontal stripes—red, yellow, and red—with the coat of arms. The yellow stripe being twice as wide as each red stripe.
	1808–1813	Flag of Spain under Joseph Bonaparte (1808–1813).	A white banner with the royal coat of arms under Joseph Bonaparte.
	1819–1820	First flag of Great Colombia	A tricolour of yellow, blue, and red with the coat of arms.
	1820–1821	Second flag of Great Colombia	A tricolour of yellow, blue, and red with the coat of arms.
	1821	First flag of the First Mexican Empire	Three diagonal bands of white, green, and red with three golden stars.
	1821–1823	Second flag of the First Mexican Empire	Vertical tricolour of green, white, and red, with the imperial coat of arms in the center.
	1821–1831	Third flag of Great Colombia	Horizontal tricolour of yellow, blue, and red with the coat of arms in the center.
	1823	First Costa Rican national flag	Horizontal triband of blue, yellow, and blue.
	1823–1824	Second Costa Rican national flag	White field with a six-pointed red star.
	1823–1824	Flag of the United Provinces of Central America	Three horizontal stripes of light blue (upper and lower) and white (central), with the coat of arms in the center.
	1824	First flag of the State of Costa Rica (within the United Provinces of Central America)	Same as UPCA flag, with the State Seal in the lower stripe.
	1824–1849	Flag of the United Provinces of Central America	Three horizontal stripes of light blue (upper and lower) and white (central), with the coat of arms in the center.
	1824–1838	Second flag of the State of Costa Rica (within the United Provinces of Central America)	Same as UPCA flag, with the state seal in the lower stripe.
	1831–1834	Flag of the Republic of New Granada	A horizontal tricolour of yellow, blue, and red with the coat of arms in the center.
	1834–1856	Flag of the Granadine Confederation	A vertical tricolour of red, blue, and yellow.
	1838–1840	Second flag of the State of Costa Rica (within the United Provinces of Central America)	Horizontal triband of blue, white, and blue, with the state seal in the lower blue stripe.
	1840–1842		Horizontal triband of white, blue, and white, with the state seal in the central blue stripe.
	1842–1848	Third flag of the State of Costa Rica (within the United Provinces of Central America)	Horizontal tricolour of blue, white, and blue, with the state seal in the central white stripe.
	1848–1906	First flag after break of UPCA	The first appearance of the modern five stripe design, with the national coat of arms in the center.
	1906–1964	State flag from 1906 to 1964	In 1906 the style of the coat of arms was slightly modified, and the one used on the state flag was also modified, reduced in size and put into a white oval in the red stripe and offset towards the hoist.
	1964–1998	State flag from 1964 to 1998	In 1964 a law was passed by the government to increase the numbers of the stars from five to seven, to reflect the increase of number of its provinces. In 1998 a decree was passed by the government about the design of the national coat of arms, and according to the decree there should be some smoke ejecting from the three volcanoes as the current look.

== Flag proposals ==
Flag	Date	Use	Description
	1845		
	2022	A proposal sent to the San José municipal government	Map of the Pavas district, with a rainbow and the text: 'Liberty, peace and equity'.

== Political flags ==
Flag	Date	Party	Description
Current
	2021–present	A Just Costa Rica	
	2020–present	Social Democratic Progress Party	
	2019–present	New Republic Party	
	2018–present	United We Can	
	2016–present	Liberal Progressive Party	
	2014–present	Social Christian Republican Party	
	2014–present	Authentic Limonense Party	
	2012–present	New Homeland Party^{es}	
	2012–present	New Generation Party	
	2012–present	Workers' Party	
	2012–present	Christian Democratic Alliance	
	2009–present	Patriotic Alliance	
	2005–present	National Restoration Party	
	2004–present	Broad Front	
	2004–present	Accessibility without Exclusion	
	2004–present	Cartago Green Party	
	2002–present	National Rescue Party	
	2002–present	Escazu's Progressive Yoke	
	2000–present	Citizens' Action Party	
	1997–present	21st Century Curridabat	
	1997–present	Party of the Sun	
	1996–present	National Integration Party	
	1995–present	Costa Rican Renewal Party	
	1994–present	Libertarian Movement	
	1990–present	Agrarian Labour Action Party	
	1977–present	Social Christian Unity Party	
	1969–present	Cartago Agrarian Union Party	
	1951–present	National Liberation Party	
	2005–present	National Union Party	
	1948–1958	National Union Party	
	1943–present	People's Vanguard Party	
Former
	2006–2010	Union for Change Party	
	2005–2010	New Feminist League	
	2005–2006	United Left^{es}	
	2004–2010	Homeland First Party	
	1997–2003	New Democratic Party^{es}	
	1996–2010	Democratic Force	
	1989–2007	National Agrarian Party^{es}	
	1986	Alianza Popular Coalition^{es}	
	1998–?	Independent Party^{es}	
	1982–1998	Independent Party^{es}	
	1982–2006	Christian National Alliance^{es}	
	1981–?	National Movement^{es}	
	1978–2000s	United People	
	1978–?	Socialist Workers Organization^{es}	
	1976–1983	Unity Coalition	
	1973–2007	Independent Workers Party^{es}	
	1973–2007	Democratic Nationalist Alliance^{es}	
	1972–2007	National Patriotic Party^{es}	
	1972–1984	Democratic Renewal Party^{es}	
	1970s	National Front Party^{es}	
	1970–2007	Partido Unión Generaleña^{es}	
	1969–1978	Socialist Action Party^{es}	
	1967–1984	Christian Democratic Party^{es}	
	1966–1978	National Unification Party	
	1962–1966	National Unification Party	
	1960s	Popular Democratic Action	
	1957–1968	Revolutionary Civic Union	
	1952–2003	Democratic Party	
	1929–2002	Costa Rican Socialist Party^{es}	
	1901–1952	National Republican Party	

== Sources ==
- The Flags of Costa Rica. Flags of the World
- National symbols of Chile. Museums of Costa Rica (in Spanish)
