= Limón (Legislative Assembly constituency) =

Constituency in Costa Rica

- Constituency for the Legislative Assembly of Costa Rica
- Location of Limón within Costa Rica
- Province: Limón
- Population: 470,383 (2022)
- Electorate: 294,931 (2022)
- Area: 9,177 km^{2} (2024)

Current Constituency
- Created: 1949
- Seats: List: 5 (2002–present); 4 (1978–2002); 3 (1962–1978); 2 (1949–1962)
- Deputies: List: Rosalía Brown Young (PNR); María Marta Carballo Arce (PUSC); Katherine Andrea Moreira Brown (PLN); Yonder Andrey Salas Durán (PNR); Geison Enrique Valverde Méndez (PLN)

Limón is one of the seven multi-member constituencies of the Legislative Assembly, the national legislature of Costa Rica. The constituency was established in 1949 when the Legislative Assembly was established by the modified constitution imposed by the Figueres dictatorship. It is conterminous with the province of Limón. The constituency currently elects five of the 57 members of the Legislative Assembly using the closed party-list proportional representation electoral system. At the 2022 general election it had 294,931 registered electors.

== Electoral system ==
Limón currently elects five of the 57 members of the Legislative Assembly using the closed party-list proportional representation electoral system. Seats are allocated using the largest remainder method using the Hare quota (cociente). Only parties that receive at least 50% of the Hare quota (subcociente) compete for remainder seats. Any seats remaining unfilled after allocation using the quotient system are distributed amongst parties that surpassed the subcociente, is descending order of their total votes in the constituency. The latter process is repeated until all the seats in the constituency are filled.

== Election results ==
=== Summary ===
Election	United People PU / IU / CC2000 / PASO			Broad Front FA			Citizens' Action PAC			Authentic Limonense PAL			National Republican PRN / PR / PRI / PC			National Liberation PLN / PSD			Social Christian Unity PUSC / CU / PDC			National Unification PUN / PUN			National Integration PIN			Libertarian Movement PML			Social Democratic Progress PPSD			National Restoration PRN		
Election	Votes	%	Seats	Votes	%	Seats	Votes	%	Seats	Votes	%	Seats	Votes	%	Seats	Votes	%	Seats	Votes	%	Seats	Votes	%	Seats	Votes	%	Seats	Votes	%	Seats	Votes	%	Seats	Votes	%	Seats
2022	635	0.44%	0	7,705	5.28%	0	3,255	2.23%	0							29,179	20.01%	2	18,608	12.76%	1				3,940	2.70%	0	625	0.43%	0	11,957	8.20%	0	6,062	4.16%	0
2018				5,756	3.81%	0	10,314	6.83%	0	13,661	9.04%	0				22,520	14.91%	2	14,564	9.64%	0				9,954	6.59%	0	6,417	4.25%	0				35,164	23.28%	3
2014				22,509	15.92%	1	14,781	10.46%	0							36,718	25.98%	1	16,173	11.44%	1				535	0.38%	0	15,007	10.62%	1				4,557	3.22%	0
2010				9,616	7.31%	0	15,790	12.00%	1							43,889	33.34%	2	13,395	10.18%	1				1,145	0.87%	0	26,411	20.07%	1						
2006	1,046	1.00%	0				18,223	17.41%	1							38,669	36.95%	2	12,890	12.32%	1				861	0.82%	0	12,264	11.72%	1						
2002	1,962	2.02%	0				12,300	12.67%	1							25,442	26.21%	2	36,175	37.27%	2				735	0.76%	0	7,855	8.09%	0						
1998	2,503	2.88%	0							2,167	2.49%	0				21,142	24.30%	2	41,516	47.71%	2				966	1.11%	0	2,861	3.29%	0						
1994										5,468	5.79%	0				34,786	36.85%	1	35,064	37.14%	2															
1990	3,170	4.11%	0							4,901	6.36%	0				22,692	29.44%	2	38,655	50.14%	2															
1986	3,059	4.83%	0							3,813	6.02%	0				22,125	34.92%	2	28,240	44.57%	2															
1982	6,619	14.22%	1							3,893	8.37%	0				20,225	43.46%	2	12,568	27.01%	1															
1978	4,545	12.02%	0							2,954	7.82%	0				11,436	30.26%	2	14,610	38.65%	2	1,692	4.48%	0												
1974	4,291	13.94%	0										1,534	4.98%	0	11,368	36.93%	2	249	0.81%	0	10,043	32.62%	1												
1970	2,069	9.93%	0													9,199	44.17%	2	79	0.38%	0	8,605	41.32%	1												
1966																6,773	44.52%	2				6,748	44.35%	1												
1962													6,607	44.15%	1	6,773	45.26%	2				1,047	7.00%	0												
1958													2,082	25.52%	0	3,322	40.72%	1				2,144	26.28%	1												
1953																3,446	55.00%	1				895	14.28%	0												
1949															1			0						1												

=== Detailed ===
==== 2020s ====
===== 2022 =====
Results of the 2022 general election held on 6 February 2022:

Party		Votes per canton						Total votes	%	Seats
Party		Guá- cimo	Limón	Matina	Pococí	Siquir- res	Tala- manca	Total votes	%	Seats
National Liberation Party	PLN	2,644	6,549	2,167	10,851	5,249	1,719	29,179	20.01%	2
New Republic Party	PNR	2,658	5,544	2,206	7,460	3,640	1,671	23,179	15.90%	2
Social Christian Unity Party	PUSC	1,580	4,788	3,126	3,970	1,904	3,240	18,608	12.76%	1
Social Democratic Progress Party	PPSD	1,006	2,484	557	5,723	1,629	558	11,957	8.20%	0
Recovering Values Party	PAREVA	672	426	242	5,963	1,524	232	9,059	6.21%	0
Broad Front	FA	647	1,697	599	2,338	1,780	644	7,705	5.28%	0
Costa Rican Social Justice Party	JSC	2,238	2,227	281	812	472	164	6,194	4.25%	0
National Restoration Party	PRN	418	2,260	586	1,410	680	708	6,062	4.16%	0
National Integration Party	PIN	784	472	150	2,114	334	86	3,940	2.70%	0
A Just Costa Rica	CRJ	244	2,705	145	387	218	200	3,899	2.67%	0
Progressive Liberal Party	PLP	326	615	146	1,551	544	196	3,378	2.32%	0
New Generation Party	PNG	231	397	144	2,098	218	235	3,323	2.28%	0
Citizens' Action Party	PAC	564	374	145	1,607	406	159	3,255	2.23%	0
Social Christian Republican Party	PRSC	165	445	159	1,653	229	176	2,827	1.94%	0
Accessibility without Exclusion	PASE	539	362	126	608	315	38	1,988	1.36%	0
United We Can	UP	351	453	82	632	147	28	1,693	1.16%	0
Christian Democratic Alliance	ADC	69	886	61	331	103	169	1,619	1.11%	0
National Force Party	PFN	155	304	62	656	337	55	1,569	1.08%	0
Liberal Union Party	UL	89	287	95	517	166	69	1,223	0.84%	0
Our People Party	PNP	70	80	35	651	108	10	954	0.65%	0
Costa Rican Social; Democratic Movement	PMSDC	59	434	43	155	97	32	820	0.56%	0
Costa Rican Democratic Union	PUCD	36	285	33	101	47	153	655	0.45%	0
United People	PU	43	228	56	139	110	59	635	0.44%	0
Libertarian Movement	PML	69	135	43	258	91	29	625	0.43%	0
National Encounter Party	PEN	87	100	34	300	81	17	619	0.42%	0
Workers' Party	PT	43	85	15	250	60	21	474	0.33%	0
Costa Rican Left Party	PIC	29	43	21	151	72	35	351	0.24%	0
Valid votes		15,816	34,665	11,359	52,686	20,561	10,703	145,790	100.00%	5
Blank votes		196	483	177	529	323	183	1,891	1.26%	
Rejected votes – other		224	735	231	715	391	229	2,525	1.68%	
Total polled		16,236	35,883	11,767	53,930	21,275	11,115	150,206	50.93%	
Registered electors		31,690	73,121	24,028	99,046	42,665	24,381	294,931		
Turnout		51.23%	49.07%	48.97%	54.45%	49.87%	45.59%	50.93%		

The following candidates were elected: Rosalía Brown Young (PNR); María Marta Carballo Arce (PUSC); Katherine Andrea Moreira Brown (PLN); Yonder Andrey Salas Durán (PNR); and Geison Enrique Valverde Méndez (PLN).

==== 2010s ====
===== 2018 =====
Results of the 2018 general election held on 4 February 2018:

Party		Votes per canton						Total votes	%	Seats
Party		Guá- cimo	Limón	Matina	Pococí	Siquir- res	Tala- manca	Total votes	%	Seats
National Restoration Party	PRN	3,591	8,771	2,841	12,202	5,981	1,778	35,164	23.28%	3
National Liberation Party	PLN	2,715	3,516	1,787	9,185	3,989	1,328	22,520	14.91%	2
Social Christian Unity Party	PUSC	1,218	4,007	1,196	4,828	1,878	1,437	14,564	9.64%	0
Authentic Limonense Party	PAL	473	8,664	1,169	709	1,335	1,311	13,661	9.04%	0
Citizens' Action Party	PAC	1,210	1,770	458	4,926	1,328	622	10,314	6.83%	0
National Integration Party	PIN	1,022	2,063	492	4,794	1,226	357	9,954	6.59%	0
Christian Democratic Alliance	ADC	2,298	2,711	928	1,599	750	325	8,611	5.70%	0
Accessibility without Exclusion	PASE	1,046	498	619	3,536	666	61	6,426	4.25%	0
Libertarian Movement	PML	610	384	195	4,628	518	82	6,417	4.25%	0
Broad Front	FA	579	810	302	1,378	1,435	1,252	5,756	3.81%	0
Social Christian Republican Party	PRSC	389	1,497	431	1,188	692	1,262	5,459	3.61%	0
Costa Rican Renewal Party	PRC	532	490	374	2,068	1,629	157	5,250	3.48%	0
Recovering Values Party	PAREVA	694	359	608	2,465	624	90	4,840	3.20%	0
Workers' Party	PT	116	128	39	768	103	32	1,186	0.79%	0
New Generation Party	PNG	65	350	36	257	191	32	931	0.62%	0
Valid votes		16,558	36,018	11,475	54,531	22,345	10,126	151,053	100.00%	5
Blank votes		146	364	125	446	244	132	1,457	0.94%	
Rejected votes – other		320	854	288	864	465	259	3,050	1.96%	
Total polled		17,024	37,236	11,888	55,841	23,054	10,517	155,560	57.06%	
Registered electors		28,860	68,866	21,862	92,004	40,171	20,870	272,633		
Turnout		58.99%	54.07%	54.38%	60.69%	57.39%	50.39%	57.06%		

The following candidates were elected: Marulin Azofeifa Trejos (PRN); Eduardo Cruickshank Smith (PRN); Giovanni Alberto Gómez Obando (PRN); David Hubert Gourzong Cerdas (PLN); and Yorleny León Marchena (PLN).

===== 2014 =====
Results of the 2014 general election held on 2 February 2014:

Party		Votes per canton						Total votes	%	Seats
Party		Guá- cimo	Limón	Matina	Pococí	Siquir- res	Tala- manca	Total votes	%	Seats
National Liberation Party	PLN	3,235	9,956	2,630	12,265	6,557	2,075	36,718	25.98%	1
Broad Front	FA	2,274	5,305	1,488	8,281	3,602	1,559	22,509	15.92%	1
Costa Rican Renewal Party	PRC	2,231	3,202	2,467	6,519	2,404	1,031	17,854	12.63%	1
Social Christian Unity Party	PUSC	1,350	6,033	1,564	2,998	1,797	2,431	16,173	11.44%	1
Libertarian Movement	PML	1,590	3,928	1,535	5,327	1,782	845	15,007	10.62%	1
Citizens' Action Party	PAC	1,743	2,920	677	6,641	2,272	528	14,781	10.46%	0
Accessibility without Exclusion	PASE	653	960	272	2,408	718	115	5,126	3.63%	0
National Restoration Party	PRN	741	1,257	250	1,432	730	147	4,557	3.22%	0
National Advance	PAN	752	288	21	2,948	323	15	4,347	3.08%	0
New Homeland Party	PPN	139	333	59	518	157	64	1,270	0.90%	0
Workers' Party	PT	117	266	49	631	148	47	1,258	0.89%	0
New Generation Party	PNG	198	168	87	487	254	29	1,223	0.87%	0
National Integration Party	PIN	52	194	61	162	40	26	535	0.38%	0
Valid votes		15,075	34,810	11,160	50,617	20,784	8,912	141,358	100.00%	5
Blank votes		125	400	156	394	195	110	1,380	0.94%	
Rejected votes – other		442	1,049	387	1,256	536	268	3,938	2.68%	
Total polled		15,642	36,259	11,703	52,267	21,515	9,290	146,676	58.84%	
Registered electors		26,182	64,961	19,837	83,344	37,389	17,572	249,285		
Turnout		59.74%	55.82%	59.00%	62.71%	57.54%	52.87%	58.84%		

The following candidates were elected: Avelino Esquivel Quesada (PRC); Danny Hayling Carcache (PLN); Carmen Quesada Santamaría (PML); Gerardo Vargas Varela (FA); and Luis Alberto Vásquez Castro (PUSC).

===== 2010 =====
Results of the 2010 general election held on 7 February 2010:

Party		Votes per canton						Total votes	%	Seats
Party		Guá- cimo	Limón	Matina	Pococí	Siquir- res	Tala- manca	Total votes	%	Seats
National Liberation Party	PLN	4,663	12,484	2,704	14,665	6,744	2,629	43,889	33.34%	2
Libertarian Movement	PML	3,070	6,483	1,336	11,911	2,429	1,182	26,411	20.07%	1
Citizens' Action Party	PAC	1,899	4,324	1,012	5,337	1,602	1,616	15,790	12.00%	1
Social Christian Unity Party	PUSC	789	4,009	2,150	2,684	1,913	1,850	13,395	10.18%	1
Costa Rican Renewal Party	PRC	1,209	2,091	2,193	3,483	1,780	518	11,274	8.57%	0
Broad Front	FA	915	1,638	791	3,019	2,951	302	9,616	7.31%	0
Accessibility without Exclusion	PASE	760	1,759	320	3,157	1,221	118	7,335	5.57%	0
Patriotic Alliance	AP	113	303	298	446	430	49	1,639	1.25%	0
National Integration Party	PIN	65	684	50	203	97	46	1,145	0.87%	0
Workers' and Farmers' Movement	MTC	252	153	52	422	200	48	1,127	0.86%	0
Valid votes		13,735	33,928	10,906	45,327	19,367	8,358	131,621	100.00%	5
Blank votes		267	524	233	663	372	222	2,281	1.66%	
Rejected votes – other		457	896	419	1,139	569	318	3,798	2.76%	
Total polled		14,459	35,348	11,558	47,129	20,308	8,898	137,700	61.44%	
Registered electors		23,011	61,180	17,995	73,072	33,841	15,029	224,128		
Turnout		62.84%	57.78%	64.23%	64.50%	60.01%	59.21%	61.44%		

The following candidates were elected: Wálter Céspedes Salazar (PUSC); Carmen María Granados Fernández (PAC); Manuel Hernández Rivera (PML); Rodrigo Pinto Rawson (PLN); and Elibeth Venegas Villalobos (PLN).

==== 2000s ====
===== 2006 =====
Results of the 2006 general election held on 5 February 2006:

Party		Votes per canton						Total votes	%	Seats
Party		Guá- cimo	Limón	Matina	Pococí	Siquir- res	Tala- manca	Total votes	%	Seats
National Liberation Party	PLN	4,089	10,140	3,110	11,634	7,713	1,983	38,669	36.95%	2
Citizens' Action Party	PAC	1,840	5,077	885	7,016	2,576	829	18,223	17.41%	1
Social Christian Unity Party	PUSC	956	4,875	1,485	2,127	1,314	2,133	12,890	12.32%	1
Libertarian Movement	PML	1,327	2,791	901	5,765	1,335	145	12,264	11.72%	1
Costa Rican Renewal Party	PRC	535	1,317	1,361	2,683	1,089	560	7,545	7.21%	0
National Union Party	PUN	510	768	290	1,349	528	525	3,970	3.79%	0
Union for Change Party	PUPC	399	838	200	1,421	317	65	3,240	3.10%	0
Democratic Force	FD	88	274	184	914	134	38	1,632	1.56%	0
Workers' and Farmers' Movement	MTC	209	750	20	416	97	15	1,507	1.44%	0
Homeland First Party	PPP	147	332	109	546	227	53	1,414	1.35%	0
United Left	IU	143	92	65	435	199	112	1,046	1.00%	0
National Integration Party	PIN	51	468	52	149	86	55	861	0.82%	0
Patriotic Union	UP	125	199	166	108	82	44	724	0.69%	0
Democratic Nationalist Alliance	ADN	28	351	39	178	49	20	665	0.64%	0
Valid votes		10,447	28,272	8,867	34,741	15,746	6,577	104,650	100.00%	5
Blank votes		149	403	152	493	227	202	1,626	1.47%	
Rejected votes – other		412	1,000	403	1,223	548	376	3,962	3.59%	
Total polled		11,008	29,675	9,422	36,457	16,521	7,155	110,238	54.96%	
Registered electors		20,122	57,214	16,537	63,239	30,694	12,782	200,588		
Turnout		54.71%	51.87%	56.98%	57.65%	53.82%	55.98%	54.96%		

The following candidates were elected: Ovidio Agüero Acuña (PML); Yalile Esna Williams (PLN); Rafael Elías Madrigal Brenes (PAC); Jorge Luis Méndez Zamora (PLN); and José Luis Vásquez Mora (PUSC).

===== 2002 =====
Results of the 2002 general election held on 3 February 2002:

Party		Votes per canton						Total votes	%	Seats
Party		Guá- cimo	Limón	Matina	Pococí	Siquir- res	Tala- manca	Total votes	%	Seats
Social Christian Unity Party	PUSC	3,530	10,923	3,317	10,210	5,998	2,197	36,175	37.27%	2
National Liberation Party	PLN	2,769	7,537	2,157	7,211	3,959	1,809	25,442	26.21%	2
Citizens' Action Party	PAC	1,358	2,847	1,026	4,261	1,997	811	12,300	12.67%	1
Libertarian Movement	PML	588	3,302	640	2,151	993	181	7,855	8.09%	0
Costa Rican Renewal Party	PRC	647	767	720	2,278	555	447	5,414	5.58%	0
Democratic Force	FD	162	1,162	322	676	237	65	2,624	2.70%	0
National Agrarian Party	PAN	264	179	47	2,036	59	10	2,595	2.67%	0
Coalition Change 2000	CC2000	336	77	66	542	930	11	1,962	2.02%	0
National Christian Alliance	ANC	75	280	43	231	145	37	811	0.84%	0
National Integration Party	PIN	80	213	50	246	105	41	735	0.76%	0
National Rescue Party	PRN	20	226	35	122	46	11	460	0.47%	0
National Patriotic Party	PPN	39	54	49	139	45	12	338	0.35%	0
General Union Party	PUGEN	19	88	12	55	27	5	206	0.21%	0
Independent Workers' Party	PIO	12	35	12	46	36	8	149	0.15%	0
Valid votes		9,899	27,690	8,496	30,204	15,132	5,645	97,066	100.00%	5
Blank votes		262	565	194	585	341	201	2,148	2.10%	
Rejected votes – other		289	790	323	951	579	240	3,172	3.10%	
Total polled		10,450	29,045	9,013	31,740	16,052	6,086	102,386	58.39%	
Registered electors		17,500	51,434	14,820	54,344	26,450	10,791	175,339		
Turnout		59.71%	56.47%	60.82%	58.41%	60.69%	56.40%	58.39%		

The following candidates were elected: Carmen María Gamboa Herrera (PUSC); María Elena Núñez Chaves (PLN); Edwin Patterson (PAC); Marco Tulio Mora Rivera (PUSC); and Julián Watson Pomear (PLN).

==== 1990s ====
===== 1998 =====
Results of the 1998 general election held on 1 February 1998:

Party		Votes per canton						Total votes	%	Seats
Party		Guá- cimo	Limón	Matina	Pococí	Siquir- res	Tala- manca	Total votes	%	Seats
Social Christian Unity Party	PUSC	4,343	12,218	4,589	11,919	5,913	2,534	41,516	47.71%	2
National Liberation Party	PLN	2,414	6,325	1,705	6,208	3,589	901	21,142	24.30%	2
National Agrarian Party	PAN	551	750	875	4,130	684	507	7,497	8.62%	0
Libertarian Movement	PML	225	987	58	1,030	528	33	2,861	3.29%	0
United People	PU	314	299	238	815	783	54	2,503	2.88%	0
Democratic Force	FD	248	683	132	796	443	50	2,352	2.70%	0
Authentic Limonense Party	PAL	66	1,773	94	71	123	40	2,167	2.49%	0
Costa Rican Renewal Party	PRC	183	700	91	437	168	586	2,165	2.49%	0
National Integration Party	PIN	113	312	86	274	147	34	966	1.11%	0
New Democratic Party	NPD	10	338	45	60	206	25	684	0.79%	0
National Independent Party	PNI	43	175	20	296	114	35	683	0.78%	0
National Christian Alliance	ANC	128	157	24	112	220	19	660	0.76%	0
Democratic Party	PD	58	285	18	155	53	76	645	0.74%	0
Independent Party	PI	18	34	16	34	444	6	552	0.63%	0
General Union Party	PUGEN	13	358	15	48	38	14	486	0.56%	0
National Rescue Party	PRN	9	55	9	43	22	5	143	0.16%	0
Valid votes		8,736	25,449	8,015	26,428	13,475	4,919	87,022	100.00%	4
Blank votes		154	440	131	456	210	157	1,548	1.68%	
Rejected votes – other		326	848	369	1,088	656	381	3,668	3.98%	
Total polled		9,216	26,737	8,515	27,972	14,341	5,457	92,238	60.04%	
Registered electors		15,019	46,284	13,315	45,966	23,394	9,646	153,624		
Turnout		61.36%	57.77%	63.95%	60.85%	61.30%	56.57%	60.04%		

The following candidates were elected: Virginia Consuelo Aguiluz Barboza (PLN); Wálter Céspedes Salazar (PUSC); Elberth Gómez Céspedes (PUSC); and Walter Antonio Robinson Davis (PLN).

===== 1994 =====
Results of the 1994 general election held on 6 February 1994:

Party		Votes per canton						Total votes	%	Seats
Party		Guá- cimo	Limón	Matina	Pococí	Siquir- res	Tala- manca	Total votes	%	Seats
Social Christian Unity Party	PUSC	3,144	11,451	3,776	8,818	5,388	2,487	35,064	37.14%	2
National Liberation Party	PLN	3,947	9,920	3,131	9,415	6,212	2,161	34,786	36.85%	1
National Agrarian Party	PAN	1,683	1,791	777	7,558	1,479	301	13,589	14.39%	1
Authentic Limonense Party	PAL	154	4,112	239	291	428	244	5,468	5.79%	0
People's Vanguard Party	PVP	127	518	268	519	855	85	2,372	2.51%	0
National Christian Alliance	ANC	112	343	100	327	248	78	1,208	1.28%	0
Democratic Force	FD	82	293	76	297	121	35	904	0.96%	0
General Union Party	PUGEN	31	189	13	121	67	16	437	0.46%	0
National Independent Party	PNI	25	128	85	60	30	10	338	0.36%	0
Independent Party	PI	20	74	29	73	23	25	244	0.26%	0
Valid votes		9,325	28,819	8,494	27,479	14,851	5,442	94,410	100.00%	4
Blank votes		136	446	184	439	207	174	1,586	1.57%	
Rejected votes – other		506	1,185	436	1,664	926	330	5,047	4.99%	
Total polled		9,967	30,450	9,114	29,582	15,984	5,946	101,043	73.40%	
Registered electors		12,975	43,903	11,974	38,781	21,187	8,847	137,667		
Turnout		76.82%	69.36%	76.11%	76.28%	75.44%	67.21%	73.40%		

The following candidates were elected: Teddy Cole Scarlett (PUSC); Carlos Manuel Femández Alvarado (PUSC); Víctor Hugo Núñez Torres (PAN); and Luis Velásquez Acuña (PLN).

===== 1990 =====
Results of the 1990 general election held on 4 February 1990:

Party		Votes per canton						Total votes	%	Seats
Party		Guá- cimo	Limón	Matina	Pococí	Siquir- res	Tala- manca	Total votes	%	Seats
Social Christian Unity Party	PUSC	3,470	13,108	3,374	10,310	5,939	2,454	38,655	50.14%	2
National Liberation Party	PLN	2,408	6,819	1,816	6,187	3,950	1,512	22,692	29.44%	2
Authentic Limonense Party	PAL	346	3,768	207	81	352	147	4,901	6.36%	0
National Agrarian Party	PAN	565	129	279	3,214	384	23	4,594	5.96%	0
United People	PU	175	903	232	932	754	174	3,170	4.11%	0
National Christian Alliance	ANC	225	392	81	653	271	57	1,679	2.18%	0
General Union Party	PUGEN	23	275	21	82	53	24	478	0.62%	0
Party of Progress	PdP	14	340	11	16	15	13	409	0.53%	0
National Independent Party	PNI	26	181	24	97	45	19	392	0.51%	0
Independent Party	PI	8	35	8	37	22	8	118	0.15%	0
Valid votes		7,260	25,950	6,053	21,609	11,785	4,431	77,088	100.00%	4
Blank votes		133	356	138	438	176	123	1,364	1.65%	
Rejected votes – other		384	1,193	350	1,254	575	216	3,972	4.82%	
Total polled		7,777	27,499	6,541	23,301	12,536	4,770	82,424	71.97%	
Registered electors		10,477	39,009	8,933	31,219	17,544	7,342	114,524		
Turnout		74.23%	70.49%	73.22%	74.64%	71.45%	64.97%	71.97%		

The following candidates were elected: Omar Corella lzquierdo (PUSC); Reynaldo Adolfo Maxwell Kennedy (PLN); Carlos Manuel Rojas López (PLN); and Luis Villalobos Villalobos (PUSC).

==== 1980s ====
===== 1986 =====
Results of the 1986 general election held on 2 February 1986:

Party		Votes per canton						Total votes	%	Seats
Party		Guá- cimo	Limón	Matina	Pococí	Siquir- res	Tala- manca	Total votes	%	Seats
Social Christian Unity Party	PUSC	2,637	9,695	2,549	7,144	4,622	1,593	28,240	44.57%	2
National Liberation Party	PLN	2,582	6,504	1,762	6,427	3,779	1,071	22,125	34.92%	2
Authentic Limonense Party	PAL	77	2,867	296	79	344	150	3,813	6.02%	0
People's Alliance Coalition	CAP	354	500	227	1,921	383	120	3,505	5.53%	0
United People	PU	115	1,527	136	689	517	75	3,059	4.83%	0
National Christian Alliance	ANC	110	311	75	340	182	36	1,054	1.66%	0
National Republican Party	PNR	57	443	73	135	104	52	864	1.36%	0
General Union Party	PUGEN	2	523	11	24	11	14	585	0.92%	0
Independent Party	PI	9	53	9	24	19	3	117	0.18%	0
Valid votes		5,943	22,423	5,138	16,783	9,961	3,114	63,362	100.00%	4
Blank votes		90	332	96	333	137	85	1,073	1.58%	
Rejected votes – other		296	1,403	329	894	534	228	3,684	5.41%	
Total polled		6,329	24,158	5,563	18,010	10,632	3,427	68,119	72.10%	
Registered electors		8,527	33,737	7,596	24,575	14,646	5,398	94,479		
Turnout		74.22%	71.61%	73.24%	73.29%	72.59%	63.49%	72.10%		

The following candidates were elected: Orlando Avendaño Castro (PLN); Héctor Carballo Chaves (PUSC); Clinton Cruickshank Smith (PLN); and Marcelle Taylor Brown (PUSC).

===== 1982 =====
Results of the 1982 general election held on 7 February 1982:

Party		Votes per canton						Total votes	%	Seats
Party		Guá- cimo	Limón	Matina	Pococí	Siquir- res	Tala- manca	Total votes	%	Seats
National Liberation Party	PLN	2,072	6,823	1,998	5,066	3,243	1,023	20,225	43.46%	2
Unity Coalition	CU	986	4,927	1,107	3,040	1,887	621	12,568	27.01%	1
United People	PU	642	2,072	612	1,990	1,098	205	6,619	14.22%	1
Authentic Limonense Party	PAL	197	2,713	105	208	512	158	3,893	8.37%	0
National Movement	MN	184	505	65	520	133	126	1,533	3.29%	0
National Democratic Party	PND	25	435	52	214	67	61	854	1.84%	0
Independent Party	PI	39	290	70	121	106	31	657	1.41%	0
Democratic Party	PD	18	65	17	42	27	14	183	0.39%	0
Valid votes		4,163	17,830	4,026	11,201	7,073	2,239	46,532	100.00%	4
Blank votes		71	307	71	237	107	70	863	1.73%	
Rejected votes – other		205	963	215	542	371	126	2,422	4.86%	
Total polled		4,439	19,100	4,312	11,980	7,551	2,435	49,817	67.60%	
Registered electors		6,471	27,878	6,360	18,261	10,936	3,786	73,692		
Turnout		68.60%	68.51%	67.80%	65.60%	69.05%	64.32%	67.60%		

The following candidates were elected: Thelma Curling Rodríguez (PLN); Freddy Menéndez Chaves (PU); Luis Villalobos Villalobos (CU); and Herman Weinstok Wolfowicz (PLN).

==== 1970s ====
===== 1978 =====
Results of the 1978 general election held on 5 February 1978:

Party		Votes per canton						Total votes	%	Seats
Party		Guá- cimo	Limón	Matina	Pococí	Siquir- res	Tala- manca	Total votes	%	Seats
Unity Coalition	CU	1,375	5,465	1,170	4,279	1,755	566	14,610	38.65%	2
National Liberation Party	PLN	1,414	3,637	1,087	2,901	1,835	562	11,436	30.26%	2
United People	PU	426	1,464	451	1,307	850	47	4,545	12.02%	0
Authentic Limonense Party	PAL	46	2,432	112	63	235	66	2,954	7.82%	0
National Unification Party	PUN	125	521	229	191	400	226	1,692	4.48%	0
National Independent Party	PNI	99	904	83	79	40	23	1,228	3.25%	0
Republican Union Party	PUR	86	319	52	92	211	31	791	2.09%	0
Independent Party	PI	18	211	22	49	33	8	341	0.90%	0
Democratic Party	PD	15	77	23	46	28	12	201	0.53%	0
Valid votes		3,604	15,030	3,229	9,007	5,387	1,541	37,798	100.00%	4
Blank votes		89	202	72	244	116	46	769	1.89%	
Rejected votes – other		245	879	193	499	304	101	2,221	5.45%	
Total polled		3,938	16,111	3,494	9,750	5,807	1,688	40,788	69.79%	
Registered electors		5,565	22,957	4,869	14,282	8,240	2,529	58,442		
Turnout		70.76%	70.18%	71.76%	68.27%	70.47%	66.75%	69.79%		

The following candidates were elected: Juan Rafael Barrientos Germe (PLN); Héctor Carballo Chaves (CU); Reinaldo Jiménez Gamboa (PLN); and Arturo Zúñiga Ross (CU).

===== 1974 =====
Results of the 1974 general election held on 3 February 1974:

Party		Votes per canton						Total votes	%	Seats
Party		Guá- cimo	Limón	Matina	Pococí	Siquir- res	Tala- manca	Total votes	%	Seats
National Liberation Party	PLN	1,160	4,968	904	2,199	1,636	501	11,368	36.93%	2
National Unification Party	PUN	962	3,594	843	2,380	1,491	773	10,043	32.62%	1
Socialist Action Party	PASO	374	2,354	350	566	625	22	4,291	13.94%	0
National Independent Party	PNI	149	1,052	187	393	355	36	2,172	7.06%	0
National Republican Party	PRN	243	363	354	311	230	33	1,534	4.98%	0
Democratic Renewal Party	PRD	43	282	78	140	128	35	706	2.29%	0
Democratic Party	PD	23	188	13	35	17	2	278	0.90%	0
Christian Democratic Party	PDC	72	118	9	22	16	12	249	0.81%	0
Independent Party	PI	10	65	23	20	18	7	143	0.46%	0
Valid votes		3,036	12,984	2,761	6,066	4,516	1,421	30,784	100.00%	3
Blank votes		75	181	57	195	71	67	646	1.97%	
Rejected votes – other		185	487	144	299	220	79	1,414	4.31%	
Total polled		3,296	13,652	2,962	6,560	4,807	1,567	32,844	69.69%	
Registered electors		4,683	19,390	4,103	9,986	6,839	2,128	47,129		
Turnout		70.38%	70.41%	72.19%	65.69%	70.29%	73.64%	69.69%		

The following candidates were elected: Domingo Argüello Noguera (PLN); Guillermo Hernández Cordero (PUN); and Dion Daniel Jackson Freeman (PLN).

===== 1970 =====
Results of the 1970 general election held on 1 February 1970:

Party		Votes per canton			Total votes	%	Seats
Party		Limón	Pococí	Siquir- res	Total votes	%	Seats
National Liberation Party	PLN	5,597	2,182	1,420	9,199	44.17%	2
National Unification Party	PUN	4,576	2,435	1,594	8,605	41.32%	1
Socialist Action Party	PASO	1,508	378	183	2,069	9.93%	0
National Front Party	PFN	529	86	44	659	3.16%	0
National Union Party	PUN	108	25	16	149	0.72%	0
Christian Democratic Party	PDC	52	19	8	79	0.38%	0
Costa Rican Renewal Movement	MRC	40	16	10	66	0.32%	0
Valid votes		12,410	5,141	3,275	20,826	100.00%	3
Blank votes		246	185	59	490	2.15%	
Rejected votes – other		932	346	223	1,501	6.58%	
Total polled		13,588	5,672	3,557	22,817	71.57%	
Registered electors		18,870	8,186	4,823	31,879		
Turnout		72.01%	69.29%	73.75%	71.57%		

The following candidates were elected: Asis Esna Miguel (PLN); Reynaldo Adolfo Maxwell Kennedy (PLN); and Rogelio Pardo Jochs (PUN).

==== 1960s ====
===== 1966 =====
Results of the 1966 general election held on 6 February 1966:

Party		Votes per canton			Total votes	%	Seats
Party		Limón	Pococí	Siquir- res	Total votes	%	Seats
National Liberation Party	PLN	4,430	1,416	927	6,773	44.52%	2
National Unification Party	PUN	3,828	1,699	1,221	6,748	44.35%	1
Revolutionary Civic Union	UCR	1,003	44	133	1,180	7.76%	0
Democratic Party	PD	245	195	73	513	3.37%	0
Valid votes		9,506	3,354	2,354	15,214	100.00%	3
Blank votes		176	64	48	288	1.70%	
Rejected votes – other		922	283	264	1,469	8.66%	
Total polled		10,604	3,701	2,666	16,971	70.65%	
Registered electors		15,060	5,204	3,757	24,021		
Turnout		70.41%	71.12%	70.96%	70.65%		

The following candidates were elected: Guillermo Alfaro Quirós (PUN); Hernán Garrón Salazar (PLN); and Carl Eduardo Neil Neil (PLN).

===== 1962 =====
Results of the 1962 general election held on 4 February 1962:

Party		Votes per canton			Total votes	%	Seats
Party		Limón	Pococí	Siquir- res	Total votes	%	Seats
National Liberation Party	PLN	4,465	1,365	943	6,773	45.26%	2
Republican Party	PR	4,031	1,362	1,214	6,607	44.15%	1
National Union Party	PUN	411	504	132	1,047	7.00%	0
Popular Democratic Action	PADP	314	49	51	414	2.77%	0
National Renewal Party	RN	58	53	14	125	0.84%	0
Valid votes		9,279	3,333	2,354	14,966	100.00%	3
Blank votes		142	67	35	244	1.58%	
Rejected votes – other		148	89	41	278	1.79%	
Total polled		9,569	3,489	2,430	15,488	74.53%	
Registered electors		12,830	4,724	3,227	20,781		
Turnout		74.58%	73.86%	75.30%	74.53%		

The following candidates were elected: Demóstenes Bermúdez Coward (PLN); Horacio Tasies Piñeiro (PR); and Hernán Víquez Barrantes (PLN).

==== 1950s ====
===== 1958 =====
Results of the 1958 general election held on 2 February 1958:

Party		Votes per canton			Total votes	%	Seats
Party		Limón	Pococí	Siquir- res	Total votes	%	Seats
National Liberation Party	PLN	2,393	529	400	3,322	40.72%	1
National Union Party	PUN	1,012	778	354	2,144	26.28%	1
National Republican Party	PRN	1,387	420	275	2,082	25.52%	0
Independent Party	PI	241	77	120	438	5.37%	0
Revolutionary Civic Union	UCR	47	17	22	86	1.05%	0
Democratic Opposition Movement	MDO	37	3	15	55	0.67%	0
Democratic Party	PD	8	16	8	32	0.39%	0
Valid votes		5,125	1,840	1,194	8,159	100.00%	2
Blank votes		57	49	42	148	1.64%	
Rejected votes – other		399	183	153	735	8.13%	
Total polled		5,581	2,072	1,389	9,042	61.53%	
Registered electors		8,594	3,662	2,439	14,695		
Turnout		64.94%	56.58%	56.95%	61.53%		

The following candidates were elected: Hernán Caamaño Cubero (PUN); and Hernán Garrón Salazar (PLN).

===== 1953 =====
Results of the 1953 general election held on 26 July 1953:

Party		Votes per canton			Total votes	%	Seats
Party		Limón	Pococí	Siquir- res	Total votes	%	Seats
National Liberation Party	PLN	2,247	816	383	3,446	55.00%	1
Democratic Party	PD	1,368	264	293	1,925	30.72%	1
National Union Party	PUN	288	442	165	895	14.28%	0
Valid votes		3,903	1,522	841	6,266	100.00%	2
Blank votes		98	95	47	240	3.37%	
Rejected votes – other		344	143	125	612	8.60%	
Total polled		4,345	1,760	1,013	7,118	63.07%	
Registered electors		6,430	3,027	1,829	11,286		
Turnout		67.57%	58.14%	55.39%	63.07%		

The following candidates were elected: William Reuben Aguilera (PLN); and Mariano Zúñiga Odio (PD).

==== 1940s ====
===== 1949 =====
The following candidates were elected at the 1949 general election held on 4 October 1949: Carmelo Calvosa Chacón (PC); and Carlos Silva Quirós (PUN).
