= 2006 Costa Rican municipal elections =

- 3 December 2006

81 mayors, 469 syndics, 1844 district councillors, 8 intendants, 32 municipal district councillors and their alternates
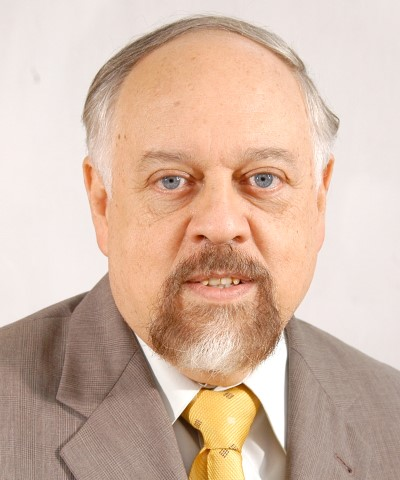

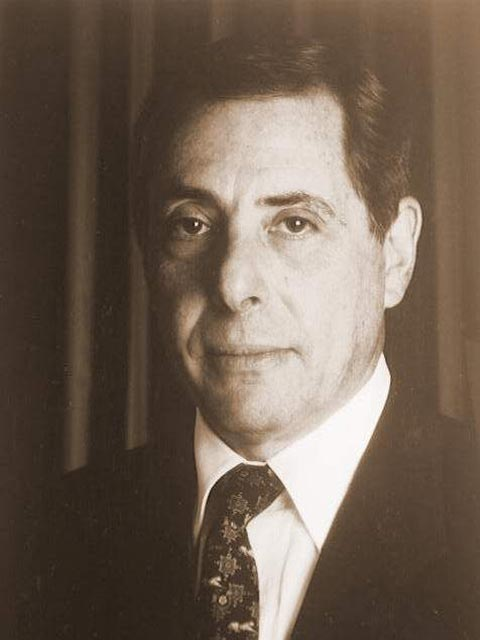

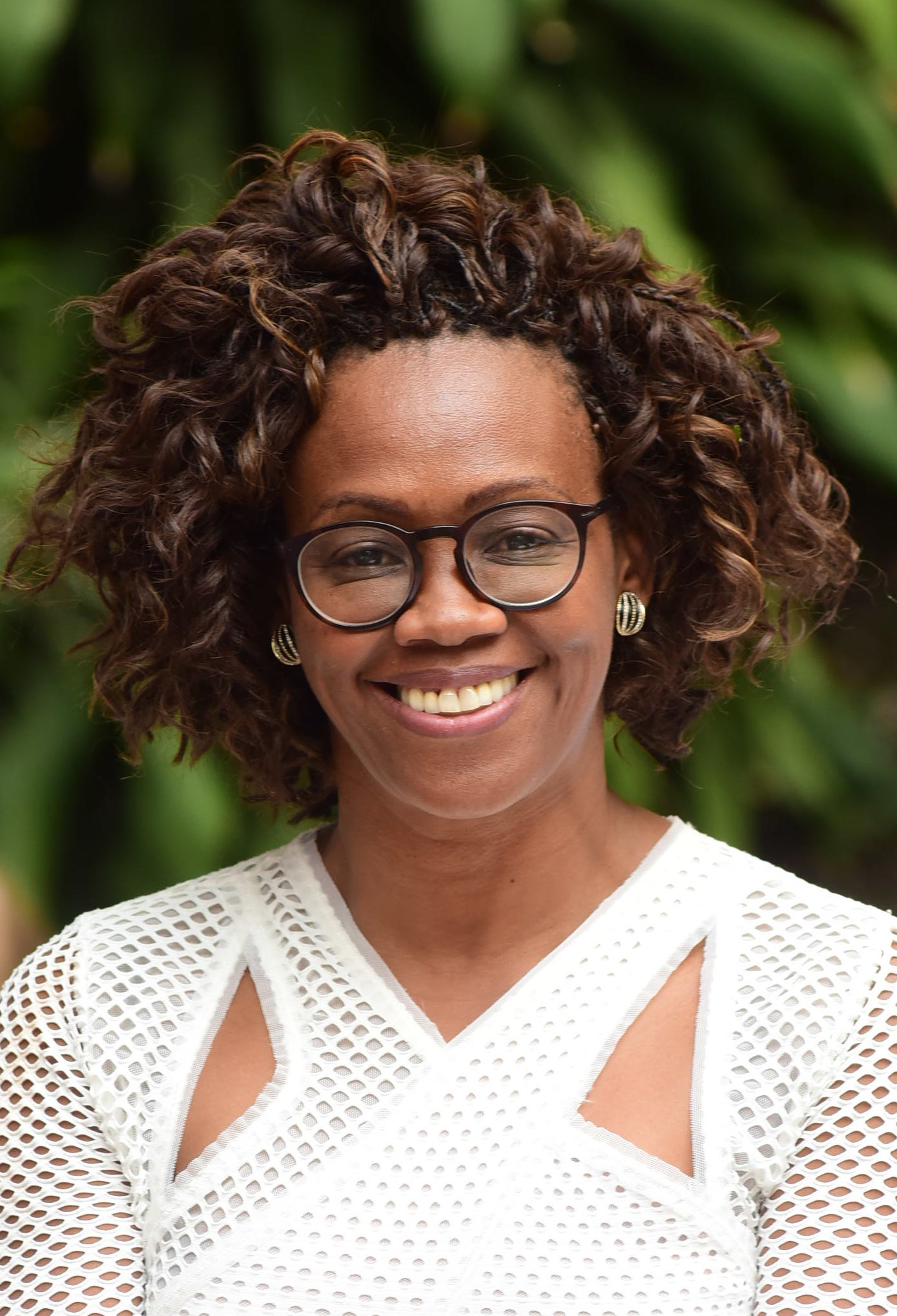

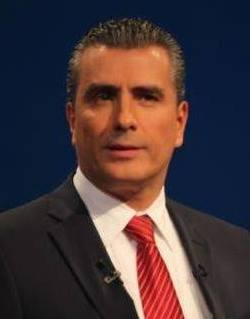
	First party	Second party
Leader	Francisco Antonio Pacheco Fernández	Luis Fishman Zonzinski
Party	PLN	PUSC
Mayors	59	12
Mayors +/–	▲11	▼3
	Third party	Fourth party
Leader	Epsy Campbell Barr	Otto Guevara Guth
Party	PAC	PML
Mayors	5	1
Mayors +/–	▲4	▲1

The 2006 Costa Rica local elections were held on December 3, 2006. In the February 2006 general elections, Costa Rica elected president, vice-presidents, deputies of the Legislative Assembly and municipal councilors in the general elections. The December 2006 elections were held to elect cantonal mayors, members of the District Councils of each of the nation’s districts and intendants of eight special autonomous districts and islands.

The ruling National Liberation Party won most of the seats and mayors with 59 as the seven provincial capitals. The main opposition party, Citizens' Action Party, was unsuccessful in keep the support it had in the presidential election. In the February 2006 elections, this party had almost tied the PLN. The Social Christian Unity Party become the second largest force at municipal level. Libertarian Movement achieved it first ever municipal government. Additionally, three local parties were successful in Curridabat, Aguirre and Siquirres.

== Results ==
=== Mayors ===
List of elected mayors by canton
Cantons	Population	Incumbent mayor	Party	Elected mayor	Party
San José	309,672	Johnny Araya	PLN	Johnny Araya	PLN
Escazú	52,372	Marco Antonio Segura	PLN	Marco Antonio Segura	PLN
Desamparados	193,478	Carlos Alberto Padilla	PLN	Maureen Fallas	PLN
Puriscal	29,407	Carlos Araya	PUSC	Jorge Luis Chaves	PLN
Tarrazú	14,160	José Rodolfo Naranjo	PUSC	Iván Suárez	PLN
Aserrí	57,892	Mario Morales	PLN	Mario Morales	PLN
Mora	21,666	Alcides Ovidio Araya	PLN	Gilberto Monge	PLN
Goicoechea	117,532	Carlos Luis Murillo	PUSC	Óscar Enrique Figueroa	PLN
Santa Ana	48,879	Ronald Octavio Traña	PUSC	Gerardo Oviedo	PLN
Alajuelita	70,297	Víctor Hugo Echavarría	PUSC	Tomás Poblador	PLN
Vázquez de Coronado	55,585	Rolando Méndez	PUSC	Leonardo Herrera	PLN
Acosta	18,661	Ronald Ricardo Durán	PLN	Ronald Ricardo Durán	PLN
Tibás	72,074	Percy Kenneth Rodríguez	PUSC	Jorge Antonio Salas	PAC
Moravia	50,419	Alejandro Hidalgo	PLN	Edgar Vargas	PAC
Montes de Oca	50,433	Sonia María Montero	PAC	Fernando Trejos	UpC
Turrubares	4,877	Roberto González	PUSC	Rafael Vindas	PUSC
Dota	6,519	Mario Enrique Umaña	PLN	José Valverde	PLN
Curridabat	60,889	Luz de los Ángeles Retana	CSXXI	Edgar Eduardo Mora	CSXXI
Pérez Zeledón	122,187	Rosibel Ramos	PUSC	Rosibel Ramos	PUSC
León Cortés	11,696	Sergio Picado	PUSC	Leonardo Quesada	PLN
Alajuela	222,853	Fabio Molina	PLN	Joyce Mary Zurcher	PLN
San Ramón	67,975	Osvaldo Vargas	PUSC	Raúl Antonio Gómez	PLN
Grecia	65,119	Freddy Barrantes	PUSC	Giovanny Arguedas	PLN
San Mateo	5,343	Erwen Yanan Masís	PUSC	Erwen Yanan Masís	PUSC
Atenas	22,479	Wilberth Martín Aguilar	PUSC	Wilberth Martín Aguilar	PUSC
Naranjo	37,602	Mario Bolívar Solís	PLN	Eugenio Padilla	PLN
Palmares	29,766	Mario Alberto Rojas	PUSC	Luis Carlos Castillo	PLN
Poás	24,764	Carlos Eduardo Soto	PUSC	José Joaquín Brenes	PLN
Orotina	15,705	José Joaquín Peraza	PUSC	Emilio Jesús Rodríguez	PLN
San Carlos	127,140	Alfredo Córdoba	PLN	Alfredo Córdoba	PLN
Alfaro Ruiz	10,845	Manuel Enrique Durán	PUSC	Marco Vinicio Rodríguez	PLN
Valverde Vega	16,239	Víctor Manuel Rojas	PUSC	Víctor Manuel Rojas	PUSC
Upala	37,679	Juan Bosco Acevedo	PLN	Juan Bosco Acevedo	PLN
Los Chiles	19,732	Santiago Millón	PLN	Santiago Millón	PLN
Guatuso	13,045	Carlos Luis Corrales	PUSC	Fidel Condega	PLN
Cartago	132,057	Harold Humberto Góngora	PUSC	Rolando Alberto Rodríguez	PLN
Paraíso	52,393	Marvin Solano	PAPAR	Marvin Solano	ML
La Unión	80,279	Guillermo Arturo Zúñiga	PIO	Julio Antonio Rojas	PLN
Jiménez	14,046	Jorge Humberto Solano	PLN	Jorge Humberto Solano	PLN
Turrialba	68,510	Marvin Gerardo Orocú	PUSC	Luis Alfonso Pérez	PLN
Alvarado	12,290	Ángel Raquel López	PLN	Ángel Raquel López	PLN
Oreamuno	39,032	Gerardo Walter Granados	PUSC	Marco Vinicio Redondo	PAC
El Guarco	33,788	Luis Rafael Flores	PUSC	William Adolfo Cerdas	PLN
Heredia	103,894	Javier Carvajal	PUSC	José Manuel Ulate	PLN
Barva	32,440	Omar Enrique Trigueros	PUSC	Mercedes Hernández	PLN
Santo Domingo	34,748	Erika Lizette Linares	PLN	Raúl Isidro Bolaños	PLN
Santa Bárbara	29,181	Luis Paulino Rodríguez	PUSC	Rolando Hidalgo	PLN
San Rafael	37,293	Jorge Isaac Herrera	PLN	Alberto Vargas	PAC
San Isidro	16,056	Elvia Dicciana Villalobos	PLN	Elvia Dicciana Villalobos	PLN
Belén	19,834	Víctor Manuel Víquez	PLN	Horacio Alvarado	PUSC
Flores	15,038	Marvin Murillo	PUSC	Jenny Alfaro	PAC
San Pablo	20,813	Aracelly Salas	PUSC	Aracelly Salas	PUSC
Sarapiquí	57,147	Pedro Rojas	PLN	Pedro Rojas	PLN
Liberia	46,703	Ricardo Adolfo Samper	PLN	Carlos Luis Marín	PLN
Nicoya	42,189	Bernardo Vargas	PLN	Lorenzo Rosales	PLN
Santa Cruz	40,821	Pastor Gómez	PUSC	Jorge Enrique Chavarría	PLN
Bagaces	15,972	Guillermo Aragón	PUSC	Luis Ángel Rojas	PLN
Carrillo	27,306	José María Guevara	PUSC	Carlos Gerardo Cantillo	PLN
Cañas	24,076	Gilberto Jerez	PLN	Katia María Solórzano	PLN
Abangares	16,276	Víctor Julio Cabezas	PUSC	Jorge Calvo	PLN
Tilarán	17,871	Jovel Arias	PUSC	Jovel Arias	PUSC
Nandayure	9,985	Luis Gerardo Rodríguez	PGI	Luis Gerardo Rodríguez	PUN
La Cruz	16,505	Junnier Alberto Salazar	PUSC	Carlos Matías Gonzaga	PLN
Hojancha	6,534	Juan Rafael Marín	PLN	Juan Rafael Marín	PLN
Puntarenas	102,504	Omar Obando	PUSC	Agne Gómez	PLN
Esparza	23,963	Dagoberto Venegas	PUSC	Dagoberto Venegas	PUSC
Buenos Aires	40,139	Giovanni Fallas	PUSC	Primo Feliciano Álvarez	PLN
Montes de Oro	11,159	Álvaro Jiménez	PLN	Álvaro Jiménez	PLN
Osa	25,861	José Gabriel Villachica	PUSC	Jorge Alberto Cole	PLN
Aguirre	20,188	Alex Max Contreras	PUSC	Óscar Octavio Monge	OLA
Golfito	33,823	Mauricio Alvarado	PUSC	Jimmy José Cubillo	PLN
Coto Brus	40,082	Gerardo Wilson Chaves	PUSC	Rafael Ángel Navarro	PUSC
Parrita	12,112	Ramón Fernando Rodríguez	PUSC	Gerardo Roger Acuña	PLN
Corredores	37,274	Augusto César Moya	PUSC	Gerardo Ramírez	PLN
Garabito	10,378	Luis Fernando Villalobos	PUSC	Marvin Elizondo	PLN
Limón	89,933	Róger Mainor Rivera	PUSC	Eduardo Barboza	PLN
Pococí	103,121	Manuel Hernández	PUSC	Enrique Alfaro	PLN
Siquirres	52,409	Miguel Gerardo Quirós	PUSC	Edgar Cambronero	PACSI
Talamanca	25,857	Rugeli Morales	PUSC	Rugeli Morales	PUSC
Matina	33,096	Rodrigo Gómez	PRC	Lorenzo Colphan	PLN
Guácimo	34,879	Gerardo Fuentes	PLN	Gerardo Fuentes	PLN

Vote percentage
1. PLN (45.9%)
2. PUSC (17.7%)
3. PAC (14.6%)
4. ML (5.63%)
5. Cantonal parties (5.29%)
6. PUN (2.66%)
7. UpC (2.50%)
8. PRC (1.63%)
9. PIN (1.41%)
10. Other (2.69%)

Party	Mayors		Popular vote	
Party	Number	Change	Votes	%
National Liberation Party	59	▲31	277,589	45.87
Social Christian Unity Party	11	▼36	107,007	17.68
Citizens' Action Party	5	▲4	88,630	14.64
Libertarian Movement	1	▲1	34,073	5.63
Total cantonal parties	3	▲1	31,408	5.19
National Union Party	1	New	16,101	2.66
Union for Change Party	1	New	15,107	2.50
Costa Rican Renewal Party	0	▼1	9,883	1.63
National Integration Party	0	Steady	8,516	1.41
Independent Guanacaste Party	0	▼1	6,925	1.14
Green Ecologist Party	0	New	3,265	0.54
Democratic Force	0	Steady	2,827	0.47
National Rescue Party	0	Steady	1,609	0.27
Democratic Nationalist Alliance	0	New	1,132	0.19
Broad Front	0	New	502	0.08
Homeland First Party	0	New	297	0.05
People's Vanguard Party	0	New	245	0.04
Agrarian Labour Action Party	0	Steady	79	0.01
Total	81	Steady	602,755	100%

By province

Province	PLN %	PUSC %	PAC %	ML %	Reg. %	PUN %	UpC %	PRC %	PIN %	FD %	PRESNA %	ADN %	PPP %	PVP %
San José Province	45.59	16.64	16.60	2.95	9.62	1.75	2.26	0.32	4.27	-	-	-	-	-
Alajuela	55.41	11.17	17.77	4.60	5.32	1.49	3.65	0.59	-	-	-	-	-	-
Cartago Province	44.06	18.04	12.47	11.32	6.32	5.60	2.19	-	-	-	-	-	-	-
Heredia	43.76	20.88	21.49	2.23	4.54	0.75	3.82	1.93	0.46	-	-	-	-	0.14
Guanacaste	43.19	14.69	9.54	2.98	11.41	8.41	4.03	0.71	-	2.41	0.76	1.87	-	-
Puntarenas	43.30	27.03	8.76	6.19	3.70	1.50	-	8.45	0.63	-	-	-	0.44	-
Limón	34.93	24.46	9.07	16.50	4.06	1.53	0.87	2.83	0.30	2.77	2.34	-	-	0.34
Total	45.87	17.68	14.64	5.63	6.95	2.66	2.50	1.64	1.41	0.47	0.27	0.19	0.05	0.04
Source: TSE

=== Alderpeople ===
The elections of municipal councilors of Costa Rica in 2006 were an electoral process held in parallel with the presidential and legislative elections. In them the 495 tenure aldermen and the 495 alternates that conform the 81 Municipal Councils were chosen.

The Central Canton of San José, the most populous, named 13 aldermen. Desamparados and Alajuela named 11. Others less populated (Puntarenas, Limón, Pococí, Heredia, Cartago, La Unión, San Carlos, Goicoechea, Pérez Zeledón, etc.) named 9. Others even smaller (Tibás, Grecia, Vázquez de Coronado, Montes de Oca, Siquirres, Escazú, Turrialba, etc.) appointed 7 council members. Finally, the smallest (Turrubares, San Mateo, Santa Ana, Mora, Montes de Oro, Talamanca, etc.) named 5.

Alderpeople
National Liberation	45.60%
Citizens' Action	27.80%
Social Christian Unity	11.80%
Libertarian Movement	7.20%
Regionalist	6.80%
National Union	0.60%
Union for Change	0.20%

Parties	Popular vote			Alderpeople	
Parties	Votes	%	±pp	Total	+/-
National Liberation Party (PLN)	585,809	36.41	+7.20	228	+50
Citizens' Action Party (PAC)	394,854	24.54	+4.10	139	+38
Social Christian Unity Party (PUSC)	143,008	8.89	-22.03	59	-121
Libertarian Movement (ML)	135,148	8.40	+2.85	36	+49
Costa Rican Renewal Party (PRC)	50,416	3.13	-0.46	4	-3
Union for Change Party (UpC)	45,885	2.85	New	1	New
National Union Party (PUN)	42,853	2.66	New	3	New
National Restoration Party (PREN)	22,579	1.40	New	2	New
Homeland First Party (PPP)	19,326	1.20	New	0	New
Democratic Nationalist Alliance (ADN)	14,982	0.93	New	0	New
National Integration Party (PIN)	14,162	0.88	-0.77	0	-1
Democratic Force (FD)	13,912	0.86	-1.78	0	-4
Patriotic Union (UP)	13,075	0.81	New	0	New
Cartago Agrarian Union Party (PUAC)	9,029	0.56	+0.56	2	+2
Agrarian Labour Action Party (PALA)	8,979	0.56	-0.05	3	+1
Broad Front (FA)	8,068	0.50	New	0	New
Independent Guanacaste Party (PGI)	6,536	0.41	+0.36	2	+2
Escazu's Progressive Yoke (YPE)	6,116	0.38	-0.13	2	-1
United Left Coalition (IU)	6,108	0.38	New	0	New
21st Century Curridabat (CSXXI)	5,643	0.35	+0.10	2	+1
Authentic Heredian Party (PAH)	5,479	0.34	New	0	New
Alajuelense Democratic Action (PADA)	5,357	0.33	+0.33	0	New
Palmarenean Union Party (PUPal)	5,015	0.31	New	2	New
Provincial Integration Three Party (PIP-3)	4,425	0.28	New	0	New
Party of the Sun (PdS)	3,999	0.25	-0.07	2	0
Goicoechea in Action Party (PGEA)	3,536	0.22	New	0	New
Authentic Labourer of Coronado Party (PALABRA)	3,098	0.19	New	1	New
Green Ecologist Party (PVE)	3,070	0.19	New	0	New
Progressive Moravia Party (PMP)	2,929	0.18	New	1	New
The Bridge and Paths of Mora (PYCM)	2,815	0.17	New	2	New
Communal Pro-Curri Party (PCPC)	2,664	0.17	New	1	New
New Alajuelita Party (PALNU)	2,076	0.13	+0.01	1	0
Cantonal Action Independent Siquirres Party (PACSI)	1,870	0.12	+0.05	1	+1
Cartago Agrarian Force (FAC)	1,735	0.11	-0.16	0	New
Workers' and Peasants' Movement (MTC)	1,718	0.11	New	0	New
Desamparadenean Communal Force Party (FCD)	1,676	0.10	New	0	New
Authentic Sarapiquenean Party (PASAR)	1,460	0.09	-0.03	1	0
Quepeña Action Party (PAQ)	1,452	0.09	-0.04	2	0
Independent Belemite Party (PIB)	1,303	0.08	+0.04	1	+1
Authentic Turrialban Cartago Party (PATC)	1,217	0.08	New	0	New
Humanist Party of Heredia (PH-Her)	1,047	0.07	+0.05	0	0
Humanist Party of Montes de Oca (PH-MdO)	986	0.06	-0.02	0	-1
Autonomous Oromontan Party (PAO)	859	0.05	New	1	New
Authentic Pilaric Party (PAUPI)	830	0.05	New	0	New
Ecological Garabito Party (PEG)	770	0.05	-0.01	1	-2
Alliance for San José Party (PASJ)	542	0.03	-0.05	0	New
Aguirre Labour Organization Party (OLA)	505	0.03	New	0	New
New Feminist League Party (NLF)	79	0.01	New	0	New
Total	1,609,000	100.00	-	500	-3
Invalid votes	53,796	3.24			
Votes cast / turnout	1,662,796	65.19			
Abstentions	887,817	34.81			
Registered voters	2,550,613	100%			

=== Municipal councils, syndics, district councils ===
Syndics
PLN	72.65%
PUSC	14.10%
PAC	4.70%
Regionalist	3.42%
ML	1.92%
PUN	1.92%
UpC	0.64%
PIN	0.43%
PRC	0.21%

District councillors
PLN	50.11%
PUSC	19.19%
PAC	14.66%
Regionalist	6.29%
ML	3.78%
PUN	2.24%
UpC	1.71%
PIN	1.01%
PRC	1.01%

Parties and coalitions	Popular vote			Syndics		District Councillors	
Parties and coalitions	Votes	%	±pp	Total	+/-	Total	+/-
National Liberation Party (PLN)	268,944	45.17	+11.36	340	+148	940	+256
Social Christian Unity Party (PUSC)	106,488	17.89	-18.96	66	-162	360	-439
Citizens' Action Party (PAC)	95,427	16.03	+3.42	22	+8	275	+93
Libertarian Movement (ML)	33,069	5.55	+2.29	9	+5	71	+45
Union for Change Party (UpC)	13,684	2.30	New	3	New	32	New
National Union Party (PUN)	12,325	2.07	New	9	New	42	New
Costa Rican Renewal Party (PRC)	9,516	1.60	-1.61	1	-3	19	-29
National Integration Party (PIN)	7,863	1.32	+0.68	2	+1	19	+13
Independent Guanacaste Party (PGI)	6,912	1.16	+0.92	1	-1	21	+12
Ramonense Solidarity Party (PSRa)	3,903	0.66	New	3	New	17	New
Escazu's Progressive Yoke (YPE)	3,629	0.61	+0.08	1	0	5	+1
21st Century Curridabat (CSXXI)	3,322	0.56	+0.28	4	+2	8	+4
Green Ecologist Party (PVE)	3,275	0.55	New	0	New	5	New
Palmarenean Union Party (PUPal)	2,286	0.38	New	0	New	9	New
Party of the Sun (PdS)	2,059	0.35	-0.02	0	-2	6	-2
Democratic Force (FD)	1,988	0.33	-0.97	0	0	1	-7
Goicoechea in Action Party (PGEA)	1,936	0.33	New	0	New	4	New
Cantonal Action Independent Siquirres Party (PACSI)	1,914	0.32	-0.01	1	-1	7	0
Barbarenean Integration Party (PINBAR)	1,801	0.30	New	2	New	10	New
The Bridge and Paths of Mora (PYCM)	1,539	0.26	New	1	New	6	New
Alliance for San José Party (PASJ)	1,490	0.25	-0.55	0	0	0	-3
Aguirre Labour Organization Party (OLA)	1,381	0.23	New	2	New	4	New
Communal Pro-Curri Party (PCPC)	1,032	0.17	New	0	New	2	New
Broad Front (FA)	855	0.14	New	0	New	1	New
Belemite Independent Party (PIB)	724	0.12	+0.01	0	0	1	0
New Alajuelita Party (PANUAL)	717	0.12	New	0	New	1	New
Quepeña Action Party (PAQ)	676	0.11	-0.08	0	0	2	-1
Authentic Turrialban Cartago Party (PATC)	597	0.10	New	0	New	0	New
Desamparadenean Communal Force Party (FCD)	549	0.09	New	0	New	0	New
Authentic Santaneño Party (PAUSA)	544	0.09	New	0	New	1	New
Authentic Labourer of Coronado Party (PALABRA)	543	0.09	New	0	New	0	New
Humanist Party of Montes de Oca (PH-MdO)	539	0.09	+0.01	0	0	0	-1
Party of the People and for the People (PPPP)	521	0.09	New	0	New	0	New
National Rescue Party (PRESNA)	517	0.09	-0.38	0	-1	1	-10
Provincial Integration Three Party (PIP-3)	511	0.09	New	1	New	3	New
Authentic Pilaric Party (PAUPI)	459	0.08	New	0	New	1	New
Democratic Nationalist Alliance (ADN)	417	0.07	New	0	New	2	New
Autonomous Oromontan Party (PAO)	417	0.07	New	0	New	0	New
Homeland First Party (PPP)	268	0.05	New	0	New	0	New
Poaseña Union Party (PUNPO)	241	0.04	New	0	New	0	New
People's Vanguard Party (PVP)	198	0.03	New	0	New	0	New
Progressive Moravia Party (PMP)	169	0.03	New	0	New	0	New
Agrarian Labour Action Party (PALA)	101	0.02	-0.09	0	New	0	-3
Total	592,927	100.00		468	+5	1876	+22
Invalid votes	17,452	2.85	-1.09				
Votes cast / turnout	610,379	23.61	+0.97				
Abstentions	1,983,117	76.39					
Registered voters	2,593,496						

== See also ==
- Local government in Costa Rica
- List of mayors in Costa Rica
