= 2006 Costa Rican general election =

- 5 February 2006
- Presidential election
- Registered: 2,550,613
- Turnout: 65.21% (▼3.63pp)
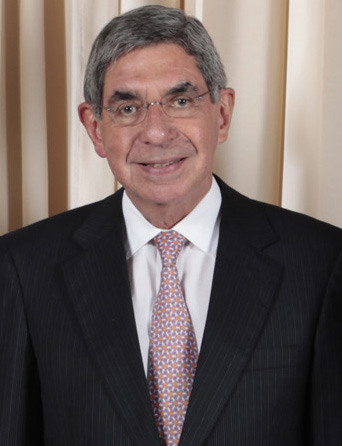

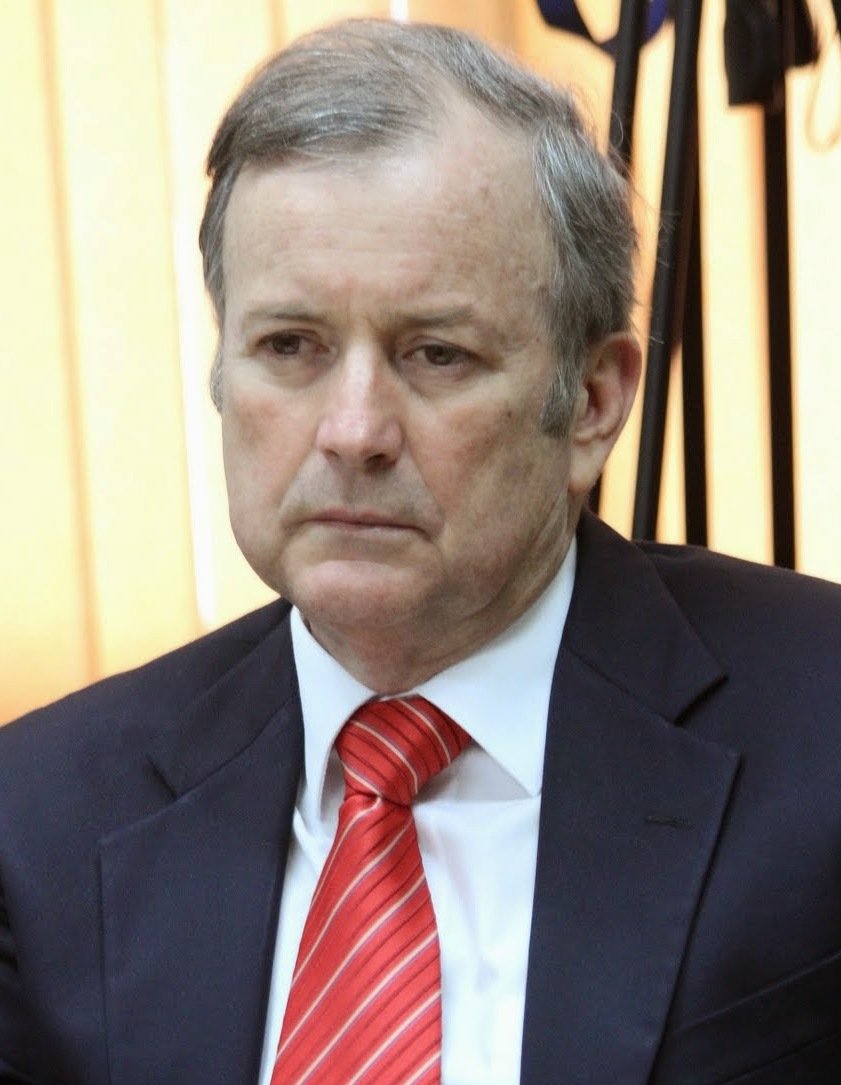

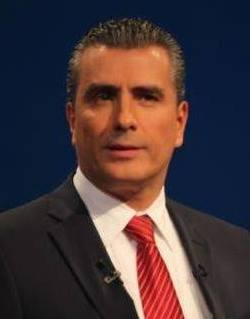
Nominee	Óscar Arias	Ottón Solís	Otto Guevara
Party	PLN	PAC	PML
Running mate	Laura Chinchilla; Kevin Casas	Epsy Campbell; Marita González	Rogelio Pardo; Ana Alfaro
Popular vote	664,551	646,382	137,710
Percentage	40.92%	39.80%	8.76%
- Results by district Arias: 20–30% 30–40% 40–50% 50–60% 60–70% 70-80% 80-90% Solís: 30-40% 40–50% 50-60% 60–70% Toledo: 30–40%
President before election
Abel Pacheco
PUSC
Elected President
Óscar Arias
PLN
- Legislative election
- All 57 seats in the Legislative Assembly; 29 seats needed for a majority
- Turnout: 65.20% (▼3.64pp)
Party	Leader	Vote %	Seats	+/–
PLN	Óscar Arias Sánchez	36.54	25	+8
PAC	Ottón Solís Fallas	25.34	14	0
PML	Otto Guevara Guth	9.17	6	0
PUSC	Ricardo Toledo Carranza	7.82	5	−14
PUN	José Manuel Echandi Meza	2.50	1	New
PREN	Carlos Avendaño Calvo	2.04	1	New
PASE	Óscar López Arias	1.59	1	New
FA	José Merino del Río	1.10	1	New
This lists parties that won seats. See the complete results below.
Results by province

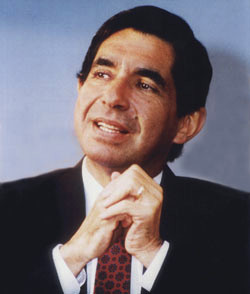
Óscar Arias

General elections were held in Costa Rica on 5 February 2006. In the presidential election, Óscar Arias of the National Liberation Party, a former president and Nobel Peace Prize laureate, won over Ottón Solís of the Citizens' Action Party and twelve other minor-party candidates.

Although Arias had been expected to win comfortably, the race proved much closer than anticipated. Preliminary results, with 88.45% of ballots counted, showed Arias leading with 40.51% of the vote, compared to 40.29% for Solís, a margin of only 3,250 votes. Owing to the narrow difference, the Supreme Electoral Court ordered a manual recount of all ballots and postponed the official declaration of the winner until the process was completed. The recount, concluded approximately two weeks later, confirmed Arias's victory.

In the parliamentary election, the National Liberation Party emerged as the largest party in the Legislative Assembly for the first time since 1994. It won the highest number of seats, although it fell four seats short of an outright majority.

== Presidential election ==
=== Candidates ===
There were fourteen candidates running for the presidency in the 2006 elections. However, only a few rose in the polls above the error margin.

==== Óscar Arias ====
Óscar Arias, the candidate of the National Liberation Party (PLN), was widely regarded as the frontrunner throughout the campaign. Arias had previously served as President of Costa Rica from 1986 to 1990.

Internationally, he was best known for his role in promoting the Esquipulas Peace Agreement, which contributed to the resolution of armed conflicts in Central America during the 1980s, particularly in Nicaragua, El Salvador, and Guatemala. In recognition of these efforts, he was awarded the Nobel Peace Prize in 1987. He later established the Arias Foundation for Peace and Human Progress, an organization dedicated to peacebuilding, demilitarization, conflict resolution, and the promotion of human rights Through this group Arias helped to settle conflicts throughout Latin America, participating in the process to demilitarize Haiti and Panama.

Arias made the fight against poverty and corruption the headlining issues of his campaign. During public appearances he promised to provide scholarships to poor families so their children could stay in school and not have to work (a promise he fulfilled on his first day in office), and spoke about the urgency of signing the Central American Free Trade Agreement in order to create high-paying jobs for Costa Rica's youth.

With the pre-election opinion polls favoring Óscar Arias, he did not foresee such stiff competition from his closest rival Ottón Solís. At first count, there was a difference of only 0.4% (Óscar Arias = 40.6% vs Ottón Solís = 40.2%), or about 3,200 votes. Large numbers of voters supporting candidates other than Óscar Arias and Ottón Solís chose to cast their ballot for Ottón Solís at the last minute, with the objective of keeping Óscar Arias from winning the elections.

Election laws in Costa Rica dictate, among other things, that a candidate requires 40% of the votes to avoid a second round of voting for election of the President. Further, in case of a tie with candidates having the same number of votes, the elder of the two wins the seat.

==== Ottón Solís ====
Solís was the candidate of the Citizens' Action Party (PAC). Solís is a co-founder of the party and was its candidate in the 2002 presidential elections. In that election he ran against Rolando Araya of the National Liberation Party (PLN) and Abel Pacheco of the Social Christian Unity Party (PUSC). On 3 February 2002 the first round was held, in which Solís lost. He was running in an effort to break up the two-party system in Costa Rica.

Solís is a critic of the Central American Free Trade Agreement (CAFTA). He has called for the renegotiations of CAFTA to add protection for vulnerable farmers and industrial companies. He has said that in its current form, "CAFTA will increase poverty in Central America because it will displace farmers and industrial workers and will increase the cost of health care." He also said that "I never imagined CAFTA was going to be so one sided," and "The law of the jungle benefits the big beast. We are a very small beast." Solís sees several possible detrimental aspects that could come from CAFTA. First he claims that it will cause the breakup of the public telecommunications and electricity monopolies which will have to be privatized. Additionally he thinks that the lowered trade barriers will cause a flood of cheap food products from the United States to come in and this will hurt the internal market for small-scale farmers.

==== Otto Guevara ====
Otto Guevara Guth was the co-founder, along with Rigoberto Stewart and Raúl Costales Domínguez, of the Movimiento Libertario, a libertarian party. He was elected to the legislature in 1998. Guevara originally ran as a libertarian politician who claimed to believe in cutting of government programs, which he saw as excessive. Some of these programs included government subsidies for food, US$10,000 subsidies for housing, and free textbooks paid for by the state. He also rejected government funding for the party's political campaigns.

For the 2006 election, a faction of the Movimiento Libertario led by Guevara took control of the party and backed down on many of the party's initial positions. They decided to accept government funding, which was previously stated by him as immoral, and on several interviews he has claimed that public education needs to be strengthened by more funding, that the country needs to build more jails, and several other issues that will actually increase government spending.

On the foreign policy front, Guevara is in favor of advancing civil liberties abroad. He is a critic of the Castro government in Cuba, accusing politicians in Latin America of being accomplices to the lack of political liberty by not speaking out against the country's government. Guevara has linked the lack of political liberties in Cuba to what he sees as an overextension of the state in Costa Rica. Specifically he sees that eliminating regulations which, according to him, affect the development of the economy, as being a part of his program to protect political liberty. Specifically he sees regulations on agroindustry as being a considerable problem.

He hadn't clear if his position on these issues changed along with the others. Given that his position on Cuba was likely the result of influence by Raúl Costales, an exiled Cuban who was one of the party founders and a long-time party secretary, and that he separated himself from the party after they voted to accept money from the government, it's likely Guevara's foreign policy has changed.

==== Ricardo Toledo ====
Ricardo Toledo Carranza was the presidential candidate of the governing Social Christian Unity Party (PUSC). A longtime member of the party, he had held several leadership positions within the organization, including president of its youth wing, coordinator for the party's southern regional districts, and head of party organization and management. He also served as a senior official and vice minister in the Ministry of Labour and Social Security in 1982.

Toledo was regarded as a close political ally of outgoing President Abel Pacheco. Prior to his presidential candidacy, he served as a deputy in the Legislative Assembly during the 2002–2006 term. His candidacy took place amid declining public support for the PUSC, which had been affected by a series of political scandals involving prominent party figures in the years preceding the election.

==== Antonio Álvarez ====
Antonio Álvarez was the candidate for the party that he heads, the Union for Change Party (UPC).

He is running on a platform of political change. In an interview with newspaper Al Día Álvarez said that one thing that he believes negatively affects the country is unregulated immigration of Nicaraguans. He recommends stricter penalties for employers of immigrants who might be exploiting the Nicaraguans for cheap labor, and for increased use of documentation for immigrants.

On the economic front, Álvarez is interested in helping to build infrastructure because he believes it is essential to the continued economic development of Costa Rica. He is in favor of using the grant of public work and the emergency road network plan to build up the highways. He believes that a major problem with the health system is that it is inadequately funded and that violators are not penalized. Specifically he points to businesses who are not paying in order to have enough money to fund changes to the medical system. He is not in favor of legalizing same-sex marriage but is in favor of extending the benefits of marriage over to a civil union. In order to fight corruption in the municipalities and to ensure that money reaches the level that it is supposed to, Álvarez recommends more oversight in the hiring process so that the most qualified and honest people are in the positions where money distribution is involved. He is in favor of programs which encourage entrepreneurship, especially among the younger generation. Also for college students, he is not in favor of eliminating exams for the baccalaureate, but rather wants to expand education through increased infrastructure, new programs including secondary schools, and diversifying education through the regions.

== Campaign ==
Polemic over the Central American Free Trade Agreement was influential in the campaign as many candidates and parties took positions in support or reject of the treaty and Costa Rican society was split over the issue.

== Results ==
=== President ===
Candidate	Party	Votes	%
Óscar Arias	National Liberation Party	664,551	40.92
Ottón Solís	Citizens' Action Party	646,382	39.80
Otto Guevara	Libertarian Movement	137,710	8.48
Ricardo Toledo Carranza	Social Christian Unity Party	57,655	3.55
Antonio Álvarez Desanti	Union for Change Party	39,557	2.44
José Manuel Echandi Meza	National Union Party	26,593	1.64
Juan José Vargas Fallas	Homeland First Party	17,594	1.08
Bolívar Serrano	Costa Rican Renewal Party	15,539	0.96
Walter Muñoz Céspedes	National Integration Party	5,136	0.32
José Miguel Villalobos Umaña	Democratic Nationalist Alliance	3,670	0.23
Vladimir de la Cruz	Democratic Force	3,020	0.19
Álvaro Montero Mejía	National Rescue Party	2,430	0.15
Humberto Vargas Carbonell	United Left	2,291	0.14
José Arce	Patriotic Union	1,864	0.11
Total		1,623,992	100.00
Valid votes		1,623,992	97.64
Invalid votes		30,422	1.83
Blank votes		8,834	0.53
Total votes		1,663,248	100.00
Registered voters/turnout		2,550,613	65.21
Source: Election Resources

==== By province ====
Province	PLN %	PAC %	ML %	PUSC %	UpC %	PUN %	PPP %	Other %
San José	38.9	42.4	8.3	2.8	2.7	1.9	1.1	1.9
Alajuela	40.5	43.8	6.6	2.7	2.2	1.3	1.0	1.8
Cartago	40.8	38.2	10.3	3.3	2.8	1.8	1.3	1.4
Heredia	39.2	43.7	7.7	2.8	2.4	1.5	0.9	1.8
Puntarenas	47.2	30.1	9.6	6.5	1.8	1.0	1.1	2.7
Limón	40.4	29.6	13.5	6.5	2.7	1.9	1.2	4.3
Guanacaste	49.9	31.3	6.5	5.9	1.6	1.1	0.8	2.8
Total	40.9	39.8	8.5	3.6	2.4	1.6	1.1	2.1

=== Legislative Assembly ===
While PLN managed to return as the main political force in the Assembly, PAC became for the first time the second largest political group in the Parliament. The PUSC on the other hand, dogged by corruption scandals, suffered a humiliating defeat, passing from being the first parliamentary party with 19 deputies to the fourth place one with only 5. The Libertarian Movement kept its 6 seats while the newly resurrected National Union Party led by former Costa Rican Ombudsman José Manuel Echandi won one seat for Echandi himself (who later would resign from the party, leaving it seatless).

Three then regional political parties won one seat each; the socialist Broad Front, disability rights party Accessibility without Exclusion Party and Christian party National Restoration. Broad Front's seat went for Spanish émigré José Merino and was the return of the left in the Parliament after one period without representation. The recently founded party Unión for Change made by PLN's dissident Antonio Álvarez Desanti did not win any seats.

Party	Votes	%	Seats	+/–
National Liberation Party	589,731	36.54	25	+8
Citizens' Action Party	409,030	25.34	17	+3
Libertarian Movement	147,934	9.17	6	0
Social Christian Unity Party	126,284	7.82	5	–14
Costa Rican Renewal Party	55,798	3.46	0	–1
National Union Party	40,280	2.50	1	New
Union for Change Party	37,994	2.35	0	New
National Restoration Party	32,909	2.04	1	New
Accessibility without Exclusion Party	25,690	1.59	1	New
Homeland First Party	26,438	1.64	0	New
Broad Front	17,751	1.10	1	New
Democratic Nationalist Alliance	14,537	0.90	0	New
Democratic Force	13,675	0.85	0	0
National Integration Party	12,945	0.80	0	0
Agrarian Labour Action Party	11,713	0.73	0	0
Cartago Agrarian Union Party	9,395	0.58	0	0
Patriotic Union	8,612	0.53	0	New
Alajuelense Democratic Action	7,867	0.49	0	New
United Left	5,744	0.36	0	New
Independent Guanacaste Party	5,010	0.31	0	New
Authentic Heredian Party	3,556	0.22	0	New
Provincial Integration Party	2,835	0.18	0	New
New Feminist League Party	2,357	0.15	0	New
Green Ecologist Party	1,885	0.12	0	New
Workers' and Farmers' Movement	1,507	0.09	0	New
Cartago Agrarian Force Party	1,482	0.09	0	0
Cartago Turrialban Authentic Party	1,002	0.06	0	New
Total	1,613,961	100.00	57	0
Valid votes	1,613,961	97.06		
Invalid votes	34,286	2.06		
Blank votes	14,652	0.88		
Total votes	1,662,899	100.00		
Registered voters/turnout	2,550,613	65.20		
Source: Election Resources

==== By constituency ====
Constituency	PLN		PAC		ML		PUSC		PRC		PUN		UpC		PPP		FD		PIN		Other	
Constituency	%	S	%	S	%	S	%	S	%	S	%	S	%	S	%	S	%	S	%	S	%	S
San José	33.6	7	26.1	5	9.2	2	6.2	2	2.1	0	2.8	1	2.2	0	2.1	0	0.8	0	1.1	0	13.8	3
Alajuela	37.3	5	27.7	4	7.8	1	6.9	1	4.2	0	2.5	0	2.4	0	1.3	0	0.7	0	0.5	0	8.7	0
Cartago	35.2	3	27.7	3	10.4	1	7.1	0	2.0	0	1.9	0	2.8	0	1.4	0	0.7	0	1.1	0	9.8	0
Heredia	36.4	3	30.6	2	9.0	0	8.3	0	4.2	0	1.9	0	2.2	0	1.6	0	0.7	0	0.8	0	4.3	0
Puntarenas	44.7	2	18.6	1	10.0	1	12.8	1	5.4	0	1.3	0	2.2	0	1.6	0	1.6	0	0.3	0	2.0	0
Limón	37.0	2	17.4	1	11.7	1	12.3	1	7.2	0	3.8	0	3.1	0	1.4	0	1.6	0	0.8	0	3.7	0
Guanacaste	44.6	3	16.6	1	7.2	0	10.9	0	4.9	0	3.1	0	1.8	0	0.8	0	0.7	0	0.4	0	8.9	0
Total	36.5	25	25.3	17	9.2	6	8.2	5	3.5	0	2.5	1	2.4	0	1.6	0	0.8	0	0.8	0	9.5	3

== See also ==
- 2006 Costa Rican municipal elections
