= Ricardo Toledo Carranza =

Costa Rican politician and lawyer (born 1958)

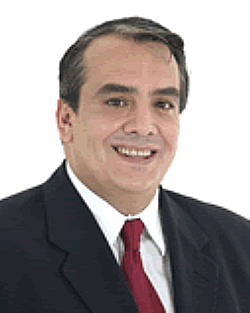
- Toledo in 2006

Ambassador of Costa Rica to Argentina
- In office 8 May 2006 – 8 May 2010
- President: Óscar Arias Sánchez

Deputy of the Legislative Assembly of Costa Rica
- In office 1 May 2002 – 30 April 2006
- Preceded by: Carlos Eduardo Vargas Pagán
- Succeeded by: Ofelia Taitelbaum
- Constituency: San José (4th Office)

Minister of the Presidency of Costa Rica
- In office 23 May 2003 – 6 September 2004
- President: Abel Pacheco de la Espriella
- Preceded by: Rina Contreras López
- Succeeded by: Lineth Saborío Chaverri

Manager of Correos de Costa Rica
- In office 1998–2001
- President: Miguel Ángel Rodríguez

Personal details
- Born: Ricardo Jaime Toledo Carranza; 23 September 1958 (age 68) San José, Costa Rica
- Party: PUSC
- Education: University of Costa Rica (BSc)

Ricardo Jaime Toledo Carranza (born 23 September 1958) is a Costa Rican lawyer, diplomat and politician. A member of the Social Christian Unity Party, he served as Minister of the Presidency from 2003 to 2004 and as a deputy in the Legislative Assembly from 2002 to 2006.

Toledo was the PUSC candidate in the 2006 presidential election, in which he received 3.55% of the vote and finished fourth among the candidates. The result represented a significant decline in electoral support for the PUSC compared with previous elections and was widely interpreted as evidence of the party's weakening political influence following a series of political scandals in the early 2000s.
