= Libertarian Movement =

Libertarian Movement may refer to one of the following subjects:

- Libertarian Movement (Costa Rica)
- Libertarian movement in the United States, see Libertarianism in the United States
- Libertarian migration movement to New Hampshire, see Free State Project
