= Escazu's Progressive Yoke =

Escazu's Progressive Yoke Yunta Progresista Escazuceña
- Founded: 4 November 1996
- Ideology: Localism

Party flag

Website
- www.yunta.cr

Escazu's Progressive Yoke (Spanish: Yunta Progresista Escazuceña) is a local political party in Escazu Canton, Costa Rica. The party currently holds Escazu's Mayoralty, two out of seven seats in the Cantonal Council and two out of three District Syndics.

The party's first electoral run in the 2002 aldermen’s election earned it 7,765 votes and three seats in Council. The following 2002 mayoral election gave it 2,670 votes earning one Syndic and four District councilmen. For the 2006 general election, the party attained 6,116 votes and two aldermen, and the same year’s mayoral election gave them 3,629 votes earning a Syndic and five councilmen. In the 2010 mayoral election, the party attained the Mayoralty with its nominee Arnoldo Barahona, plus several councilmen and the Syndics of Escazu City and San Rafael. In the now unified municipal election of 2016 the party manages to re-elect Barahona, and also attained two aldermen, the Syndics of San Rafael and San Antonio and several councilmen.
