= Thelma Curling Rodríguez =

Costa Rican judge and politician (born 1933)

Thelma Cecilia Curling Rodriguez

Member of the Parliament of Costa Rica
- In office 1982–1986

Personal details
- Born: Thelma Cecilia Curling Rodriguez; 19 February 1933 (age 93) San José, Costa Rica
- Education: Universidad de Costa Rica
- Profession: Judge, Lawyer

Thelma Cecilia Curling Rodríguez (born 19 February 1933) is a jurist and politician from Costa Rica. She is a defender of women's rights and was the first woman of Afro-Costa Rican descent to become a member of the parliament of Costa Rica.

== Early life and education ==
She was born in the Costa Rican capital San José and attended elementary school in the Escuela España and high school in the Colegio Superior de Señoritas. Following she studied law in the University of Costa Rica and became a lawyer in 1959. Influenced by her Afro Costa Rican descent, she chose Limón to work as a lawyer.

== Professional career ==
Having arrived in Limon, she became a teacher from 1960 to 1962. As a lawyer she represented the banks Banco Nacional de Costa Rica and Banco Crédito Agrícola of Cartago. In the province of Limon she was a judge in several courts. Internationally, she represented Costa Rica in the Commission on the Status of Women of the United Nations between 1971 and 1988 and took part in women rights related congresses in Tunisia, Brazil or Mexico. In Switzerland she attended an exhibit on Women Peasants from Costa Rica with the writer Carmen Naranjo and in South Africa she took part in the Black Women Congress in 1995. In 2014 she was elected the president of the Workers Union of Women of Costa Rica. In 2021, she was one of the women portrayed during the exhibit Impronta Femenina Costa Rica 1821–2021 in the Museo de Jade in San José.

== Political career ==
Between 1970 and 1974 she acted as the Municipal President of the Canton Limón and between 1982 and 1986 she was a member of Parliament as the first women of Afro Costa Rican descent, and also the first woman to represent the province of Limón. She is a member of the National Liberation Party (PLN) for which she led the women's branch for eighteen years.

=== Political position ===
A known defender of women's rights, she encouraged women from Limón province to take part in the political process, be it as a voters or present to themselves as candidates. She also demanded better education conditions for women.
