= Ofelia Taitelbaum =

Costa Rican politician (born 1949)

Masha Taitelbaum Yoselewich, better known as Ofelia Taitelbaum (born 4 January 1949) is a Costa Rican criminal and former politician and businesswoman who served as the National Ombudswoman from 2009 to 2014 and as a member of the Legislative Assembly of Costa Rica from 2006 to 2010.

== Biography ==
Taitelbaum was born in San José on January 4, 1949, to a Costa Rican Jewish family. She graduated from Universidad de Costa Rica with a degree in biology, later studying business administration at INCAE Business School and pollution control in London. During the first term of President Óscar Arias, Taitelbaum served as Deputy Minister of Housing and Human Settlements, later serving outside the government as vice president of the National Mortgage Bank. Taitelbaum served as director of several businesses and foundations, and later moved into consulting. Taitelbaum was elected to the Legislative Assembly of Costa Rica in the 2006 Costa Rican general election, gaining a seat in San José Province as a member of the National Liberation Party. Her term in office was punctuated by her support for the Free Trade Agreement with the United States, a subject that some found controversial.

The Legislative Assembly elected Taitelbaum Ombudswoman in 2009. Media sources like La Nación viewed her appointment as controversial, due to her closeness to Presidents Óscar Arias and Laura Chinchilla (both of the National Liberation Party). She was re-elected to her position in 2014. The Public Ministry opened an investigation against Taitelbaum due to a complaint by a seamstress surnamed Otárola. The complaint alleged that while trying to help Otárola receive benefits from the CCSS, Taitelbaum was also serving as a consultant for a private company and received a payout of 32 million Costa Rican colón over a period of five years. Taitelbaum denied receiving the funds, hence why the money was not declared to the Director General of Taxation or the Treasury Ministry. Taitelbaum was found guilty of 32 counts of forgery and coercion on August 29, 2019, and sentenced to 96 years in prison (later reduced to 9 years).
