= Carmen Quesada Santamaría =

Costa Rican politician and teacher

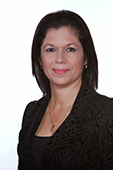
Carmen Elena Quesada Santamaría

Carmen Elena Quesada Santamaría (born 5 October 1969 in Turrialba, Costa Rica) is a Costa Rican politician and teacher. She joined the Social Christian Unity Party as a teenager and later, the Libertarian Movement. In 2009 and 2010, she occupied a seat in the Directive Board of the Atlantic Basin Ports and Economical Development Administrative Board (JAPDEVA, its Spanish initials). In the 2010 and 2014 Costa Rican general election, she contested as a candidate for the Legislative Assembly, being elected as a deputy representing Limón Province for the 2014–2018 administration. On 2 September 2015, she left the Libertarian Movement, remaining as an independent for the rest of the term. As a deputy, she was a member of the investigative commission for the Panama Papers and elected First Secretary of the Legislative Director for the 2017–2018 period.

On 25 November 2019, she founded the Costa Rican Social Justice Party (Partido Justicia Social Costarricense) and was elected as the president of the party.
