= Marvin Calvo Montoya =

Costa Rican politicians

Marvin Gerardo Calvo Montoya (Santa Bárbara, Costa Rica, February 4, 1961) is a biologist and politician from Costa Rica.

== Career ==
Montoya served as teacher at the Universidad Estatal a Distancia, between 1996 and 2004, and later became an administrator of the University Center of Alajuela of that same public university. In 2002 general election, Christian National Alliance Party nominated him as its presidential and main legislative candidate. Between 2009 and 2015 worked as Coordinator of the Educational Area in the Integral Attention Center Jorge Arturo Montero (known as jail La Reforma, biggest jail in Costa Rica). In the 2019 internal election of the COLYPRO (main costarrican teachers' professional college) participated as vicepresidential candidate. National Integration Party nominated him as its candidate for Mayor of Alajuela in the 2020 municipal election.
