= 1998 Costa Rican general election =

- 1 February 1998
- Presidential election
- Registered: 2,045,980
- Turnout: 69.99% (▼11.12pp)
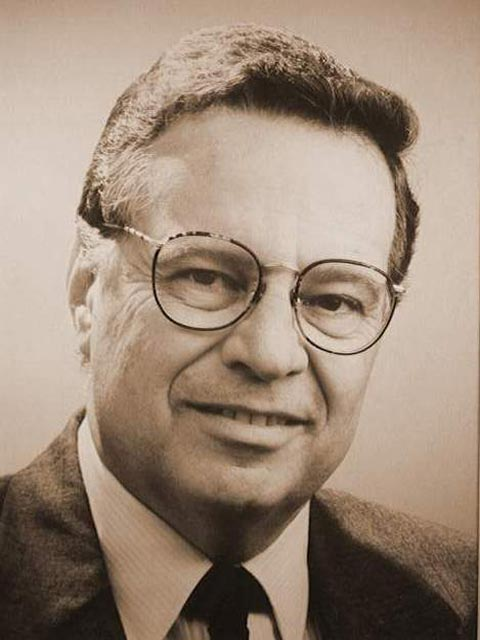

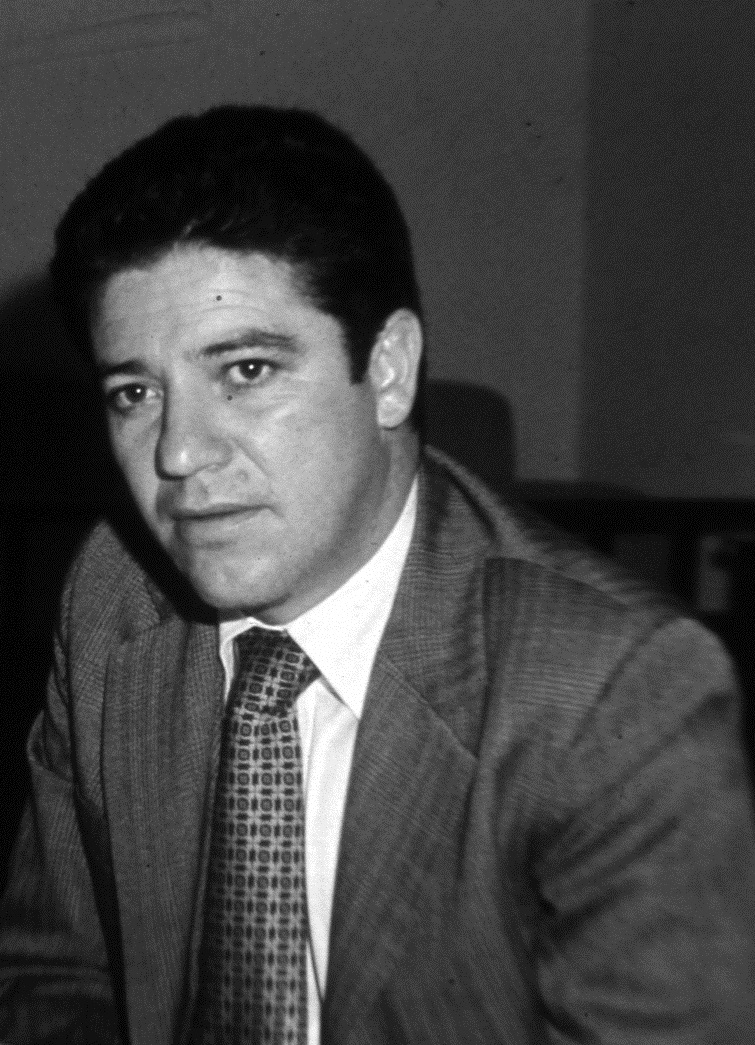
Nominee	Miguel Ángel Rodríguez	José Miguel Corrales
Party	PUSC	PLN
Running mate	Astrid Fischel; Elizabeth Odio	Rose Marie Karpinsky; Joyce Zurcher
Popular vote	652,160	618,834
Percentage	46.96%	44.56%
- Results by district Rodríguez: 40–50% 50–60% 60–70% 70–80% Corrales: 40–50% 50–60% 60–70% 70-80%
President before election
José María Figueres
PLN
Elected President
Miguel Ángel Rodríguez
PUSC
- Legislative election
- All 57 seats in the Legislative Assembly; 29 seats needed for a majority
- Turnout: 69.92% (▼11.17pp)
Party	Leader	Vote %	Seats	+/–
PUSC	Miguel Ángel Rodríguez	41.18	27	+2
PLN	José Miguel Corrales Bolaños	34.83	23	−5
PFD	Vladimir de la Cruz	5.77	3	+1
PML	Federico Malavassi Calvo	3.08	1	New
PIN	Walter Muñoz Céspedes	2.78	1	New
PRC	Justo Orozco	2.02	1	New
PALA	Guido Octavio Vargas Artavia	1.23	1	+1
This lists parties that won seats. See the complete results below.
Results by province

General elections were held in Costa Rica on 1 February 1998. Miguel Ángel Rodríguez of the Social Christian Unity Party won the presidential election, whilst his party also won the parliamentary election. Voter turnout was 70%, the lowest since the 1950s.

An economic recession, a teachers' strike due to a pensions' reform and some corruption scandals made President José María Figueres' government highly unpopular. Thus, government endorsed candidate José Miguel Corrales tried to distance himself from Figueres as much as possible. Corrales won over former President of Congress Jorge Walter Coto Molina in PLN's primaries but the discovery of voter fraud damaged PLN's image and split the party. On the contrary in the PUSC, previous candidate Miguel Ángel Rodríguez was seen as the natural nominee for this election, and despite the fact that deputy Luis Fishman was rumored as a possible internal opponent, he finally declined and Rodríguez was nominated without the need of primaries, thus keeping the party united. During Figueres' administration the so call Figueres-Calderón Pact was signed between the leaders of the two main parties (and sons of the two caudillos of the 1948 civil war); him and former president Rafael Ángel Calderón Fournier (Rodríguez political rival) to approve several mutually beneficial laws for both major parties, something that caused outrage among large segments of the population and started the downfall of the two-party system.

== Results ==
Candidate	Party	Votes	%
Miguel Ángel Rodríguez	Social Christian Unity Party	652,160	46.96
José Miguel Corrales Bolaños	National Liberation Party	618,834	44.56
Vladimir de la Cruz	Democratic Force	41,710	3.00
Walter Muñoz Céspedes	National Integration Party	19,934	1.44
Sherman Thomas Jackson	Costa Rican Renewal Party	19,313	1.39
Álvaro González Espinoza	Democratic Party	12,952	0.93
Federico Malavassi Calvo	Libertarian Movement	5,874	0.42
Jorge González Martén	National Independent Party	4,218	0.30
Alejandro Madrigal Benavides	Christian National Alliance Party	3,545	0.26
Norma Vargas Duarte	United People	3,075	0.22
Rodrigo Gutiérrez Schwanhauser	New Democratic Party	3,025	0.22
Marina Volio Brenes	National Rescue Party	2,681	0.19
Yolanda Gutiérrez Ventura	Independent Party	1,377	0.10
Total		1,388,698	100.00
Valid votes		1,388,698	96.98
Invalid votes		36,318	2.54
Blank votes		6,897	0.48
Total votes		1,431,913	100.00
Registered voters/turnout		2,045,980	69.99
Source: Election Resources

=== By province ===
Province	Rodríguez %	Corrales %	de la Cruz %	Muñoz %	Thomas %	González %	Malavassi %	Other %
San José	42.94	46.72	3.33	2.16	1.81	1.15	0.58	1.31
Alajuela	46.86	45.67	3.13	0.96	1.21	0.92	0.30	0.95
Cartago	44.35	47.69	3.16	1.37	0.81	0.99	0.29	1.34
Heredia	43.39	46.35	3.45	1.63	2.12	1.41	0.35	1.30
Guanacaste	55.63	40.61	1.76	0.30	0.58	0.14	0.15	0.83
Puntarenas	56.23	38.57	1.88	0.47	0.52	0.26	0.40	1.67
Limón	59.58	32.18	2.62	0.88	1.51	0.63	0.54	2.06
Total	46.96	44.56	3.00	1.44	1.39	0.93	0.42	1.30

=== Parliament ===
The country was for the time still under a heavy two-party system dynamic and the two main parties at the time; National Liberation Party and Social Christian Unity Party won most of the votes. Nevertheless, some third forces also won seats on the Parliament, among them left-wing Democratic Force won two seats. It was also the first time that the Libertarian Movement and Christian conservative Costa Rican Renewal won seats (one each) in the Parliament, both for their future presidential candidates Otto Guevara and Justo Orozco respectively. The small party National Integration Party led by medic Walter Muñoz won its only seat in history until the 2018 election.

Party	Votes	%	Seats	+/–
Social Christian Unity Party	569,792	41.18	27	+2
National Liberation Party	481,933	34.83	23	–5
Democratic Force	79,826	5.77	3	+1
Libertarian Movement	42,640	3.08	1	New
National Integration Party	38,408	2.78	1	New
Costa Rican Renewal Party	27,892	2.02	1	New
Democratic Party	17,060	1.23	0	New
Agrarian Labour Action Party	16,955	1.23	1	+1
United People	15,028	1.09	0	0
National Independent Party	12,794	0.92	0	0
General Union Party	12,583	0.91	0	0
New Democratic Party	12,476	0.90	0	New
National Rescue Party	9,588	0.69	0	New
Christian National Alliance Party	9,176	0.66	0	0
National Agrarian Party	7,497	0.54	0	–1
Cartago Agrarian Union Party	7,138	0.52	0	–1
Alajuelense Democratic Action	6,614	0.48	0	0
Independent Party	6,025	0.44	0	0
Change Now	2,223	0.16	0	New
National Convergence Party	2,197	0.16	0	0
Authentic Limonense Party	2,167	0.16	0	0
Cartago Agrarian Force Party	1,892	0.14	0	New
Independent Guanacaste Party	1,623	0.12	0	0
Total	1,383,527	100.00	57	0
Valid votes	1,383,527	96.71		
Invalid votes	32,709	2.29		
Blank votes	14,343	1.00		
Total votes	1,430,579	100.00		
Registered voters/turnout	2,045,980	69.92		
Source: Election Resources

==== By province ====
Province	PUSC		PLN		FD		ML		PIN		PRC		PD		PU		Others	
Province	%	S	%	S	%	S	%	S	%	S	%	S	%	S	%	S	%	S
San José	37.60	8	36.21	8	7.31	2	4.64	1	4.69	1	2.44	1	1.60	0	0.88	0	4.63	0
Alajuela	40.89	4	35.52	4	5.20	1	1.40	0	1.30	0	1.38	0	1.08	0	0.41	0	12.82	1
Cartago	39.39	3	36.49	3	5.14	0	1.71	0	2.08	0	0.97	0	1.15	0	1.75	0	11.32	0
Heredia	39.20	3	35.85	2	7.12	0	2.45	0	3.22	0	2.48	0	1.76	0	1.12	0	6.80	0
Guanacaste	50.05	3	33.66	2	4.19	0	1.08	0	0.55	0	3.10	0	0.21	0	0.62	0	6.54	0
Puntarenas	50.50	4	32.42	2	3.05	0	3.95	0	0.97	0	1.16	0	0.70	0	1.60	0	5.65	0
Limón	47.71	2	24.30	2	2.70	0	3.29	0	1.11	0	2.49	0	0.74	0	2.88	0	14.78	0
Total	41.18	27	34.83	23	5.77	3	3.08	1	2.78	1	2.02	1	1.23	0	1.09	0	8.02	1

=== Local governments ===
Party	Votes	%	Seats			
Party	Votes	%	Alderpeople	+/–	Municipal syndics	+/–
Social Christian Unity Party	564,531	40.87	271	+39	295	+190
National Liberation Party	488,870	35.39	226	–43	145	–178
Democratic Force	85,313	6.18	24	+2	0	0
Libertarian Movement	33,544	2.43	4	New	0	New
Costa Rican Renewal Party	25,654	1.86	0	New	0	New
National Integration Party	23,896	1.73	3	New	0	New
Democratic Party	19,204	1.39	0	New	0	New
Agrarian Labour Action Party	15,157	1.10	7	+7	2	+2
National Independent Party	14,975	1.08	2	+2	0	0
General Union Party	13,378	0.97	3	–1	0	0
New Democratic Party	12,804	0.93	2	New	0	New
United People	12,216	0.88	1	+1	0	0
National Rescue Party	11,385	0.82	2	New	0	New
Escazu's Progressive Yoke	9,699	0.70	4	New	3	New
Independent Party	8,095	0.59	3	+3	0	0
National Agrarian Party	7,827	0.57	5	–2	0	0
21st Century Curridabat	5,117	0.37	2	New	1	New
National Convergence Party	4,044	0.29	1	+1	0	0
Alajuelense Democratic Action	4,027	0.29	1	–2	0	0
Party of the Sun	3,628	0.26	2	New	2	New
Christian National Alliance Party	2,787	0.20	0	0	0	0
Independent Guanacaste Party	2,610	0.19	2	0	0	0
Cartago Agrarian Force Party	2,430	0.18	0	New	0	New
Authentic Limonense Party	1,871	0.14	1	0	0	0
Humanist Party of Montes de Oca	1,870	0.14	1	New	0	New
Change Now	1,790	0.13	0	New	0	New
Independent Belemite Party	1,386	0.10	1	New	0	New
New Alajuelita Party	1,350	0.10	1	0	0	0
Humanist Party of Heredia	1,128	0.08	0	New	0	New
Golfitenean Action Party	694	0.05	0	New	0	New
Total	1,381,280	100.00	569	+34	448	+19
Valid votes	1,381,280	96.55				
Invalid/blank votes	49,341	3.45				
Total votes	1,430,621	100.00				
Registered voters/turnout	2,045,173	69.95				
Source: TSE
