= Eugenio Padilla Bonilla =

Costa Rican politician

Eugenio Padilla Bonilla (born San Jerónimo de Grecia, February 22, 1955) is a Costa Rican politician. He held the position of the mayor of Naranjo from 2007 to 2011. Later, he became the president of the Provincial Assembly of Alajuela of the National Integration Party, for a period starting from 2017 to 2021.
