= 2002 Costa Rican general election =

- 3 February 2002 (first round); 7 April 2002 (second round)
- Presidential election
- Registered: 2,279,851
- Turnout: 68.84% (first round) ▼1.15pp 60.22% (second round)
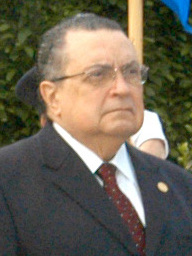

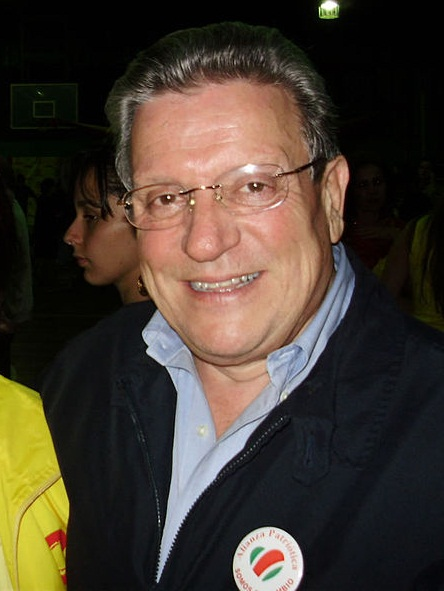
Nominee	Abel Pacheco	Rolando Araya
Party	PUSC	PLN
Running mate	Lineth Saborío; Luis Fishman	Fernando Naranjo; Sandra Piszk
Popular vote	776,278	563,202
Percentage	57.95%	42.05%
- Pacheco: 30–40% 40–50% 50–60% 60–70% 70–80% 80–90% Araya: 30–40% 40–50% 50–60% 60–70% 70-80% Solís: 30-40% 40–50% Tie: 30-40% 40–50%
President before election
Miguel Ángel Rodríguez
PUSC
Elected President
Abel Pacheco
PUSC
- Legislative election
- All 57 seats in the Legislative Assembly; 29 seats needed for a majority
- Turnout: 68.84% (▼1.08pp)
Party	Leader	Vote %	Seats	+/–
PUSC	Abel Pacheco	29.78	19	−8
PLN	Rolando Araya Monge	27.10	17	−6
PAC	Ottón Solís	21.96	14	New
PML	Otto Guevara	9.34	6	+5
PRC	Justo Orozco	3.59	1	0
This lists parties that won seats. See the complete results below.
Results by province

General elections were held in Costa Rica on 3 February 2002. For the first time in the country's history, no candidate in the presidential election passed the 40% threshold. This meant a second round of voting had to be held on 7 April which saw Abel Pacheco of the Social Christian Unity Party defeat the National Liberation Party's Rolando Araya Monge.

Many analysts consider this election the beginning of the end of Costa Rica's decades-long two party system. For the first time in many years alternative political forces become relevant in the Parliament and the plenary had three large party groups; PUSC (19), PLN (17) and PAC (14).

While PUSC won the presidential election and the majority in Congress, PLN became the primal opposition force in Parliament. Centre-left PAC with a progressive platform seemed to have gravely affected traditional third forces at the left of the spectrum like Democratic Force, which failed to win any seat on that election. The right-wing Libertarian Movement also increased its representation from one to six deputies while the conservative Costa Rican Renewal Party retained its one seat.

It was the first time in Costa Rica an evangelical Christian party, the Christian National Alliance, nominated a Catholic, biologist and professor Marvin Calvo Montoya, as its presidential candidate. It was also the last presidential election of the Christian National Alliance.

Despite the close contest, voter turnout was only 69% on 3 February, the lowest since the 1958 elections. For the second round of the presidential elections it fell to 60%, the lowest since 1949.

== Background ==
Before the election, the country's Supreme Electoral Tribinal attempted to make several reforms to the electoral system. These included allowing independents to run in local elections, using electronic voting machines, allowing Costa Ricans living abroad to vote, and allowing voters to choose the top two places on parliamentary lists. However, the changes were rejected by the Legislative Assembly, which noted that independent candidature was incompatible with the constitution, and that electronic voting could not be guaranteed to be secure or transparent.

== Results ==
=== President ===
Candidate	Party	First round		Second round	
Candidate	Party	Votes	%	Votes	%
Abel Pacheco	Social Christian Unity Party	590,277	38.58	776,278	57.95
Rolando Araya Monge	National Liberation Party	475,030	31.05	563,202	42.05
Ottón Solís	Citizens' Action Party	400,681	26.19		
Otto Guevara	Libertarian Movement	25,815	1.69		
Justo Orozco Álvarez	Costa Rican Renewal Party	16,404	1.07		
Walter Muñoz Céspedes	National Integration Party	6,235	0.41		
Vladimir de la Cruz	Democratic Force	4,121	0.27		
Jorge Walter Coto Molina	Coalition Change 2000	3,970	0.26		
Rolando Angulo Zeledón	General Union Party	2,655	0.17		
Daniel Reynolds Vargas	National Patriotic Party	1,680	0.11		
Marvin Calvo Montoya	Christian National Alliance Party	1,271	0.08		
José Hine García	National Rescue Party	905	0.06		
Pablo Galo Angulo Casasola	Independent Workers' Party	801	0.05		
Total		1,529,845	100.00	1,339,480	100.00
Valid votes		1,529,845	97.48	1,339,480	97.56
Invalid votes		32,332	2.06	27,457	2.00
Blank votes		7,241	0.46	6,006	0.44
Total votes		1,569,418	100.00	1,372,943	100.00
Registered voters/turnout		2,279,851	68.84	2,279,851	60.22
Source: Election Resources

==== By province ====
First round

Province %	PUSC %	PLN %	PAC %	ML %	PRC %	PIN %	FD %	Other %
San José	36.6	28.5	31.1	1.6	0.8	0.6	0.2	0.7
Alajuela	37.8	34.1	24.7	1.4	0.9	0.3	0.2	0.6
Cartago	35.4	31.8	28.4	1.9	0.7	0.5	0.4	1.0
Heredia	36.1	26.8	33.2	1.6	1.1	0.4	0.2	0.7
Puntarenas	45.0	33.8	15.8	2.5	1.7	0.2	0.3	0.9
Limón	48.6	28.4	14.9	2.8	3.1	0.3	0.4	1.5
Guanacaste	44.3	40.6	12.1	0.9	1.2	0.2	0.2	0.8
Total	38.6	31.1	26.2	1.7	1.1	0.4	0.3	0.9

Second round

Province	PUSC %	PLN %
San José	57.7	42.3
Alajuela	56.1	43.9
Cartago	55.6	44.4
Heredia	58.1	41.9
Puntarenas	59.7	40.3
Limón	67.0	33.0
Guanacaste	57.1	42.9
Total	58.0	42.0

=== Parliament ===
Party	Votes	%	Seats	+/–
Social Christian Unity Party	453,201	29.78	19	–8
National Liberation Party	412,383	27.10	17	–6
Citizens' Action Party	334,162	21.96	14	New
Libertarian Movement	142,152	9.34	6	+5
Costa Rican Renewal Party	54,699	3.59	1	0
Democratic Force	30,172	1.98	0	–3
National Integration Party	26,084	1.71	0	–1
Coalition Change 2000	12,992	0.85	0	New
Agrarian Labour Action Party	10,890	0.72	0	–1
Independent Workers' Party	8,044	0.53	0	New
National Patriotic Party	7,123	0.47	0	New
Cartago Agrarian Union Party	6,974	0.46	0	0
Christian National Alliance Party	6,825	0.45	0	New
General Union Party	5,883	0.39	0	0
National Rescue Party	4,937	0.32	0	0
National Agrarian Party	2,595	0.17	0	New
Cartago Agrarian Force Party	1,390	0.09	0	New
National Convergence Party	1,348	0.09	0	0
Total	1,521,854	100.00	57	0
Valid votes	1,521,854	96.97		
Invalid votes	28,461	1.81		
Blank votes	19,023	1.21		
Total votes	1,569,338	100.00		
Registered voters/turnout	2,279,851	68.84		
Source: Election Resources

==== By constituency ====
Constituency	PUSC		PLN		PAC		ML		PRC		FD		PIN		Other	
Constituency	%	S	%	S	%	S	%	S	%	S	%	S	%	S	%	S
San José	27.1	6	24.2	5	27.0	6	11.8	2	3.6	1	1.7	0	1.8	0	2.8	0
Alajuela	30.2	4	30.5	4	20.7	2	7.5	1	2.8	0	1.3	0	1.4	0	5.4	0
Cartago	25.7	2	25.4	2	20.8	2	7.3	1	2.0	0	3.7	0	4.5	0	10.4	0
Heredia	27.5	1	24.3	1	27.6	2	10.7	1	3.5	0	2.3	0	1.0	0	3.0	0
Puntarenas	37.8	2	29.8	1	12.9	1	10.0	1	4.2	0	1.8	0	0.4	0	3.2	0
Limón	37.3	2	26.2	2	12.7	1	8.1	1	5.6	0	2.7	0	0.8	0	9.4	0
Guanacaste	37.9	2	39.1	2	10.3	0	2.8	0	6.2	0	1.2	0	0.4	0	2.2	0
Total	29.8	19	27.1	17	22.0	14	9.3	6	3.6	1	2.0	0	1.7	0	4.6	0

== See also ==
- 2002 Costa Rican municipal elections
