= Coalition Change 2000 =

- Founded: 2000
- Dissolved: Post-2002
- Political position: Left-wing

Party flag

Coalition Change 2000 (Spanish: Coalición Cambio 2000) was a political alliance in Costa Rica formed by the Alajuelense Democratic Action and United People.

In the 2002 elections it failed to win a seat, whilst its candidate in the presidential election, Walter Coto Molina received only 0.2% of the vote. The coalition has since disappeared.
