= Independent Guanacaste Party =

Party flag

The Independent Guanacaste Party (Spanish: Partido Guanacaste Independiente') was a political party in Guanacaste Province, Costa Rica. Its president was José Angel Jara Chavarría, and the General Secretary Luis Eduardo (Chito) Arata Herrero.

The party was founded in 1989 and first contested general elections in 1994. However, it received only 0.2% of the vote and failed to win a seat. In the 1998 elections it received just 0.1% of the vote and remained without parliamentary representation.

In 2010 the party was officially declared as "cancelled" by the Tribunal Supremo de Elecciones.
