= 1994 Costa Rican general election =

- 6 February 1994
- Presidential election
- Registered: 1,881,348
- Turnout: 81.11% (▼0.70pp)
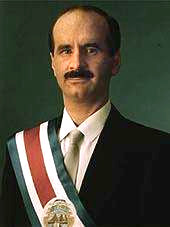

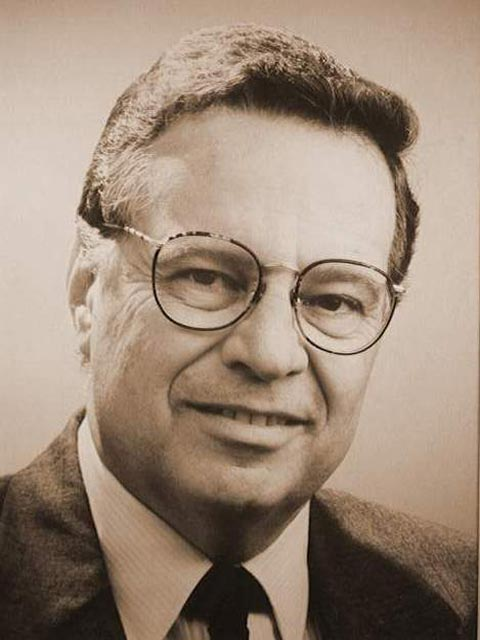
Nominee	José María Figueres	Miguel Ángel Rodríguez
Party	PLN	PUSC
Running mate	Rodrigo Oreamuno; Rebeca Grynspan	Abel Pacheco; Mabel Nieto
Popular vote	739,339	711,328
Percentage	49.62%	47.74%
- Results by district Figueres: 40–50% 50–60% 60–70% 70-80% 80-90% Rodríguez: 40–50% 50–60% 60–70%
President before election
Rafael Ángel Calderón Fournier
PUSC
Elected President
José María Figueres
PLN
- Legislative election
- All 57 seats in the Legislative Assembly; 29 seats needed for a majority
- Turnout: 81.09% (▼0.70pp)
Party	Leader	Vote %	Seats	+/–
PLN	José María Figueres	44.61	28	+3
PUSC	Miguel Ángel Rodríguez	40.38	25	−4
PFD	Vladimir de la Cruz	5.32	2	+2
PUAC	Juan Guillermo Brenes	1.11	1	0
PAN	Víctor Hugo Núñez Torres	0.92	1	+1
This lists parties that won seats. See the complete results below.
Results by province

General elections were held in Costa Rica on 6 February 1994. José María Figueres of the National Liberation Party won the presidential election, whilst his party also won the parliamentary election. Voter turnout was 81%.

== Campaign ==
The primary election were the main focus of controversy during the campaign, as they were particularly negative. In the case of the Social Christian Unity Party (PUSC), Miguel Ángel Rodríguez Echeverría made a second attempt to earn the nomination running against José Joaquín Trejos Fonseca, son of former president José Joaquín Trejos Fernández. The campaign was very ideological with Trejos accusing Rodríguez of not really being Christian Democrat nor following the ideals of Christian socialism and instead being neoliberal. Rodríguez indeed acknowledged to follow classical liberalism and advocated for small government, but without completely abandoning Christian Democracy's ideas.

The PLN's primary was more focused on personal attacks. In it José María Figueres Olsen, son of PLN's caudillo and former president José Figueres Ferrer, faced popular anti-corruption and anti-narcotraffic deputy José Miguel Corrales, alongside other candidates like former First Lady Margarita Penón (wife of Óscar Arias) and San José Mayor Rolando Araya (nephew of former president Luis Alberto Monge). Thus, most candidates except Corrales came from important political families. Figueres' image was affected by the "Chemise Case", the allegations that he was involved in the murder of a young drug dealer while in custody during one of his father's governments. Figueres sued the authors of the book accusing him, and won, but the controversy was still used by Corrales in campaign, to no avail as Figueres won the primary election. Corrales did not support him afterward.

The negative campaign continued after the primaries. Rodríguez used the "Chemise Case" too and also accused Figueres of not being Catholic and belonging to the Christian Science movement, of having a military upraising due to his father's past as revolutionary caudillo and the fact that he's a West Point graduate, etc., in order to cause fear of an authoritarian government. Figueres campaign on the other hand tried to show Rodríguez as a cold, heartless entrepreneur with neoliberal ideas as a counterpart to Figueres social-democratic ideology.

== Results ==
=== President ===
Candidate	Party	Votes	%
José María Figueres	National Liberation Party	739,339	49.62
Miguel Ángel Rodríguez	Social Christian Unity Party	711,328	47.74
Miguel Zúñiga Díaz	Democratic Force	28,274	1.90
Rafael Ángel Matamoros	Christian National Alliance Party	4,980	0.33
Jorge González Martén	National Independent Party	2,426	0.16
Norma Vargas Duarte	General Union Party	2,150	0.14
Holman Esquivel Garrote	Independent Party	1,600	0.11
Total		1,490,097	100.00
Valid votes		1,490,097	97.65
Invalid votes		30,663	2.01
Blank votes		5,219	0.34
Total votes		1,525,979	100.00
Registered voters/turnout		1,881,348	81.11
Source: Election Resources

==== By province ====
Province	Figueres %	Rodríguez%	Zúñiga %	Matamoros %	González %	Vargas %	Esquivel %
San José	49.63	47.29	2.39	0.28	0.16	0.17	0.08
Alajuela	50.30	47.41	1.71	0.29	0.13	0.08	0.09
Cartago	50.33	46.81	2.03	0.35	0.20	0.16	0.12
Heredia	49.89	46.91	2.57	0.27	0.14	0.13	0.08
Guanacaste	50.03	48.66	0.62	0.26	0.14	0.08	0.20
Puntarenas	49.06	49.09	0.75	0.59	0.19	0.21	0.12
Limón	46.26	51.27	1.26	0.56	0.23	0.17	0.25
Total	49.62	47.74	1.90	0.33	0.16	0.14	0.11

=== Legislative Assembly ===
Party	Votes	%	Seats	+/–
National Liberation Party	658,258	44.61	28	+3
Social Christian Unity Party	595,802	40.38	25	–4
Democratic Force	78,454	5.32	2	+2
General Union Party	25,420	1.72	0	–1
Christian National Alliance Party	21,064	1.43	0	0
People's Vanguard Party	20,026	1.36	0	0
Cartago Agrarian Union Party	16,336	1.11	1	0
National Agrarian Party	13,589	0.92	1	+1
National Independent Party	12,767	0.87	0	0
Alajuelense Democratic Action	11,630	0.79	0	0
Independent Party	9,213	0.62	0	0
Authentic Limonense Party	5,468	0.37	0	0
Agrarian Labour Action Party	3,859	0.26	0	0
Independent Guanacaste Party	2,843	0.19	0	New
National Convergence Party	864	0.06	0	New
Total	1,475,593	100.00	57	0
Valid votes	1,475,593	96.72		
Invalid votes	33,702	2.21		
Blank votes	16,329	1.07		
Total votes	1,525,624	100.00		
Registered voters/turnout	1,881,348	81.09		
Source: Election Resources

==== By province ====
Province	PLN		PUSC		FD		PUGEN		ANC		PVP		PNI		Others	
Province	%	S	%	S	%	S	%	S	%	S	%	S	%	S	%	S
San José	44.21	10	39.76	9	8.30	2	2.34	0	1.53	0	1.84	0	1.50	0	0.52	0
Alajuela	46.36	5	41.26	5	3.43	0	0.40	0	1.15	0	0.62	0	0.35	0	6.43	0
Cartago	43.93	3	37.73	2	3.39	0	2.47	0	0.88	0	0.66	0	0.61	0	10.33	1
Heredia	45.93	3	40.93	2	7.86	0	1.73	0	1.18	0	1.28	0	0.51	0	0.58	0
Guanacaste	47.23	3	44.02	2	1.88	0	0.73	0	0.61	0	-	-	0.43	0	5.09	0
Puntarenas	45.81	3	43.63	3	1.85	0	2.49	0	3.33	0	2.04	0	0.55	0	0.30	0
Limón	36.85	1	37.14	2	0.96	0	0.46	0	1.28	0	2.51	0	0.36	0	20.44	1
Total	44.61	28	40.38	25	5.32	2	1.72	0	1.43	0	1.36	0	0.87	0	4.31	2

=== Local governments ===
Party	Votes	%	Seats			
Party	Votes	%	Alderpeople	+/–	Municipal syndics	+/–
National Liberation Party	684,648	46.36	269	+37	323	+162
Social Christian Unity Party	612,918	41.51	232	–42	105	–160
Democratic Force	72,412	4.90	22	+22	0	0
General Union Party	24,148	1.64	4	0	0	0
People's Vanguard Party	19,069	1.29	2	New	0	New
National Agrarian Party	16,667	1.13	7	+5	0	0
Alajuelense Democratic Action	11,549	0.78	3	+3	0	0
National Independent Party	8,717	0.59	0	0	0	0
Independent Party	6,036	0.41	1	0	0	0
Agrarian Labour Action Party	4,979	0.34	0	–3	0	New
Independent Guanacaste Party	4,878	0.33	2	New	0	New
Authentic Limonense Party	4,534	0.31	1	0	0	0
National Convergence Party	3,563	0.24	0	New	0	New
New Alajuelita Party	2,584	0.17	1	0	0	0
Total	1,476,702	100.00	544	+18	428	+2
Valid votes	1,476,702	96.78				
Invalid/blank votes	49,170	3.22				
Total votes	1,525,872	100.00				
Registered voters/turnout	1,691,689	90.20				
Source: TSE
