= National Integration Party (Costa Rica) =

National Integration Party Partido Integración Nacional
- President: Dr. Walter Muñoz Cespedes
- Secretary-General: Marta Floribeth Cordero Rivera
- Treasurer: Róger Bejarano Morejón
- First vice president: Raúl Ernesto Bermúdez Jiménez
- Second vice president: Vivian González Trejos
- Founded: 30 January 1996
- Headquarters: Imagenes medicas building, 2nd floor, Calderon Guardia Square, San José
- Ideology: Social conservatism Economic nationalism Right-wing populism Participative democracy
- Political position: Right-wing
- Colors: Light blue, blue

Website
- Official website

The National Integration Party (Spanish: Partido Integración Nacional) is a political party in Costa Rica. The party mainly endorses perennial candidate Dr. Walter Muñoz Céspedes, a San Jose medical doctor and five-time presidential candidate, normally with about 1% or less of the vote. In the 2018 election, it endorsed the candidacy of former minister and defense lawyer Juan Diego Castro reaching 9% of the vote, although Castro and the party angrily split pathways soon after the election.

The party first contested general elections in 1998, in which it won a single seat, taken by Walter Muñoz Céspedes, who was also their candidate in the presidential election, where he finished fourth with 1.4%. However, the party lost its seat in the 2002 elections in which it received 1.7% of the vote. In the presidential election that year Muñoz finished sixth with just 0.4%. In the 2010 elections the party received only 0.8% of the vote and remained without parliamentary representation, whilst Muñoz won just 0.17% of the vote in the presidential elections. In that election, the party's vice-presidential candidate was the historic leftist leader and professor Álvaro Montero Mejía. However, two weeks before the election, the party stopped its campaign and endorsed Otton Solís, from Citizens' Action Party, in an effort to build a progressive alliance against Laura Chinchilla, candidate of the National Liberation Party. For the 2014 election, Muñoz was, again, both presidential and legislative candidate gaining around 3,000 votes (0.21%), the least voted candidate in that election. In 2016 Costa Rican municipal elections, the party won the position of syndic of the district of Santa Cruz for its candidate Arcadio Carrera. In 2020 Costa Rican municipal elections, Carrera ran for Mayor of Santa Cruz. Incumbent Vicemayor of Golfito, Hannia Herra, elected originally by the National Liberation Party in 2016 election, joined the party and is also a candidate for Mayor of Golfito for 2020. Carrera and Herra's platforms are mainly seen as progressive and even leftist, opposing domination of beach areas by big resorts in their respective cantons.

According to Muñoz, the party opposes taxes, immigration, same-sex marriage and same-sex civil unions, and it also supports a public monopoly of fuel distribution. The party supports state control of prices for medicine, which are unregulated in Costa Rica. It also has opposed reductions of the public healthcare budget for combating cancer. One of the party's congresswomen, Patricia Villegas, is especially known for her efforts on modernizing national laws on HIV, in order to promote the human rights of HIV positive people.

== Notable members ==
- Marvin Calvo Montoya
- Eugenio Padilla Bonilla

== Electoral performance ==
=== Presidential ===
Election	Candidate	First round				Second round			
Election	Candidate	Votes	%	Position	Result	Votes	%	Position	Result
1998	Walter Muñoz Céspedes	19,934	1.44%	4th	Lost	—N/a			
2002	Walter Muñoz Céspedes	6,235	0.41%	▼6th	Lost	—N/a			
2006	Walter Muñoz Céspedes	5,136	0.32%	▼9th	Lost	—N/a			
2010	Walter Muñoz Céspedes	3,198	0.17%	9th	Lost	—N/a			
2014	Walter Muñoz Céspedes	3,042	0.15%	▼13th	Lost	—N/a			
2018	Juan Diego Castro	205,602	9.54%	▲5th	Lost	—N/a			
2022	Walter Muñoz Céspedes	3,022	0.14%	▼21st	Lost	—N/a			
2026	Luis Amador Jiménez	3,873	0.15%	▲13th	Lost	—N/a			

=== Parliamentary ===
Election	Leader	Votes	%	Seats	+/–	Position	Government
1998	Walter Muñoz Céspedes	38,408	2.78%	1 / 57	New	5th	Opposition
2002	Walter Muñoz Céspedes	26,084	1.71%	0 / 57	▼1	▼7th	Extra-parliamentary
2006	Walter Muñoz Céspedes	12,945	0.80%	0 / 57	0	▼14th	Extra-parliamentary
2010	Walter Muñoz Céspedes	14,643	0.76%	0 / 57	0	▲10th	Extra-parliamentary
2014	Walter Muñoz Céspedes	11,307	0.55%	0 / 57	0	▼14th	Extra-parliamentary
2018	Walter Muñoz Céspedes	163,933	7.67%	4 / 57	▲4	▲5th	Opposition
2022	Walter Muñoz Céspedes	22,710	1.09%	0 / 57	▼4	▼15th	Extra-parliamentary
2026	Walter Muñoz Céspedes	7,295	0.29%	0 / 57	0	▼17th	Extra-parliamentary
