= Libertarian Movement (Costa Rica) =

Political party in Costa Rica

Libertarian Movement Party Partido Movimiento Libertario
- Founder: Otto Guevara
- Founded: May 1994
- Ideology: Libertarian conservatism Social conservatism Economic liberalism
- Political position: Right-wing
- Colours: Red

The Libertarian Movement Party (Spanish: Partido Movimiento Libertario; PML) is a political party based on libertarian conservatism in Costa Rica. It was founded in May 1994. After an important protagonism during early 2000s with its perennial nominee Otto Guevara among the main candidates and reaching third place in 2006 and 2010, it was affected by several corruption scandals and lack of funds, the party gradually suffered a debacle in 2014 ending in fourth on the presidential ticket, and fifth in Parliament. Later losing all its mayors in the mid-term local election of 2016, to finally having bad results in 2018 with Guevara's candidacy reaching only 1% of support and losing all seats in Congress.

== History ==
Founded by non-partisan liberals from the Academy and liberal defectors of Social Christian Unity Party, contested the 1998 election with Federico Malavassi as candidate receiving only 0.4% of the vote but succeeding in getting attorney Otto Guevara elected as member of the Legislative Assembly. In this time the party was strongly libertarian and was in favor of minimal government (something quite polemic in a welfare state like Costa Rica when even the right-wing parties as the Social Christians tend to accept social programs and government intervention), legalization of recreational drugs, same-sex marriage, abortion and the like.

In 2002, Guevara unsuccessfully ran for president (winning 1.7% of the vote); at the legislative elections, the party won 9.3% of the popular vote and six out of 57 seats. A few weeks after taking office, one Congressman left the party and became independent, leaving PML with five seats. In 2006, Guevara again unsuccessfullyran for president (winning 8.4% of the vote); at the legislative elections, the party won 9.1% of the popular vote and six out of 57 seats. Evangelical pastor Fernando Alexis Castillo Villanueva endorsed the party in this period. In the 2010 general election, Guevara was again the PML's presidential candidate and received 20% of the popular vote; it also increased its number of deputies to nine (even so three of these deputies defects from the party before the end of the legislative period). At the municipal level the party obtain one mayor in 2006 and two in 2010.

In its 2014 electoral campaign, the party took a more socially conservative position, totally opposing the legalisation of abortion and rejecting homosexual couples' right to a marriage license.

The party suffered a debacle in the 2014 election, as was relegated to fourth place after PAC, PLN and FA parties. It also reduced its congressional representation to less than half (four seats), It was aldo unable to elect any mayor in the 2016 mid-term municipal election. This electoral debacle was also costly, as the party was unable to pay some of its campaign debts to both workers, Social Security, loaners and Banks. As previously, in 2015 another deputy defects; Carmen Quesada, who declares herself independent.

Also in 2015, several party members went to trial after being accused of fraud by the State, apparently trying to trick the Electoral Tribunal in paying for trainings that were already cover by the Friedrich Naumann Foundation. Judges sentenced party's vice president, treasurer and accountant to eight years in prison.

For the 2018 general election, the party held the first primary election in their history, due to there being more than one member aspiring for the party's nomination for the presidency. The two pre-candidates were Otto Guevara, running for the fifth time, this time under a right-wing populist tone, inspired by the campaigns of Donald Trump. The other candidate was Natalia Díaz, a young, first-time deputy, who promised, if elected, she'll bring a new face to the party and renew its structure and administration. Guevara won with 59.49% of the votes.

Due to previous fraud allegations against the party, Otto Guevara's campaign had difficulty finding a bank willing to give the party a loan for campaigning. This changed on January 20, when Promérica Bank loaned the party 500 million colones for the purpose of financing their electoral campaign. In November 2019 Guevara announced the foundation of a new political party named Liberal Union as the Libertarian Movement is unable to pay its debts.

In 2019, Guevara announced that the party would not take part in elections anymore and that a new formation would be founded named Liberal Union.

The party's candidacy was taken originally by credit tycoon Carlos Valenciano Kamer, however he resign soon after arguing health issues. The candidacy was then taken by former president of the Arias Foundation Luis Alberto Cordero Arias receiving only a little more than 3,000 votes and being the least voted candidate of all 25 in that election.

== Policy positions ==
The political party generally has a moderately libertarian perspective on policy issues, although sometimes policy proposals on social issues are more conservative, than libertarian, i.e. a legislator introduced legislation that would have banned same-sex couples from adopting or having custody of children.

During the 2014 campaign, the party expressed opposition to abortion and same-sex marriage, although congressman and presidential candidate Otto Guevara has since said that his major concern about legalizing gay marriage is that the debate over such libertarian legislation would distract the nation from more important matters.

On most policy issues, the party favors moderate libertarian reforms such as:

- Moderate intervention of the State in health, education, infrastructure and other areas
- Break up of all of the state-owned monopolies and eliminate legal barriers on private economic activities
- Provide a low flat tax for the income produced within the country, eliminate many of the current taxes
- Free trade – eliminate tariffs and barriers to the entry of goods
- Freedom to choose the currency that consenting individuals want
- Freedom to choose your own doctor within the social security system
- Strengthen individual pension accounts
- Freedom of parents to choose schools through vouchers
- Respect for private property
- Reduction of the participation of government in the economy
- Freedom of speech and press
- Transfer of responsibility from central government to local
- Strengthening of immigration, particularly from Nicaraguans

== Electoral performance ==
=== Presidential ===
Election	Candidate	First round				Second round			
Election	Candidate	Votes	%	Position	Result	Votes	%	Position	Result
1998	Federico Malavassi	5,874	0.42%	7th	Lost	—N/a			
2002	Otto Guevara	25,815	1.69%	▲4th	Lost	—N/a			
2006	Otto Guevara	137,710	8.48%	▲3rd	Lost	—N/a			
2010	Otto Guevara	384,540	20.83%	3rd	Lost	—N/a			
2014	Otto Guevara	233,064	11.34%	▼4th	Lost	—N/a			
2018	Otto Guevara	21,890	1.02%	▼7th	Lost	—N/a			
2022	Luis Alberto Cordero Arias	1,406	0.07%	▼26th	Lost	—N/a			

=== Parliamentary ===
Election	Leader	Votes	%	Seats	+/–	Position	Government
1998	Federico Malavassi	42,640	3.1%	1 / 57	New	4th	Opposition
2002	Otto Guevara	142,152	9.3%	6 / 57	▲5	4th	Opposition
2006	Otto Guevara	147,934	9.2%	6 / 57	0	▲3rd	Opposition
2010	Otto Guevara	275,518	14.5%	9 / 57	▲3	3rd	Opposition
2014	Otto Guevara	162,559	7.9%	4 / 57	▼5	▼5th	Opposition
2018	Otto Guevara	49,659	2.3%	0 / 57	▼4	▼9th	Extra-parliamentary
2022	Luis Alberto Cordero Arias	13,473	0.7%	0 / 57	0	▼19th	Extra-parliamentary
