= Democratic Force (Costa Rica) =

Political party in Costa Rica (1992–2010)

Democratic Force Fuerza Democrática
- President: Marco Núñez González
- Secretary-General: Vladimir de la Cruz de Lemos
- Founded: 21 November 1992; 33 years ago
- Dissolved: 18 March 2010; 16 years ago
- Merger of: Party of Progress; Humanist Party of Costa Rica; United People (faction)
- Succeeded by: Broad Front (Not legal successor)
- Ideology: Participatory democracy Democratic socialism Humanism
- Political position: Left-wing
- Colors: Orange
- Slogan: ¡Métale un naranjazo al Bipartidismo! ('Give the two-party system a good whack!')

Party flag

Democratic Force (Spanish: Fuerza Democrática, FD) was a democratic socialist political party in Costa Rica that existed from 1992 to 2010. During the 1990s, it emerged as the country's principal left-wing electoral force and the largest third party outside the dominant two-party system of the National Liberation Party and the Social Christian Unity Party, which it strongly criticized.

The party was founded in 1992 by lawyer Gerardo Trejos Salas and a coalition of left-wing politicians, academics, intellectuals, and former communist student leaders. It inherited the organizational structure of the Progress Party, which had nominated poet Isaac Felipe Azofeifa as its presidential candidate in the 1990 general election. The party became popularly known as El Naranjazo ("The Big Orange"), a nickname derived from the color of its flag and its campaign anthem of the same name.

In the 1994 general election, Democratic Force won two seats in the Legislative Assembly. Its presidential candidate, television personality and folklorist Miguel Zúñiga Díaz, better known as Miguel Salguero, finished third with 1.9% of the vote. The party reached its greatest electoral success in the 1998 election, when it increased its legislative representation to three seats. Its presidential nominee, historian and University of Costa Rica professor Vladimir de la Cruz, again placed third with 3% of the vote.

The party entered a period of decline following the establishment of the Citizens' Action Party (PAC) in 2000, led by Ottón Solís. The PAC attracted much of the anti-establishment and centre-left electorate that had previously supported Democratic Force. Internal divisions further weakened the party. Although it received approximately 2% of the vote in the 2002 Costa Rican general election, it lost all of its seats in the Legislative Assembly, while Vladimir de la Cruz finished seventh in the presidential election with 0.3% of the vote.

Democratic Force was dissolved in 2010. Many of its former members joined other political parties. Former deputy Alberto Salom Echeverría joined the Citizens' Action Party, while former deputy José Merino del Río and his adviser José María Villalta Flórez-Estrada became leading members of the Broad Front.

== Electoral performance ==
=== Presidential ===
Election	Candidate	First round			
Election	Candidate	Votes	%	Position	Result
1994	Miguel Zúñiga Díaz	28,274	1.90%	3rd	Lost
1998	Vladimir de la Cruz de Lemos	41,710	3.00%	3rd	Lost
2002	Vladimir de la Cruz de Lemos	4,121	0.27%	▼7th	Lost
2006	Vladimir de la Cruz de Lemos	3,020	0.19%	▼11th	Lost

=== Parliamentary ===
Election	Leader	Votes	%	Seats	+/–	Position	Government
1994	Miguel Zúñiga Díaz	78,454	5.32%	2 / 57	New	3rd	Opposition
1998	Vladimir de la Cruz de Lemos	79,826	5.77%	3 / 57	▲1	3rd	Opposition
2002	Vladimir de la Cruz de Lemos	30,172	24.71%	0 / 57	▼3	▼6th	Extra-parliamentary
2006	Vladimir de la Cruz de Lemos	13,675	0.85%	0 / 57	0	▼13th	Extra-parliamentary
