= National Rescue Party =

National Rescue Party Partido Rescate Nacional
- Founded: 27 July 1996
- Dissolved: 17 March 2010
- Ideology: Democratic socialism
- Political position: Center-left

Party flag

The National Rescue Party (Spanish: Partido Rescate Nacional) is a political party in Costa Rica.

The party first contested general elections in 1998, but received only 0.7% of the vote and failed to win a seat. In 2002, they received only 0.3% of the vote, whilst José Hine García, the party's presidential candidate, finished last with 0.01%. In the 2006 elections, support for the party did not allow it to win a single seat. It did not contest the 2010 elections.
