= Union for Change Party =

Former Costa Rican political party

Flag of the Union for Change Party

The Union for Change Party (Partido Unión para el Cambio) was a political party in Costa Rica founded by the former minister and congressman Antonio Álvarez Desanti after he left the National Liberation Party unhappy with his faction's results in the internal elections against Óscar Arias. Desanti was the party's presidential nominee.

In the 2006 general elections, it won 2.4% of the legislative votes and 2.44% of the Presidential vote. It was unable to win any seats in the legislature gaining only one single municipal councilor. The party disbanded in March 2010.
