= Agrarian Labour Action Party =

Agrarian Labour Action Party Partido Acción Laborista Agrícola
- Abbreviation: PALA
- President: Guido Octavio Vargas Artavia
- Founded: 18 May 1989
- Dissolved: 22 February 2007
- Preceded by: PUPA
- Headquarters: Alajuela
- Ideology: Agrarianism

Party flag

The Agricultural Labour Action Party (Spanish: Partido Acción Laborista Agrícola) was a political party in Costa Rica.

The party was founded after the end of the Agrarian Politics Union Party. The first general elections contested by the party were in 1990, in which it received only 0.4% of the vote, and failed to win a seat. In 1994 its vote share dropped to 0.3%, again failing to win a seat. In 1998, its electoral performance improved, as it received 1.2% of the national vote and winning its first seat. However, in 2002, its vote share dropped to 0.7% and it lost its parliamentary representation.
