= Homeland First Party =

Costa Rica political party

Homeland First Party Partido Patria Primero
- President: Juan José Vargas Fallas
- Founded: October 24th, 2004
- Dissolved: March 18th, 2010
- Split from: Citizens' Action Party
- Ideology: Political Catholicism; Conservatism; Nationalism
- Political position: Right-wing to Far-right
- Colours: Black, and Green

Party flag

The Homeland First Party (Partido Patria Primero) was a political party in Costa Rica. Funded by PAC’s dissident and motivational speaker Juan José Vargas. The party contested the 2006 general elections with Juan José Vargas as presidential candidate and former professional soccer player Evaristo Coronado as deputy candidate. They gain 1.6% of the legislative votes, and 1.1% of the Presidential vote unable to win any seats in the legislature. The party disbanded in March, 2010.
