= List of deputies of Costa Rica, 2014–2018 =

The 17th Legislative Assembly of Costa Rica since the current 1949 Constitution met from 1 May 2014 till 30 April 2018 in the Cuesta de Moras' Building in San José.

== Members ==
Deputies 2014–2018
Constituency	Party	Deputy	District	Major	Religion
San Jose
San Jose	Citizens' Action Party	Ottón Solís Fallas	1st	Economy	Roman Catholic
San Jose	Citizens' Action Party	Epsy Campbell Barr	2nd	Economy	Protestant
San Jose	Citizens' Action Party	Marcela Guerrero Campos	3rd	Political science	Roman Catholic
San Jose	Independent (originally from Citizens' Action Party)	Víctor Morales Zapata	4th	Business administration	Roman Catholic
San Jose	Citizens' Action Party	Marvin Atencio Delgado	5th	Medicine and Law	Roman Catholic
San Jose	National Liberation Party	Antonio Álvarez Desanti	6th	Entrepreneur	Roman Catholic
San Jose	National Liberation Party	Sandra Piszk Feinzilber	7th	Political science	Jewish
San Jose	National Liberation Party	Carlos Manuel Arguedas Ramírez	8th	Law	Roman Catholic
San Jose	National Liberation Party	Maureen Cecilia Clarke Clarke	9th	Law	Protestant
San Jose	National Liberation Party	Juan Luis Jiménez Succar	10th	Law	Roman Catholic
San Jose	Broad Front	Patricia Mora Castellanos	11th	Sociology	Atheist
San Jose	Broad Front	Jorge Arguedas Mora	12th	Technician in Telecommunication	
San Jose	Social Christian Unity Party	Humberto Vargas Corrales	13th		Roman Catholic
San Jose	Social Christian Unity Party	Rosibel Ramos Madrigal	14th	Administration	Roman Catholic
San Jose	Libertarian Movement	Otto Guevara Guth	15th	Law	Roman Catholic
San Jose	Libertarian Movement	Natalia Díaz Quintana	16th	Business administration	Roman Catholic
San Jose	Accessibility without Exclusion	Óscar Andrés López Arias	17th	Self-taught	Evangelical Christian
San Jose	National Restoration	Fabricio Alvarado Muñoz	18th	Journalist, singer, TV and radio host	Evangelical Christian
San Jose	Costa Rican Renewal Party	Gonzalo Alberto Ramírez Zamora	19th	Law	Evangelical Christian
Alajuela
Alajuela	National Liberation Party	Rolando González Ulloa	1st	Education	Roman Catholic
Alajuela	National Liberation Party	Aracelli Segura Retana	2nd		Roman Catholic
Alajuela	National Liberation Party	Michael Jake Arce Sancho	3rd	Law	Roman Catholic
Alajuela	National Liberation Party	Silvia Vanessa Sánchez Venegas	4th	Business administration	Roman Catholic
Alajuela	Citizens' Action Party	Javier Cambronero Arguedas	5th	Education	Roman Catholic
Alajuela	Citizens' Action Party	Nidia Jiménez Vásquez	6th	History	Roman Catholic
Alajuela	Citizens' Action Party	Franklin Corella Vargas	7th	Education	Roman Catholic
Alajuela	Broad Front	Edgardo Araya Sibaja	8th	Law	
Alajuela	Broad Front	Ligia Fallas Rodríguez	9th	Education	
Alajuela	Social Christian Unity Party	Rafael Ortiz Fábrega	10th		Roman Catholic
Alajuela	Libertarian Movement	José Alberto Alfaro Jiménez	11th	Law	Roman Catholic
Cartago
Cartago	National Liberation Party	Paulina María Ramírez Portuguez	1st	Accountant	Roman Catholic
Cartago	National Liberation Party	Julio Antonio Rojas Astorga	2nd	Agronomics	Roman Catholic
Cartago	Citizens' Action Party	Emilia Molina Cruz	3rd		Roman Catholic
Cartago	Citizens' Action Party	Marco Vinicio Redondo Quirós	4th	Business administration	Roman Catholic
Cartago	Broad Front	José Francisco Camacho Leiva	5th	Entrepreneur	
Cartago	Social Christian Unity Party	Jorge Rodríguez Araya	6th	Construction worker	Roman Catholic
Cartago	Christian Democratic Alliance	Mario Redondo Poveda	7th	Law	Evangelical Christian
Heredia
Heredia	Citizens' Action Party	Henry Mora Jiménez	1st	Economy	
Heredia	Citizens' Action Party	Marlene Madrigal Flores	2nd	Entrepreneur	Roman Catholic
Heredia	National Liberation Party	Ronny Monge Salas	3rd	Law	Roman Catholic
Heredia	National Liberation Party	Lorelly Trejos Salas	4th	Law	Roman Catholic
Heredia	Broad Front	José Antonio Ramírez Aguilar	5th	Project management	
Heredia	Social Christian Unity Party	William Alvarado Bogantes	6th		Roman Catholic
Guanacaste
Guanacaste	National Liberation Party	Juan Rafael Marín Quirós	1st	Business administration	Roman Catholic
Guanacaste	National Liberation Party	Marta Arabela Arauz Mora	2nd	Law	Roman Catholic
Guanacaste	Broad Front	Ronal Vargas Araya	3rd	Catholic priest	Roman Catholic
Guanacaste	Social Christian Unity Party	Johnny Leiva Badilla	4th		Roman Catholic
Puntarenas
Puntarenas	National Liberation Party	Karla Vanessa Prendas Matarrita	1st	Psychology	Roman Catholic
Puntarenas	National Liberation Party	Olivier Ibo Jiménez Rojas	2nd		Roman Catholic
Puntarenas	Social Christian Unity Party	Gerardo Vargas Rojas	3rd	Law	Roman Catholic
Puntarenas	Broad Front	Carlos Hernández Álvarez	4th	Education	
Puntarenas	Citizens' Action Party	Laura María Garro Sánchez	5th	Business administration	Roman Catholic
Limon
Limon	National Liberation Party	Danny Hayling Carcache	1st	Entrepreneur	Roman Catholic
Limon	Broad Front	Gerardo Vargas Varela	2nd	Catholic priest	Roman Catholic
Limon	Social Christian Unity Party	Luis Alberto Vásquez Castro	3rd		Roman Catholic
Limon	Independent (originally from Libertarian Movement)	Carmen Quesada Santamaría	4th	Education	Roman Catholic
Limon	Costa Rican Renewal Party	Avelino Esquivel Quesada	5th	Christian Pastor	Evangelical Christian
