= 2014 Costa Rican general election =

- 2 February 2014 (first round); 6 April 2014 (second round)
- Presidential election
- Registered: 3,065,667 (first round); 3,078,321 (second round)
- Turnout: 68.48% (first round) ▼0.64pp 56.50% (second round)
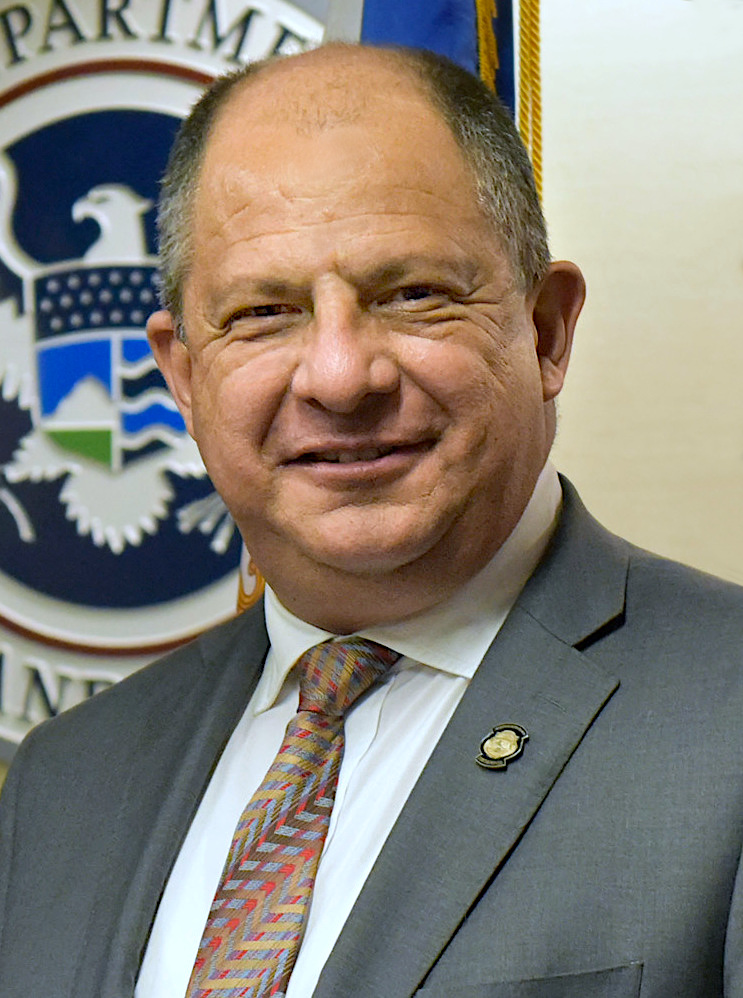

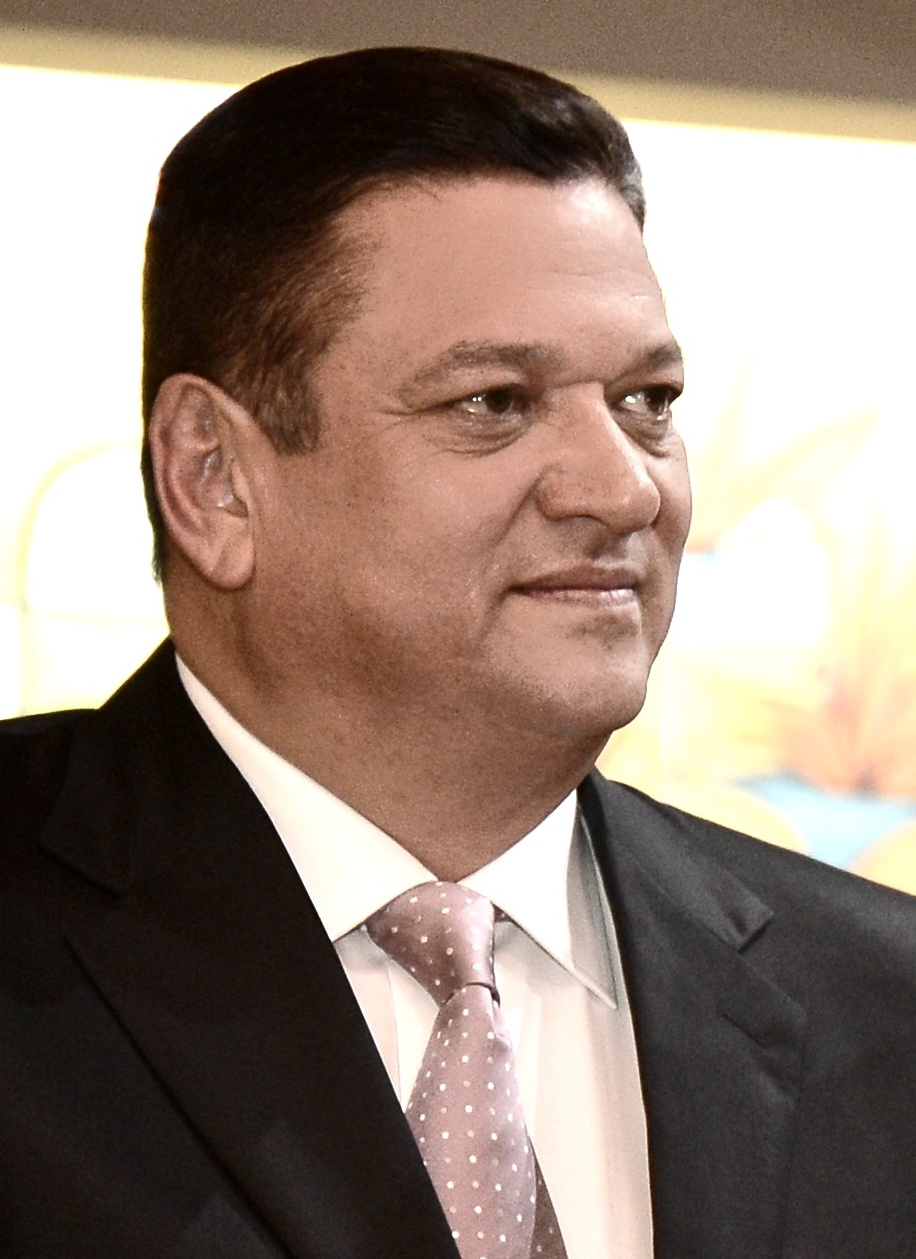
Nominee	Luis Guillermo Solís	Johnny Araya
Party	PAC	PLN
Running mate	Helio Fallas; Ana Helena Chacón	Jorge Pattoni; Silvia Lara
Popular vote	1,338,321	374,844
Percentage	77.77%	22.23%
- Solís: 20-30% 30-40% 40–50% 50–60% 60–70% 70–80% 80–90% 90–100% Araya: 20-30% 30-40% 40–50% 50–60% 60–70% Villalta: 20-30% 30-40% 40–50% Guevara: 20-30% Piza: 20-30% Tie: 20-30% 30-40%
President before election
Laura Chinchilla
PLN
Elected President
Luis Guillermo Solís
PAC
- Legislative election
- All 57 seats in the Legislative Assembly; 29 seats needed for a majority
- Turnout: 68.38% (▼0.74pp)
Party	Leader	Vote %	Seats	+/–
PLN	Johnny Araya Monge	25.71	18	−6
PAC	Luis Guillermo Solís Rivera	23.48	13	+2
FA	José María Villalta Flórez-Estrada	13.14	9	+8
PUSC	Rodolfo Piza Rocafort	10.02	8	+2
PML	Otto Guevara Guth	7.94	4	−5
PRC	Justo Orozco Álvarez	4.11	2	+1
PREN	Carlos Avendaño Calvo	4.06	1	0
PASE	Óscar López Arias	3.97	1	−3
ADC	Mario Redondo Poveda	1.17	1	New
This lists parties that won seats. See the complete results below.
Results by province

General elections were held in Costa Rica on Sunday, 2 February 2014 to elect a new president, two vice presidents, and 57 Legislative Assembly lawmakers. In accordance with Article 132 of the constitution, incumbent President Laura Chinchilla Miranda was ineligible to run for a second consecutive term.

The ruling National Liberation Party (PLN) put forward San José Mayor Johnny Araya Monge as its presidential candidate; the Libertarian Movement party nominated former legislator Otto Guevara Guth; the leftist Broad Front nominated José María Villalta Flórez-Estrada; and the center-left Citizens' Action Party nominated Luis Guillermo Solís Rivera.

Opinion polls in December 2013 showed Araya ahead with 37 percent, Villalta close behind at 32 percent, Guevara at 15 percent, and Solís trailing at eight percent, suggesting the likelihood of a run-off vote in February. Villalta's strong showing in the polls caused concern among Araya supporters and business leaders in Costa Rica. La Nacion, Costa Rica's most important newspaper and a historical ally of Liberacion Nacional, began a concerted series of attacks against Villalta, comparing him to Venezuela's Hugo Chávez. Political experts later concluded that this focus on Villalta helped Luis Guillermo Solis in the election.

In the presidential election, Solís and Araya came first and second, respectively, with neither candidate reaching 40 percent of the valid poll in the first round of voting, so a second round of voting was held from 6am to 6pm on 6 April, the first run-off election since 2002.

In a surprise move, Araya announced on 6 March that he would abandon his campaign for the run-off election. He stated that after weighing his chances it was only sensible to withdraw from the campaign. Recent polls had indicated that he was trailing badly behind Solís and he believed that spending money on campaigning was not prudent. Although Araya's action effectively handed the presidency to Solís, the run-off still had to take place since Costa Rican law does not allow for a candidate to withdraw from a run-off election. Ultimately, Solís won the second round with 78 percent of the vote, a historic high in Costa Rica. Unlike the first round, Solís won a majority in every province. He became the first president since 1978 to be elected from a party other than the PLN or PUSC.

== Presidential candidates ==
There were thirteen political parties on the 2014 ballot, each one with their corresponding ticket of a president and two vice-presidents.

Party	President	First Vicepresident	Second Vicepresident
Citizens' Action Party	Luis Guillermo Solís Foreign Ministry's Chief of Staff (1986–1990), Ambassador of Central American Affairs (1994–1998)	Helio Fallas Venegas Minister of Planning (1990–1994), Minister of Housing (2002–2006)	Ana Helena Chacón Vice Minister of Public Safety (2002–2006), Deputy (2006–2010)
National Liberation Party	Johnny Araya Monge San José Mayor (1998- )	Jorge Pattoni General Manager Dos Pino's Corporation (1992–2013)	Silvia Lara President of Joint Social Welfare Institute (2002–2006)
Broad Front	José María Villalta Flórez-Estrada Deputy (2010–2014)	María Dagmare Facio Fernández	Walter Antillón Montealegre
Libertarian Movement	Otto Guevara Guth Deputy (1998–2002)	Thelmo Vargas Madrigal	Abriel Gordienko López
Social Christian Unity Party	Rodolfo Emilio Piza de Rocafort Executive President of the Costa Rican Social Security Fund (1998–2002)	Carlos Eduardo Araya Guillén	Patricia Vega Herrera
New Homeland Party	José Miguel Corrales Bolaños Deputy (2002–2006)	Lizbeth Dora Quesada Tristán	Óscar Aguilar Bulgarelli
National Restoration Party	Carlos Luis Avendaño Calvo	Rose Mary Zúñiga Ramírez	Pablo Josué Chaves Illanes
Costa Rican Renewal Party	Justo Orozco Álvarez	Ana Dinorah Rodríguez Rojas	Rafael Ángel Matamoros Mesén
Accessibility without Exclusion Party Party (PASE)	Óscar Andrés López Arias	Zulema Villalta Bolaños	Marvin Alberto Marín Zúñiga
New Generation Party	Sergio Mena Díaz	Luz Mary Alpízar Loaiza	Carlos Francisco Moreno Bustos
Workers' Party (PT)	Héctor Enrique Monestel Herrera	Jessica Barquero Barrantes	Greivis González López
National Advance Party	José Manuel Echandi Meza	Carmen Lidia Pérez Ramírez	Gabriel Zamora Márquez
National Integration Party	Walter Muñoz Céspedes	Vivian González Trejos	Rodrigo Arguedas Cortés

== Opinion polls ==
If no candidate surmounts the 40% threshold, the two candidates who would qualify for the runoff are marked. No poll accurately predicted the first or second round voting results.

View source data.

Date	Pollster	Johnny Araya (PLN)	Otto Guevara (ML)	Rodolfo Piza (R. Hernández before October 2013) (PUSC)	L.G. Solís (PAC)	J.M. Villalta (FA)	Others
Aug 2013	Borge y Asociados	52%	9.7%	23%	8.2%	3.5%	
Aug 2013	CIEP	20.2%	1.4%	12.4%	4.1%	4.5%	
Sep 2013	Unimer	27.5%	9.7%	10.6%	4.4%	19%	26%
Oct 2013	CIEP	24%	9.9%	3%	4%	9.7%	1.3%
Nov 2013	Borge y Asociados	26%	16%	4%	4%	19%	26%
Nov 2013	Cid Gallup	45%	15%	8%	10%	21%	
Dec 2013	Unimer	19%	19%	5%	8%	22%	11%
Dec 2013	CIEP	17%	10%	3%	5%	15%	1%
Dec 2013	Cid Gallup	37%	15%	5%	9%	32%	
14 Jan 2014	Cid Gallup	39%	18%	5%	7%	26%	
16 Jan 2014	Unimer	20.3%	20.2%	3.6%	5.4%	22.2%	5.8%
21 Jan 2014	CIEP	20.4%	11.2%	3.1%	9.5%	15.3%	4.6%
28 Jan 2014	Cid Gallup	35.6%	17.6%	6.5%	15.6%	21%	3.8%
28 Jan 2014	CIEP	17.4%	7.3%	3.4%	11.6%	14.4%	

== Results ==
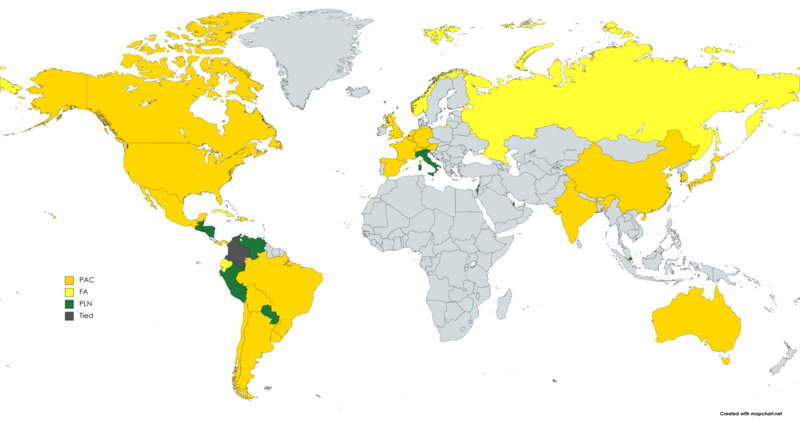
Results of vote overseas, gold PAC, green PLN and yellow FA.

=== President ===
The results of the first-round final count were declared on 17 February 2014, with the results of the second-round eighth count being declared on 7 April 2014:

Candidate	Party	First round		Second round	
Candidate	Party	Votes	%	Votes	%
Luis Guillermo Solís	Citizens' Action Party	629,866	30.64	1,338,321	77.77
Johnny Araya Monge	National Liberation Party	610,634	29.71	382,600	22.23
José María Villalta Flórez-Estrada	Broad Front	354,479	17.25		
Otto Guevara	Libertarian Movement	233,064	11.34		
Rodolfo Piza Rocafort	Social Christian Unity Party	123,653	6.02		
José Miguel Corrales Bolaños	New Fatherland Party	30,816	1.50		
Carlos Avendaño	National Restoration Party	27,691	1.35		
Justo Orozco	Costa Rican Renewal Party	16,721	0.81		
Óscar López	Accessibility without Exclusion Party	10,339	0.50		
Sergio Mena	New Generation Party	5,882	0.29		
Héctor Monestel	Workers' Party	4,897	0.24		
José Echand	National Advance Party	4,388	0.21		
Walter Muñoz	National Integration Party	3,042	0.15		
Total		2,055,472	100.00	1,720,921	100.00
Valid votes		2,055,472	97.92	1,720,921	98.95
Invalid/blank votes		43,747	2.08	18,314	1.05
Total votes		2,099,219	100.00	1,739,235	100.00
Registered voters/turnout		3,065,667	68.48	3,078,321	56.50
Source: Election Resources

==== By province ====
First round

Province %	PAC %	PLN %	FA %	ML %	PUSC %	PPN %	PREN %	Other %
San José	36.2	28.5	15.2	10.0	5.3	1.4	1.4	1.9
Alajuela	31.1	29.8	18.3	10.4	5.4	2.1	1.1	1.8
Cartago	34.8	27.8	14.7	11.4	6.3	2.1	0.9	1.9
Heredia	38.6	25.8	16.5	9.8	1.2	1.2	1.6	5.3
Puntarenas	14.1	34.4	23.2	14.6	8.5	0.7	2.0	2.6
Limón	14.6	29.2	22.2	18.1	7.7	0.8	1.9	5.6
Guanacaste	14.9	40.8	19.1	12.8	7.8	0.9	1.3	2.5
Total	30.6	29.7	17.3	11.3	6.1	1.5	1.4	2.2

Second round

Province	PAC %	PLN %
San José	77.6	22.3
Alajuela	78.9	21.1
Cartago	80.3	19.6
Heredia	80.8	19.1
Puntarenas	73.1	26.8
Limón	77.5	22.4
Guanacaste	69.7	30.2
Total	77.8	22.1

=== Legislative Assembly ===
Although Solís' PAC received the most votes in the presidential elections, the party did not win in the parliamentary voting making PLN the largest party in the Assembly with 18 deputies over PAC's 13.

Leftist party Broad Front surprised with its results, achieving 9 seats, first time ever that the Left achieved such a big number. Social Christian Unity Party recovered part of its former influence by turning into the fourth political party in legislative size even when its candidate Rodolfo Piza was fifth in the presidential vote. The opposite happened to Otto Guevara’s right-wing Libertarian Movement, fourth in presidential votes, which stood fifth in legislative elections, and as a result, the number of its deputies was reduced from 9 to 4. Oscar Lopez’s PASE party also suffered a diminishment in number of deputies from 4 to 1 (Lopez himself).

Three Christian parties, oriented toward the Protestant minority and very socially conservative, also achieved deputies: Costa Rican Renewal Party 2, National Restoration 1 and Christian Democratic Alliance 1.

Party	Votes	%	Seats	+/–
National Liberation Party	526,531	25.71	18	–6
Citizens' Action Party	480,969	23.48	13	+2
Broad Front	269,178	13.14	9	+8
Social Christian Unity Party	205,247	10.02	8	+2
Libertarian Movement	162,559	7.94	4	–5
National Restoration Party	84,265	4.11	1	0
Costa Rican Renewal Party	83,083	4.06	2	+1
Accessibility without Exclusion Party	81,291	3.97	1	–3
New Fatherland Party	42,234	2.06	0	New
New Generation Party	25,060	1.22	0	New
Christian Democratic Alliance	23,886	1.17	1	New
National Advance Party	19,895	0.97	0	New
Workers' Party	12,998	0.63	0	0
National Integration Party	11,307	0.55	0	0
Transporters' Party	5,639	0.28	0	New
Patriotic Alliance	4,853	0.24	0	0
Viva Puntarenas Party	4,417	0.22	0	New
Green Party	2,148	0.10	0	New
Homel, Equality and Dem. Party of Puntarenas	1,376	0.07	0	New
Homeland, Equality and Democracy Party	1,088	0.05	0	New
New Socialist Party	277	0.01	0	New
Total	2,048,301	100.00	57	0
Valid votes	2,048,301	97.72		
Invalid/blank votes	47,854	2.28		
Total votes	2,096,155	100.00		
Registered voters/turnout	3,065,667	68.38		
Source: Election Resources

==== By constituency ====
Constituency	PLN		PAC		FA		PUSC		ML		PREN		PRC		PASE		PPN		PNG		Other	
Constituency	%	S	%	S	%	S	%	S	%	S	%	S	%	S	%	S	%	S	%	S	%	S
San José	23.5	5	27.2	5	12.1	2	8.8	2	7.5	2	5.3	1	3.9	1	4.2	1	2.0	0	1.8	0	3.5	0
Alajuela	27.4	4	25.2	3	14.0	2	8.3	1	7.7	1	3.2	0	4.0	0	4.1	0	3.0	0	0.8	0	2.4	0
Cartago	24.4	2	23.5	2	11.1	1	10.7	1	7.1	0	2.4	0	1.5	0	4.6	0	2.2	0	0.9	0	11.6	1
Heredia	23.9	2	31.5	2	12.7	1	9.1	1	7.6	0	4.7	0	2.4	0	3.9	0	1.6	0	1.0	0	1.6	0
Puntarenas	28.5	2	12.8	1	14.8	1	15.3	1	9.0	0	4.2	0	3.3	0	3.9	0	0.9	0	1.3	0	5.9	0
Limón	26.0	1	10.5	0	15.9	1	11.4	1	10.6	1	3.2	0	12.6	1	3.6	0	0.9	0	0.9	0	4.4	0
Guanacaste	34.6	2	11.5	0	16.0	1	14.0	1	9.0	0	3.5	0	4.6	0	1.6	0	2.4	0	0.5	0	2.2	0
Total	25.7	18	23.5	13	13.1	9	10.0	8	7.9	4	4.1	1	3.9	2	3.9	1	2.1	0	1.2	0	4.4	1

==== Candidates elected ====
Fifty-seven legislators were elected and took office on 1 May 2014, eleven of whom had been members of the Legislative Assembly in the past. Five were from the National Liberation Party: Antonio Álvarez Desanti, Juan Luis Jiménez, Olivier Jiménez, Rolando González, and Sandra Piszk. Two were from the Citizen Action Party: Epsy Campbell and Ottón Solís. Mario Redondo of the Christian Democratic Alliance served previously with the Social Christian Unity Party. The others were Otto Guevara of the Libertarian Movement Party, Oscar López of Accessibility without Exclusion Party, and Jorge Rodríguez of the Social Christian Unity Party. The full list is as follows:

Constituency	Cédula	Candidate	Party
San José	104300205	Ottón Solís Fallas	PAC
San José	106070983	Epsy Campbell Barr	PAC
San José	104990698	Víctor Hugo Morales Zapata	PAC
San José	108460152	Marcela Guerrero Campos	PAC
San José	601780481	Ruperto Marvin Atencio Delgado	PAC
San José	104890842	Antonio Álvarez Desanti	PLN
San José	103570156	Sara Ángela Piszk Feinzilber	PLN
San José	400850902	Carlos Manuel Arguedas Ramírez	PLN
San José	700490709	Maureen Cecilia Clarke Clarke	PLN
San José	202751177	Juan Luis Jiménez Succar	PLN
San José	104710261	Ana Patricia Mora Castellanos	FA
San José	104110109	Jorge Arturo Arguedas Mora	FA
San José	105270922	Humberto Vargas Corrales	PUSC
San José	106730022	Rosibel Ramos Madrigal	PUSC
San José	105440893	Otto Guevara Guth	PML
San José	112260846	Natalia Díaz Quintana	PML
San José	108820284	Gerardo Fabricio Alvarado Muñoz	PRN
San José	107890915	Óscar Andrés López Arias	PASE
San José	108910592	Gonzalo Alberto Ramírez Zamora	PRC
Alajuela	202740540	Rolando González Ulloa	PLN
Alajuela	202700539	Aracelli Segura Retana	PLN
Alajuela	109780035	Michael Jake Arce Sancho	PLN
Alajuela	206470280	Silvia Vanessa Sánchez Venegas	PLN
Alajuela	204060127	Javier Francisco Cambronero Arguedas	PAC
Alajuela	900500822	Nidia María Jiménez Vásquez	PAC
Alajuela	110350156	Franklin Corella Vargas	PAC
Alajuela	204830663	Edgardo Vinicio Araya Sibaja	FA
Alajuela	203440441	Ligia Elena Fallas Rodríguez	FA
Alajuela	104410073	Rafael Ángel Ortiz Fábrega	PUSC
Alajuela	106730801	José Alberto Alfaro Jiménez	PML
Cartago	302880372	Paulina María Ramírez Portuguez	PLN
Cartago	302350106	Julio Antonio Rojas Astorga	PLN
Cartago	104110201	Emilia Molina Cruz	PAC
Cartago	106670558	Marco Vinicio Redondo Quirós	PAC
Cartago	302990664	José Francisco Camacho Leiva	FA
Cartago	301940611	Jorge Rodríguez Araya	PUSC
Cartago	105890526	Mario Redondo Poveda	ADC
Heredia	105120548	Henry Mora Jiménez	PAC
Heredia	204740785	Marlene Madrigal Flores	PAC
Heredia	108490121	Rony Monge Salas	PLN
Heredia	401300696	Lorelly Trejos Salas	PLN
Heredia	401470385	José Antonio Ramírez Aguilar	FA
Heredia	401300350	William Alvarado Bogantes	PUSC
Guanacaste	106070406	Juan Rafael Marín Quirós	PLN
Guanacaste	501880832	Marta Arabela Arauz Mora	PLN
Guanacaste	204240362	Ronal Vargas Araya	FA
Guanacaste	502950673	Johnny Leiva Badilla	PUSC
Puntarenas	503090116	Karla Vanessa Prendas Matarrita	PLN
Puntarenas	202820663	Olivier Ibo Jiménez Rojas	PLN
Puntarenas	110230742	Gerardo Vargas Rojas	PUSC
Puntarenas	502560320	Carlos Enrique Hernández Álvarez	FA
Puntarenas	104160452	Laura María Garro Sánchez	PAC
Limón	900840835	Danny Hayling Carcache	PLN
Limón	302420343	Gerardo Vargas Varela	FA
Limón	502170327	Abelino Esquivel Quesada	PRC
Limón	107880624	Luis Alberto Vásquez Castro	PUSC
Limón	303050502	Carmen Quesada Santamaría	PML
