= Alajuela (Legislative Assembly constituency) =

Constituency in Costa Rica

- Constituency for the Legislative Assembly of Costa Rica
- Location of Alajuela within Costa Rica
- Province: Alajuela
- Population: 1,035,464 (2022)
- Electorate: 679,844 (2022)
- Area: 9,772 km^{2} (2024)

Current Constituency
- Created: 1949
- Seats: List: 11 (2002–present); 10 (1966–2002); 11 (1962–1966); 8 (1953–1962); 10 (1949–1953)
- Deputies: List: Dinorah Barquero Barquero (PLN); Leslye Rubén Bojorges León (PUSC); José Joaquín Hernández Rojas (PLN); Olga Lidia Morera Arrieta (PNR); María Marta Padilla Bonilla (Ind); Jorge Antonio Rojas López (PPSD); María Daniela Rojas Salas (PUSC); Monserrat Ruiz Guevara (PLN); José Pablo Sibaja Jiménez (PNR); Luis Diego Vargas Rodríguez (Ind); Priscilla Vindas Salazar (FA)

Alajuela is one of the seven multi-member constituencies of the Legislative Assembly, the national legislature of Costa Rica. The constituency was established in 1949 when the Legislative Assembly was established by the modified constitution imposed by the Figueres dictatorship. It is conterminous with the province of Alajuela. The constituency currently elects 11 of the 57 members of the Legislative Assembly using the closed party-list proportional representation electoral system. At the 2022 general election it had 679,844 registered electors.

== Electoral system ==
Alajuela currently elects 11 of the 57 members of the Legislative Assembly using the closed party-list proportional representation electoral system. Seats are allocated using the largest remainder method using the Hare quota (cociente). Only parties that receive at least 50% of the Hare quota (subcociente) compete for remainder seats. Any seats remaining unfilled after allocation using the quotient system are distributed amongst parties that surpassed the subcociente, is descending order of their total votes in the constituency. The latter process is repeated until all the seats in the constituency are filled.

== Election results ==
=== Summary ===
Election	United People PU / IU / CC2000 / PASO			Broad Front FA			Patriotic Alliance AP / PADA			Citizens' Action PAC			National Republican PRN / PR / PRI / PC			National Liberation PLN / PSD			Social Christian Unity PUSC / CU / PDC			National Unification PUN / PUN			National Integration PIN			Libertarian Movement PML			Social Democratic Progress PPSD			National Restoration PRN		
Election	Votes	%	Seats	Votes	%	Seats	Votes	%	Seats	Votes	%	Seats	Votes	%	Seats	Votes	%	Seats	Votes	%	Seats	Votes	%	Seats	Votes	%	Seats	Votes	%	Seats	Votes	%	Seats	Votes	%	Seats
2022	1,753	0.42%	0	28,645	6.86%	1				7,414	1.78%	0				108,377	25.97%	3	47,434	11.37%	2				6,019	1.44%	0	2,623	0.63%	0	78,496	18.81%	2	6,827	1.64%	0
2018				11,982	2.85%	0				73,436	17.46%	2				91,520	21.76%	3	60,235	14.32%	2				30,612	7.28%	1	6,557	1.56%	0				86,719	20.62%	2
2014				56,012	14.03%	2	2,261	0.57%	0	100,572	25.20%	3				109,409	27.41%	4	32,934	8.25%	1				2,119	0.53%	0	30,661	7.68%	1				12,884	3.23%	0
2010				4,835	1.32%	0	6,922	1.89%	0	72,880	19.94%	2				139,515	38.17%	5	23,746	6.50%	1				1,314	0.36%	0	60,198	16.47%	2						
2006	791	0.26%	0				7,867	2.56%	0	85,277	27.74%	4				114,567	37.27%	5	21,257	6.92%	1				1,397	0.45%	0	24,021	7.81%	1						
2002	1,784	0.62%	0							59,414	20.68%	2				87,534	30.47%	4	86,760	30.20%	4				4,117	1.43%	0	21,535	7.50%	1						
1998	1,043	0.41%	0				6,614	2.59%	0							90,809	35.52%	4	104,547	40.89%	4				3,329	1.30%	0	3,577	1.40%	0						
1994							11,630	4.33%	0							124,538	46.36%	5	110,839	41.26%	5															
1990	3,469	1.43%	0				7,330	3.02%	0							105,608	43.47%	5	113,942	46.90%	5															
1986	2,581	1.23%	0				4,324	2.06%	0							104,726	49.86%	5	88,240	42.01%	5															
1982	5,517	3.25%	0				12,486	7.37%	1							94,080	55.50%	6	51,018	30.10%	3															
1978	6,217	4.24%	0													62,835	42.85%	5	67,698	46.17%	5	6,251	4.26%	0												
1974	2,253	1.92%	0										3,152	2.69%	0	51,895	44.32%	5	955	0.82%	0	29,381	25.09%	3												
1970	2,300	2.41%	0													49,958	52.31%	6	1,326	1.39%	0	36,753	38.49%	4												
1966																37,966	49.22%	5				34,382	44.57%	5												
1962													19,438	28.00%	3	34,910	50.29%	6				11,796	16.99%	2												
1958													6,701	17.05%	2	19,777	50.33%	4				9,519	24.22%	2												
1953																22,770	67.81%	6				1,927	5.74%	0												
1949															1			1						7												

=== Detailed ===
==== 2020s ====
===== 2022 =====
Results of the 2022 general election held on 6 February 2022:

Party		Votes per canton																Total votes	%	Seats
Party		Ala- juela	Atenas	Grecia	Gua- tuso	Los Chiles	Naranjo	Orotina	Pal- mares	Poás	Río Cuarto	San Carlos	San Mateo	San Ramón	Sarchí	Upala	Zarcero	Total votes	%	Seats
National Liberation Party	PLN	33,747	3,218	9,902	2,008	1,511	6,602	2,569	4,433	4,763	1,522	20,843	979	8,357	1,514	3,554	2,855	108,377	25.97%	3
Social Democratic Progress Party	PPSD	22,943	3,478	6,814	794	1,470	4,042	1,259	3,217	2,399	741	17,528	388	9,191	1,093	1,919	1,220	78,496	18.81%	2
Social Christian Unity Party	PUSC	14,013	2,209	5,886	699	759	2,349	1,556	1,692	1,953	358	4,708	439	4,796	1,944	3,296	777	47,434	11.37%	2
New Republic Party	PNR	14,788	1,205	3,479	1,102	1,052	1,986	917	1,290	1,913	504	9,256	216	3,326	883	2,864	331	45,112	10.81%	2
Progressive Liberal Party	PLP	15,208	1,085	3,446	104	98	1,446	632	3,894	1,428	96	4,575	140	3,163	433	411	435	36,594	8.77%	1
Broad Front	FA	9,631	1,192	2,467	137	257	1,681	650	1,794	1,132	130	3,527	211	4,300	595	476	465	28,645	6.86%	1
Social Christian Republican Party	PRSC	2,787	162	503	769	62	246	73	253	386	45	1,590	30	361	64	277	62	7,670	1.84%	0
Citizens' Action Party	PAC	2,281	271	460	73	64	751	87	370	208	59	1,456	25	824	122	285	78	7,414	1.78%	0
National Restoration Party	PRN	2,268	155	453	104	114	276	114	294	236	62	1,734	42	521	104	302	48	6,827	1.64%	0
National Integration Party	PIN	962	137	227	72	97	144	46	336	70	18	903	17	2,746	39	138	67	6,019	1.44%	0
Liberal Union Party	UL	1,333	78	285	44	41	185	49	213	144	25	546	10	1,511	50	103	50	4,667	1.12%	0
A Just Costa Rica	CRJ	919	101	405	86	109	136	78	889	117	28	839	46	600	52	112	31	4,548	1.09%	0
Accessibility without Exclusion	PASE	1,871	129	351	44	26	187	110	169	203	24	544	28	535	75	128	50	4,474	1.07%	0
New Generation Party	PNG	1,531	108	270	35	84	123	169	118	112	24	995	80	388	49	85	53	4,224	1.01%	0
We Are		490	97	196	4	10	232	110	63	97	73	272	115	252	1,685	21	280	3,997	0.96%	0
Costa Rican Social; Democratic Movement	PMSDC	1,092	47	1,402	28	41	148	23	81	83	31	410	18	232	36	78	25	3,775	0.90%	0
National Force Party	PFN	1,101	268	234	30	46	142	113	128	106	84	447	27	249	66	98	42	3,181	0.76%	0
United We Can	UP	860	65	132	38	19	71	36	58	156	19	788	6	303	33	50	58	2,692	0.65%	0
Libertarian Movement	PML	786	67	208	21	30	114	50	126	83	20	284	16	286	465	45	22	2,623	0.63%	0
Christian Democratic Alliance	ADC	494	23	85	33	67	99	28	54	42	19	934	8	180	25	199	21	2,311	0.55%	0
Costa Rican Social Justice Party	JSC	743	106	143	15	55	87	39	99	94	13	316	12	187	27	107	20	2,063	0.49%	0
United People	PU	356	38	700	12	78	35	8	49	36	5	154	4	195	28	34	21	1,753	0.42%	0
Our People Party	PNP	450	54	43	61	27	31	41	50	32	20	408	8	126	37	42	15	1,445	0.35%	0
Workers' Party	PT	360	27	78	6	107	56	17	76	35	10	244	5	172	21	30	23	1,267	0.30%	0
National Encounter Party	PEN	271	21	155	33	19	48	10	43	26	7	187	11	106	22	101	17	1,077	0.26%	0
Costa Rican Democratic Union	PUCD	182	13	55	13	12	20	13	10	13	4	103	0	63	11	90	6	608	0.15%	0
Valid votes		131,467	14,354	38,379	6,365	6,255	21,237	8,797	19,799	15,867	3,941	73,591	2,881	42,970	9,473	14,845	7,072	417,293	100.00%	11
Blank votes		901	88	330	119	111	215	60	184	125	49	672	39	490	90	250	81	3,804	0.89%	
Rejected votes – other		1,255	104	335	114	86	227	101	200	147	49	779	26	475	74	258	67	4,297	1.01%	
Total polled		133,623	14,546	39,044	6,598	6,452	21,679	8,958	20,183	16,139	4,039	75,042	2,946	43,935	9,637	15,353	7,220	425,394	62.57%	
Registered electors		215,738	21,886	56,993	11,919	13,869	33,531	16,820	30,113	23,616	6,780	118,361	5,007	68,598	15,414	31,777	9,422	679,844		
Turnout		61.94%	66.46%	68.51%	55.36%	46.52%	64.65%	53.26%	67.02%	68.34%	59.57%	63.40%	58.84%	64.05%	62.52%	48.31%	76.63%	62.57%		

The following candidates were elected: Dinorah Barquero Barquero (PLN); Leslye Rubén Bojorges León (PUSC); José Joaquín Hernández Rojas (PLN); Olga Lidia Morera Arrieta (PNR); María Marta Padilla Bonilla (PPSD); Jorge Antonio Rojas López (PPSD); María Daniela Rojas Salas (PUSC); Monserrat Ruiz Guevara (PLN); José Pablo Sibaja Jiménez (PNR); Luis Diego Vargas Rodríguez (PLP); and Priscilla Vindas Salazar (FA).

==== 2010s ====
===== 2018 =====
Results of the 2018 general election held on 4 February 2018:

Party		Votes per canton															Total votes	%	Seats
Party		Ala- juela	Atenas	Grecia	Gua- tuso	Los Chiles	Naranjo	Orotina	Pal- mares	Poás	San Carlos	San Mateo	San Ramón	Sarchí	Upala	Zarcero	Total votes	%	Seats
National Liberation Party	PLN	31,298	2,450	7,573	1,667	1,100	4,660	2,399	4,482	3,378	14,456	825	9,705	3,620	1,725	2,182	91,520	21.76%	3
National Restoration Party	PRN	28,939	2,071	8,610	1,848	1,426	2,988	1,769	2,743	2,975	19,343	291	6,798	4,321	1,893	704	86,719	20.62%	2
Citizens' Action Party	PAC	23,361	3,123	7,778	348	640	4,094	1,028	4,364	2,864	11,043	257	10,195	1,535	1,504	1,302	73,436	17.46%	2
Social Christian Unity Party	PUSC	17,266	3,282	5,758	737	1,220	3,719	1,979	4,191	2,211	9,918	897	3,499	2,011	1,998	1,549	60,235	14.32%	2
National Integration Party	PIN	9,692	937	2,721	322	545	1,696	688	1,645	1,076	5,427	165	3,521	992	817	368	30,612	7.28%	1
Social Christian Republican Party	PRSC	5,498	521	2,737	466	345	1,413	403	726	698	3,590	161	2,320	546	489	324	20,237	4.81%	1
Broad Front	FA	3,375	575	1,012	102	237	606	201	971	434	1,975	78	1,584	357	263	212	11,982	2.85%	0
New Generation Party	PNG	2,259	190	955	459	56	299	91	312	322	1,427	22	2,928	352	97	77	9,846	2.34%	0
Accessibility without Exclusion	PASE	3,545	219	600	104	65	238	208	221	716	1,895	38	496	183	131	78	8,737	2.08%	0
Christian Democratic Alliance	ADC	2,259	185	841	145	160	429	148	293	314	1,149	28	537	392	204	70	7,154	1.70%	0
Costa Rican Renewal Party	PRC	1,929	342	575	97	128	1,129	144	265	308	849	118	515	447	131	60	7,037	1.67%	0
Libertarian Movement	PML	2,171	437	500	77	88	267	109	315	240	875	43	831	240	278	86	6,557	1.56%	0
Progressive Liberal Party	PLP	979	63	1,787	15	23	110	21	93	59	268	5	156	55	46	13	3,693	0.88%	0
Workers' Party	PT	683	82	195	22	298	146	45	164	79	482	9	416	85	63	47	2,816	0.67%	0
Valid votes		133,254	14,477	41,642	6,409	6,331	21,794	9,233	20,785	15,674	72,697	2,937	43,501	15,136	9,639	7,072	420,581	100.00%	11
Blank votes		482	77	243	66	61	151	41	130	76	427	17	358	200	62	38	2,429	0.57%	
Rejected votes – other		1,525	152	447	121	104	258	127	260	177	971	39	506	310	105	73	5,175	1.21%	
Total polled		135,261	14,706	42,332	6,596	6,496	22,203	9,401	21,175	15,927	74,095	2,993	44,365	15,646	9,806	7,183	428,185	67.86%	
Registered electors		201,480	20,429	59,285	10,970	12,152	31,782	15,594	28,973	21,821	108,240	4,602	63,586	28,352	14,668	9,056	630,990		
Turnout		67.13%	71.99%	71.40%	60.13%	53.46%	69.86%	60.29%	73.09%	72.99%	68.45%	65.04%	69.77%	55.18%	66.85%	79.32%	67.86%		

The following candidates were elected: Ignacio Alberto Alpízar Castro (PRN); Luis Ramón Carranza Cascante (PAC); Nidia Lorena Céspedes Cisneros (PRN); María José Corrales Chacón (PLN); Dragos Dolanescu Valenciano (PRSC); Carolina Hidalgo Herrera (PAC); Erwen Masís Castro (PUSC); Erick Rodríguez Steller (PIN); María Inés Solís Quirós (PUSC); Roberto Thompson (PLN); and Daniel Isaac Ulate Valenciano (PLN).

===== 2014 =====
Results of the 2014 general election held on 2 February 2014:

Party		Votes per canton															Total votes	%	Seats
Party		Ala- juela	Atenas	Grecia	Gua- tuso	Los Chiles	Naranjo	Orotina	Pal- mares	Poás	San Carlos	San Mateo	San Ramón	Sarchí	Upala	Zarcero	Total votes	%	Seats
National Liberation Party	PLN	31,206	3,227	11,934	2,100	1,473	6,145	3,275	8,148	4,025	18,713	1,187	8,273	4,644	2,254	2,805	109,409	27.41%	4
Citizens' Action Party	PAC	33,479	4,131	11,080	660	700	5,083	1,079	4,815	3,818	15,994	345	14,042	1,543	2,119	1,684	100,572	25.20%	3
Broad Front	FA	16,511	1,925	5,090	650	1,263	3,411	1,085	3,609	1,886	8,356	390	7,586	2,111	1,358	781	56,012	14.03%	2
Social Christian Unity Party	PUSC	10,612	1,284	3,196	922	735	1,790	1,714	934	943	5,216	301	2,054	1,634	959	640	32,934	8.25%	1
Libertarian Movement	PML	10,429	558	2,949	548	574	1,668	442	546	1,465	5,371	200	2,902	1,577	1,150	282	30,661	7.68%	1
Accessibility without Exclusion	PASE	6,959	441	1,357	398	146	536	426	378	744	2,973	59	869	393	297	196	16,172	4.05%	0
Costa Rican Renewal Party	PRC	5,902	1,470	1,162	302	283	588	281	395	527	3,003	79	947	475	311	80	15,805	3.96%	0
National Restoration Party	PRN	5,005	244	1,424	273	242	685	291	867	543	1,363	49	872	377	561	88	12,884	3.23%	0
New Homeland Party	PPN	2,088	208	768	84	275	308	97	465	384	3,963	52	2,942	160	116	174	12,084	3.03%	0
Workers' Party	PT	958	68	208	49	235	183	33	112	102	497	13	387	123	61	32	3,061	0.77%	0
New Generation Party	PNG	1,001	95	245	47	65	116	46	113	84	776	16	255	33	69	43	3,004	0.75%	0
Patriotic Alliance	AP	681	51	107	24	18	42	14	58	52	212	24	180	750	25	23	2,261	0.57%	0
National Advance	PAN	553	39	242	80	53	115	24	59	50	720	6	104	45	55	30	2,175	0.54%	0
National Integration Party	PIN	404	274	116	15	42	717	21	27	59	155	31	113	27	98	20	2,119	0.53%	0
Valid votes		125,788	14,015	39,878	6,152	6,104	21,387	8,828	20,526	14,682	67,312	2,752	41,526	13,892	9,433	6,878	399,153	100.00%	11
Blank votes		575	92	225	67	74	166	57	135	84	421	20	355	210	74	62	2,617	0.64%	
Rejected votes – other		1,897	150	542	153	124	343	122	291	220	964	39	587	360	140	66	5,998	1.47%	
Total polled		128,260	14,257	40,645	6,372	6,302	21,896	9,007	20,952	14,986	68,697	2,811	42,468	14,462	9,647	7,006	407,768	70.61%	
Registered electors		185,688	18,923	55,007	9,919	10,457	29,894	14,116	27,132	19,747	97,702	4,044	58,067	24,597	13,710	8,490	577,493		
Turnout		69.07%	75.34%	73.89%	64.24%	60.27%	73.25%	63.81%	77.22%	75.89%	70.31%	69.51%	73.14%	58.80%	70.36%	82.52%	70.61%		

The following candidates were elected: José Alberto Alfaro Jiménez (PML); Edgardo Araya Sibaja (FA); Michael Jake Arce Sancho (PLN); Javier Cambronero Arguedas (PAC); Franklin Corella Vargas (PAC); Ligia Fallas Rodríguez (FA); Rolando González Ulloa (PLN); Nidia María Jiménez Vásquez (PAC); Rafael Ortiz Fábrega (PUSC); Silvia Vanessa Sánchez Venegas (PLN); and Aracelli Segura Retana (PLN).

===== 2010 =====
Results of the 2010 general election held on 7 February 2010:

Party		Votes per canton															Total votes	%	Seats
Party		Ala- juela	Alfaro Ruiz	Atenas	Grecia	Gua- tuso	Los Chiles	Naranjo	Orotina	Pal- mares	Poás	San Carlos	San Mateo	San Ramón	Upala	Valverde Vega	Total votes	%	Seats
National Liberation Party	PLN	43,565	2,789	4,328	13,860	2,122	2,126	7,505	3,915	6,986	5,316	23,764	1,060	12,914	7,287	1,978	139,515	38.17%	5
Citizens' Action Party	PAC	20,680	1,766	3,136	6,906	688	1,245	4,261	846	4,224	2,075	13,446	234	10,697	1,907	769	72,880	19.94%	2
Libertarian Movement	PML	20,442	588	1,448	5,800	720	1,000	3,721	1,335	2,131	2,758	10,124	471	3,611	1,398	4,651	60,198	16.47%	2
Accessibility without Exclusion	PASE	14,201	335	1,895	3,515	299	254	1,131	642	1,413	1,367	3,003	112	2,180	392	336	31,075	8.50%	1
Social Christian Unity Party	PUSC	8,020	426	935	2,180	1,262	443	1,577	1,048	869	740	2,928	353	1,787	633	545	23,746	6.50%	1
Costa Rican Renewal Party	PRC	3,679	95	355	1,442	262	323	654	360	698	343	3,694	179	3,422	298	352	16,156	4.42%	0
National Restoration Party of Alajuela	PRN	2,590	41	140	861	18	38	250	33	256	213	2,353	17	221	59	208	7,298	2.00%	0
Patriotic Alliance	AP	1,144	228	359	678	28	90	165	22	979	88	582	111	2,062	345	41	6,922	1.89%	0
Broad Front	FA	1,809	55	210	463	41	42	268	55	434	150	503	20	628	105	52	4,835	1.32%	0
Alajuelan Familiar Force Party	FFA	553	5	28	170	10	5	52	77	20	243	161	6	118	146	15	1,609	0.44%	0
National Integration Party	PIN	600	13	58	127	12	11	56	14	62	50	118	7	147	23	16	1,314	0.36%	0
Valid votes		117,283	6,341	12,892	36,002	5,462	5,577	19,640	8,347	18,072	13,343	60,676	2,570	37,787	12,593	8,963	365,548	100.00%	11
Blank votes		915	64	166	394	99	84	258	73	265	127	673	39	506	223	66	3,952	1.05%	
Rejected votes – other		1,619	56	178	437	139	139	283	138	299	165	921	60	535	318	125	5,412	1.44%	
Total polled		119,817	6,461	13,236	36,833	5,700	5,800	20,181	8,558	18,636	13,635	62,270	2,669	38,828	13,134	9,154	374,912	71.52%	
Registered electors		170,966	7,844	17,379	50,109	8,729	9,004	27,740	12,685	24,911	17,866	86,525	3,798	52,853	21,183	12,623	524,215		
Turnout		70.08%	82.37%	76.16%	73.51%	65.30%	64.42%	72.75%	67.47%	74.81%	76.32%	71.97%	70.27%	73.46%	62.00%	72.52%	71.52%		

The following candidates were elected: Juan Bosco Acevedo Hurtado (PLN); Edgar Araya Pineda (PLN); Víctor Danilo Cubero Corrales (PML); María Julia Fonseca Solano (PLN); Fabio Molina Rojas (PLN); Néstor Manrique Oviedo Guzmán (PAC); José Joaquín Porras Contreras (PASE); Pilar Porras Zúñiga (PLN); Luis Alberto Rojas Valerio (PUSC); María Jeannette Ruiz Delgado (PAC); and Mireya Zamora Alvarado (PML).

==== 2000s ====
===== 2006 =====
Results of the 2006 general election held on 5 February 2006:

Party		Votes per canton															Total votes	%	Seats
Party		Ala- juela	Alfaro Ruiz	Atenas	Grecia	Gua- tuso	Los Chiles	Naranjo	Orotina	Pal- mares	Poás	San Carlos	San Mateo	San Ramón	Upala	Valverde Vega	Total votes	%	Seats
National Liberation Party	PLN	36,960	2,031	3,190	12,135	1,846	1,728	6,781	3,849	5,761	4,848	18,189	973	9,446	4,656	2,174	114,567	37.27%	5
Citizens' Action Party	PAC	29,618	1,812	3,654	8,832	744	1,438	4,494	1,603	3,808	3,315	14,158	381	8,396	1,957	1,067	85,277	27.74%	4
Libertarian Movement	PML	9,353	194	486	2,185	178	157	1,995	348	822	1,049	2,974	116	1,233	293	2,638	24,021	7.81%	1
Social Christian Unity Party	PUSC	7,117	272	681	2,806	685	412	808	675	615	608	2,711	338	1,753	1,218	558	21,257	6.92%	1
Costa Rican Renewal Party	PRC	3,218	55	400	1,560	409	274	692	188	632	388	1,789	103	1,950	870	340	12,868	4.19%	0
Agrarian Labour Action Party	PALA	718	844	1,296	1,104	221	209	426	32	268	132	4,154	240	1,498	391	180	11,713	3.81%	0
Alajuelense Democratic Action Party	PADA	1,328	87	115	270	41	46	230	27	612	127	495	17	4,332	86	54	7,867	2.56%	0
National Union Party	PUN	1,391	52	139	371	78	116	576	115	1,779	148	1,852	41	959	59	153	7,829	2.55%	0
Union for Change Party	PUPC	4,213	50	304	428	34	31	184	149	474	200	826	21	280	92	113	7,399	2.41%	0
Democratic Nationalist Alliance	ADN	1,426	25	783	364	21	12	167	43	322	83	413	8	527	30	36	4,260	1.39%	0
Homeland First Party	PPP	1,582	31	142	424	40	45	209	70	179	181	473	15	391	99	77	3,958	1.29%	0
Democratic Force	FD	358	18	31	90	12	19	43	16	203	65	1,006	3	306	40	13	2,223	0.72%	0
Patriotic Union	UP	562	40	81	116	16	16	84	8	67	69	695	5	132	48	14	1,953	0.64%	0
National Integration Party	PIN	757	6	29	96	13	6	32	17	40	55	130	0	159	38	19	1,397	0.45%	0
United Left	IU	433	7	26	62	6	6	23	14	37	22	44	4	72	13	22	791	0.26%	0
Valid votes		99,034	5,524	11,357	30,843	4,344	4,515	16,744	7,154	15,619	11,290	49,909	2,265	31,434	9,890	7,458	307,380	100.00%	11
Blank votes		655	45	118	294	84	70	177	42	206	82	488	30	371	169	76	2,907	0.92%	
Rejected votes – other		1,858	87	191	480	160	137	323	142	357	165	1,127	72	873	360	143	6,475	2.04%	
Total polled		101,547	5,656	11,666	31,617	4,588	4,722	17,244	7,338	16,182	11,537	51,524	2,367	32,678	10,419	7,677	316,762	67.99%	
Registered electors		154,292	6,971	15,594	44,895	7,496	7,962	25,048	10,936	22,002	15,810	74,964	3,451	46,833	18,397	11,220	465,871		
Turnout		65.81%	81.14%	74.81%	70.42%	61.21%	59.31%	68.84%	67.10%	73.55%	72.97%	68.73%	68.59%	69.78%	56.63%	68.42%	67.99%		

The following candidates were elected: Luis Carlos Araya Monge (PLN); Luis Antonio Barrantes Castro (PML); Sadie Bravo Pérez (PAC); Gladys González Barrantes (PLN); Nidia María González Morera (PAC); Salvador Quirós Conejo (PLN); Marvin Mauricio Rojas Rodríguez (PAC); José Joaquín Salazar Rojas (PAC); José Luis Valenciano Chaves (PLN); Lorena María Vásquez Badilla (PUSC); and Janina del Vecchio Ugalde (PLN).

===== 2002 =====
Results of the 2002 general election held on 3 February 2002:

Party		Votes per canton															Total votes	%	Seats
Party		Ala- juela	Alfaro Ruiz	Atenas	Grecia	Gua- tuso	Los Chiles	Naranjo	Orotina	Pal- mares	Poás	San Carlos	San Mateo	San Ramón	Upala	Valverde Vega	Total votes	%	Seats
National Liberation Party	PLN	25,104	1,607	2,684	7,248	1,700	1,398	5,207	2,724	6,943	2,981	15,190	783	8,040	4,139	1,786	87,534	30.47%	4
Social Christian Unity Party	PUSC	28,664	1,333	2,875	9,068	1,745	1,520	5,009	2,395	3,641	2,849	13,555	777	7,178	3,784	2,367	86,760	30.20%	4
Citizens' Action Party	PAC	20,249	879	2,426	8,185	386	749	2,731	954	1,968	2,185	9,979	271	6,465	897	1,090	59,414	20.68%	2
Libertarian Movement	PML	9,081	226	566	1,452	140	109	1,305	391	1,047	1,030	3,394	63	1,537	162	1,032	21,535	7.50%	1
Agrarian Labour Action Party	PALA	833	1,050	1,127	1,188	143	249	830	45	278	427	1,667	249	2,146	472	186	10,890	3.79%	0
Costa Rican Renewal Party	PRC	2,710	28	233	862	196	267	428	118	334	267	1,121	79	983	268	214	8,108	2.82%	0
National Integration Party	PIN	1,568	20	46	119	67	9	144	40	119	86	187	38	1,598	49	27	4,117	1.43%	0
Democratic Force	FD	1,085	48	129	761	36	37	114	84	106	120	407	9	769	61	50	3,816	1.33%	0
Coalition Change 2000	CC2000	352	12	30	114	3	22	47	29	20	33	996	11	91	11	13	1,784	0.62%	0
National Christian Alliance	ANC	463	4	37	49	14	10	27	7	21	30	204	5	55	30	12	968	0.34%	0
National Rescue Party	PRN	581	6	17	65	6	29	40	12	28	21	57	5	63	16	10	956	0.33%	0
National Patriotic Party	PPN	273	7	21	83	6	18	54	9	19	28	53	3	85	21	18	698	0.24%	0
Independent Workers' Party	PIO	128	3	10	32	12	4	20	6	20	16	50	3	40	33	6	383	0.13%	0
General Union Party	PUGEN	117	5	14	30	2	6	21	3	15	14	64	2	32	9	12	346	0.12%	0
Valid votes		91,208	5,228	10,215	29,256	4,456	4,427	15,977	6,817	14,559	10,087	46,924	2,298	29,082	9,952	6,823	287,309	100.00%	11
Blank votes		896	52	145	352	74	126	276	59	244	126	609	53	618	241	75	3,946	1.33%	
Rejected votes – other		1,583	74	162	366	131	123	246	98	234	184	808	50	594	294	91	5,038	1.70%	
Total polled		93,687	5,354	10,522	29,974	4,661	4,676	16,499	6,974	15,037	10,397	48,341	2,401	30,294	10,487	6,989	296,293	72.17%	
Registered electors		136,161	6,323	13,780	40,012	6,717	7,086	22,482	9,523	19,191	13,663	64,638	3,177	41,568	16,346	9,871	410,538		
Turnout		68.81%	84.67%	76.36%	74.91%	69.39%	65.99%	73.39%	73.23%	78.35%	76.10%	74.79%	75.57%	72.88%	64.16%	70.80%	72.17%		

The following candidates were elected: José Humberto Arce Salas (PAC); Mario Calderón Castillo (PUSC); Álvaro González Alfaro (PLN); Gerardo Alberto González Esquivel (PUSC); Luis Ángel Ramírez Ramírez (PLN); German Rojas Hidalgo (PUSC); Lilliana Salas Salazar (PUSC); Carlos Salazar Ramírez (PML); Guido Vega Molina (PLN); Martha Zamora Castillo (PAC); and Joyce Mary Zürcher Blen (PLN).

==== 1990s ====
===== 1998 =====
Results of the 1998 general election held on 1 February 1998:

Party		Votes per canton															Total votes	%	Seats
Party		Ala- juela	Alfaro Ruiz	Atenas	Grecia	Gua- tuso	Los Chiles	Naranjo	Orotina	Pal- mares	Poás	San Carlos	San Mateo	San Ramón	Upala	Valverde Vega	Total votes	%	Seats
Social Christian Unity Party	PUSC	33,463	1,632	2,743	11,661	2,388	1,902	6,006	3,098	3,919	3,283	15,765	1,087	8,823	4,755	4,022	104,547	40.89%	4
National Liberation Party	PLN	28,390	2,200	2,132	10,034	1,517	1,162	5,010	2,580	4,973	3,341	15,806	785	7,071	3,867	1,941	90,809	35.52%	4
Agrarian Labour Action Party	PALA	1,495	544	3,871	2,235	184	664	958	24	891	611	2,145	171	2,566	455	141	16,955	6.63%	1
Democratic Force	FD	4,503	79	105	460	72	84	456	216	617	429	1,052	40	4,970	113	108	13,304	5.20%	1
Alajuelense Democratic Action Party	PADA	1,428	38	28	437	65	215	162	49	108	194	3,483	8	358	25	16	6,614	2.59%	0
Libertarian Movement	PML	1,616	39	59	371	8	29	148	94	254	134	541	10	176	20	78	3,577	1.40%	0
Costa Rican Renewal Party	PRC	1,069	29	31	612	18	8	551	38	101	72	263	33	577	20	105	3,527	1.38%	0
National Independent Party	PNI	2,766	4	10	86	2	5	43	89	24	175	176	0	26	16	3	3,425	1.34%	0
National Integration Party	PIN	1,816	30	53	316	16	13	158	75	138	149	256	10	222	47	30	3,329	1.30%	0
Democratic Party	PD	1,079	15	60	360	6	27	346	42	298	87	136	7	215	30	42	2,750	1.08%	0
Change Now	CY	77	30	9	37	21	10	553	7	14	2	1,376	3	30	34	20	2,223	0.87%	0
United People	PU	336	12	18	72	5	2	44	17	84	30	55	1	345	18	4	1,043	0.41%	0
National Christian Alliance	ANC	585	0	22	78	8	12	22	18	25	32	87	2	38	21	16	966	0.38%	0
National Rescue Party	PRN	174	5	6	42	4	6	34	10	204	7	232	7	56	16	2	805	0.31%	0
Independent Party	PI	632	2	5	27	2	1	21	3	17	15	23	1	19	5	7	780	0.31%	0
New Democratic Party	NPD	209	3	155	41	7	5	13	15	78	19	35	22	22	20	6	650	0.25%	0
General Union Party	PUGEN	129	2	8	25	9	1	18	6	12	9	86	0	34	15	9	363	0.14%	0
Valid votes		79,767	4,664	9,315	26,894	4,332	4,146	14,543	6,381	11,757	8,589	41,517	2,187	25,548	9,477	6,550	255,667	100.00%	10
Blank votes		646	46	111	308	102	87	229	62	197	103	565	34	374	241	77	3,182	1.20%	
Rejected votes – other		1,632	61	305	421	135	237	257	114	298	170	994	83	581	326	81	5,695	2.15%	
Total polled		82,045	4,771	9,731	27,623	4,569	4,470	15,029	6,557	12,252	8,862	43,076	2,304	26,503	10,044	6,708	264,544	72.83%	
Registered electors		119,154	5,734	12,513	35,821	6,263	6,541	20,260	8,457	16,659	11,853	56,664	2,892	36,460	14,996	8,971	363,238		
Turnout		68.86%	83.21%	77.77%	77.11%	72.95%	68.34%	74.18%	77.53%	73.55%	74.77%	76.02%	79.67%	72.69%	66.98%	74.77%	72.83%		

The following candidates were elected: Rigoberto Abarca Rojas (PUSC); Frantz Alberto Acosta Polonio (PLN); Rafael Humberto Arias Fallas (PLN); Juven Cambronero Castro (PLN); Célimo Guido Cruz (FD); Everardo Rodríguez Bastos (PUSC); Carlos Enrique Salas Salazar (PUSC); Jorge Eduardo Soto Chavarría (PUSC); Guido Octavio Vargas Artavia (PALA); and Carlos Alberto Villalobos Arias (PLN).

===== 1994 =====
Results of the 1994 general election held on 6 February 1994:

Party		Votes per canton															Total votes	%	Seats
Party		Ala- juela	Alfaro Ruiz	Atenas	Grecia	Gua- tuso	Los Chiles	Naranjo	Orotina	Pal- mares	Poás	San Carlos	San Mateo	San Ramón	Upala	Valverde Vega	Total votes	%	Seats
National Liberation Party	PLN	38,271	2,295	4,256	13,268	1,993	1,862	8,145	3,973	5,721	4,706	18,478	1,261	12,318	4,929	3,062	124,538	46.36%	5
Social Christian Unity Party	PUSC	36,310	1,549	5,216	11,723	1,943	1,345	6,325	2,848	5,108	3,505	15,560	1,001	10,550	4,723	3,133	110,839	41.26%	5
Alajuelense Democratic Action Party	PADA	2,156	126	64	211	134	879	232	26	199	251	6,777	11	451	72	41	11,630	4.33%	0
Democratic Force	FD	3,558	27	159	585	26	55	355	72	1,409	263	604	41	1,819	69	172	9,214	3.43%	0
Agrarian Labour Action Party	PALA	465	871	75	636	29	40	243	4	43	170	229	2	911	74	67	3,859	1.44%	0
National Christian Alliance	ANC	1,331	20	104	406	52	36	185	27	85	106	317	6	261	84	75	3,095	1.15%	0
Independent Party	PI	1,472	5	25	40	9	5	19	1	24	67	45	0	58	22	13	1,805	0.67%	0
People's Vanguard Party	PVP	773	14	51	126	16	22	53	20	65	46	205	6	177	67	15	1,656	0.62%	0
General Union Party	PUGEN	492	5	17	86	8	5	36	12	38	43	200	2	100	26	12	1,082	0.40%	0
National Independent Party	PNI	605	4	23	53	4	8	27	7	26	29	53	3	66	24	11	943	0.35%	0
Valid votes		85,433	4,916	9,990	27,134	4,214	4,257	15,620	6,990	12,718	9,186	42,468	2,333	26,711	10,090	6,601	268,661	100.00%	10
Blank votes		910	47	132	310	73	94	282	55	195	112	533	43	572	233	74	3,665	1.32%	
Rejected votes – other		1,644	76	132	480	153	240	268	147	230	177	1,272	58	507	321	163	5,868	2.11%	
Total polled		87,987	5,039	10,254	27,924	4,440	4,591	16,170	7,192	13,143	9,475	44,273	2,434	27,790	10,644	6,838	278,194	84.42%	
Registered electors		106,524	5,428	11,601	32,092	5,423	5,796	18,854	8,173	15,290	10,862	51,646	2,697	33,222	13,609	8,336	329,553		
Turnout		82.60%	92.83%	88.39%	87.01%	81.87%	79.21%	85.76%	88.00%	85.96%	87.23%	85.72%	90.25%	83.65%	78.21%	82.03%	84.42%		

The following candidates were elected: Gerardo Araya Paniagua (PUSC); Manuel Antonio Barrantes Rodríguez (PLN); Alejandro Chaves Ovares (PUSC); María Elsy Corrales Blanco (PUSC); Rolando González Ulloa (PLN); Juan Luis Jiménez Succar (PLN); Alexander Salas Araya (PUSC); Leonel Solís Piedra (PLN); Carmen María Valverde Acosta (PLN); and Lorena María Vásquez Badilla (PUSC).

===== 1990 =====
Results of the 1990 general election held on 4 February 1990:

Party		Votes per canton															Total votes	%	Seats
Party		Ala- juela	Alfaro Ruiz	Atenas	Grecia	Gua- tuso	Los Chiles	Naranjo	Orotina	Pal- mares	Poás	San Carlos	San Mateo	San Ramón	Upala	Valverde Vega	Total votes	%	Seats
Social Christian Unity Party	PUSC	35,996	1,599	4,527	11,204	1,672	1,654	6,713	3,322	5,698	3,515	18,791	1,218	10,215	4,594	3,224	113,942	46.90%	5
National Liberation Party	PLN	31,564	2,220	3,656	10,593	1,607	1,508	6,425	2,589	5,120	3,641	18,276	943	10,717	3,968	2,781	105,608	43.47%	5
Alajuelense Solidarity Party	PAS	3,954	16	189	216	19	36	395	45	322	153	229	20	1,462	160	114	7,330	3.02%	0
Agrarian Labour Action Party	PALA	214	694	379	997	47	432	227	10	105	458	301	2	726	22	142	4,756	1.96%	0
United People	PU	1,589	6	97	320	11	23	150	56	217	156	212	10	518	80	24	3,469	1.43%	0
National Christian Alliance	ANC	1,014	23	65	571	103	85	167	60	70	168	726	9	240	92	38	3,431	1.41%	0
General Union Party	PUGEN	733	6	42	108	2	1	64	40	66	72	84	4	94	17	10	1,343	0.55%	0
National Independent Party	PNI	576	6	30	123	4	11	54	15	37	24	101	25	75	27	19	1,127	0.46%	0
Independent Party	PI	819	0	9	30	9	4	16	6	15	20	23	2	16	5	11	985	0.41%	0
Party of Progress	PdP	379	5	48	43	9	9	64	9	161	26	55	5	102	17	9	941	0.39%	0
Valid votes		76,838	4,575	9,042	24,205	3,483	3,763	14,275	6,152	11,811	8,233	38,798	2,238	24,165	8,982	6,372	242,932	100.00%	10
Blank votes		752	51	126	299	60	76	268	43	166	126	480	20	425	160	86	3,138	1.25%	
Rejected votes – other		1,922	74	155	497	131	250	259	125	205	223	694	57	606	301	177	5,676	2.25%	
Total polled		79,512	4,700	9,323	25,001	3,674	4,089	14,802	6,320	12,182	8,582	39,972	2,315	25,196	9,443	6,635	251,746	84.93%	
Registered electors		94,813	5,062	10,684	28,565	4,637	5,083	17,227	7,242	13,930	9,721	46,824	2,594	29,871	12,315	7,851	296,419		
Turnout		83.86%	92.85%	87.26%	87.52%	79.23%	80.44%	85.92%	87.27%	87.45%	88.28%	85.37%	89.24%	84.35%	76.68%	84.51%	84.93%		

The following candidates were elected: Franklin Fernando Acevedo Hurtado (PUSC); Gerardo Bolaños Alpízar (PUSC); Claudio Vinicio Carvajal Orlich (PUSC); Marco Antonio González Salazar (PLN); Carlos Eduardo Monge Herrera (PUSC); Enid Sonia Rodríguez Quesada (PLN); Víctor Emilio Rojas Hidalgo (PUSC); María de los Ángeles Sancho Barquero (PLN); Flory Soto Valerio (PUSC); and Edgar Ugalde Álvarez (PLN).

==== 1980s ====
===== 1986 =====
Results of the 1986 general election held on 2 February 1986:

Party		Votes per canton															Total votes	%	Seats
Party		Ala- juela	Alfaro Ruiz	Atenas	Grecia	Gua- tuso	Los Chiles	Naranjo	Orotina	Pal- mares	Poás	San Carlos	San Mateo	San Ramón	Upala	Valverde Vega	Total votes	%	Seats
National Liberation Party	PLN	29,555	2,503	3,716	10,610	1,302	1,561	7,356	2,779	5,813	3,509	17,631	1,014	11,396	3,271	2,710	104,726	49.86%	5
Social Christian Unity Party	PUSC	27,081	1,521	4,054	8,719	1,003	1,200	5,747	2,609	4,634	2,649	14,232	920	8,561	2,422	2,888	88,240	42.01%	5
Alajuelense Democratic Action Party	PADA	2,729	9	67	629	29	3	29	14	99	341	131	7	115	17	105	4,324	2.06%	0
Alajuelense Solidarity Party	PAS	2,457	6	31	68	60	122	19	15	31	44	111	11	53	556	20	3,604	1.72%	0
People's Alliance Coalition	CAP	1,251	7	74	240	11	17	72	48	163	44	178	4	511	71	11	2,702	1.29%	0
United People	PU	1,126	14	170	254	12	14	71	37	196	130	164	8	327	32	26	2,581	1.23%	0
National Christian Alliance	ANC	712	9	30	321	47	71	44	30	35	45	675	5	121	98	30	2,273	1.08%	0
National Republican Party	PNR	496	9	43	92	21	18	53	34	78	27	164	12	135	42	34	1,258	0.60%	0
Independent Party	PI	83	1	5	24	2	3	12	8	13	23	29	3	17	13	6	242	0.12%	0
General Union Party	PUGEN	44	0	3	24	1	1	2	3	7	6	8	0	5	2	3	109	0.05%	0
Valid votes		65,534	4,079	8,193	20,981	2,488	3,010	13,405	5,577	11,069	6,818	33,323	1,984	21,241	6,524	5,833	210,059	100.00%	10
Blank votes		700	57	135	328	67	47	175	64	170	99	470	29	442	166	86	3,035	1.39%	
Rejected votes – other		2,161	18	156	401	103	110	206	150	176	174	717	35	366	345	151	5,269	2.41%	
Total polled		68,395	4,154	8,484	21,710	2,658	3,167	13,786	5,791	11,415	7,091	34,510	2,048	22,049	7,035	6,070	218,363	84.74%	
Registered electors		82,293	4,512	9,662	24,849	3,361	4,077	15,775	6,613	12,664	8,180	40,860	2,315	25,871	9,666	7,001	257,699		
Turnout		83.11%	92.07%	87.81%	87.37%	79.08%	77.68%	87.39%	87.57%	90.14%	86.69%	84.46%	88.47%	85.23%	72.78%	86.70%	84.74%		

The following candidates were elected: María Eugenia Badilla Rojas (PUSC); William Gerardo Corrales Araya (PLN); Aníbal Enrique González Barrantes (PLN); Fernando Jiménez Maroto (PUSC); Víctor Manuel Lizano Barahona (PUSC); José Antonio Lobo Solera (PUSC); Fabio Molina Rojas (PLN); José Luis Ureña Ulate (PLN); José Luis Valenciano Chaves (PLN); and Federico Villalobos Villalobos (PUSC).

===== 1982 =====
Results of the 1982 general election held on 7 February 1982:

Party		Votes per canton															Total votes	%	Seats
Party		Ala- juela	Alfaro Ruiz	Atenas	Grecia	Gua- tuso	Los Chiles	Naranjo	Orotina	Pal- mares	Poás	San Carlos	San Mateo	San Ramón	Upala	Valverde Vega	Total votes	%	Seats
National Liberation Party	PLN	24,972	2,216	3,650	10,084	975	1,308	6,771	2,865	5,609	3,258	16,054	1,063	9,646	3,030	2,579	94,080	55.50%	6
Unity Coalition	CU	12,867	1,139	2,582	5,605	562	427	3,677	1,536	3,052	1,662	8,178	536	6,019	1,207	1,969	51,018	30.10%	3
Alajuelense Democratic Action Party	PADA	10,921	10	231	466	19	14	120	61	36	233	148	13	115	50	49	12,486	7.37%	1
United People	PU	2,187	18	307	705	35	93	183	101	387	146	337	30	678	254	56	5,517	3.25%	0
National Movement	MN	1,500	35	168	322	65	23	164	144	95	140	992	40	344	69	46	4,147	2.45%	0
National Democratic Party	PND	195	14	30	58	4	3	40	12	78	17	147	7	626	11	18	1,260	0.74%	0
Independent Party	PI	374	3	11	39	5	6	37	4	24	16	66	6	33	20	8	652	0.38%	0
Democratic Party	PD	111	1	13	37	5	2	21	10	20	10	60	2	37	16	9	354	0.21%	0
Valid votes		53,127	3,436	6,992	17,316	1,670	1,876	11,013	4,733	9,301	5,482	25,982	1,697	17,498	4,657	4,734	169,514	100.00%	10
Blank votes		483	41	108	238	27	30	146	47	118	83	356	30	316	125	65	2,213	1.25%	
Rejected votes – other		2,358	24	132	376	45	40	185	130	115	125	509	34	372	142	93	4,680	2.65%	
Total polled		55,968	3,501	7,232	17,930	1,742	1,946	11,344	4,910	9,534	5,690	26,847	1,761	18,186	4,924	4,892	176,407	81.33%	
Registered electors		70,114	3,883	8,577	21,364	2,438	2,915	13,418	5,617	10,816	6,862	33,955	2,084	21,813	7,244	5,816	216,916		
Turnout		79.82%	90.16%	84.32%	83.93%	71.45%	66.76%	84.54%	87.41%	88.15%	82.92%	79.07%	84.50%	83.37%	67.97%	84.11%	81.33%		

The following candidates were elected: Víctor Hugo Alfaro Alfaro (PLN); José Fabio Araya Vargas (PLN); José Javier Bolaños Quesada (PLN); Miguel Ángel Guillén Elizondo (PLN); Marvin Herrera Araya (CU); Rodrigo Mora Alfaro (PLN); Alfonso José Muñoz Vargas (CU); Ricardo Rodríguez Solórzano (CU); Edgar Ugalde Álvarez (PLN); and Óscar Valverde Rodríguez (PADA).

==== 1970s ====
===== 1978 =====
Results of the 1978 general election held on 5 February 1978:

Party		Votes per canton															Total votes	%	Seats
Party		Ala- juela	Alfaro Ruiz	Atenas	Grecia	Gua- tuso	Los Chiles	Naranjo	Orotina	Pal- mares	Poás	San Carlos	San Mateo	San Ramón	Upala	Valverde Vega	Total votes	%	Seats
Unity Coalition	CU	21,388	1,306	3,254	6,230	695	586	4,864	1,932	3,477	2,201	10,496	745	6,717	1,431	2,376	67,698	46.17%	5
National Liberation Party	PLN	16,577	1,706	2,515	7,033	550	794	4,293	1,854	3,621	2,236	10,841	748	6,592	1,811	1,664	62,835	42.85%	5
National Unification Party	PUN	4,256	21	130	294	12	10	90	63	117	104	244	22	688	167	33	6,251	4.26%	0
United People	PU	2,784	36	308	924	8	47	159	142	556	107	358	19	659	37	73	6,217	4.24%	0
Republican Union Party	PUR	432	7	48	67	6	8	35	21	57	89	101	12	121	44	8	1,056	0.72%	0
National Independent Party	PNI	328	7	33	51	4	4	38	26	23	22	60	6	160	23	13	798	0.54%	0
Independent Party	PI	203	4	20	55	5	5	38	18	23	30	77	7	48	18	14	565	0.39%	0
Democratic Party	PD	204	6	13	46	3	1	27	16	16	9	58	2	38	21	6	466	0.32%	0
Costa Rican Concord Party	PCC	175	4	6	148	2	3	9	11	11	9	23	3	15	16	5	440	0.30%	0
National Labour Party	PLN	103	5	16	32	3	7	14	16	15	8	57	1	22	9	6	314	0.21%	0
Valid votes		46,450	3,102	6,343	14,880	1,288	1,465	9,567	4,099	7,916	4,815	22,315	1,565	15,060	3,577	4,198	146,640	100.00%	10
Blank votes		583	65	129	252	44	21	174	45	156	83	368	32	354	93	68	2,467	1.62%	
Rejected votes – other		1,409	29	103	338	35	26	170	137	171	87	444	44	370	134	83	3,580	2.34%	
Total polled		48,442	3,196	6,575	15,470	1,367	1,512	9,911	4,281	8,243	4,985	23,127	1,641	15,784	3,804	4,349	152,687	84.74%	
Registered electors		57,996	3,484	7,543	17,978	1,823	1,987	11,356	4,902	8,970	5,748	27,816	1,882	18,585	5,158	4,960	180,188		
Turnout		83.53%	91.73%	87.17%	86.05%	74.99%	76.09%	87.28%	87.33%	91.90%	86.73%	83.14%	87.19%	84.93%	73.75%	87.68%	84.74%		

The following candidates were elected: Edgar Arroyo Cordero (PLN); Gerardo Bolaños Alpízar (CU); Arnulfo Carmona Benavides (CU); Leticia Chacón Jinesta (CU); Ramón Corrales Blanco (CU); Álvaro Jenkins Morales (PLN); Óscar Rodríguez Johanson (PLN); Hubert Rojas Araya (CU); Carlos Ugalde Álvarez (PLN); and Alicia Vega Rojas (PLN).

===== 1974 =====
Results of the 1974 general election held on 3 February 1974:

Party		Votes per canton															Total votes	%	Seats
Party		Ala- juela	Alfaro Ruiz	Atenas	Grecia	Gua- tuso	Los Chiles	Naranjo	Orotina	Pal- mares	Poás	San Carlos	San Mateo	San Ramón	Upala	Valverde Vega	Total votes	%	Seats
National Liberation Party	PLN	14,432	1,481	2,186	5,381	366	494	3,582	1,536	2,937	1,794	8,648	673	6,008	1,236	1,141	51,895	44.32%	5
National Unification Party	PUN	7,200	629	1,613	3,448	312	293	2,713	681	1,739	416	4,368	402	4,007	583	977	29,381	25.09%	3
National Independent Party	PNI	5,602	239	273	1,489	46	25	617	840	377	1,030	2,124	141	573	143	467	13,986	11.95%	1
Democratic Renewal Party	PRD	3,490	178	774	920	50	11	582	299	896	298	1,268	103	1,164	104	626	10,763	9.19%	1
Democratic Party	PD	2,544	11	81	261	1	3	111	30	88	76	127	17	70	20	27	3,467	2.96%	0
National Republican Party	PRN	1,272	34	243	240	18	9	111	104	149	128	242	17	482	57	46	3,152	2.69%	0
Socialist Action Party	PASO	896	14	242	377	8	3	70	65	52	40	152	11	284	19	20	2,253	1.92%	0
Christian Democratic Party	PDC	485	16	21	146	3	3	46	15	53	24	66	8	36	22	11	955	0.82%	0
Costa Rican Socialist Party	PSC	372	6	66	47	1	2	19	20	192	20	38	1	87	4	6	881	0.75%	0
Independent Party	PI	101	3	9	39	4	5	22	19	6	25	66	3	26	11	11	350	0.30%	0
Valid votes		36,394	2,611	5,508	12,348	809	848	7,873	3,609	6,489	3,851	17,099	1,376	12,737	2,199	3,332	117,083	100.00%	10
Blank votes		597	74	161	279	48	16	196	73	137	134	411	49	297	90	92	2,654	2.16%	
Rejected votes – other		1,117	45	137	307	45	19	172	127	124	95	400	36	303	82	112	3,121	2.54%	
Total polled		38,108	2,730	5,806	12,934	902	883	8,241	3,809	6,750	4,080	17,910	1,461	13,337	2,371	3,536	122,858	82.12%	
Registered electors		46,814	3,083	6,853	15,534	1,342	1,185	9,966	4,404	7,592	5,020	22,459	1,687	15,857	3,569	4,240	149,605		
Turnout		81.40%	88.55%	84.72%	83.26%	67.21%	74.51%	82.69%	86.49%	88.91%	81.27%	79.75%	86.60%	84.11%	66.43%	83.40%	82.12%		

The following candidates were elected: Carlos Manuel Álvarez Murillo (PLN); Deseado Barboza Ruiz (PUN); Juan de Dios Fernández Rothe (PNI); Arturo Hidalgo Rojas (PLN); Juan Elías Lara Herrera (PRD); Roberto Losilla Gamboa (PLN); Rafael Ángel Rojas Jiménez (PLN); Luis Alberto Salas Corrales (PUN); Guillermo Sandoval Aguilar (PLN); and Álvaro Suárez Bolaños (PUN).

===== 1970 =====
Results of the 1970 general election held on 1 February 1970:

Party		Votes per canton												Total votes	%	Seats
Party		Ala- juela	Alfaro Ruiz	Atenas	Grecia	Naranjo	Orotina	Pal- mares	Poás	San Carlos	San Mateo	San Ramón	Valverde Vega	Total votes	%	Seats
National Liberation Party	PLN	13,731	1,423	2,491	6,658	3,512	1,591	3,037	1,943	7,724	679	5,640	1,529	49,958	52.31%	6
National Unification Party	PUN	11,618	791	1,727	4,919	2,679	1,404	1,956	1,323	5,793	515	2,748	1,280	36,753	38.49%	4
National Front Party	PFN	575	32	111	718	106	44	235	26	269	20	1,527	32	3,695	3.87%	0
Socialist Action Party	PASO	1,200	8	229	337	62	28	65	21	82	10	244	14	2,300	2.41%	0
Christian Democratic Party	PDC	494	10	29	77	115	9	146	13	36	5	380	12	1,326	1.39%	0
National Union Party	PUN	565	12	348	53	26	4	30	15	136	5	50	7	1,251	1.31%	0
Costa Rican Renewal Movement	MRC	85	0	9	28	10	6	5	7	26	1	34	3	214	0.22%	0
Valid votes		28,268	2,276	4,944	12,790	6,510	3,086	5,474	3,348	14,066	1,235	10,623	2,877	95,497	100.00%	10
Blank votes		525	40	138	373	167	42	135	89	302	38	279	78	2,206	2.18%	
Rejected votes – other		1,199	37	149	462	209	105	116	95	402	36	492	85	3,387	3.35%	
Total polled		29,992	2,353	5,231	13,625	6,886	3,233	5,725	3,532	14,770	1,309	11,394	3,040	101,090	86.00%	
Registered electors		35,188	2,551	5,848	16,267	7,886	3,696	6,294	4,134	17,330	1,526	13,373	3,459	117,552		
Turnout		85.23%	92.24%	89.45%	83.76%	87.32%	87.47%	90.96%	85.44%	85.23%	85.78%	85.20%	87.89%	86.00%		

The following candidates were elected: Álvaro Aguilar Peralta (PUN); Claudio César Araya Rodríguez (PLN); José Fabio Araya Vargas (PLN); Edgar Arroyo Cordero (PLN); Óscar Chavarría Poli (PUN); Gonzalo Gómez Cordero (PLN); Gonzalo Monge Herrera (PUN); Francisco Morales Hernández (PLN); Fulvio Rodríguez Sagot (PUN); and Carlos Ugalde Álvarez (PLN).

==== 1960s ====
===== 1966 =====
Results of the 1966 general election held on 6 February 1966:

Party		Votes per canton												Total votes	%	Seats
Party		Ala- juela	Alfaro Ruiz	Atenas	Grecia	Naranjo	Orotina	Pal- mares	Poás	San Carlos	San Mateo	San Ramón	Valverde Vega	Total votes	%	Seats
National Liberation Party	PLN	9,989	1,104	2,026	4,978	3,025	1,212	2,301	1,463	5,221	582	4,935	1,130	37,966	49.22%	5
National Unification Party	PUN	9,599	731	2,118	4,560	2,503	1,403	1,974	1,175	4,847	453	3,996	1,023	34,382	44.57%	5
Revolutionary Civic Union	UCR	545	43	94	224	211	75	254	99	378	23	316	132	2,394	3.10%	0
Democratic Party	PD	1,828	10	41	109	44	20	75	25	61	15	144	21	2,393	3.10%	0
Valid votes		21,961	1,888	4,279	9,871	5,783	2,710	4,604	2,762	10,507	1,073	9,391	2,306	77,135	100.00%	10
Blank votes		405	53	117	226	143	48	125	86	243	41	176	60	1,723	2.05%	
Rejected votes – other		2,016	68	186	505	332	191	227	220	691	70	365	164	5,035	6.00%	
Total polled		24,382	2,009	4,582	10,602	6,258	2,949	4,956	3,068	11,441	1,184	9,932	2,530	83,893	85.11%	
Registered electors		28,711	2,221	5,224	12,886	7,181	3,439	5,509	3,487	13,963	1,423	11,600	2,925	98,569		
Turnout		84.92%	90.45%	87.71%	82.28%	87.15%	85.75%	89.96%	87.98%	81.94%	83.20%	85.62%	86.50%	85.11%		

The following candidates were elected: Antonio Arroyo Alfaro (PLN); Freddy Arroyo Ramírez (PLN); José Antonio Bolaños Rojas (PUN); Arnulfo Carmona Benavides (PLN); Roberto Chacón Murillo (PUN); Germán Gago Pérez (PLN); Lindbergh Quesada Álvarez (PUN); Ricardo Román Román (PUN); José Rafael Vega Rojas (PLN); and Trino Zamora Jiménez (PUN).

===== 1962 =====
Results of the 1962 general election held on 4 February 1962:

Party		Votes per canton												Total votes	%	Seats
Party		Ala- juela	Alfaro Ruiz	Atenas	Grecia	Naranjo	Orotina	Pal- mares	Poás	San Carlos	San Mateo	San Ramón	Valverde Vega	Total votes	%	Seats
National Liberation Party	PLN	8,341	980	1,730	4,388	2,853	1,399	2,100	1,390	4,680	741	5,138	1,170	34,910	50.29%	6
Republican Party	PR	6,384	377	1,021	2,203	1,536	769	1,103	652	2,239	249	2,262	643	19,438	28.00%	3
National Union Party	PUN	3,945	276	1,006	1,174	1,002	410	937	438	1,457	157	843	151	11,796	16.99%	2
Alajuelan Party	PA	738	15	53	289	78	63	50	76	138	22	109	67	1,698	2.45%	0
Popular Democratic Action	PADP	1,147	4	40	143	26	25	16	6	63	2	97	7	1,576	2.27%	0
Valid votes		20,555	1,652	3,850	8,197	5,495	2,666	4,206	2,562	8,577	1,171	8,449	2,038	69,418	100.00%	11
Blank votes		441	45	137	207	156	38	100	76	226	24	151	64	1,665	2.30%	
Rejected votes – other		494	29	67	142	85	48	61	47	127	16	169	56	1,341	1.85%	
Total polled		21,490	1,726	4,054	8,546	5,736	2,752	4,367	2,685	8,930	1,211	8,769	2,158	72,424	84.06%	
Registered electors		25,577	1,965	4,823	10,370	6,710	3,329	4,807	3,086	10,960	1,494	10,506	2,528	86,155		
Turnout		84.02%	87.84%	84.06%	82.41%	85.48%	82.67%	90.85%	87.01%	81.48%	81.06%	83.47%	85.36%	84.06%		

The following candidates were elected: Nataniel Arias Murillo (PLN); Carmen Barboza Ruiz (PR); Armando Bolaños Bolaños (PLN); Alejandro Galva Jiménez (PR); Carlos Manuel Guardia Esquivel (PR); Nautilio Monge Álvarez (PLN); Cornelio Orlich Bolmarcich (PLN); Sergio Quirós Maroto (PLN); Francisco Ruiz Fernández (PUN); José Valenciano Madrigal (PLN); and Fernando Valverde Vega (PUN).

==== 1950s ====
===== 1958 =====
Results of the 1958 general election held on 2 February 1958:

Party		Votes per canton												Total votes	%	Seats
Party		Ala- juela	Alfaro Ruiz	Atenas	Grecia	Naranjo	Orotina	Pal- mares	Poás	San Carlos	San Mateo	San Ramón	Valverde Vega	Total votes	%	Seats
National Liberation Party	PLN	4,431	609	1,150	2,738	1,993	687	1,260	812	1,795	401	3,408	493	19,777	50.33%	4
National Union Party	PUN	2,536	151	1,017	1,460	669	571	658	370	649	192	1,129	117	9,519	24.22%	2
National Republican Party	PRN	2,666	199	284	911	463	276	475	152	575	48	478	174	6,701	17.05%	2
Independent Party	PI	697	83	239	179	179	64	130	71	282	78	286	59	2,347	5.97%	0
Revolutionary Civic Union	UCR	196	9	32	27	32	14	22	20	199	4	26	39	620	1.58%	0
Democratic Opposition Movement	MDO	53	2	4	27	15	7	16	7	19	1	15	5	171	0.44%	0
Democratic Party	PD	43	5	18	17	15	7	12	4	12	1	19	10	163	0.41%	0
Valid votes		10,622	1,058	2,744	5,359	3,366	1,626	2,573	1,436	3,531	725	5,361	897	39,298	100.00%	8
Blank votes		343	55	102	182	141	59	103	68	187	26	92	32	1,390	3.17%	
Rejected votes – other		1,086	62	165	402	260	146	161	112	331	50	290	71	3,136	7.16%	
Total polled		12,051	1,175	3,011	5,943	3,767	1,831	2,837	1,616	4,049	801	5,743	1,000	43,824	68.25%	
Registered electors		18,136	1,695	4,176	8,069	5,307	2,734	3,640	2,342	6,998	1,167	8,251	1,697	64,212		
Turnout		66.45%	69.32%	72.10%	73.65%	70.98%	66.97%	77.94%	69.00%	57.86%	68.64%	69.60%	58.93%	68.25%		

The following candidates were elected: Porfirio Álvarez González (PLN); Otto Eduardo Kopper Vega (PUN); Alberto Lizano Hernández (PRN); Roberto Losilla Gamboa (PLN); Félix Arcadio Montero Chacón (PLN); Alejandro Morera (PRN); Otilio Ulate Blanco (PUN); and José Rafael Vega Rojas (PLN).

===== 1953 =====
Results of the 1953 general election held on 26 July 1953:

Party		Votes per canton												Total votes	%	Seats
Party		Ala- juela	Alfaro Ruiz	Atenas	Grecia	Naranjo	Orotina	Pal- mares	Poás	San Carlos	San Mateo	San Ramón	Valverde Vega	Total votes	%	Seats
National Liberation Party	PLN	6,774	744	1,569	2,732	2,244	856	1,193	962	1,811	460	2,766	659	22,770	67.81%	6
Democratic Party	PD	3,216	297	482	1,212	536	580	409	205	776	160	778	230	8,881	26.45%	2
National Union Party	PUN	469	60	254	151	99	45	115	80	113	33	492	16	1,927	5.74%	0
Valid votes		10,459	1,101	2,305	4,095	2,879	1,481	1,717	1,247	2,700	653	4,036	905	33,578	100.00%	8
Blank votes		498	86	127	202	175	84	191	83	202	57	216	44	1,965	5.17%	
Rejected votes – other		814	53	110	312	192	114	112	71	151	57	389	92	2,467	6.49%	
Total polled		11,771	1,240	2,542	4,609	3,246	1,679	2,020	1,401	3,053	767	4,641	1,041	38,010	68.69%	
Registered electors		16,109	1,763	3,668	6,874	4,510	2,394	2,755	2,035	5,226	1,155	7,272	1,574	55,335		
Turnout		73.07%	70.33%	69.30%	67.05%	71.97%	70.13%	73.32%	68.85%	58.42%	66.41%	63.82%	66.14%	68.69%		

The following candidates were elected: Alfredo Alfaro Sotela (PD); Óscar Chavarría Poli (PD); Edgar Mora García (PLN); Estela Quesada (PLN); Fabio Quesada Hernández (PLN); Roberto Quirós Sasso (PLN); Luis Ramírez Villalobos (PLN); and Enrique Vega Maroto (PLN).

==== 1940s ====
===== 1949 =====
The following candidates were elected at the 1949 general election held on 4 October 1949: Nautilio Acosta Piepper (PUN); Ramón Arroyo Blanco (PUN); Víctor Chavaría Solano (PC); Lisandro Corrales Blanco (PUN); Omar Quesada Alvarado (PSD); Marcial Rodríguez Conejo (PUN); Álvaro Rojas Espinoza (PUN); Mariano Sanz Soto (PUN); Luis Carlos Suárez Matamoros (PUN); and Francisco Urbina González (PDCA).
