= José María Villalta Flórez-Estrada =

Costa Rican politician (born 1977)

José María Villalta
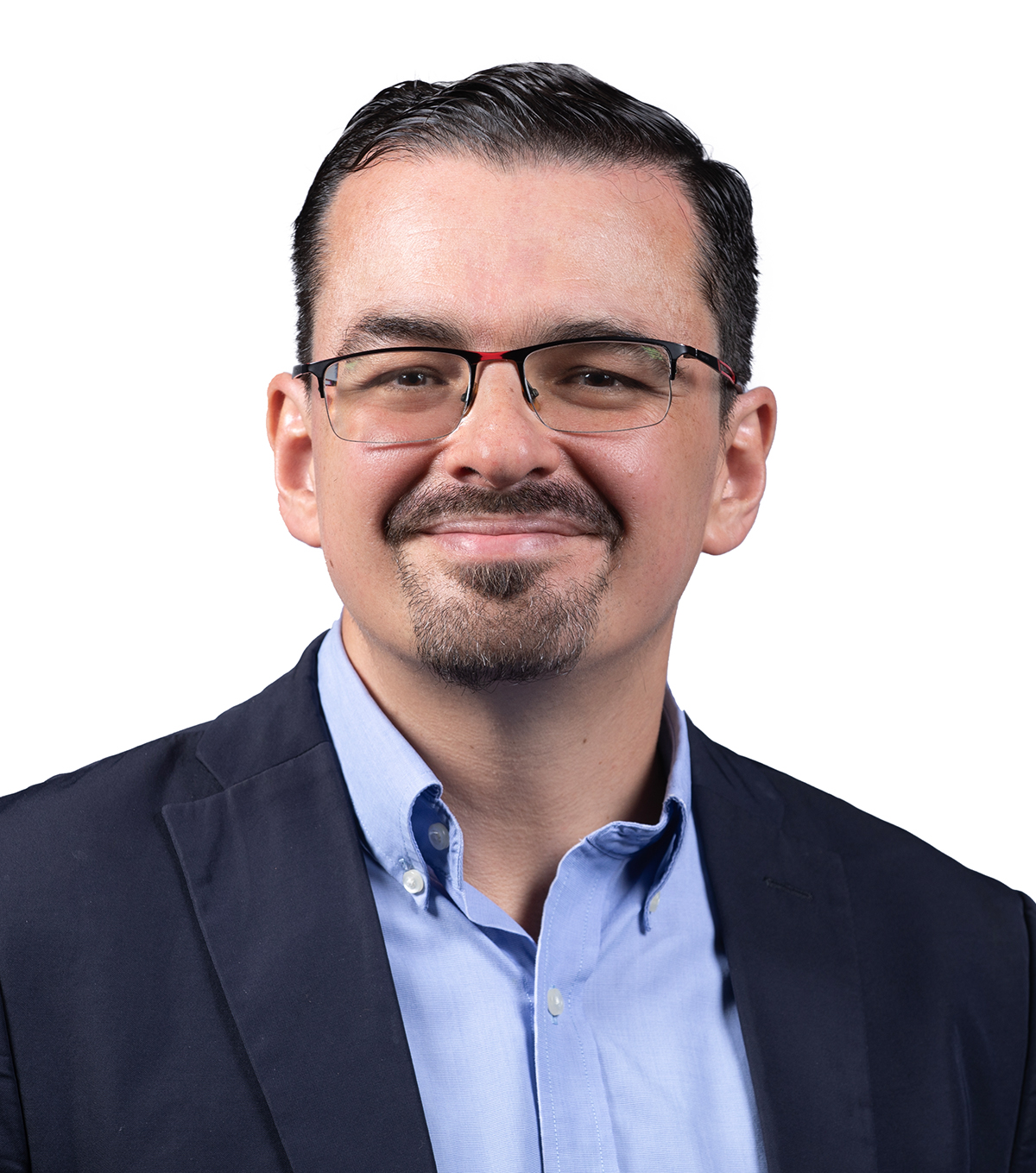
- Official portrait, 2026

Deputy of the Legislative Assembly of Costa Rica
- Incumbent
- Assumed office 1 May 2026
- Preceded by: Ariel Robles Barrantes
- Constituency: San José (14th Office)
- In office 1 May 2018 – 1 May 2022
- Preceded by: Alexandra Loría Beeche
- Succeeded by: Carlos Felipe García Molina
- Constituency: San José (18th Office)
- In office 1 May 2010 – 1 May 2014
- Preceded by: Óscar López Arias
- Succeeded by: Fabricio Alvarado Muñoz
- Constituency: San José (18th Office)

Personal details
- Born: José María Villalta Flórez-Estrada; 13 August 1977 (age 49) San José, Costa Rica
- Party: Broad Front
- Domestic partner: Lauren Chinchilla Alvarado
- Children: 2
- Education: University of Costa Rica (LLB)
- Occupation: Lawyer; environmentalist; politician; professor

José María Villalta Flórez-Estrada (born 13 August 1977) is a Costa Rican lawyer, environmentalist and politician who has served as a Deputy to the Legislative Assembly since 2026. A member of the Broad Front, he previously held a seat from 2010 to 2014 and from 2018 to 2022.

Villalta has been the Broad Front's presidential candidate for the general elections of 2014 and 2022.

== Biography ==
José María is the son of Mario Salazar Villalta (a Costa Rican citizen) and Laura Flórez-Estrada (a Peruvian citizen). He attended primary school in Peru, where he lived some years with his maternal family. In Costa Rica he attended middle school and high school. Later he studied at the University of Costa Rica, where he held positions in student organizations such as the Association of Law Students and the High Student Council (1997-1998). He was a student representative on the University Council and a board member of the Federation of Students (FEUCR) in 1998–2000. During his years as university student, Villalta actively participated in marches against neoliberal reforms. In 2002 he graduated with a degree in law. Between 2001 and 2009, he hosted a television program dedicated to ecological topics.

José María was first parliamentary advisor of José Merino del Río in the last two years of his first term with the Partido Fuerza Democrática (Democratic Force Party) (2000-2002). Then he was advisor of the deputy Gerardo Vargas with Partido Acción Ciudadana (Citizens Action Party) and again with José Merino's advisor in 2002–2006 with the Frente Amplio (Broad Front). He was then elected to the Parliament on the list of San José. He was also an active participant in the movement against CAFTA.

On March 9, the National Assembly chose Villalta as the Frente Amplio candidate for the presidential elections in February 2014. He was defeated in the first of two rounds of elections, where he obtained around seventeen percent of the valid votes.

Since 2008, Villalta lives in a committed relationship with the journalist Lauren Chinchilla Alvarado. They have one son.
