= Patricia Mora =

Patricia Mora may refer to:

- Pat Mora (born 1942), American poet and writer
- Patricia Mora Castellanos (born 1951), Costa Rican academic and politician
