= Working Class Party (Costa Rica) =

Working Class Party Partido de la Clase Trabajadora
- Abbreviation: PT
- President: Jhon Vega Masís
- Founder: Hector Monestel
- Founded: 1 May 2012
- Ideology: Trotskyism; Central American unionism
- Political position: Far-left
- International affiliation: International Revolutionary Workers' Current - Fourth International (CORI-QI)
- Colours: Yellow and red
- Legislative Assembly: 0 / 57

Party flag

Website
- http://ptcostarica.org/

The Working Class Party (Spanish: Partido de la Clase Trabajadora), formerly the Workers' Party (Spanish: Partido de los Trabajadores) until 2024, is a far-left Trotskyist political party of Costa Rica. The party was founded on 1 May 2012 on the basis of the student organization Movement toward Socialism led by labor union leader and lawyer Hector Monestel, and currently holds no seats in parliament nor municipal offices. It is a former member of the International Workers League – Fourth International. Highly critical of the more moderate Broad Front (the main left-wing party of Costa Rica), it proclaims itself as a "classist and socialist alternative". Internationalism is one of its guidelines and as such it proposes the re-establishment of the Federal Republic of Central America abolished in 1838, reuniting all Central American countries in one single socialist Federation. It also defends feminist, environmentalist and pro-LGBTI ideas.

The party contested the 2014 elections with Monestel as nominee obtaining 4,897 votos (0,24%) for the presidential ticket and 12,998 votos (0.63%) for the parliamentary ticket gaining no seats. It took part in the mid-period 2016 municipal elections obtaining only 742 votes, reason why the Electoral Court disbanded the party as Costa Rica's electoral law requires a minimal of 3000 votes for a party to keep legal standing. The party had to make all the process for inscription once again starting as new, successfully registering again for the 2018 Costa Rican general election nominating labor union leader and high school teacher Jhon Vega as candidate, the party received 4,060 votes and was the least voted option.

== Electoral performance ==
=== Presidential ===
Election	Candidate	First round				Second round			
Election	Candidate	Votes	%	Position	Result	Votes	%	Position	Result
2014	Héctor Monestel	4,897	0.24%	11th	Lost	—N/a			
2018	Jhon Vega Masís	4,351	0.20%	11th	Lost	—N/a			
2022	Jhon Vega Masís	1,951	0.09%	▼24th	Lost	—N/a			
2026	David Hernández Brenes	2,737	0.11%	▲15th	Lost	—N/a			

=== Parliamentary ===
Election	Leader	Votes	%	Seats	+/–	Position	Government
2014	Héctor Monestel	12,998	0.63%	0 / 57	New	13th	Extra-parliamentary
2018	Héctor Monestel	11,615	0.54%	0 / 57	0	▼15th	Extra-parliamentary
2022	Héctor Monestel	5,631	0.27%	0 / 57	0	▼26th	Extra-parliamentary
2026	David Hernández Brenes	5,829	0.23%	0 / 57	0	▲18th	Extra-parliamentary
