= Ligia Fallas Rodríguez =

Costa Rican politician

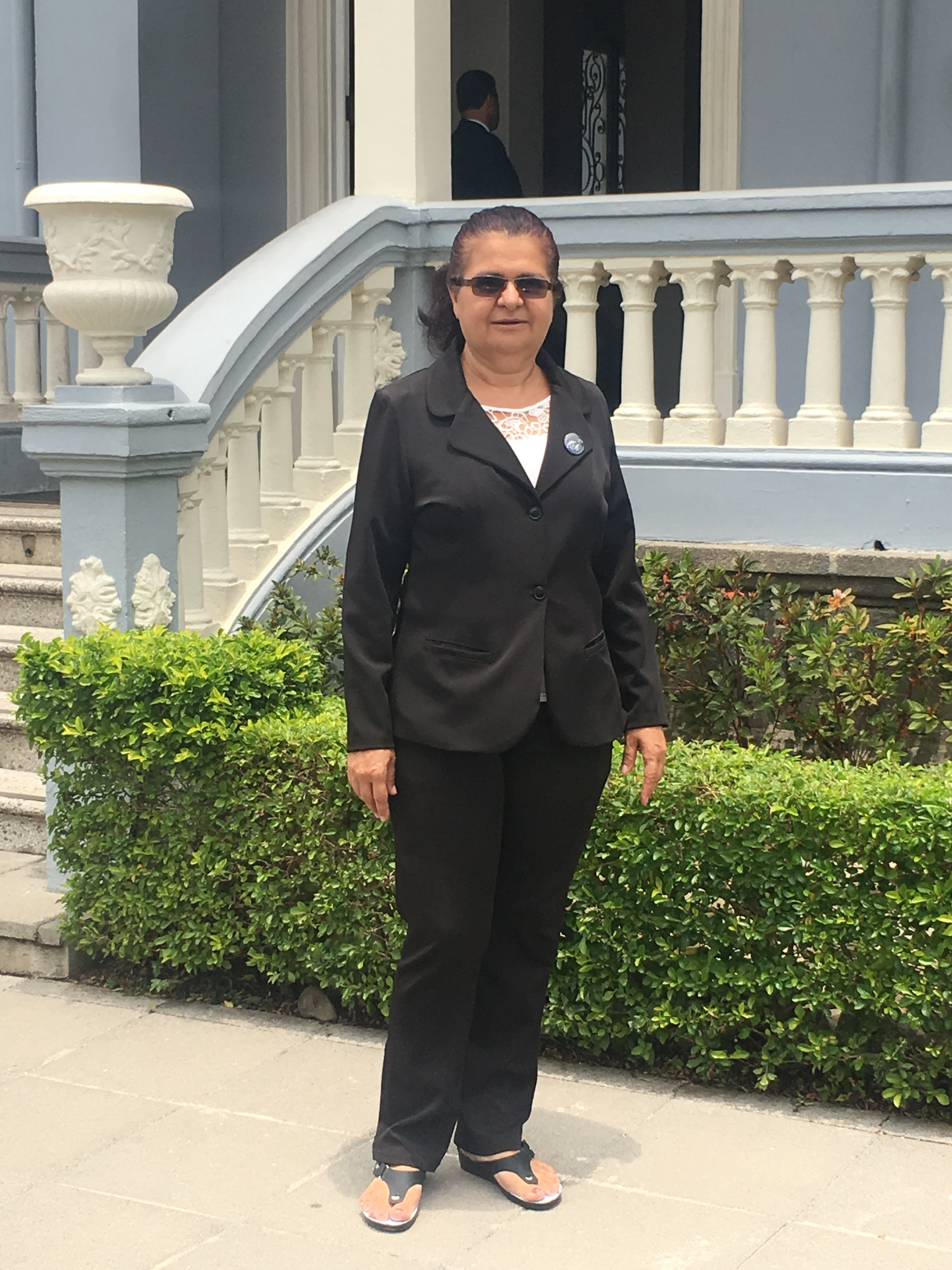
- Fallas in 2016

Member of the Legislative Assembly of Costa Rica
- In office May 1, 2014 – April 30, 2018
- Constituency: Alajuela

Personal details
- Born: 1959 (age 66–67) San Ramón, Costa Rica
- Education: University of Costa Rica
- Occupation: Educator, trade unionist

Ligia Elena Fallas Rodríguez (born 1959) is a Costa Rican politician, trade unionist, and educator. She previously represented Alajuela in the Legislative Assembly of Costa Rica, as a member of the Broad Front party.

== Early life and education ==
Ligia Fallas Rodríguez was born in San Ramón, Costa Rica, in 1959.

After completing secondary school at the Instituto Julio Acosta García, she graduated from the University of Costa Rica with a bachelor's in educational sciences.

== Career ==
In 1987, she began working as an educator under the Ministry of Public Education, and she quickly joined the labor movement as a member of the Costa Rican Education Workers' Union (Sindicato de Trabajadores de la Educación Costarricense, SEC). She served as women's secretary of the SEC, and as organizational secretary of the Costa Rican Confederation of Workers.

From 2010 to 2014, she served on the Municipal Council of San Ramón as part of the local Liga Ramonense coalition. She was also locally active as part of the group Foro de Occidente, which successfully opposed the Brazilian conglomerate OAS Group's concession to expand the roadway between San Ramón and San José.

As a member of the Broad Front party, she served on its provincial committee for Alajuela and on its political commission. In 2014, she was elected as a Broad Front member to represent Alajuela in the Legislative Assembly of Costa Rica. During her time in the legislature, she helped put forth 65 laws, including efforts to establish civil unions for same-sex couples and promote urban agriculture. She was a signatory on two proposals to reform the Legislative Code and two to reform the Constitution. She was also a backer of changes to the Animal Welfare Law. While in the legislature, she became known as a more independent member of her party, frequently clashing with other members over legislative priorities and criticizing the party as insufficiently left-wing.

She completed her legislative term in 2018. At that time, she left the Broad Front and refocused her efforts on her work as an educator in San Ramón. Later that year, she played an active role in the 2018 Costa Rican protests, in which trade unions struck over proposed changes to the tax code.
