= Nidia María Jiménez Vásquez =

Costa Rican educator and politician

Deputy Legislative Assembly of Costa Rica
- In office 2014–2018
- Constituency: Alajuela

Personal details
- Born: Costa Rica
- Party: Citizens' Action Party
- Profession: Professor, principal, political activist

Nidia María Jiménez Vásquez is a Costa Rican educator and politician, serving as a deputy in the Legislative Assembly of Costa Rica for the 2014 to 2018 term. She is a member of the Citizens' Action Party.

Jiménez holds a bachelor's degree in history and geography from the University of Costa Rica and a Master's in science in educational administration from the University of Costa Rica. Jiménez taught high school social science at San Carlos High School and María Inmaculada for 15 years. In addition, she has taught at the University of San José, Florencio del Castillo University, Santa Lucía University, and the University Católica. When she was elected, Jiménez was the principal of the Laboratorio High School in Ciudad Quesada.

She was appointed first pro-secretary of the Legislative Assembly on 1 May 2014.
