= Patricia Mora Castellanos =

Costa Rican sociologist and politician (born 1951)

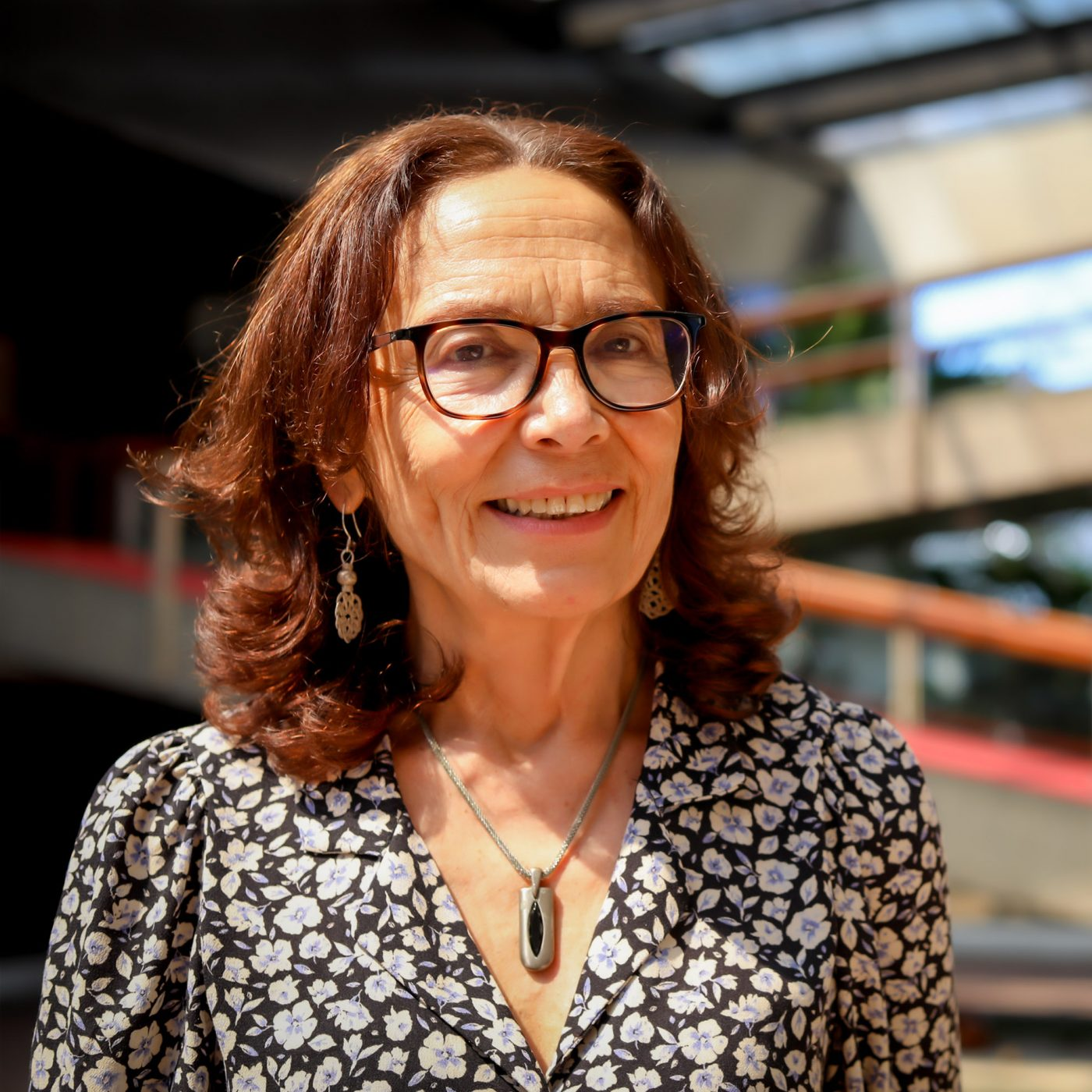
- Official portrait, 2018

President of the Broad Front
- Incumbent
- Assumed office 20 December 2020
- In office 9 March 2013 – 8 May 2018
- Preceded by: José Merino del Río

Minister of Women's Affairs of Costa Rica
- In office 8 May 2018 – 7 December 2020
- President: Carlos Alvarado Quesada
- Preceded by: Alejandra Mora Mora
- Succeeded by: Marcela Guerrero Campos

Deputy of the Legislative Assembly of Costa Rica
- In office 1 May 2014 – 30 April 2018
- Preceded by: Gustavo Arias Navarro
- Succeeded by: Paola Vega Rodríguez
- Constituency: San José (11th Office)

Personal details
- Born: Ana Patricia Mora Castellanos; 13 January 1951 (age 75) San José, Costa Rica
- Party: Broad Front (since 2004)
- Spouse: José Merino del Río (m. 1977; died 2012)
- Children: 2
- Education: University of Costa Rica (MA)
- Occupation: Sociologist; politician; professor

Ana Patricia Mora Castellanos (born 13 January 1951) is a Costa Rican sociologist, professor, and politician who served as Minister of Women's Affairs from 2018 to 2020. A co-founder of the Broad Front, she previously served as a deputy in the Legislative Assembly from 2014 to 2018.

== Biography ==
Patricia Mora Castellanos was born on 13 January 1951, the daughter of Eduardo Mora Valverde and Elena Castellanos Figueroa. She was president of the National Executive Committee of the Broad Front and a deputy for that party, as well as a member of its Political Commission and the Organizing Committee. She was married to José Merino del Río (leader of the Costa Rican left) from 1977 until his death in 2012, and is the daughter of Communist leader Eduardo Mora Valverde. She is the niece of Manuel Mora, founder of the country's Communist Party and one of the fathers of the Social Guarantees of the 1940s. She is also the mother of filmmaker Maricarmen Merino and philosopher Dr. Alejandra Merino.

Mora is a sociologist and was a professor of general studies at the University of Costa Rica. She was a member of the People's Vanguard, Democratic Force, and People's Party, and participated in social struggles against ALCOA, against the Energy Combo Bill, and against the free trade agreement with the United States. She was a founding member of the Broad Front alongside her husband, and was its representative before the Foro de São Paulo as a member of its Political Commission and the executive committee. She was elected deputy for the party in the 2014 general election.

Mora was secretary of the Legislative Assembly's commission that investigated the political scandal known as the "Cementazo", where the loan of $31.5 million from the Banco de Costa Rica to the construction entrepreneur Juan Carlos Bolaños was questioned. The case of alleged influence peddling would involve members of the three Supreme Powers (deputies, the Supreme Court of Justice, and the Presidency).

On 8 May 2018, President Carlos Alvarado Quesada named Mora the country's Minister of Women's Affairs as head of the National Women's Institute (INAMU).
