= José Merino del Río =

Costa Rican politician (1949–2012)

President of the Broad Front
- In office 16 October 2004 – 8 October 2012
- Preceded by: Party established
- Succeeded by: Patricia Mora Castellanos

Deputy of the Legislative Assembly of Costa Rica
- In office 1 May 2006 – 30 April 2010
- Preceded by: Ronaldo Alfaro García
- Succeeded by: Carlos Avendaño Calvo
- Constituency: San José (19th Office)
- In office 1 May 1998 – 30 April 2002
- Preceded by: Gerardo Trejos Salas
- Succeeded by: Federico Malavassi Calvo
- Constituency: San José (18th Office)

Personal details
- Born: José Merino del Río; 12 September 1949 Burgos, Francoist Spain
- Died: 8 October 2012 (aged 63) Havana, Cuba
- Party: Broad Front (2004–2012)
- Other political affiliations: Democratic Force (1992–2006); United People (1978–1992)
- Spouse: Patricia Mora Castellanos (m. 1977)
- Children: 3
- Education: Russian Academy of Sciences (BA); University of Costa Rica (MA)
- Occupation: Political scientist; journalist; sociologist; politician; professor; writer

José Merino del Río (12 September 1949 – 8 October 2012) was a Costa Rican intellectual and politician who served as a deputy in the Legislative Assembly from 1998 to 2002 and from 2006 to 2010. A founder of the Broad Front, he led the party from 2004 until his death in 2012.
