= Erick Rodríguez Steller =

Costa Rican politician (born 1969)

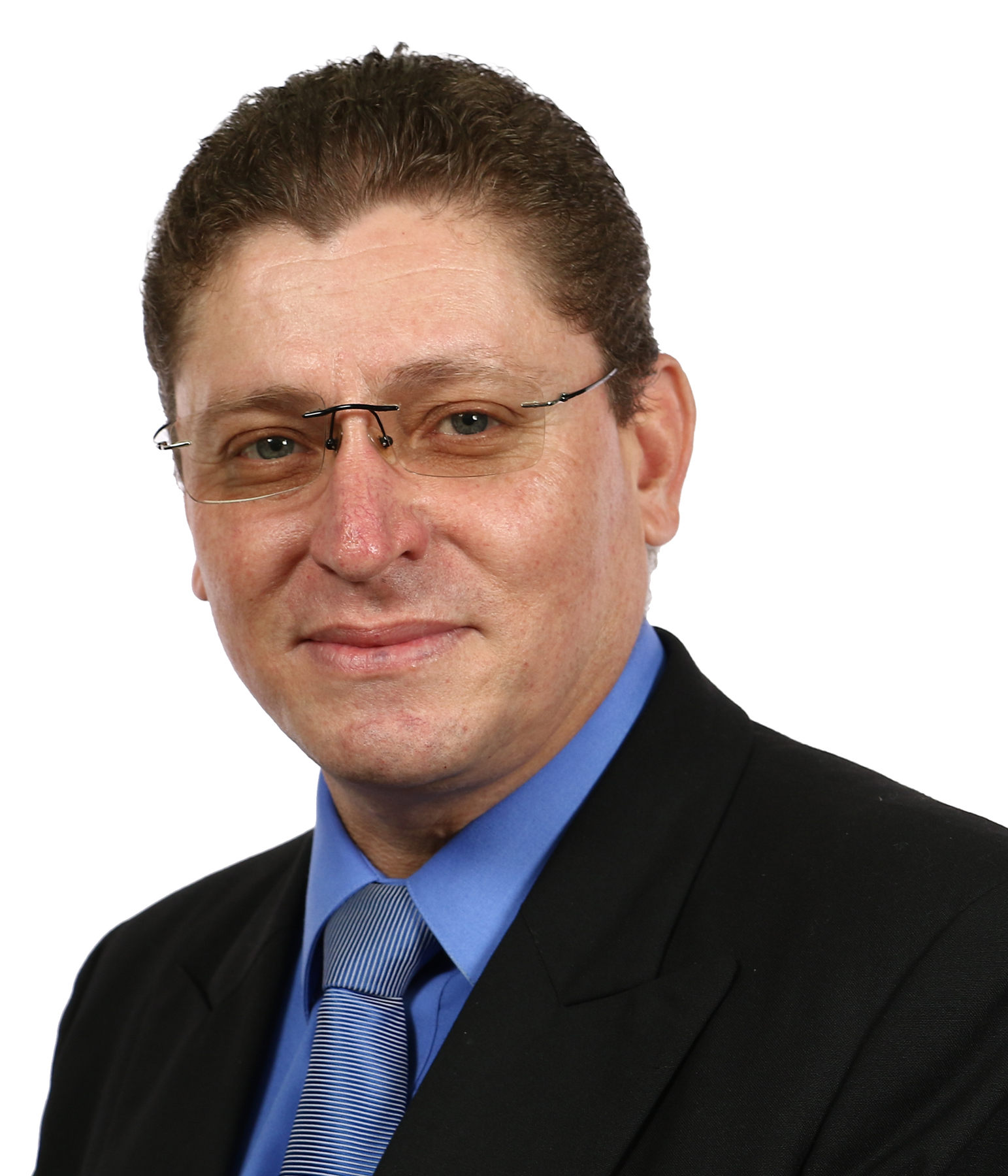
- Steller's parliamentary photo.

Member of the Legislative Assembly of Costa Rica
- In office 2018–2022

Personal details
- Born: April 11, 1969 (age 57) San Ramón, Costa Rica
- Party: New Generation Party
- Other political affiliations: National Integration Party (until 2018); Independent (2018)

Erick Rodríguez Steller (San Ramón, April 11, 1969) is a Costa Rican politician, deputy in Costa Rica in the 2018-2022 period. He was elected by the National Integration Party during Juan Diego Castro Fernández candidacy, but then declared himself an independent deputy, a month before taking office soon after Castro did the same. Later, he would announce his incorporation into the New Generation Party. Steller was one of the only seven deputies who refused to acknowledge the election victory of the US candidate Joe Biden, claiming “that there was suspicion of fraud”.

== Controversies ==
In October 2020, he became known for mocking Costa Rica's health minister, Daniel Salas, upon learning that his father was hospitalized in the middle of the COVID-19 pandemic, the deputy declared: “The superman Salas did not give on his feet, even his father got sick” which generated outrage in the population and some deputies. Days after these comments, Minister Salas's father died.

He also received a lawsuit for sexual and workplace harassment from a female aid in his office. Among the accusations, the aid attributed some insults to the deputy such as: “stupid”, "Mother Teresa", "that the math teacher died on you” and "you are like this because no one fucks with you." She also affirmed that Steller made comments to ridicule her in front of the entire office, emphasizing: “You don't drink, you have no partner, you don't go out, you have no friends, you don't smoke, why are you alive?". The aid also denounced the existence of a WhatsApp chat called "DEATH TO LGBTI AND NICAS" (in reference to Nicaraguans, Costa Rica's main immigrant population) which was originally the chat for the deputy's campaign. For these actions, the ideas of the deputy have been compared with those of the dictator Adolf Hitler, due to the homophobia, misogyny and xenophobia with which he has been linked on various occasions.

In 2020, the Public Ministry reported that it is investigating Steller for the crimes of illicit enrichment and illegal recognition of labor benefits. This is because the legislator charges his office aids for the gasoline assigned to him by the Legislative Assembly.

A year earlier, in June 2019, the deputy was photographed buying beers, while the plenary was discussing the re-election of Justice Paul Rueda. Faced with these photographs, he justified himself by saying that “his vote was not going to be of any importance.”
