= Ruperto Atencio Delgado =

Costa Rican politician

Ruperto Marvin Atencio Delgado

Deputy Legislative Assembly of Costa Rica
- In office 2014–2018
- Constituency: San José, Costa Rica

Personal details
- Born: Costa Rica
- Party: Citizens' Action Party
- Profession: Lawyer, health profession, deputy

Ruperto Marvin Atencio Delgado is a Costa Rican lawyer, health professional, and deputy.

Atencio had a case before the Caja Costarricense del Seguro Social for failure to pay a worker on his farm, although the case has since been resolved.

Atencio worked as an administrative health professional before being elected deputy. He is a member of Sindicato de Profesionales en Ciencias Médicas de la Caja Costarricense de Seguro Social (Siprocimeca) (Union of Scientific Medical Workers of the Costa Rican Social Security System).

He was elected deputy in 2014 and served until 2018.
