= Javier Cambronero Arguedas =

Costa Rican politician and educator

Javier Francisco Cambronero Arguedas

Deputy Legislative Assembly of Costa Rica
- In office 2014–2018
- Constituency: Alajuela

Personal details
- Born: Costa Rica
- Party: Citizens' Action Party
- Profession: Educator, political activist

Javier Francisco Cambronero Arguedas is a Costa Rican educator and politician.

== Education ==
Cambronero holds a Bachelor's, Licentiate, and a Master's of science in educational administration. He worked for the Ministry of Education's western-region branch as the director of the Department of Pedagogical Counseling. Cambronero has also taught at the university level.

== PAC activities and political beliefs ==
Cambronero has been involved with the Citizens' Action Party since 2006. From 2007 to 2009, he served on the Training and Education Commission. In 2008, he was a member of the San Ramón party assembly. Cambronero was a candidate for the mayoral office of San Ramón in 2010.

As a member of PAC, Cabronero opposed the Central American Free Trade Agreement. In addition, he is against genetically modified crops, and against international concessions, such as the San José to San Ramón highway, which is a toll road operated by a Spanish company.

== Deputy ==
Cambronero announced his candidacy for deputy in 2013. Among his stated goals, he wanted a renegotiate the San José to San Ramón highway concession, create a development bank for young professionals, increase agricultural protections in San Ramón, and improve the quality of education. He also wanted to improve the country's economic stability.

== Personal life ==
Cambronero was born on 8 December 1964 to Mario Cambronero Carvajal and Edith Arguedas Madrigal. He has five siblings. He is married to Lilliam Fernández Ramírez and has four children. Cambronero is an active member of the San Ramón area Pastoral Familiar de la Iglesia Católica Romana.
