= Christian Democratic Alliance (Costa Rica) =

Christian Democratic Alliance Alianza Demócrata Cristiana
- Founder: Mario Redondo Poveda
- Founded: 9 November 2012
- Split from: Social Christian Unity Party
- Ideology: Conservatism; Christian democracy Christian right Christian humanism
- Political position: Centre-right to right-wing
- Religion: Evangelicalism
- Colours: Blue and yellow
- Declared inactive: 31 january 2025

Party flag

Website
- http://www.alianzacr.org/

The Christian Democratic Alliance (Alianza Demócrata Cristiana, ADC) is a political party in the Cartago constituency of Costa Rica. It was founded in 2012, and is led by Mario Redondo Poveda, a former president of the Legislative Assembly of Costa Rica and a former member of the Social Christian Unity Party. In the 2014 general elections, Redondo was elected to the only seat in the Legislative Assembly won by the ADC. Another party of the same name was founded in San José but did not participate in the election. According to its statutes, the ADC intends to register at the national level in the future.

In the 2020 municipal election, Mario Redondo, as the ADC nominee, was elected mayor of Cartago.

== Electoral performance ==
=== Presidential ===
Election	Candidate	First round				Second round			
Election	Candidate	Votes	%	Position	Result	Votes	%	Position	Result
2018	Mario Redondo	12,638	0.59%	10th	Lost	—N/a			
2022	Christian Rivera Paniagua	5,697	0.27%	▼18th	Lost	—N/a			

=== Parliamentary ===
Election	Leader	Votes	%	Seats	+/–	Position	Government
2014	Mario Redondo	23,886	1.17%	1 / 57	New	11th	Opposition
2018	Mario Redondo	52,325	2.45%	0 / 57	▼0	▲8th	Extra-parliamentary
2022	Mario Redondo	18,475	0.89%	0 / 57	0	▼17th	Extra-parliamentary
