= Laura María Garro Sánchez =

Costa Rican politician

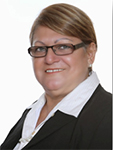

Deputy Legislative Assembly of Costa Rica
- In office 2014–2018
- Constituency: Puntarenas

Personal details
- Born: Costa Rica
- Party: Citizens' Action Party
- Profession: Finance, political activist

Laura María Garro Sánchez is a Costa Rican educator and a former deputy from Puntarenas in the Legislative Assembly.

== Education ==
Garro studied business at the National University of Costa Rica. She earned a Master's in business administration from the Autonomous University of Central America.

== Business career ==
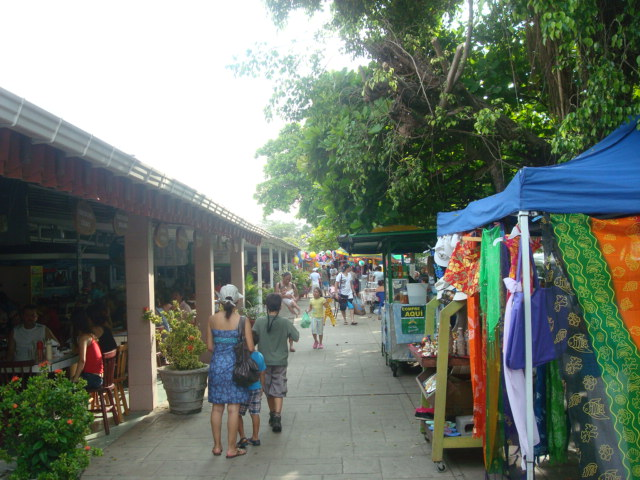
One of Garro's stated goals is to improve tourism in Puntarenas, such as the Tourists' Boulevard

Garro worked for 25 years in public banking and finance.

== Political career ==
Garro is a member of the Citizens' Action Party (PAC for its Spanish initials). She has been a provincial secretary, cantonal president, and party congressional participant.

While running for mayor of Puntarenas in 2006 for PAC, Garro said that she wanted to improve tourist infrastructure in Puntarenas. She also wanted to create better opportunities for citizens. She lost the election.

Garro was elected deputy to the Legislative Assembly in 2014. At the time of her election to deputy, Garro was 62 years old.

She became second pro-secretary of the Legislative Assembly on 1 May 2014.
