= Accessibility without Exclusion Party =

Disability rights political party in Costa Rica

Accessibility Without Exclusion Party Partido Accesibilidad sin Exclusión
- President: Óscar Andrés López Arias
- Secretary-General: Humberto Iván Campos Paniagua
- Vicepresident: Flor María Zamora Álvarez
- Treasurer: Lindor Cruz Jiménez
- Founded: August 21, 2004
- Ideology: Disability rights Social conservatism
- Political position: Right-wing
- Colours: Blue; white

Party flag

Website
- partidopase.blogspot.com

The Accessibility without Exclusion Party (Partido Accesibilidad sin Exclusión, "PASE") is a political party in Costa Rica with a special focus on fighting for the rights of people with disabilities. PASE generally takes socially conservative stances, opposing LGBT rights, in vitro fertilization, and the separation of church and state.

== History ==
In the 2006 general elections, the party won 1.59% of the legislative vote, gaining one seat in the legislature. In 2010, the party surged to 9.17% of the vote, winning four seats in the legislature and entering into coalition with the governing National Liberation Party.

In 2012, members of the party assumed the congressional roles of president, vice president and first secretary after striking a deal with the majority National Liberation Party.

In 2013, the party proposed a bill that would sanction businesses and public places that did not comply with accessibility standards. In October 2013, party member Óscar Andrés López Arias's statement that there was "thin line between consent and rape" drew criticism from feminists.

In 2014, the party's vote fell to 3.95%, and it lost all but one of its seats. In the next election, party's support dropped even further gaining only 0.38% and losing its only seat.

== Electoral performance ==
=== Presidential ===
Election	Candidate	First round				Second round			
Election	Candidate	Votes	%	Position	Result	Votes	%	Position	Result
2010	Óscar Andrés López Arias	35,215	1.91%	5th	Lost	—N/a			
2014	Óscar Andrés López Arias	10,339	0.50%	▼9th	Lost	—N/a			
2018	Óscar Andrés López Arias	7,539	0.35%	▼12th	Lost	—N/a			
2022	Óscar Andrés López Arias	12,418	0.59%	▲11th	Lost	—N/a			

=== Parliamentary ===
Election	Leader	Votes	%	Seats	+/–	Position	Government
2006	Óscar Andrés López Arias	25,690	1.55%	1 / 57	New	9th	Opposition
2010	Óscar Andrés López Arias	171,858	8.81%	4 / 57	▲3	▲4th	Opposition
2014	Óscar Andrés López Arias	81,291	4.11%	1 / 57	▼3	▼8th	Opposition
2018	Óscar Andrés López Arias	46,071	2.16%	0 / 57	▼1	▼10th	Extra-parliamentary
2022	Óscar Andrés López Arias	31,339	1.51%	0 / 57	0	10th	Extra-parliamentary
