= Franklin Corella Vargas =

Costa Rican educator and politician

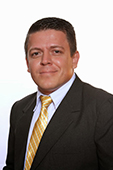

National Director of Community Development
- In office May 8, 2018 – May 8, 2022

Deputy of the Legislative Assembly from Alajuela's 7th seat
- In office May 1, 2014 – April 30, 2018

Personal details
- Born: May 1, 1979 (age 46) San José, Costa Rica
- Party: Citizens' Action Party
- Profession: Educator and political

Franklin Corella Vargas (born May 1, 1979) is a Costa Rican educator and politician who served as National Director of Community Development from May 8, 2018 to May 8, 2022.

== Early political career ==
When he was a boy, Corella watched his father's involvement in the local community government, which influenced him to enter politics. At 23, Corella became the youngest member of the Alajuela City Commission. Corella ran as a member of the Citizens' Action Party (PAC for its Spanish initials).

Corella has a licentiate in science education. He has taught in Talamanca and Alajuela.

== Deputy in Alajuela ==
In 2013 as a thirty-four-year-old, Corella began campaigning for the third deputy position in Alajuela in 2013. He ran as a member of the PAC. While campaigning, Corella continued teaching at El Carmen High School in Alajuela. He claimed that his students were like family and some of them supported Corella during his campaign. Corella won in February 2014 and will occupy the third seat from Alajuela.

Before entering office, Corella toured the area of his constituency, doing volunteer work. Corella is concerned with the image of national politicians. Corella claimed that he is interested in strengthening Costa Rica's democracy, particularly at the grassroots level and opportunities for young people.
