= Marcela Guerrero Campos =

Costa Rican politician

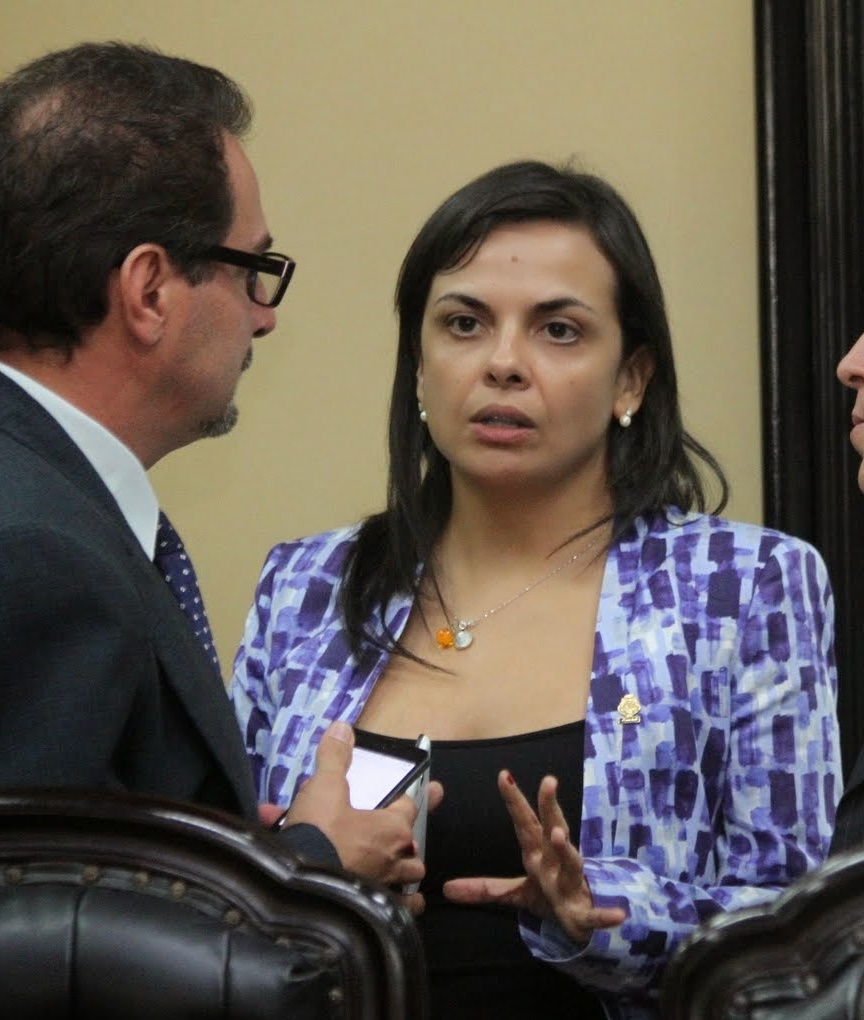
- Marcela Guerrero Campos in 2014

Deputy Legislative Assembly of Costa Rica Minister Ministry for Women of Costa Rica CEO Institute of Promotion and Municipal advice of Costa Rica
- In office 2014–2018
- Constituency: San José

Personal details
- Born: Costa Rica
- Party: Citizens' Action Party
- Profession: Political activist

Marcela Guerrero Campos is the fourth deputy from San José for the 2014 to 2018 assembly. Guerrero is a member of the Citizens' Action Party (PAC for its Spanish initials) and served as their vice-president.

She was Minister of the Instituto Nacional de las Mujeres (INAMU) and Executive President of the Institute for Municipal Promotion and Consulting (IFAM)

Guerrero holds a bachelor's degree in political science from the University of Costa Rica and a Master's in economic development from the National University of Costa Rica. and has a diploma in Energy and Climate Change from the University for Peace

She was a legislative assistant for Juan Carlos Mendoza García from 2002 to 2006.

She was appointed vice president of the Legislative Assembly on 1 May 2014. Guerrero is supportive of union efforts in Costa Rica.
