= Broad Front (Costa Rica) =

Costa Rican political party

Broad Front Frente Amplio
- Abbreviation: FA
- President: Patricia Mora Castellanos
- Secretary-General: Jonathan Jesús Acuña Soto
- Spokesperson: José María Villalta Flórez-Estrada
- Founder: José Merino del Río
- Founded: 16 October 2004; 21 years ago
- Headquarters: Casa Amarilla Barrio Amón
- Ideology: Democratic socialism; Socialism of the 21st century; Social democracy; Progressivism; Socialist patriotism
- Political position: Left-wing
- Regional affiliation: São Paulo Forum
- International affiliation: Progressive International
- Colors: Yellow; Black
- Legislative Assembly: 7 / 57
- Mayors: 1 / 84
- Alderpeople: 8 / 518
- Syndics: 5 / 491
- District councillors: 19 / 1,935
- Intendants: 0 / 8

Party flag

Website
- frenteamplio.org

The Broad Front (Spanish: Frente Amplio, FA) is a Costa Rican left-wing political party that identifies with democratic socialism, social democracy, and environmentalism. Founded in 2004 as a provincial party in San José, it obtained national party status in 2010. According to its statutes, the party advocates democracy, socialism, progressivism, feminism, ecologism, humanism, pacifism, pluralism, and Latin American integration.

Since its establishment, the Broad Front has become one of the principal left-wing forces in Costa Rican politics and has maintained continuous representation in the Legislative Assembly since 2006.

The party is a member of the São Paulo Forum and is generally associated with the Latin American Pink Tide. Its political platform combines support for democratic institutions and civil liberties with calls for stronger social protections, environmental sustainability, and opposition to neoliberal economic policies.

== History ==
The Broad Front first contested a national election in 2006, receiving 1.1% of the vote for the Legislative Assembly and winning a single seat, which was occupied by José Merino del Río. In the 2010 election, the party retained its representation, with José María Villalta Flórez-Estrada elected as its sole deputy. Its presidential candidate that year was Eugenio Trejos Benavides, then rector of the Costa Rica Institute of Technology.

For the 2014 election, the party nominated Villalta as its presidential candidate. His campaign attracted significant attention and, according to several opinion polls, he was at times considered a leading contender, an unusual development for a left-wing candidate in Costa Rica. However, his support declined during the final stages of the campaign amid attacks and negative campaigning from political opponents, particularly the right-wing Libertarian Movement, and the resurgence of the Citizens' Action Party (PAC) under Luis Guillermo Solís, whose improved debate performances attracted many center-left voters.

Villalta ultimately finished third in the presidential election with 17.2% of the vote, behind Johnny Araya Monge of the National Liberation Party and Solís of the PAC. Despite this result, the Broad Front achieved its best legislative performance to date, obtaining 13.1% of votes and increasing its representation in the Legislative Assembly from one seat to nine.

In the 2016 municipal elections, the party won the mayoralty of Barva and participated in successful local alliances with the PAC in Acosta and Montes de Oca.

During the 2014–2018 legislative term, several controversies involving Broad Front deputies received media attention. These included the resignation of Guanacaste deputy and former Catholic priest Ronal Vargas after allegations of sexual harassment, criticism over deputy Ligia Fallas's use of her legislative office for alleged romantic encounters of her advisors, and domestic violence accusations involving two party legislators. The incidents generated internal debate within the party and attracted significant public scrutiny.

In the 2018 general election, the Broad Front nominated deputy Edgardo Araya Sibaja as its presidential candidate. Araya received less than 1% of the vote, and the party's legislative representation was reduced from nine seats to a single deputy, with Villalta once again serving as its sole representative in the Legislative Assembly. For the 2022 election, the party nominated Villalta for a second presidential campaign. He received 8.7% of the presidential vote, while the Broad Front won 8.3% of the congressional vote and increased its representation to six seats.

In 2026, the Broad Front nominated deputy Ariel Robles Barrantes as its presidential candidate. Although Robles obtained only 3.7% of the presidential vote, the party improved its legislative performance, receiving 12.3% of the parliamentary vote and increasing its representation from six to seven seats.

== Electoral performance ==
=== Presidential ===
Election	Candidate	First round				Second round			
Election	Candidate	Votes	%	Position	Result	Votes	%	Position	Result
2010	Eugenio Trejos Benavides	6,822	0.37%	7th	Lost				
2014	José María Villalta Flórez-Estrada	354,479	17.25%	▲3rd	Lost				
2018	Edgardo Araya Sibaja	16,862	0.78%	▼8th	Lost				
2022	José María Villalta Flórez-Estrada	182,789	8.73%	▲6th	Lost				
2026	Ariel Robles Barrantes	96,384	3.76%	▲4th	Lost				

=== Parliamentary ===
Election	Leader	Votes	%	Seats	+/–	Position	Government
2006	No presidential candidate	17,751	1.10%	1 / 57	New	11th	Opposition
2010	Eugenio Trejos Benavides	68.987	3.66%	1 / 57	0	▲7th	Opposition
2014	José María Villalta Flórez-Estrada	221,780	13.09%	9 / 57	▲8	▲3rd	Opposition
2018	Edgardo Araya Sibaja	84,437	3.95%	1 / 57	▼8	▼7th	Opposition
2022	José María Villalta Flórez-Estrada	172,961	8.33%	6 / 57	▲5	▲6th	Opposition
2026	Ariel Robles Barrantes	313,868	12.33%	7 / 57	▲1	▲3rd	Opposition
