= Confederación Unitaria de Trabajadores =

Confederación Unitaria de Trabajadores (CUT) may refer to:

- Confederación Unitaria de Trabajadores (Costa Rica)
- Confederación Unitaria de Trabajadores del Perú
