= Public-sector trade union =

A public-sector trade union (or public-sector labor union) is a trade union which primarily represents the interests of employees within public sector or governmental organizations.

== By country ==
=== Costa Rica ===
In the late 1800s, trade unions first appeared to support workers in a variety of urban and industrial jobs. After facing violent repression, such as during the 1934 United Fruit Strike, unions gained more power following the 1948 Costa Rican Civil War, and public sector unions appeared. Previous administrations and assesmblies paid very little attention to Costa Rica's trade unions;, however when the Luis Guillermo Solís and the 2014 legislative assembly took office, Solís and eight members of the Citizens' Action Party and Broad Front promised to listen to unions. Libertarian Otto Guevara expressed concern. Today, Costa Rican unions are strongest in the public sector, including the fields of education and medicine. There is also a strong presence in agricultural sectors for unions. In general, Costa Rican unions support government regulation of the banking, medical, and education fields, as well as improved wages and working conditions.

One important issue for public sector unions is passage of the Código Procesal Laboral (Procedural Labor Law), which former president Laura Chinchilla vetoed. If passed, Chinchilla said it would allow emergency service workers, such as police, medical service staff and doctors to strike. President Luis Guillermo Solís said that the issue of the Procedural Labor Law should be finalized within his first year in office. Legislative Assembly president Henry Mora Jiménez, also supported the law, as do the public sector unions.

=== Europe ===
There are public-sector trade unions in Europe that negotiate agreements between public employees and the institutions for which they work. In 2010, severe financial crises forced several governments to cut back on wages and benefits in austerity measures, leading to protests, most notably in Greece. In Greece, a one-day protest was held because of requirements placed by the EU on Greece's public spending.
