= Trade unions in Costa Rica =

- National organization(s): CMTC, CGT, CTRN, CUT
- Total union membership: 241,000 (2015)
- Density: 15.5% (2015)

International Labour Organization
- Costa Rica is a member of the ILO

Convention ratification
- Freedom of Association: 2 June 1960
- Right to Organise: 2 June 1960

Trade unions in Costa Rica advocate for the rights of workers in Costa Rica. Dating back to the late 1800s, labor unions in the country have been a political force. They remain active in political and social life for many Costa Ricans.

== History ==
=== Early organizations ===
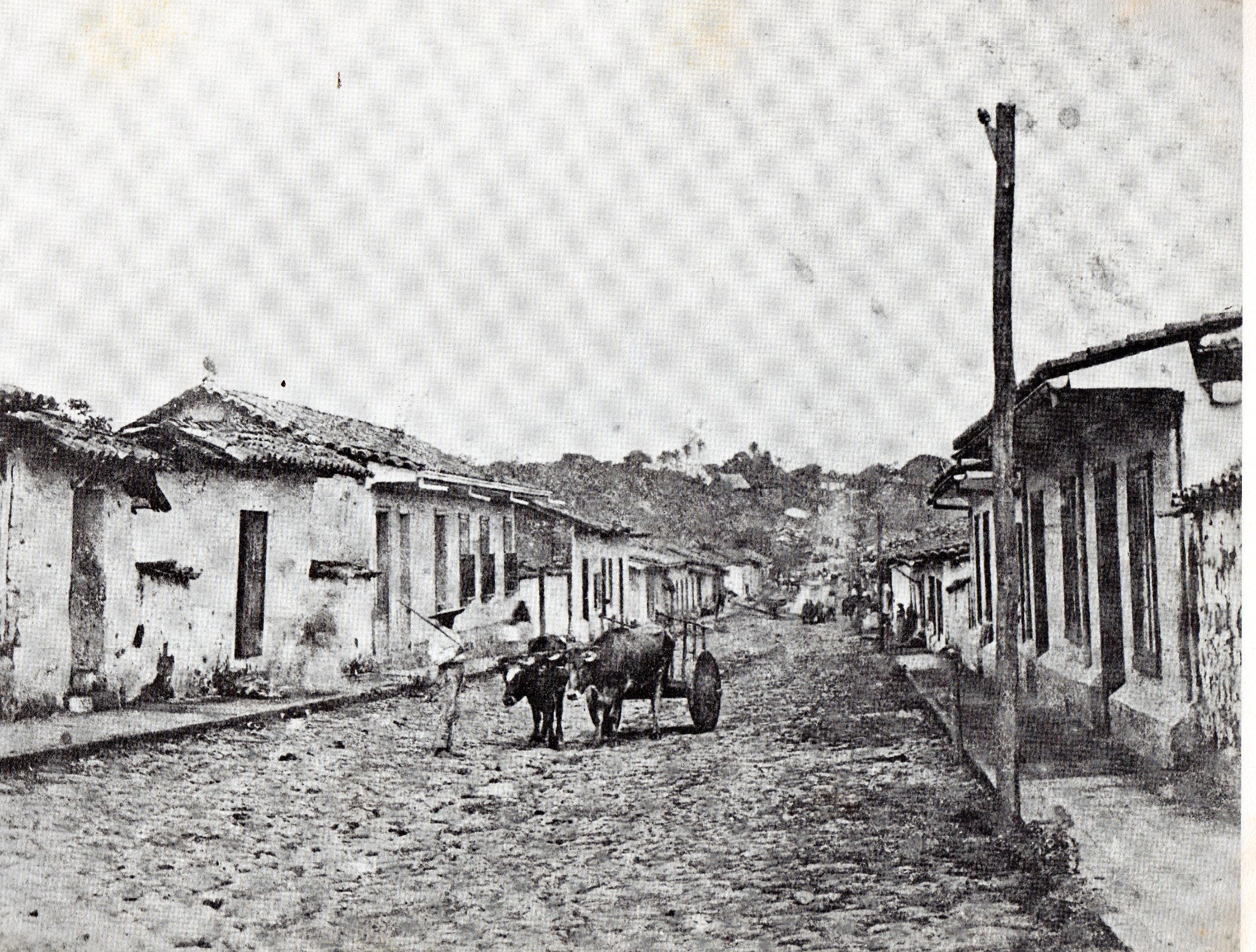
Cities like San José (1885) were home to the first organized labor movements in Costa Rica

During the late 1800s, there were tremendous tensions with workers and managers building the railroads in Costa Rica. While these tensions led to violence against the Jamaican and Chinese workers, they did not lead to the creation of labor unions. Labor unions in Costa Rica began to develop in the 1880s, often being initiated as guilds. During this time, large scale agricultural production developed in Costa Rica, spurred largely by coffee exports. One of the first labor unions in Costa Rica, the Mutual Aid Society, was founded by Catholic priest Francisco Calvo.

With the support of Monsignor Bernardo Augusto, the Bishop of San José, who wrote a pastoral letter called "Fair Day for Laborers and Artisans," many Costa Ricans began to consider the wages and conditions of the country's workforce. Augusto created a group called the "Catholic Union," which organized workers to promote spiritual and social welfare. The first strike in Costa Rica occurred in 1888, involving Italian laborers working on the railroad. It was legal and recognized by the government.

Mutual aid societies gave way to unions that advocated political lobbying rather than social welfare. In 1901, the League of Workers was created. Later, just before the Great Depression, political unions in Costa Rica attempted to assert political pressure, especially after the advent of the Popular Vanguard Party. Omar Dengo, for whom the National University of Costa Rica's main campus is named, and others organized Costa Rica's first International Workers' Day celebrations in 1913, the same year that the General Workers Confederation was founded. These groups played a crucial role in passing Alfredo González Flores' tax reforms.

During this time, members of the Catholic Church often conflicted as to whether or not to support unions. Whereas priest John G. Stork discouraged church officials from getting involved in political disputes, particularly with labor unions, priest Jorge Volio actively encouraged participation. Volio helped organized the Society of Craftsman in 1916. He pointed to the Encyclical document Rights and Duties of Capital and Labor to justify his support for unions.

=== Growing political pressure and the 1934 United Fruit Banana Strike ===
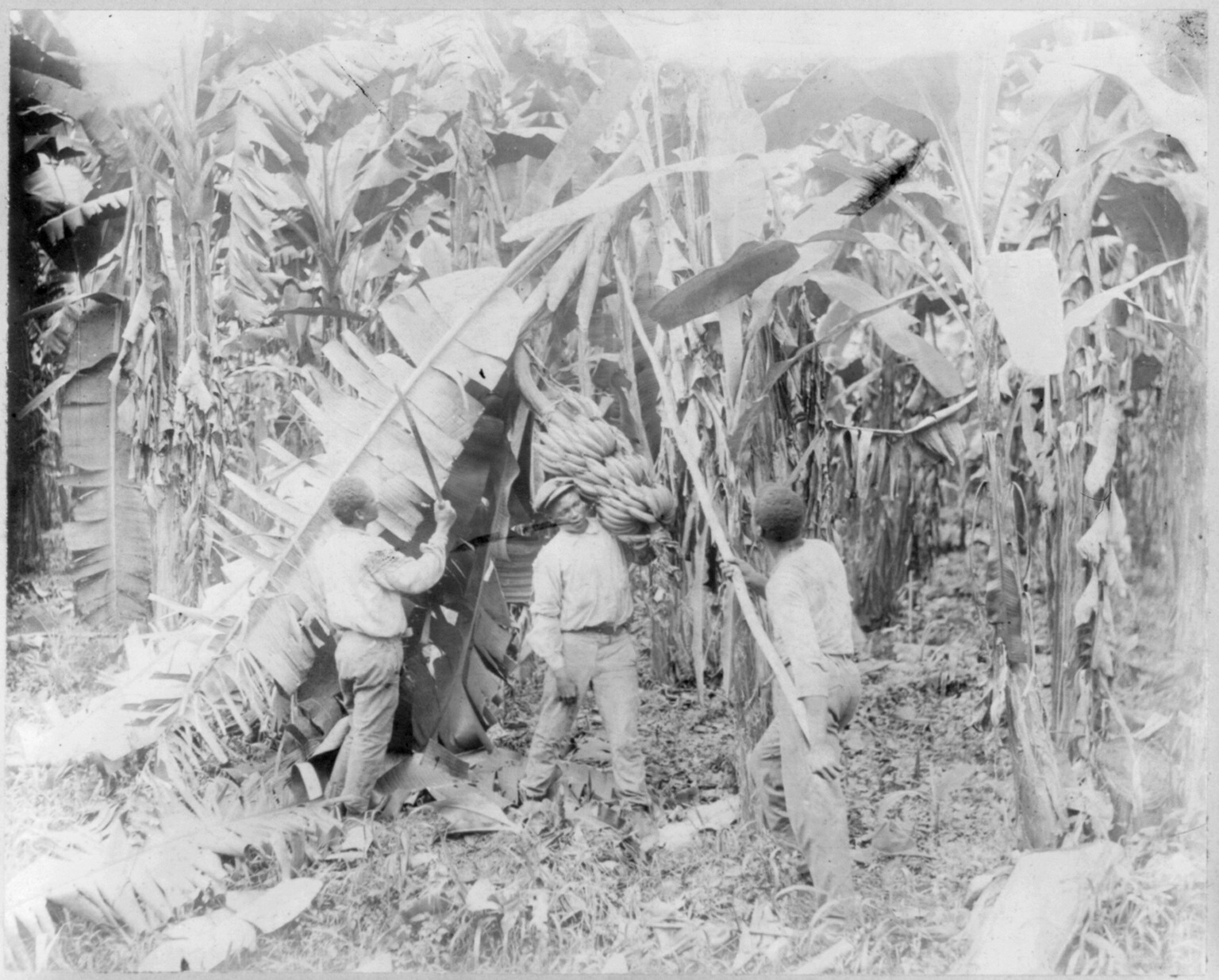
Banana workers in Limón between 1910 and 1920

Dictator Federico Tinoco Granados, working on behalf of the ruling families of Costa Rica, attempted to do away with the growing labor movement. In 1920, the first general strike occurred in the major urban areas. Encouraged largely by the carpenters and furniture makers' unions, the workers initially demanded an eight-hour workday and an increase in wages. When their demands were ignored, other unions joined their cause, including the public workers from the Pacific Railroad and the National Liquor Factory, as well as private typists, sailors, and others. The transitional government, weak from deposing Tinoco, settled quickly while private companies took more time to draw concessions from the workers.

In 1923, many unions and labor groups joined to form the Costa Rican Federation of Workers. In 1929, the Revolutionary Labor Cultural Association (Asociación Revolucionaria de Cultura Obrera) was founded. Advocating for the rights of workers in study groups, ARCO was a direct predecessor to the Communist Party of Costa Rica, both of which frequently clashed with police during violent demonstrations.

Although they had frequently protested in the past, banana workers staged one of Costa Rica's most significant strikes in 1934. Previous banana strikes and protests had been repressed by the national government on behalf of United Fruit Company. Because of the previous repression, members of the Atlantic Workers Congress met in secret to sign documents demanding a minimum wage that would not be given in company coupons, six hour shifts, recognition of injury law, and generally improved working conditions. Among the Atlantic Workers Congress was Carlos Luis Fallas, who would later write "Mamita Yunai," based on his experiences working for United Fruit.

A national strike began on 9 August 1934 involving more than 30 separate unions. United Fruit immediately tried to divide workers in different professions and regions along ethnic lines, even forcibly deporting workers to other countries. The unions and the company came to an agreement that ended the strike on 28 August; however, United Fruit did not follow through. Instead, the company began a public relations campaign to brand the strike as a communist insurrection, which the government accepted. Nonetheless, The Great Banana Strike was an important step that would eventually lead to the formation of effective Trade unions in Costa Rica since the company was required to sign a collective agreement with its workers in 1938.

Unions went on strike again, but the leaders of the Atlantic Workers Congress were imprisoned and the strike ended. The following year, the government passed several laws that implemented many of the workers' demands. The experiences of the 1934 United Fruit Strike gave rise to the '40s Generation, a Costa Rican literary movement that emphasized social, economic, and labor reforms.

=== Labor and the Costa Rican Civil War ===
In 1940, Rafael Angel Calderon Guardia came to power, frequently sided with companies over workers, and failed to deliver on his campaign promises. Like Volio, Bishop Victor Manuel Sanabria Martínez encouraged workers to organize for their betterment, also citing the Rights and Duties of Capital and Labor.

With the Great Depression damaging Costa Rica's export market, tensions grew. The government of Teodoro Picado Michalski harshly repressed labor organizations. The Costa Rican Civil War in 1948 was fueled partly by discontent among works and labor unions. Picado had violently repressed a general strike in San José, greatly increasing tensions. When the Civil War broke out following Otilio Ulate's annulled victory, labor leaders were labeled communists and jailed.

After the Civil War, the Asociación Nacional de Empleados Públicos (National Association of Public Employees) was founded to protect the interests of workers in the new government. In 1998, ANEP became the Asociación Nacional de Empleados Públicos y Privados (National Association of Public and Private Employees). The change was motivated by a fiscal crisis during which large sectors of the public workforce were privatized. ANEP is the largest union in Costa Rica.

In 1966, the Sindicato Industrial de Trabajadores Eléctricos y de Telecomunicaciones (Electric and Telecommunications Workers Industrial Union) was founded. SITET signed the first collective bargaining agreement in 1967. SITET would later help other state enterprise workers organize unions as well. In 1969, the Sindicato de Trabajadoras y Trabajadores de la Educación Costarricense (Costa Rican Educators Union) became the first educators' union to include teachers from all grade levels. Prior to SEC, there had been a legally mandated associations run by the national government, but no unions. One of SEC's first orders of business was to professionalize educators by having them licensed to teach.

=== Legal impediments in the 1980s and resurgence in the 1990s ===
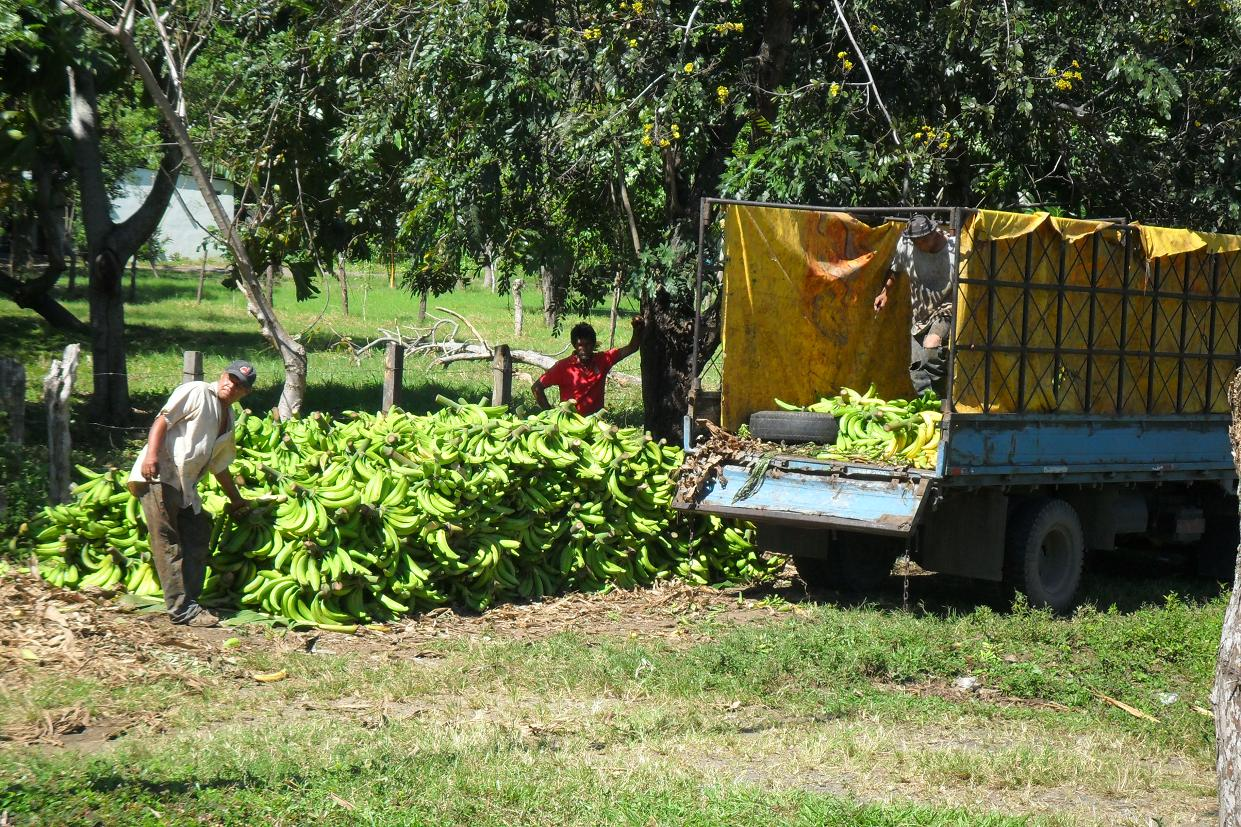
Nearly all banana workers in Costa Rica are organized in unions

The 1980s were a decade of trouble for many Costa Rican unions. Many companies, supported by the administration of Óscar Arias, tried to dissolve and undercut private sector unions. Using tactics such as bypassing collective bargaining agreements and ignoring union requests, the banana unions were hit particularly hard. As a fiscal crisis took hold of the country, in large part due to the Arias' austerity measures, private and public sector unions tried to regroup.

Because of the austerity measures taken in the 1980s and 1990s, labor unions in Costa Rica underwent a period of increased activity as poverty and unemployment increased. Private sector unions developed in the textile, construction, tourism, and transportation industries, as well as among sugarcane farmers. The national government confronted a fiscal crisis after the presidency of Arias. When Rafael Ángel Calderón Fournier took over, his administration began withdrawing benefits to public sector workers and consolidating government departments.

Public sector unions, among other interests, were concerned about the austerity measures which failed to improve the economic problems of most people. Both administrations tried to restrict the rights of unions. Problems became so difficult for public sector workers that unions took their cases to the International Labour Organization.

Despite their resurgence in the 1990s, many private sector unions faced repression and opposition. Specific instances include the 1994 Korean-owned Kokomerica case in which workers denounced union repression, unsanitary work conditions, non-payment of wages, and other issues to the Ministry of Labor. When Carteco's workers at the SARET free-trade zone in Alajuela Province complained of mistreatment and then tried to form a union, the owner from the United States fired all workers. Workers at another company located in SARET complained that their US owners created terrible working conditions, they contacted the Asociación Nacional de Empleados Públicos y Privados (National Association of Public and Private Employees). The managers of the plant followed through on threats to fire workers, reduce wages, and create black lists. The Ministry of Labor and a Catholic priest intervened, and the company rehired the workers.

In 1997, when workers at Chiquita Brands International, another US-owned company, tried to unionize and complained of mistreatment, their salaries were reduced and many employees were fired, while pregnant women were assigned to field work, and black lists were sent to other companies. Another case of illegal mistreatment and repression in the 1990s include the US-owned Semicon-Tek, the German-owned Iguana Park case, the case of Nicaraguan workers trying to affiliate with the Sindicato de Trabajadores de Plantaciones Agrícolas (Agricultural Plantation Workers Union) and then being fired in 1994. Other cases of union repression include the Talmana case of 1992, the Ticatex case in 1994, the Conoplast case in 1994, the Autotransports Sabana case in 1994, and the Cocorisa case from 1994 to 1996.

=== Opposition to free trade ===
In the 2000s, unions were often at odds with the neo-liberal politics of the two ruling parties, National Liberation Party (PLN for its Spanish initials) and the Social Christian Unity Party (PUSC for its Spanish initials).

During the 2007 Central American Free Trade Agreement referendum, labor unions organized to encourage its rejection. While ultimately unsuccessful, organizers were able to put their agendas into the forefront of Costa Rican politics again, saying that free trade should not only standardize financial and trading regulations, but also labor law.

=== 2014 Presidential election ===
During the 2014 Costa Rican general election, labor unions overwhelmingly put their support behind Solís and other candidates from the Citizens' Action Party (PAC for its Spanish initials), like Marlene Madrigal Flores and Henry Mora Jiménez. With the help of unions, PAC broke the 66-year rule of PLN and PUSC, electing Solís with the largest margin of victory in a Costa Rican presidential election.

=== Recreational services ===
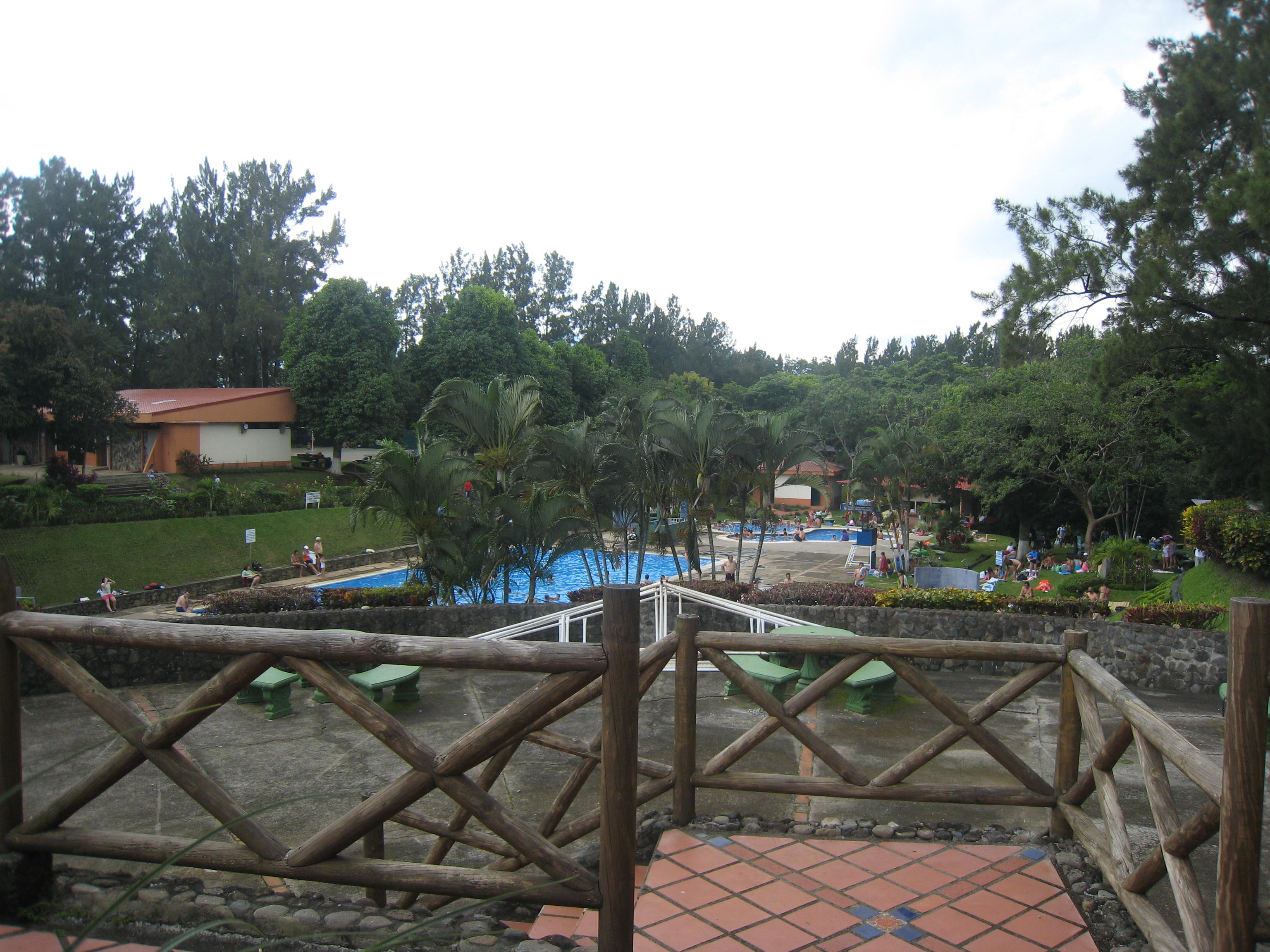
Campus of COLYPRO

While the primary focus of Costa Rican labor unions is to advocate for the rights and benefits of workers, many labor unions also operate recreational complexes for their members. Such recreational centers serve to provide a social outlet for members. They may include facilities such as swimming pools, soccer grounds, and small restaurants. Like union halls, the recreational complexes also organize dances, games, and sports tournaments, and members can use the facilities for private occasions, like weddings or parties.

== Recent activities ==
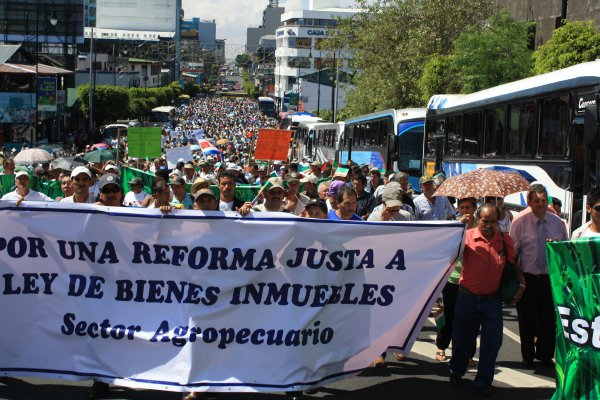
Costa Rican agricultural unions demonstration, January 2011

=== Current issues for unions ===
Labor unions are active in both the public and private spheres. Their major concerns today are not unlike those of the past. Unions want salaries increased to reflect inflation, regulation of public commodities, and a stronger Caja Costarricense del Seguro Social (Costa Rican Social Security Department). Many labor unions are also asking for increased environmental regulation, and increased oversight of cooperative banks. In addition, unions are general against privatization of education, police enforcement, and medical services, and support more measures to improve health conditions, food safety, education, housing, and improved salaries.

Previous administrations and assemblies paid very little attention to Costa Rica's trade unions;, however when the 2014 legislative assembly took office, eight members of the Citizens' Action Party and Broad Front promised to listen to the requests of unions. Libertarian Otto Guevara expressed concern.

One important issue for Costa Rica unions is passage of the Código Procesal Laboral (Procedural Labor Law), something former president Laura Chinchilla vetoed. Chinchilla claimed that if passed, it would allow emergency service workers, such as police, medical service staff and doctors to go on strike. President Luis Guillermo Solís said that the issue of the Procedural Labor Law should be resolved within one year. Henry Mora Jiménez, President of the Legislative Assembly for the 2014–2018 term, said the Law should be passed. ANEP's president called the law's possible passage "exciting."

=== Recent labor actions ===
Trade unions in Costa Rica have protested regarding neo-liberal policies in general. Focusing particularly on Laura Chinchilla's administration, union members staged a march in 2014 during which they demanded more respect for medical workers, port workers, and teachers. The march took place in 12 cities throughout the country. Chinchilla responded by saying that the marches went against the spirit "dialogue and civility" in the country.

Despite their visibility, workers still face many problems when trying to form a union. When workers for Produfrutas del Atlantico, a Limón pineapple plantation, tried to join a union, workers and their families were immediately fired.

Through 2013 and 2014, the Sindicato de Trabajadores de Japdeva (SINTRAJAP) (Japdeva Workers Union) protested a proposed expansion of the Moín Port in Limón. The port, to be built by Dutch firm APM Terminals, would have an exclusive concession to manage container shipping, something SINTRAJAP opposed. Other unions joined SINTRAJAP in protests of solidarity. In April 2014, the union demanded environmental protections for Moín River running next to the port, saying that wildlife would be damaged if Japdeva (a port authority on the Caribbean coast) built a new highway connecting the proposed port to another highway, which would cause Moín River to be diverted. In June 2014, the Supreme Court of Costa Rica agreed with SINTRAJAP, declaring that an environmental impact survey would need to be conducted before any construction began.

In May 2014, teachers working for the Ministry of Public Education went on strike because they did not receive pay under former President Laura Chinchilla's administration for more than a month, some for more than four months, even when deductions were being made from the teachers' bank accounts. Chinchilla's Minister of Education, Leanardo Garnier, claimed that the reason for non-payment was a technical error caused by the implementation of a new system for depositing money into employees' bank accounts and that nothing could be done to pay them, something the unions rejected.

Organizers say that the walk-off, which includes marches and rallies in urban centers, will last until back pay is given. Current President Luis Guillermo Solís, who "inherit[ed]" the issue, expressed support for the walk-off. Teachers immediately met with the new Minister of Education, Sonia Marta Mora, but failed to come to an agreement. Solís' administration came to an agreement with Costa Rican banks that plans for 13,600 teachers to receive back pay, as well as making arrangements for teachers to pay their debts, mortgages, and so forth.

In the third week of the strike, other unions threatened to turn the education strike into a general strike and in the fourth week, unions met with members of the Catholic Church, including Archbishop José Rafael Quirós, in order to help them find common ground with the government. With the church, the unions came up with a proposal to have the Ministry of Education cancel the new system for depositing money into bank accounts and have all teachers register in order to receive their back-pay. The new Minister of Education said that negotiations would not occur until the teachers returned to their classes; however, a day later, the agreement was approved, allowing teachers to return.

== List of labor unions ==
Name (Spanish)	Name (English)	Notes	Website
Asociación Nacional de Educadores (ANDE)	National Association of Educators	President Gilberto Cascante,	ANDE.cr
Asociación de Profesores de Segunda Enseñanza (APSE)	Association of Secondary School Teachers	President Mélida Cedeño, founded 1954	APSE.or.cr
Colegio de Licenciados y Profesores (COLYPRO)	College of Licentiates and Professors	President Félix Ángel Salas Castro	COLYPRO.com
Sindicato de Trabajadores de la Educación Costarricense (SEC)	Costa Rican Educators Union	President Gílberth Díaz, founded 1969	SECCR.com
Asociación Nacional de Empleados Públicos y Privados (ANEP)	National Association of Public and Private Employees	Secretary General Albino Vargas Barrantes, founded 1958	ANEP.or.cr
Sindicato Industrial de Trabajadores Eléctricos y de Telecomunicaciones (SITET)	Electric and Telecommunications Workers Industrial Union	Secretary General Sergio Saborio Brenes, founded 1966	SITET.or.cr
Sindicato de Trabajadores de Plantaciones Agrícolas (SITRAP)	Agricultural Plantation Workers Union	Secretary General Didier Leitón Valverde, founded 1990	SITRAP.net
Sindicato de Trabajadores de la Empresa Privada y Pública (SITEPP)	Private and Public Businesses Workers Union	President Dalys Ramírez Zamora, founded 1984	
Sindicato Nacional de Periodistas	National Union of Journalists	Secretary General Yamileth Alfaro Mora, founded 1969	COLPER.or.cr
Colegio de Profesionales en Orientación	Guidance Professionals Association	President Carmen Frías Quesada	CPOCR.org
Sindicato de Profesionales en Ciencias Médicas de la Caja Costarricense de Seguro Social (SIPROCIMECA)	Union of Professional Medical Doctors of the Costa Rican Social Security Department	Secretary General Marvin Atencio Delgado, founded 1953	SIPROCIMECA.com
Sindicato de Ingenieros y Profesionales del ICE, RACSA y CNFL (SIICE)	ICE, RACSA, and CNFL Engineering and Professional Union	President Mayid Halabí Fauaz, founded 1971	SIICECR.org
Confederación de Trabajadores Rerum Novarum (CTRN)	Costa Rican Confederation of Workers	President Lenin Hernández Navas, founded 1991	RERUMNOVARUM
Sindicato de la Unión de Empleados del Banco de Costa Rica (UNEBANCO)	Union of Costa Rican Bank Employees	Secretary General Róger Muñoz Mata	UNEBANCO.com
Confederación Unitaria de Trabajadores (CUT)	United Workers Federation	Secretary General Sol Salas Morales, founded 1980	
Central del Movimiento de Trabajadores Costarricenses (CMTC)	Central Movement of Costa Rican Workers	President Olman Chinchilla, founded 1964, reorganized 1994	CMTCCR.org
Sindicato de Trabajadores de la Junta de Administración Portuaria y Desarrollo Económico de la Vertiente Atlántica (SINTRAJAP)	Union of JAPDEVA (Atlantic Coast Port Authority and Economic Development Board) Workers	Secretary General Antonio Wells Medina, founded 1972	
Sindicato de Trabajadores Petroleros, Químicos y Afines (SITRAPEQUIA)	Union of Oil Workers, Chemists, and Allies	Secretary General Manuel Rodríguez Acevedo, founded 1969	SITRAPEQUIA.or.cr
Sindicato Patriótico de la Educación 7 de Agosto (SINPAE)	Patriotic Education Union	Secretary General Cynthia Crespo Campos, founded 1995	
Sindicato Unitario Nacional de Trabajadores de la Construcción y Similares (SUNTRACS)	Construction and Similars National Unitary Workers Union	Secretary General Miguel Marín Calderón, founded 1943	
Asociación Nacional de Trabajadores de la Empresa Privada (ANTEP)	National Association of Private Business Employees	Secretary General Ricardo Chavarría Castro, founded 1987	
Sindicato de Trabajadores del Grupo Gfours(SINTRAGFOURS)	Gfours Group Workers Union	Secretary General Vladimir Torres Montiel, founded 2013	
Unión de Trabajadores Agrícolas de Cartago (UTRAC)	Cartago Agricultural Workers Union	Secretary General Tarcisio Soto Bermúdez, founded 1994	
Asociación de Trabajadores de Fertilizantes (ATFE)	Association of Fertilizer Workers	Secretary General Leslier Mendoza Martínez, founded 1969	
