= CMTC =

CMTC may refer to:

- Canadian Manoeuvre Training Centre, a Canadian Army training formation located at CFB Wainwright, Alberta.
- Cutis marmorata telangiectatica congenita, a rare congenital vascular disorder often affecting the skin first described by Cato van Lohuizen.
- Central del Movimiento de Trabajadores Costarricenses, a trade union centre in Costa Rica
- Cytoplasmic Microtubule Complex, the network of microtubules within the cytoplasm of a cell.
- Citizens' Military Training Camp, summer military training programs of the United States, 1921-1940
