= Fernando Sánchez =

Fernando Sánchez may refer to:

- Fernando Sánchez de Castro (1241–1275), Aragonese infante and crusader
- Fernando Sánchez de Tovar (died 1384), Castilian soldier and admiral
- Fernando Sánchez Polack (1920–1982), Spanish actor
- Fernando Sánchez (designer) (1935–2006), Belgian fashion designer
- Fernando Sánchez Dragó (born 1936), Spanish writer and television host
- Fernando Sánchez (footballer) (born 1971), Spanish football manager and former footballer
- Fernando Sánchez Campos (born 1974), Costa Rican politician
