= Heredia (Legislative Assembly constituency) =

Constituency in Costa Rica

- Constituency for the Legislative Assembly of Costa Rica
- Location of Heredia within Costa Rica
- Province: Heredia
- Population: 479,117 (2022)
- Electorate: 355,738 (2022)
- Area: 2,663 km^{2} (2024)

Current Constituency
- Created: 1949
- Seats: List: 6 (2014–present); 5 (1986–2014); 4 (1978–1986); 3 (1966–1978); 4 (1962–1966); 3 (1953–1962); 5 (1949–1953)
- Deputies: List: Ada Gabriela Acuña Castro (PPSD); Jonathan Acuña Soto (FA); Horacio Martín Alvarado Bogantes (PUSC); Gilberto Arnoldo Campos Cruz (PLP); Kattia Rivera Soto (PLN); Pedro Rojas Guzmán (PLN)

Heredia is one of the seven multi-member constituencies of the Legislative Assembly, the national legislature of Costa Rica. The constituency was established in 1949 when the Legislative Assembly was established by the modified constitution imposed by the Figueres dictatorship. It is conterminous with the province of Heredia. The constituency currently elects six of the 57 members of the Legislative Assembly using the closed party-list proportional representation electoral system. At the 2022 general election it had 355,738 registered electors.

== Electoral system ==
Heredia currently elects six of the 57 members of the Legislative Assembly using the closed party-list proportional representation electoral system. Seats are allocated using the largest remainder method using the Hare quota (cociente). Only parties that receive at least 50% of the Hare quota (subcociente) compete for remainder seats. Any seats remaining unfilled after allocation using the quotient system are distributed amongst parties that surpassed the subcociente, is descending order of their total votes in the constituency. The latter process is repeated until all the seats in the constituency are filled.

== Election results ==
=== Summary ===
Election	United People PU / IU / CC2000 / PASO			Broad Front FA			Citizens' Action PAC			National Republican PRN / PR / PRI / PC			National Liberation PLN / PSD			Social Christian Unity PUSC / CU / PDC			National Unification PUN / PUN			National Integration PIN			Libertarian Movement PML			Social Democratic Progress PPSD			National Restoration PRN		
Election	Votes	%	Seats	Votes	%	Seats	Votes	%	Seats	Votes	%	Seats	Votes	%	Seats	Votes	%	Seats	Votes	%	Seats	Votes	%	Seats	Votes	%	Seats	Votes	%	Seats	Votes	%	Seats
2022	494	0.21%	0	24,672	10.64%	1	5,457	2.35%	0				60,023	25.89%	2	26,340	11.36%	1				1,096	0.47%	0	1,067	0.46%	0	32,371	13.96%	1	4,822	2.08%	0
2018				11,418	4.86%	0	49,257	20.95%	2				44,772	19.05%	2	42,063	17.89%	1				16,603	7.06%	0	4,659	1.98%	0				41,773	17.77%	1
2014				28,053	12.74%	1	69,360	31.49%	2				52,559	23.86%	2	20,149	9.15%	1				641	0.29%	0	16,682	7.57%	0				10,263	4.66%	0
2010				9,523	4.77%	0	38,143	19.10%	2				73,929	37.02%	2	14,510	7.27%	0				950	0.48%	0	27,766	13.90%	1				7,953	3.98%	0
2006	684	0.41%	0				51,324	30.64%	2				60,910	36.36%	3	13,859	8.27%	0				1,308	0.78%	0	15,079	9.00%	0						
2002	2,026	1.35%	0				41,606	27.65%	2				36,523	24.27%	1	41,462	27.55%	1				1,491	0.99%	0	16,122	10.71%	1						
1998	1,459	1.12%	0										46,676	35.85%	2	51,036	39.20%	3				4,188	3.22%	0	3,191	2.45%	0						
1994													61,462	45.93%	3	54,764	40.93%	2															
1990	5,121	4.38%	0										50,119	42.91%	2	54,744	46.87%	3															
1986	4,116	4.08%	0										48,715	48.32%	3	42,457	42.11%	2															
1982	6,679	8.34%	0										43,264	54.03%	2	25,974	32.44%	2															
1978	6,339	9.51%	0										27,002	40.50%	2	29,772	44.66%	2	1,478	2.22%	0												
1974	2,860	5.69%	0							3,703	7.36%	0	20,655	41.07%	2	1,750	3.48%	0	11,393	22.66%	1												
1970	2,093	5.42%	0										18,625	48.23%	2	1,558	4.03%	0	14,384	37.25%	1												
1966													15,404	49.02%	2				14,520	46.21%	1												
1962										10,247	36.80%	1	13,240	47.55%	2				3,521	12.65%	1												
1958										3,737	24.68%	1	6,664	44.01%	1				2,890	19.08%	1												
1953													8,195	62.59%	2				827	6.32%	0												
1949												0			1						4												

=== Detailed ===
==== 2020s ====
===== 2022 =====
Results of the 2022 general election held on 6 February 2022:

Party		Votes per canton										Total votes	%	Seats
Party		Barva	Belén	Flores	Here- dia	San Isidro	San Pablo	San Rafael	Santa Bárbara	Santo Domingo	Sara- piquí	Total votes	%	Seats
National Liberation Party	PLN	5,380	3,447	3,436	15,451	3,041	3,718	5,422	5,658	6,656	7,814	60,023	25.89%	2
Social Democratic Progress Party	PPSD	3,564	1,850	2,002	9,408	1,631	2,257	3,445	2,781	3,646	1,787	32,371	13.96%	1
Progressive Liberal Party	PLP	2,784	2,187	1,833	9,437	1,545	2,485	3,156	2,138	3,703	390	29,658	12.79%	1
Social Christian Unity Party	PUSC	2,164	3,462	1,721	6,534	1,559	2,050	2,643	1,943	2,911	1,353	26,340	11.36%	1
Broad Front	FA	3,031	1,243	1,141	7,718	1,219	2,003	3,171	1,646	2,644	856	24,672	10.64%	1
New Republic Party	PNR	1,907	502	692	5,338	695	1,095	2,008	1,819	1,781	3,195	19,032	8.21%	0
Citizens' Action Party	PAC	578	293	319	1,788	280	392	603	337	585	282	5,457	2.35%	0
National Restoration Party	PRN	1,810	88	189	973	100	195	361	380	365	361	4,822	2.08%	0
United We Can	UP	267	67	96	1,155	463	220	384	156	356	463	3,627	1.56%	0
Accessibility without Exclusion	PASE	420	96	114	1,164	139	197	326	264	326	491	3,537	1.53%	0
National Encounter Party	PEN	443	20	59	1,199	127	334	407	168	180	170	3,107	1.34%	0
A Just Costa Rica	CRJ	249	87	253	1,045	129	148	260	222	271	217	2,881	1.24%	0
Liberal Union Party	UL	306	150	130	923	94	192	261	234	403	168	2,861	1.23%	0
New Generation Party	PNG	199	82	96	520	60	99	180	124	178	1,026	2,564	1.11%	0
Social Christian Republican Party	PRSC	227	61	312	458	75	79	147	351	135	124	1,969	0.85%	0
National Force Party	PFN	186	78	88	502	73	130	231	133	260	144	1,825	0.79%	0
Costa Rican Social Justice Party	JSC	142	37	52	391	118	143	226	110	137	131	1,487	0.64%	0
National Integration Party	PIN	81	78	38	343	33	52	95	81	96	199	1,096	0.47%	0
Libertarian Movement	PML	143	68	41	280	45	50	104	149	103	84	1,067	0.46%	0
Christian Democratic Alliance	ADC	92	26	34	242	37	60	93	58	111	75	828	0.36%	0
Our People Party	PNP	46	28	20	191	54	104	74	47	68	40	672	0.29%	0
Costa Rican Social; Democratic Movement	PMSDC	90	17	19	153	28	29	52	48	49	63	548	0.24%	0
Workers' Party	PT	54	25	23	150	39	35	55	50	63	41	535	0.23%	0
United People	PU	53	12	9	125	20	27	42	66	67	73	494	0.21%	0
Costa Rican Democratic Union	PUCD	102	19	14	65	11	29	27	21	28	32	348	0.15%	0
Valid votes		24,318	14,023	12,731	65,553	11,615	16,123	23,773	18,984	25,122	19,579	231,821	100.00%	6
Blank votes		136	76	57	304	72	85	131	125	120	258	1,364	0.58%	
Rejected votes – other		199	74	71	525	98	131	211	182	182	243	1,916	0.81%	
Total polled		24,653	14,173	12,859	66,382	11,785	16,339	24,115	19,291	25,424	20,080	235,101	66.09%	
Registered electors		35,151	19,738	18,075	101,774	17,246	23,488	38,295	28,615	36,195	37,161	355,738		
Turnout		70.13%	71.81%	71.14%	65.22%	68.33%	69.56%	62.97%	67.42%	70.24%	54.04%	66.09%		

The following candidates were elected: Ada Gabriela Acuña Castro (PPSD); Jonathan Acuña Soto (FA); Horacio Martín Alvarado Bogantes (PUSC); Gilberto Arnoldo Campos Cruz (PLP); Kattia Rivera Soto (PLN); and Pedro Rojas Guzmán (PLN).

==== 2010s ====
===== 2018 =====
Results of the 2018 general election held on 4 February 2018:

Party		Votes per canton										Total votes	%	Seats
Party		Barva	Belén	Flores	Here- dia	San Isidro	San Pablo	San Rafael	Santa Bárbara	Santo Domingo	Sara- piquí	Total votes	%	Seats
Citizens' Action Party	PAC	5,809	2,467	2,545	15,564	2,613	3,339	5,768	3,714	5,267	2,171	49,257	20.95%	2
National Liberation Party	PLN	4,142	2,754	2,860	12,988	2,405	2,616	4,238	3,795	5,593	3,381	44,772	19.05%	2
Social Christian Unity Party	PUSC	3,505	4,873	2,590	10,968	2,224	4,178	4,096	2,694	4,726	2,209	42,063	17.89%	1
National Restoration Party	PRN	4,310	1,234	1,515	11,865	1,390	2,419	4,514	3,982	3,736	6,808	41,773	17.77%	1
National Integration Party	PIN	1,822	756	915	4,604	961	942	1,853	1,498	1,733	1,519	16,603	7.06%	0
Broad Front	FA	1,410	630	524	3,812	502	819	1,412	676	1,115	518	11,418	4.86%	0
Social Christian Republican Party	PRSC	1,209	276	632	2,179	289	411	822	999	624	681	8,122	3.45%	0
New Generation Party	PNG	565	194	224	1,481	246	416	545	315	588	548	5,122	2.18%	0
Libertarian Movement	PML	471	290	231	1,400	262	293	454	336	478	444	4,659	1.98%	0
Accessibility without Exclusion	PASE	355	122	157	1,070	133	194	399	297	327	293	3,347	1.42%	0
Costa Rican Renewal Party	PRC	241	103	122	795	219	185	260	174	665	263	3,027	1.29%	0
Christian Democratic Alliance	ADC	289	81	107	916	117	136	311	229	303	333	2,822	1.20%	0
Progressive Liberal Party	PLP	89	115	70	313	45	97	111	46	119	45	1,050	0.45%	0
Workers' Party	PT	118	47	52	327	53	76	107	75	103	91	1,049	0.45%	0
Valid votes		24,335	13,942	12,544	68,282	11,459	16,121	24,890	18,830	25,377	19,304	235,084	100.00%	6
Blank votes		62	38	32	174	70	48	124	71	81	200	900	0.38%	
Rejected votes – other		214	95	73	635	134	143	272	202	231	373	2,372	1.00%	
Total polled		24,611	14,075	12,649	69,091	11,663	16,312	25,286	19,103	25,689	19,877	238,356	71.61%	
Registered electors		32,786	18,745	16,683	96,661	16,081	21,950	35,395	26,746	34,421	33,391	332,859		
Turnout		75.07%	75.09%	75.82%	71.48%	72.53%	74.31%	71.44%	71.42%	74.63%	59.53%	71.61%		

The following candidates were elected: Ana Lucía Delgado Orozco (PLN); Jorge Luis Fonseca Fonseca (PLN); Catalina Montero Gómez (PAC); Jonathan Prendas (PRN); Welmer Ramos González (PAC); and Aracelly Salas Eduarte (PUSC).

===== 2014 =====
Results of the 2014 general election held on 2 February 2014:

Party		Votes per canton										Total votes	%	Seats
Party		Barva	Belén	Flores	Here- dia	San Isidro	San Pablo	San Rafael	Santa Bárbara	Santo Domingo	Sara- piquí	Total votes	%	Seats
Citizens' Action Party	PAC	7,813	3,520	4,158	22,030	3,705	4,482	7,569	5,288	8,444	2,351	69,360	31.49%	2
National Liberation Party	PLN	4,588	3,152	2,732	14,773	2,509	2,723	4,717	4,222	5,534	7,609	52,559	23.86%	2
Broad Front	FA	3,437	1,336	1,153	8,558	1,282	1,684	3,364	2,235	2,532	2,472	28,053	12.74%	1
Social Christian Unity Party	PUSC	1,476	2,902	1,176	4,440	821	3,385	1,618	1,316	1,972	1,043	20,149	9.15%	1
Libertarian Movement	PML	1,491	1,116	804	5,207	797	772	1,630	1,576	1,818	1,471	16,682	7.57%	0
National Restoration Party	PRN	1,117	261	453	3,194	423	613	1,047	949	1,109	1,097	10,263	4.66%	0
Accessibility without Exclusion	PASE	973	271	380	2,306	473	353	1,019	866	1,296	688	8,625	3.92%	0
Costa Rican Renewal Party	PRC	536	146	184	1,603	213	296	470	388	579	776	5,191	2.36%	0
New Homeland Party	PPN	360	139	177	1,222	173	247	508	271	374	157	3,628	1.65%	0
New Generation Party	PNG	202	122	143	760	95	173	228	131	270	65	2,189	0.99%	0
Workers' Party	PT	106	51	54	505	71	54	145	85	118	173	1,362	0.62%	0
National Advance	PAN	179	32	36	342	29	81	274	98	135	70	1,276	0.58%	0
National Integration Party	PIN	69	33	23	198	21	30	75	54	78	60	641	0.29%	0
New Socialist Party	NPS	28	16	7	87	10	19	34	30	21	25	277	0.13%	0
Valid votes		22,375	13,097	11,480	65,225	10,622	14,912	22,698	17,509	24,280	18,057	220,255	100.00%	6
Blank votes		82	55	48	224	66	40	94	104	91	164	968	0.43%	
Rejected votes – other		284	128	111	713	135	160	283	257	268	357	2,696	1.20%	
Total polled		22,741	13,280	11,639	66,162	10,823	15,112	23,075	17,870	24,639	18,578	223,919	72.96%	
Registered electors		30,088	17,266	15,087	90,600	14,503	20,119	32,186	24,726	32,559	29,767	306,901		
Turnout		75.58%	76.91%	77.15%	73.03%	74.63%	75.11%	71.69%	72.27%	75.67%	62.41%	72.96%		

The following candidates were elected: William Alvarado Bogantes (PUSC); Marlene Madrigal Flores (PAC); Ronny Monge Salas (PLN); Henry Mora Jiménez (PAC); José Antonio Ramírez Aguilar (FA); and Lorelly Trejos Salas (PLN).

===== 2010 =====
Results of the 2010 general election held on 7 February 2010:

Party		Votes per canton										Total votes	%	Seats
Party		Barva	Belén	Flores	Here- dia	San Isidro	San Pablo	San Rafael	Santa Bárbara	Santo Domingo	Sara- piquí	Total votes	%	Seats
National Liberation Party	PLN	6,631	5,117	4,172	22,862	4,120	4,400	7,019	5,749	8,575	5,284	73,929	37.02%	2
Citizens' Action Party	PAC	4,607	2,020	1,955	11,060	2,193	2,490	4,058	3,008	4,555	2,197	38,143	19.10%	2
Libertarian Movement	PML	3,004	1,537	1,339	7,944	918	1,287	3,098	2,775	2,829	3,035	27,766	13.90%	1
Accessibility without Exclusion	PASE	1,706	933	758	5,238	774	931	1,783	1,547	2,820	925	17,415	8.72%	0
Social Christian Unity Party	PUSC	1,089	1,239	645	3,832	571	2,607	1,161	822	1,330	1,214	14,510	7.27%	0
Broad Front	FA	1,262	319	334	3,680	272	608	1,078	665	906	399	9,523	4.77%	0
National Restoration Party of Heredia	PRN	937	240	309	2,665	193	441	1,338	799	600	431	7,953	3.98%	0
Costa Rican Renewal Party	PRC	453	129	148	1,601	150	272	364	354	551	1,702	5,724	2.87%	0
Patriotic Alliance	AP	266	214	358	1,302	99	150	391	220	231	554	3,785	1.90%	0
National Integration Party	PIN	85	42	35	276	50	70	101	101	121	69	950	0.48%	0
Valid votes		20,040	11,790	10,053	60,460	9,340	13,256	20,391	16,040	22,518	15,810	199,698	100.00%	5
Blank votes		128	88	91	322	92	69	177	163	123	280	1,533	0.75%	
Rejected votes – other		207	134	128	590	112	143	283	216	231	422	2,466	1.21%	
Total polled		20,375	12,012	10,272	61,372	9,544	13,468	20,851	16,419	22,872	16,512	203,697	73.13%	
Registered electors		26,982	15,687	13,404	84,511	12,800	17,791	29,077	22,277	30,208	25,807	278,544		
Turnout		75.51%	76.57%	76.63%	72.62%	74.56%	75.70%	71.71%	73.70%	75.72%	63.98%	73.13%		

The following candidates were elected: Yolanda Acuña Castro (PAC); María de los Ángeles Alfaro Murillo (PML); Claudio Enrique Monge Pereira (PAC); Elvia Dicciana Villalobos Argüello (PLN); and Víctor Hugo Víquez Chaverri (PLN).

==== 2000s ====
===== 2006 =====
Results of the 2006 general election held on 5 February 2006:

Party		Votes per canton										Total votes	%	Seats
Party		Barva	Belén	Flores	Here- dia	San Isidro	San Pablo	San Rafael	Santa Bárbara	Santo Domingo	Sara- piquí	Total votes	%	Seats
National Liberation Party	PLN	5,516	3,941	3,251	19,577	3,111	3,710	5,933	5,281	6,421	4,169	60,910	36.36%	3
Citizens' Action Party	PAC	5,446	3,048	2,397	16,230	2,345	3,175	5,840	3,838	6,362	2,643	51,324	30.64%	2
Libertarian Movement	PML	1,801	883	692	4,864	523	829	1,611	1,289	1,541	1,046	15,079	9.00%	0
Social Christian Unity Party	PUSC	1,152	771	823	3,527	558	1,793	1,231	602	2,168	1,234	13,859	8.27%	0
Costa Rican Renewal Party	PRC	584	157	181	1,757	296	332	590	479	706	2,016	7,098	4.24%	0
Union for Change Party	PUPC	351	261	219	1,088	137	238	385	244	523	196	3,642	2.17%	0
Authentic Heredian Party	PAH	465	115	236	1,071	190	143	220	651	245	220	3,556	2.12%	0
National Union Party	PUN	285	140	121	1,030	73	233	393	175	531	124	3,105	1.85%	0
Homeland First Party	PPP	260	133	127	922	101	117	272	284	249	215	2,680	1.60%	0
Democratic Nationalist Alliance	ADN	260	329	55	897	48	105	200	82	81	34	2,091	1.25%	0
National Integration Party	PIN	87	192	52	495	38	61	129	88	106	60	1,308	0.78%	0
Democratic Force	FD	127	53	48	389	35	90	112	92	120	75	1,141	0.68%	0
Patriotic Union	UP	85	22	51	376	34	53	160	60	85	105	1,031	0.62%	0
United Left	IU	92	17	21	208	19	39	143	52	63	30	684	0.41%	0
Valid votes		16,511	10,062	8,274	52,431	7,508	10,918	17,219	13,217	19,201	12,167	167,508	100.00%	5
Blank votes		88	83	55	412	70	64	140	102	94	166	1,274	0.74%	
Rejected votes – other		259	169	112	727	142	160	358	297	282	382	2,888	1.68%	
Total polled		16,858	10,314	8,441	53,570	7,720	11,142	17,717	13,616	19,577	12,715	171,670	69.79%	
Registered electors		23,339	14,022	11,507	76,637	11,123	15,173	25,863	19,360	26,992	21,977	245,993		
Turnout		72.23%	73.56%	73.36%	69.90%	69.41%	73.43%	68.50%	70.33%	72.53%	57.86%	69.79%		

The following candidates were elected: Hilda González Ramírez (PLN); Francisco Molina Gamboa (PAC); José Ángel Ocampo Bolaños (PLN); Fernando Sánchez Campos (PLN); and Lesvia Villalobos Salas (PAC).

===== 2002 =====
Results of the 2002 general election held on 3 February 2002:

Party		Votes per canton										Total votes	%	Seats
Party		Barva	Belén	Flores	Here- dia	San Isidro	San Pablo	San Rafael	Santa Bárbara	Santo Domingo	Sara- piquí	Total votes	%	Seats
Citizens' Action Party	PAC	4,077	2,240	2,193	14,940	1,785	2,776	4,245	2,954	4,706	1,690	41,606	27.65%	2
Social Christian Unity Party	PUSC	3,737	3,084	2,058	12,599	1,777	3,101	4,130	3,066	4,915	2,995	41,462	27.55%	1
National Liberation Party	PLN	4,043	2,376	1,851	10,807	1,995	2,019	3,421	3,486	3,792	2,733	36,523	24.27%	1
Libertarian Movement	PML	1,513	870	698	5,951	560	935	1,779	1,153	1,540	1,123	16,122	10.71%	1
Costa Rican Renewal Party	PRC	365	118	196	1,393	227	249	500	435	675	1,132	5,290	3.52%	0
Democratic Force	FD	329	192	129	922	110	122	764	197	306	444	3,515	2.34%	0
Coalition Change 2000	CC2000	123	29	27	306	136	58	111	137	1,023	76	2,026	1.35%	0
National Integration Party	PIN	155	167	52	530	38	81	123	105	173	67	1,491	0.99%	0
National Rescue Party	PRN	113	29	47	310	18	50	95	38	73	78	851	0.57%	0
National Patriotic Party	PPN	55	26	14	198	23	47	78	37	56	87	621	0.41%	0
National Christian Alliance	ANC	43	18	19	170	20	28	50	79	42	58	527	0.35%	0
General Union Party	PUGEN	30	12	8	67	10	12	29	11	32	28	239	0.16%	0
Independent Workers' Party	PIO	17	12	4	47	9	24	14	15	34	28	204	0.14%	0
Valid votes		14,600	9,173	7,296	48,240	6,708	9,502	15,339	11,713	17,367	10,539	150,477	100.00%	5
Blank votes		126	85	73	328	91	66	186	175	133	323	1,586	1.03%	
Rejected votes – other		159	93	83	569	102	124	270	202	220	334	2,156	1.40%	
Total polled		14,885	9,351	7,452	49,137	6,901	9,692	15,795	12,090	17,720	11,196	154,219	71.70%	
Registered electors		19,929	12,263	9,940	68,379	9,641	12,970	22,476	16,641	23,975	18,882	215,096		
Turnout		74.69%	76.25%	74.97%	71.86%	71.58%	74.73%	70.27%	72.65%	73.91%	59.29%	71.70%		

The following candidates were elected: Quírico Jiménez Madrigal (PAC); Emilia María Rodríguez Arias (PAC); José Francisco Salas Ramos (PML); Federico Guillermo Vargas Ulloa (PUSC); and María de los Ángeles Víquez Sáenz (PLN).

==== 1990s ====
===== 1998 =====
Results of the 1998 general election held on 1 February 1998:

Party		Votes per canton										Total votes	%	Seats
Party		Barva	Belén	Flores	Here- dia	San Isidro	San Pablo	San Rafael	Santa Bárbara	Santo Domingo	Sara- piquí	Total votes	%	Seats
Social Christian Unity Party	PUSC	4,624	3,968	2,451	15,294	2,164	3,112	4,861	3,692	6,610	4,260	51,036	39.20%	3
National Liberation Party	PLN	4,370	2,891	2,609	14,666	2,382	2,832	4,437	3,981	4,933	3,575	46,676	35.85%	2
Democratic Force	FD	1,001	374	293	2,976	366	572	1,343	760	1,078	511	9,274	7.12%	0
National Integration Party	PIN	421	194	190	1,770	126	280	447	219	420	121	4,188	3.22%	0
National Rescue Party	PRN	558	70	120	2,212	30	275	299	124	113	166	3,967	3.05%	0
Costa Rican Renewal Party	PRC	295	45	53	995	172	246	281	314	517	312	3,230	2.48%	0
Libertarian Movement	PML	325	191	138	1,131	71	177	570	193	314	81	3,191	2.45%	0
General Union Party	PUGEN	113	35	276	280	186	65	137	94	1,132	40	2,358	1.81%	0
Democratic Party	PD	238	91	98	563	138	207	295	316	217	125	2,288	1.76%	0
United People	PU	270	51	35	370	34	59	286	182	86	86	1,459	1.12%	0
National Independent Party	PNI	105	31	27	390	22	58	116	53	60	31	893	0.69%	0
New Democratic Party	NPD	56	90	20	233	10	34	64	18	84	51	660	0.51%	0
National Christian Alliance	ANC	51	11	12	219	13	45	70	34	51	52	558	0.43%	0
Independent Party	PI	24	28	8	109	7	63	29	34	35	80	417	0.32%	0
Valid votes		12,451	8,070	6,330	41,208	5,721	8,025	13,235	10,014	15,650	9,491	130,195	100.00%	5
Blank votes		106	66	71	233	31	52	125	108	86	163	1,041	0.78%	
Rejected votes – other		225	111	136	665	132	109	369	167	267	323	2,504	1.87%	
Total polled		12,782	8,247	6,537	42,106	5,884	8,186	13,729	10,289	16,003	9,977	133,740	71.92%	
Registered electors		17,090	10,874	8,724	58,751	8,200	11,136	19,453	14,425	21,452	15,860	185,965		
Turnout		74.79%	75.84%	74.93%	71.67%	71.76%	73.51%	70.58%	71.33%	74.60%	62.91%	71.92%		

The following candidates were elected: Horacio Martín Alvarado Bogantes (PUSC); Manuel Antonio Bolaños Salas (PUSC); María lsabel Chamorro Santamaría (PLN); Sergio Salazar Rivera (PUSC); and Róger Vílchez Cascante (PLN).

===== 1994 =====
Results of the 1994 general election held on 6 February 1994:

Party		Votes per canton										Total votes	%	Seats
Party		Barva	Belén	Flores	Here- dia	San Isidro	San Pablo	San Rafael	Santa Bárbara	Santo Domingo	Sara- piquí	Total votes	%	Seats
National Liberation Party	PLN	5,529	3,818	3,311	18,633	3,099	3,635	6,182	5,586	6,874	4,795	61,462	45.93%	3
Social Christian Unity Party	PUSC	5,009	3,598	2,980	16,439	2,361	3,530	6,001	4,128	7,087	3,631	54,764	40.93%	2
Democratic Force	FD	1,411	566	487	3,902	259	652	1,268	690	962	323	10,520	7.86%	0
General Union Party	PUGEN	173	50	56	632	101	102	150	104	884	65	2,317	1.73%	0
People's Vanguard Party	PVP	171	68	50	582	46	82	289	185	111	128	1,712	1.28%	0
National Christian Alliance	ANC	108	55	43	495	62	83	223	131	202	173	1,575	1.18%	0
Independent Party	PI	72	39	35	303	13	103	70	39	63	34	771	0.58%	0
National Independent Party	PNI	57	28	31	293	15	54	79	42	43	47	689	0.51%	0
Valid votes		12,530	8,222	6,993	41,279	5,956	8,241	14,262	10,905	16,226	9,196	133,810	100.00%	5
Blank votes		131	76	75	288	56	64	184	177	116	179	1,346	0.98%	
Rejected votes – other		193	125	68	487	87	116	287	157	242	292	2,054	1.50%	
Total polled		12,854	8,423	7,136	42,054	6,099	8,421	14,733	11,239	16,584	9,667	137,210	84.06%	
Registered electors		14,907	9,768	8,141	49,971	7,290	9,809	17,558	13,132	19,627	13,016	163,219		
Turnout		86.23%	86.23%	87.66%	84.16%	83.66%	85.85%	83.91%	85.58%	84.50%	74.27%	84.06%		

The following candidates were elected: Álvaro Azofeifa Astúa (PLN); Bernardo Benavides Benavides (PUSC); Víctor Julio Brenes Rojas (PLN); Orlando González Villalobos (PUSC); and Luis Antonio Martínez Ramírez (PLN).

===== 1990 =====
Results of the 1990 general election held on 4 February 1990:

Party		Votes per canton										Total votes	%	Seats
Party		Barva	Belén	Flores	Here- dia	San Isidro	San Pablo	San Rafael	Santa Bárbara	Santo Domingo	Sara- piquí	Total votes	%	Seats
Social Christian Unity Party	PUSC	5,162	3,345	2,800	15,659	2,608	3,305	6,444	4,538	7,557	3,326	54,744	46.87%	3
National Liberation Party	PLN	4,545	3,625	2,619	15,159	2,360	3,031	4,888	4,505	6,051	3,336	50,119	42.91%	2
United People	PU	604	140	567	1,697	99	305	558	372	328	451	5,121	4.38%	0
General Union Party	PUGEN	201	44	63	791	41	169	280	226	272	61	2,148	1.84%	0
National Christian Alliance	ANC	164	60	49	600	45	191	264	122	248	306	2,049	1.75%	0
Party of Progress	PdP	128	31	30	791	27	56	82	26	165	22	1,358	1.16%	0
National Independent Party	PNI	78	50	86	315	28	41	149	44	77	66	934	0.80%	0
Independent Party	PI	17	102	7	62	5	46	25	17	26	13	320	0.27%	0
Valid votes		10,899	7,397	6,221	35,074	5,213	7,144	12,690	9,850	14,724	7,581	116,793	100.00%	5
Blank votes		124	73	64	228	62	73	152	172	101	178	1,227	1.02%	
Rejected votes – other		165	157	102	453	113	152	341	184	239	289	2,195	1.83%	
Total polled		11,188	7,627	6,387	35,755	5,388	7,369	13,183	10,206	15,064	8,048	120,215	85.13%	
Registered electors		12,810	8,659	7,268	41,624	6,387	8,513	15,651	11,704	17,712	10,882	141,210		
Turnout		87.34%	88.08%	87.88%	85.90%	84.36%	86.56%	84.23%	87.20%	85.05%	73.96%	85.13%		

The following candidates were elected: Manuel Antonio Bolaños Salas (PUSC); Danilo Chaverri Soto (PUSC); José Joaquín Chaves Zamora (PLN); William Cordero Gamboa (PUSC); and Carlos Sequeira Lépiz (PLN).

==== 1980s ====
===== 1986 =====
Results of the 1986 general election held on 2 February 1986:

Party		Votes per canton										Total votes	%	Seats
Party		Barva	Belén	Flores	Here- dia	San Isidro	San Pablo	San Rafael	Santa Bárbara	Santo Domingo	Sara- piquí	Total votes	%	Seats
National Liberation Party	PLN	4,246	3,033	2,812	15,064	2,171	2,871	5,312	4,273	6,113	2,820	48,715	48.32%	3
Social Christian Unity Party	PUSC	4,130	2,880	2,331	12,305	2,089	2,429	4,631	3,337	6,183	2,142	42,457	42.11%	2
United People	PU	403	196	124	1,396	100	210	557	129	335	666	4,116	4.08%	0
People's Alliance Coalition	CAP	226	65	105	811	54	162	289	538	176	132	2,558	2.54%	0
National Christian Alliance	ANC	163	123	46	728	30	124	266	120	189	295	2,084	2.07%	0
National Republican Party	PNR	84	43	25	225	28	98	75	48	80	56	762	0.76%	0
General Union Party	PUGEN	5	5	3	59	7	8	8	5	16	6	122	0.12%	0
Valid votes		9,257	6,345	5,446	30,588	4,479	5,902	11,138	8,450	13,092	6,117	100,814	100.00%	5
Blank votes		83	76	40	176	64	54	157	133	113	127	1,023	0.99%	
Rejected votes – other		170	93	70	393	77	106	229	208	185	283	1,814	1.75%	
Total polled		9,510	6,514	5,556	31,157	4,620	6,062	11,524	8,791	13,390	6,527	103,651	84.87%	
Registered electors		10,952	7,380	6,355	35,984	5,525	7,065	13,739	10,159	15,821	9,143	122,123		
Turnout		86.83%	88.27%	87.43%	86.59%	83.62%	85.80%	83.88%	86.53%	84.63%	71.39%	84.87%		

The following candidates were elected: Rodrigo Araya Umaña (PUSC); Edgar Allan Benavides Vílchez (PLN); Hilda González Ramírez (PLN); Rodrigo Arias Sánchez (PLN); and Olga Zamora Fonseca (PUSC).

===== 1982 =====
Results of the 1982 general election held on 7 February 1982:

Party		Votes per canton										Total votes	%	Seats
Party		Barva	Belén	Flores	Here- dia	San Isidro	San Pablo	San Rafael	Santa Bárbara	Santo Domingo	Sara- piquí	Total votes	%	Seats
National Liberation Party	PLN	3,887	2,786	2,534	12,885	2,026	2,559	4,734	3,732	5,446	2,675	43,264	54.03%	2
Unity Coalition	CU	2,558	2,034	1,492	8,040	1,290	1,493	2,785	1,817	3,621	844	25,974	32.44%	2
United People	PU	679	236	231	2,410	106	318	901	519	575	704	6,679	8.34%	0
National Movement	MN	154	117	216	1,159	52	88	183	181	620	70	2,840	3.55%	0
National Democratic Party	PND	65	50	26	429	6	37	89	36	97	10	845	1.06%	0
Independent Party	PI	21	9	7	57	9	32	129	10	20	36	330	0.41%	0
Democratic Party	PD	4	13	3	33	6	5	20	13	23	18	138	0.17%	0
Valid votes		7,368	5,245	4,509	25,013	3,495	4,532	8,841	6,308	10,402	4,357	80,070	100.00%	4
Blank votes		83	60	40	163	43	30	102	90	96	99	806	0.98%	
Rejected votes – other		114	85	41	307	64	70	234	127	145	168	1,355	1.65%	
Total polled		7,565	5,390	4,590	25,483	3,602	4,632	9,177	6,525	10,643	4,624	82,231	81.10%	
Registered electors		9,019	6,305	5,408	30,613	4,570	5,658	11,510	7,957	13,327	7,032	101,399		
Turnout		83.88%	85.49%	84.87%	83.24%	78.82%	81.87%	79.73%	82.00%	79.86%	65.76%	81.10%		

The following candidates were elected: Danilo Chaverri Soto (CU); Gerardo Vega Hernández (PLN); Jorge Eduardo Villalobos Barquero (CU); and Edgar Víquez Víquez (PLN).

==== 1970s ====
===== 1978 =====
Results of the 1978 general election held on 5 February 1978:

Party		Votes per canton										Total votes	%	Seats
Party		Barva	Belén	Flores	Here- dia	San Isidro	San Pablo	San Rafael	Santa Bárbara	Santo Domingo	Sara- piquí	Total votes	%	Seats
Unity Coalition	CU	2,885	2,080	1,596	9,021	1,282	1,653	3,258	2,161	4,384	1,452	29,772	44.66%	2
National Liberation Party	PLN	2,319	2,018	1,863	8,196	1,297	1,386	2,825	2,465	3,292	1,341	27,002	40.50%	2
United People	PU	638	241	221	2,291	81	301	737	461	611	757	6,339	9.51%	0
National Unification Party	PUN	71	55	17	703	40	74	102	79	293	44	1,478	2.22%	0
Costa Rican Concord Party	PCC	30	16	8	237	17	21	56	95	19	14	513	0.77%	0
Independent Party	PI	31	18	30	135	13	22	170	18	40	20	497	0.75%	0
National Independent Party	PNI	14	20	8	67	17	46	30	20	202	27	451	0.68%	0
Republican Union Party	PUR	24	12	12	125	9	12	45	21	60	21	341	0.51%	0
Democratic Party	PD	18	5	7	43	10	10	19	10	16	11	149	0.22%	0
National Labour Party	PLN	12	8	3	40	3	14	13	13	12	9	127	0.19%	0
Valid votes		6,042	4,473	3,765	20,858	2,769	3,539	7,255	5,343	8,929	3,696	66,669	100.00%	4
Blank votes		81	76	39	190	59	46	171	107	127	97	993	1.44%	
Rejected votes – other		115	90	40	340	62	90	226	134	161	167	1,425	2.06%	
Total polled		6,238	4,639	3,844	21,388	2,890	3,675	7,652	5,584	9,217	3,960	69,087	84.23%	
Registered electors		7,135	5,322	4,392	24,869	3,529	4,329	9,210	6,611	11,055	5,568	82,020		
Turnout		87.43%	87.17%	87.52%	86.00%	81.89%	84.89%	83.08%	84.47%	83.37%	71.12%	84.23%		

The following candidates were elected: Óscar Arias (PLN); Hernán Azofeifa Víquez (PLN); Yolanda Calderón Sandí (CU); and Carlos Manuel Pereira Garro (CU).

===== 1974 =====
Results of the 1974 general election held on 3 February 1974:

Party		Votes per canton										Total votes	%	Seats
Party		Barva	Belén	Flores	Here- dia	San Isidro	San Pablo	San Rafael	Santa Bárbara	Santo Domingo	Sara- piquí	Total votes	%	Seats
National Liberation Party	PLN	1,878	1,510	1,181	6,415	1,077	1,054	2,340	1,605	2,721	874	20,655	41.07%	2
National Unification Party	PUN	936	698	707	3,007	541	584	1,145	1,033	2,259	483	11,393	22.66%	1
National Independent Party	PNI	519	435	254	1,265	185	138	644	343	655	509	4,947	9.84%	0
Democratic Renewal Party	PRD	481	295	206	1,549	65	148	322	128	503	47	3,744	7.45%	0
National Republican Party	PRN	273	193	125	1,849	147	226	253	277	257	103	3,703	7.36%	0
Socialist Action Party	PASO	364	39	92	1,079	42	68	320	273	172	411	2,860	5.69%	0
Christian Democratic Party	PDC	124	77	99	692	44	36	170	199	224	85	1,750	3.48%	0
Democratic Party	PD	76	22	33	315	13	39	118	34	107	22	779	1.55%	0
Costa Rican Socialist Party	PSC	17	59	10	148	3	5	25	22	35	5	329	0.65%	0
Independent Party	PI	17	8	7	34	7	4	25	5	14	7	128	0.25%	0
Valid votes		4,685	3,336	2,714	16,353	2,124	2,302	5,362	3,919	6,947	2,546	50,288	100.00%	3
Blank votes		106	79	65	191	54	29	149	98	133	68	972	1.85%	
Rejected votes – other		110	85	51	347	62	83	148	123	150	131	1,290	2.45%	
Total polled		4,901	3,500	2,830	16,891	2,240	2,414	5,659	4,140	7,230	2,745	52,550	81.57%	
Registered electors		5,843	4,160	3,414	19,972	2,945	2,939	6,959	5,189	8,743	4,257	64,421		
Turnout		83.88%	84.13%	82.89%	84.57%	76.06%	82.14%	81.32%	79.78%	82.69%	64.48%	81.57%		

The following candidates were elected: Jorge Luis Arce Sáenz (PUN); Manuel Antonio González Flores (PLN); and Edwin León Villalobos (PLN).

===== 1970 =====
Results of the 1970 general election held on 1 February 1970:

Party		Votes per canton									Total votes	%	Seats
Party		Barva	Belén	Flores	Here- dia	San Isidro	San Pablo	San Rafael	Santa Bárbara	Santo Domingo	Total votes	%	Seats
National Liberation Party	PLN	1,830	1,371	1,053	6,382	1,077	755	2,053	1,581	2,523	18,625	48.23%	2
National Unification Party	PUN	1,563	989	917	5,117	480	588	1,286	1,124	2,320	14,384	37.25%	1
Socialist Action Party	PASO	233	22	76	1,050	20	80	187	239	186	2,093	5.42%	0
National Front Party	PFN	80	145	161	752	110	70	149	95	103	1,665	4.31%	0
Christian Democratic Party	PDC	94	77	50	886	49	32	105	37	228	1,558	4.03%	0
National Union Party	PUN	13	25	5	61	1	3	7	16	20	151	0.39%	0
Costa Rican Renewal Movement	MRC	29	6	8	55	2	4	14	9	13	140	0.36%	0
Valid votes		3,842	2,635	2,270	14,303	1,739	1,532	3,801	3,101	5,393	38,616	100.00%	3
Blank votes		91	55	62	235	63	38	124	98	108	874	2.15%	
Rejected votes – other		110	87	72	379	75	61	123	113	129	1,149	2.83%	
Total polled		4,043	2,777	2,404	14,917	1,877	1,631	4,048	3,312	5,630	40,639	86.64%	
Registered electors		4,552	3,091	2,730	17,176	2,258	1,942	4,665	3,909	6,584	46,907		
Turnout		88.82%	89.84%	88.06%	86.85%	83.13%	83.99%	86.77%	84.73%	85.51%	86.64%		

The following candidates were elected: Óscar Campos Orozco (PLN); Óscar Román Hernández Pacheco (PLN); and Rodrigo Hernández Vargas (PUN).

==== 1960s ====
===== 1966 =====
Results of the 1966 general election held on 6 February 1966:

Party		Votes per canton									Total votes	%	Seats
Party		Barva	Belén	Flores	Here- dia	San Isidro	San Pablo	San Rafael	Santa Bárbara	Santo Domingo	Total votes	%	Seats
National Liberation Party	PLN	1,377	1,085	1,096	5,422	913	585	1,307	1,449	2,170	15,404	49.02%	2
National Unification Party	PUN	1,553	971	861	5,187	617	582	1,300	1,111	2,338	14,520	46.21%	1
Revolutionary Civic Union	UCR	78	70	63	284	21	29	124	47	157	873	2.78%	0
Democratic Party	PD	32	17	15	364	14	19	58	69	39	627	2.00%	0
Valid votes		3,040	2,143	2,035	11,257	1,565	1,215	2,789	2,676	4,704	31,424	100.00%	3
Blank votes		72	56	36	154	31	20	98	73	108	648	1.92%	
Rejected votes – other		174	106	75	628	85	104	183	105	180	1,640	4.86%	
Total polled		3,286	2,305	2,146	12,039	1,681	1,339	3,070	2,854	4,992	33,712	85.76%	
Registered electors		3,762	2,577	2,404	14,057	2,023	1,599	3,628	3,404	5,856	39,310		
Turnout		87.35%	89.45%	89.27%	85.64%	83.09%	83.74%	84.62%	83.84%	85.25%	85.76%		

The following candidates were elected: Enrique Azofeifa Víquez (PLN); Fernando Gutiérrez Benavides (PLN); and Alfredo Vargas Fernández (PUN).

===== 1962 =====
Results of the 1962 general election held on 4 February 1962:

Party		Votes per canton									Total votes	%	Seats
Party		Barva	Belén	Flores	Here- dia	San Isidro	San Pablo	San Rafael	Santa Bárbara	Santo Domingo	Total votes	%	Seats
National Liberation Party	PLN	1,229	973	817	4,680	893	449	1,233	1,183	1,783	13,240	47.55%	2
Republican Party	PR	1,006	776	579	3,735	418	486	981	755	1,511	10,247	36.80%	1
National Union Party	PUN	332	192	308	1,332	103	114	245	283	612	3,521	12.65%	1
Popular Democratic Action	PADP	90	7	15	465	8	10	38	165	37	835	3.00%	0
Valid votes		2,657	1,948	1,719	10,212	1,422	1,059	2,497	2,386	3,943	27,843	100.00%	4
Blank votes		97	64	55	204	63	40	108	74	69	774	2.67%	
Rejected votes – other		36	36	11	112	15	27	25	34	36	332	1.15%	
Total polled		2,790	2,048	1,785	10,528	1,500	1,126	2,630	2,494	4,048	28,949	85.68%	
Registered electors		3,237	2,300	2,051	12,207	1,869	1,347	3,126	2,956	4,696	33,789		
Turnout		86.19%	89.04%	87.03%	86.25%	80.26%	83.59%	84.13%	84.37%	86.20%	85.68%		

The following candidates were elected: Dubilio Argüello Villalobos (PLN); Rafael Benavides Robles (PLN); Víctor Emilio Herrera Alfaro (PR); and Eduardo Víquez Ramírez (PUN).

==== 1950s ====
===== 1958 =====
Results of the 1958 general election held on 2 February 1958:

Party		Votes per canton								Total votes	%	Seats
Party		Barva	Belén	Flores	Here- dia	San Isidro	San Rafael	Santa Bárbara	Santo Domingo	Total votes	%	Seats
National Liberation Party	PLN	524	583	426	2,318	480	659	696	978	6,664	44.01%	1
National Republican Party	PRN	361	440	228	1,513	73	294	292	536	3,737	24.68%	1
National Union Party	PUN	326	110	285	1,142	165	199	217	446	2,890	19.08%	1
Independent Party	PI	191	59	104	681	33	105	70	193	1,436	9.48%	0
Revolutionary Civic Union	UCR	24	19	14	97	18	13	24	19	228	1.51%	0
Democratic Opposition Movement	MDO	22	7	6	67	5	6	6	12	131	0.87%	0
Democratic Party	PD	8	4	6	23	1	5	5	5	57	0.38%	0
Valid votes		1,456	1,222	1,069	5,841	775	1,281	1,310	2,189	15,143	100.00%	3
Blank votes		82	59	41	119	23	81	73	60	538	3.22%	
Rejected votes – other		131	78	64	378	67	87	101	120	1,026	6.14%	
Total polled		1,669	1,359	1,174	6,338	865	1,449	1,484	2,369	16,707	70.07%	
Registered electors		2,274	1,749	1,585	9,148	1,399	2,260	2,193	3,234	23,842		
Turnout		73.39%	77.70%	74.07%	69.28%	61.83%	64.12%	67.67%	73.25%	70.07%		

The following candidates were elected: Hernán Arguedas Katchenguis (PRN); Manuel Dobles Sánchez (PUN); and Eduardo Trejos Dittel (PLN).

===== 1953 =====
Results of the 1953 general election held on 26 July 1953:

Party		Votes per canton								Total votes	%	Seats
Party		Barva	Belén	Flores	Here- dia	San Isidro	San Rafael	Santa Bárbara	Santo Domingo	Total votes	%	Seats
National Liberation Party	PLN	746	769	543	3,083	418	709	790	1,137	8,195	62.59%	2
Democratic Party	PD	441	460	244	1,501	169	302	329	626	4,072	31.10%	1
National Union Party	PUN	59	33	92	359	22	97	75	90	827	6.32%	0
Valid votes		1,246	1,262	879	4,943	609	1,108	1,194	1,853	13,094	100.00%	3
Blank votes		104	61	61	242	58	119	72	94	811	5.51%	
Rejected votes – other		94	51	51	322	48	81	64	98	809	5.50%	
Total polled		1,444	1,374	991	5,507	715	1,308	1,330	2,045	14,714	74.85%	
Registered electors		1,888	1,677	1,317	7,427	1,027	1,867	1,746	2,708	19,657		
Turnout		76.48%	81.93%	75.25%	74.15%	69.62%	70.06%	76.17%	75.52%	74.85%		

The following candidates were elected: Dubilio Argüello Villalobos (PLN); Uladislao Gámez Solano (PLN); and Alfredo Vargas Fernández (PD).

==== 1940s ====
===== 1949 =====
The following candidates were elected at the 1949 general election held on 4 October 1949: José Francisco Benavides Robles (PUN); Carlos Elizondo Cerdas (PUN); Manuel Felipe Ramírez Fonseca (PUN); Samuel Sáenz Flores (PSD); and Fernando Vargas Fernández (PUN).
