= Marlene Madrigal Flores =

Costa Rican agricultural activist and politician

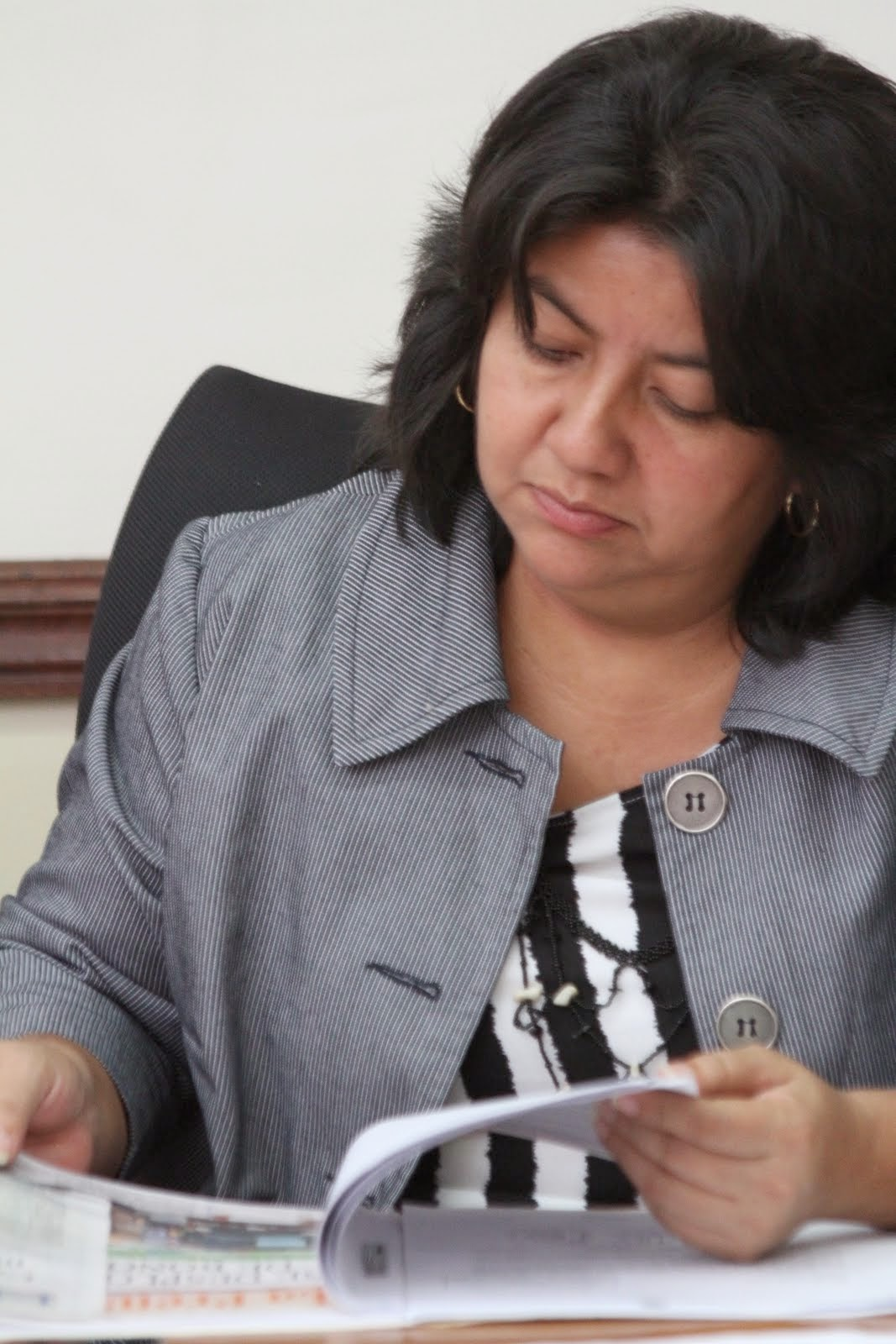
- Marlene Madrigal Flores in 2014

Deputy Legislative Assembly of Costa Rica
- In office 2014–2018
- Constituency: Heredia

Personal details
- Born: Costa Rica
- Party: Citizens' Action Party
- Profession: Agricultural activist, politician

Marlene Madrigal Flores is a Costa Rican agricultural worker activist and a current deputy from Heredia in the Legislative Assembly.

Madrigal has a technical education.

== Agricultural activist ==
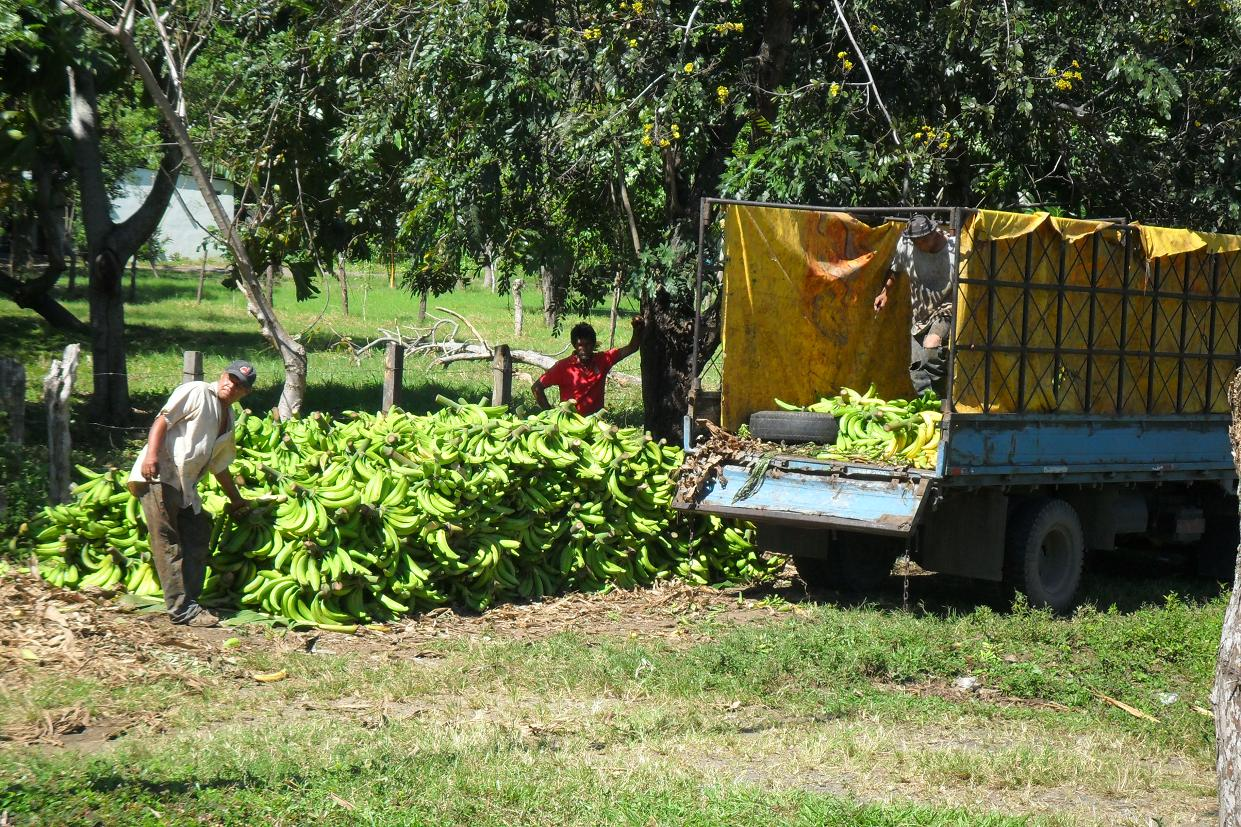
Madrigal has worked for banana companies and workers' unions in Costa Rica

Madrigal has worked in several capacities as an agricultural activist. She has been a Resister for Sarapiquí, Vice-President of the National Agricultural Commission, President of the National Federation of Banana Workers, and a promoter for the Citizens' Action Party (PAC for its Spanish initials) in Sarapiquí. She has also worked for a number of agricultural companies and international agricultural unions.

In 2013 alone, she visited the Legislative Assembly a total of 16 times.

== Political career ==
When Madrigal began running for deputy in 2013, she was 42 years old. She was elected as a PAC candidate alongside economist Henry Mora Jiménez. In the general election, Madrigal was elected and she will now serve for the 2014 to 2018 legislative term.
