= Costa Rican Confederation of Workers =

Costa Rican trade union center

CTRN
- Confederation of Workers Rerum Novarum
- Confederación de Trabajadores Rerum Novarum
- Founded: August 24, 1991
- Headquarters: San José, Costa Rica
- Location: Costa Rica
- Members: 90,000
- Key people: Lenin Hernandez Navas, president Mario Rojas Vílchez secretary general
- Affiliations: ITUC
- Website: www.rerumnovarum.or.cr

The Costa Rican Confederation of Workers (CTRN) Costa Rican trade union center. It was formed in 1991 by the merger of three union centres.

The CTRN is affiliated with the International Trade Union Confederation.

== See also ==
- Trade unions in Costa Rica
