= Confederación Unitaria de Trabajadores (Costa Rica) =

Costa Rican national trade union centre

CUT
- Confederación Unitaria de Trabajadores
- Founded: November 23, 1980
- Headquarters: San José, Costa Rica
- Location: Costa Rica
- Members: 75,000 (2004)
- Key people: Sol Salas Morales, General-Secretary
- Affiliations: WFTU

The Confederación Unitaria de Trabajadores (CUT) is a Costa Rican trade union national trade union centre formed in 1980 as a result of the merger of the Federación Nacional de Trabajadores Públicos and the Confederación General de Trabajadores. The CUT had 54 affiliated unions in 2004. It is affiliated with the World Federation of Trade Unions.

== See also ==
- Trade unions in Costa Rica
