= Fernando Sánchez Campos =

Costa Rican politician

Deputy to the Legislative Assembly of Costa Rica
- Constituency: Heredia

Personal details
- Born: 13 January 1974 San José, Costa Rica
- Party: National Liberation Party

Fernando Felipe Sánchez Campos (Note: In this name that follows Hispanic American naming customs, the first or paternal surname is Sánchez and the second or maternal family name is Campos.) (born January 13, 1974) is a Costa Rican politician.

== Biography ==
Fernando Felipe Sánchez Campos was born in San José, Costa Rica, on January 13, 1974. Married to María del Milagro Linares-Martín, together they have two children: Fernando Felipe and María Pía.

In terms of academic experience, he has served as rector, professor, tutor, researcher, guest speaker, and consultant at several academic institutions such as the University of Costa Rica and INCAE Business School, as well as at the University of Oxford, the University of Salamanca, and the Catholic University of Valencia. In addition, he has worked as a consultant for the Inter-American Institute of Human Rights (IIHR), specifically at the Centro de Asesoría y Promoción Electoral (CAPEL). Nowadays he serves as Rector Magnífico at the Catholic University of Costa Rica (UCAT), the official university of the Costa Rican Episcopal Conference (CECOR).

Likewise, he is currently First Vice President of the Organización de Universidades Católicas de América Latina y el Caribe (ODUCAL), Mexico, Central America and the Caribbean sub Region; and Vicepresident of the Asociación Unidad de Rectores de las Universidades Privadas de Costa Rica (UNIRE). Additionally, he has served as President of the Red de Universidades Católicas de América Central (RUCAC) and Vice President of the International Federation of Catholic Universities (IFCU).

Sánchez holds a Ph.D. (D.Phil.) in Politics by the University of Oxford (UK), a Master’s degree in Business Administration by INCAE Business School (Costa Rica), and a BA in Political Science by the University of Costa Rica (UCR). He has published eleven books and has also written several chapters in different books and various academic articles. Likewise, he has been awarded several prizes, distinctions and honors (in Costa Rica, Colombia, the UK, Spain, Italy and Vatican City). Fernando Sánchez is a Spanish native speaker and has fluent knowledge of English and Italian.

Sánchez was recently appointed as a full member of the Hispanic American Academy of Doctors.

== Political career ==
Fernando Felipe Sánchez Campos has worked in the public sector as a diplomat, representing the Republic of Costa Rica as Ambassador to the Holy See (The Vatican), to the Sovereign Order of Malta, and as Permanent Representative to the United Nations Rome-based agencies (Food and Agriculture Organization (FAO), International Fund for Agricultural Development (IFAD), and the World Food Programme (WFP)). He was elected by popular vote as a deputy to the Legislative Assembly, where he served chairing several central legislative commissions such as: the Permanent Commission for Social Welfare Affairs and the Special Permanent Commission on Foreign Affairs and International Trade.

== Books ==
- With García Gómez, Jaime and Rodríguez Vargas, Alexis, Informes 2017, 2019, 2021, 2024 and 2025, Índice de Ecología Integral Humanista (IEIH) del Observatorio Laudato si´(OLS) de Universidad Católica de Costa Rica (UCAT) (Costa Rica: UCAT Editorial, 2017, 2019, 2021, 2024 y 2025).
- Pilares de Nuestra Identidad: Universidad Católica de Costa Rica (Costa Rica: UCAT Editorial, 2023) (Editor).
- Fratelli tutti y la mejor política: los políticos responden (Costa Rica: UCAT Editorial, 2021) (Editor along with José Antonio Rosas Amor and Alexis Rodríguez Vargas).
- Laudato si´, el cuidado de la casa común: una conversión necesaria a la ecología humana (España: BAC, 2018) (Editor along with Father Federico Lombardi).
- Entre dos Papas: historias de una familia en el Vaticano (Costa Rica: E-Digital ED, 2015).
- Nace un hijo espiritual: nuestra historia con el Padre Pío de Pietrelcina (I edition in Spanish, Costa Rica: Editorial Guayacán, 2010; II edition in Spanish, Costa Rica: EDITORAMA, 2012).
- Nasce un Figlio Spirituale: la nostra storia con lui Padre Pio da Pietrelcina (Italia: Avagliano Editore, 2011) (I edition in Italian).
- A Spiritual Son is Born: Our Story with Padre Pio of Pietrelcina (The Philippines: ST. PAUL´S, 2014) (I edition in English).
- Nace un hijo espiritual: nuestra historia con el Padre Pío de Pietrelcina (Spain: San Pablo, 2021) (I edition by San Pablo, España).
- Partidos políticos, elecciones y lealtades partidarias en Costa Rica: erosión y cambio (España: Ediciones Universidad de Salamanca, 2007).
- Fortalecimiento de los partidos políticos en América Latina: institucionalización, democratización y transparencia. (Costa Rica: Serie Cuadernos de CAPEL, No.50, IIDH, 2006) (Editor along with José Thompson).
- Política y poder: reflexiones desde mi ventana (Costa Rica: Editorial LAM, 2005).
- With Colburn, Forrest D., Individuos versus instituciones en las democracias centroamericanas (Costa Rica: EDUCA, 2001).
- With Colburn, Forrest D., Empresarios centroamericanos y apertura económica (Costa Rica: EDUCA, 2000).
- With Colburn, Forrest D., Las democracias centroamericanas y sus habilidades para emprender reformas (Costa Rica: INCAE, 1999).

== Academic articles ==
- “Reflexiones sobre sabias reflexiones: a la búsqueda de una diplomacia que sea esperanza para todos”. Carità Política, N. 2 (diciembre 2013), p. 16.
- “The Catholic Church and Latin America: Role and Challenges”. Carità Política, N. 2 (December 2012), pp. 19–20.
- “Explaining Costa Rica’s Democratic Stability: The Political Legacy of the 1948 Civil War”. Bicentenario. Revista de Historia de Chile y América (in press).
- “La creación del Instituto de Formación y Estudios en Democracia y la importancia de la capacitación política”. Revista de Derecho Electoral, Número 3 (Primer Semestre 2007), pp. 23–33.
- “Cambio en la dinámica electoral en Costa Rica: un caso de desalineamiento”. América Latina Hoy 35 (diciembre 2003), pp. 115–146.
- “Democracia en América Latina: el peligro de la impaciencia”. Revista INCAE XIII (1) (2003), pp. 56–58.
- “Desalineamiento electoral en Costa Rica”, Revista de Ciencias Sociales. Universidad de Costa Rica 38 (2002), pp. 29–56.
- “Cambios políticos en Centroamérica: El desalineamiento electoral en Costa Rica”. Bicentenario. Revista de Historia de Chile y América 1(2) (2002), pp. 117–146.
- “Sistema electoral y partidos políticos: incentivos hacia el bipartidismo en Costa Rica”. Anuario de Estudios Centroamericanos 27(1) (2001), pp. 133–168.
- With Colburn, Forrest D., “Surviving the Competition in Central America”. Economic Reform Today 1 (2000), pp. 40–45.
- With Chinchilla, Fernando, “Transición hacia la democracia en República Dominicana: las elecciones de 1996”. Reflexiones 49 (agosto 1996), pp. 27–38.
