= Central del Movimiento de Trabajadores Costarricenses =

Costa Rican trade union center

CMTC
- Central del Movimiento de Trabajadores Costarricenses
- Founded: January 15, 1967
- Headquarters: San José, Costa Rica
- Location: Costa Rica
- Members: 65,000
- Key people: Olman Chinchilla, president Óscar Cruz Morales, general secretary
- Affiliations: ITUC

The Central del Movimiento de Trabajadores Costarricenses (CMTC) is a Costa Rican trade union center.

Originally created as the Federation of Christian Workers and Peasants of Costa Rica in 1967, it became the Central de Trabajadores Costarricenses in 1972, and the CMTC in the 1990s.

The Central del Movimiento de Trabajadores Costarricenses (CMTC) is a Costa Rican trade union federation founded in 1967 to represent the interests of workers across various sectors. It aims to promote and defend workers' rights, and organises labour unions in areas including the economy, public services, and social welfare.

The composition of the CMTC, maintains consistency with the conceptual framework of the Workers Movement, as developed by the Central Latinoamericana de Trabajadores - CLAT - which gives space to the labor unions to expand their necessary and severe work to do this together in a movement with other sectors such as autonomous economy, peasants, indigenous, migrants, disabled, pensioners, corporate, people, women, youth, childhood and adolescence and all forms organized to struggle for Social Justice, Welfare Integral and Dignity of the working class.

The CMTC is responsible for carrying out the integral, personal a collective promotion as Costa Rican workers, convinced that full release only occur with radical change of global economic, social, cultural and political structures in our country in which our working class must have a fundamental and protagonist role.

The CMTC is respectful for philosophical, political and religious beliefs of all its members and determines its own Declaration of Principles, Policy, Strategy and Platform of Struggle for realization of its objectives, with full independence from political parties; governments in power; political, economic and social centers; employers and religious or philosophical authorities.

It is affiliated with the International Trade Union Confederation.

== See also ==
- Trade unions in Costa Rica
