= Henry Mora Jiménez =

Costa Rican economist and politician (born 1959)

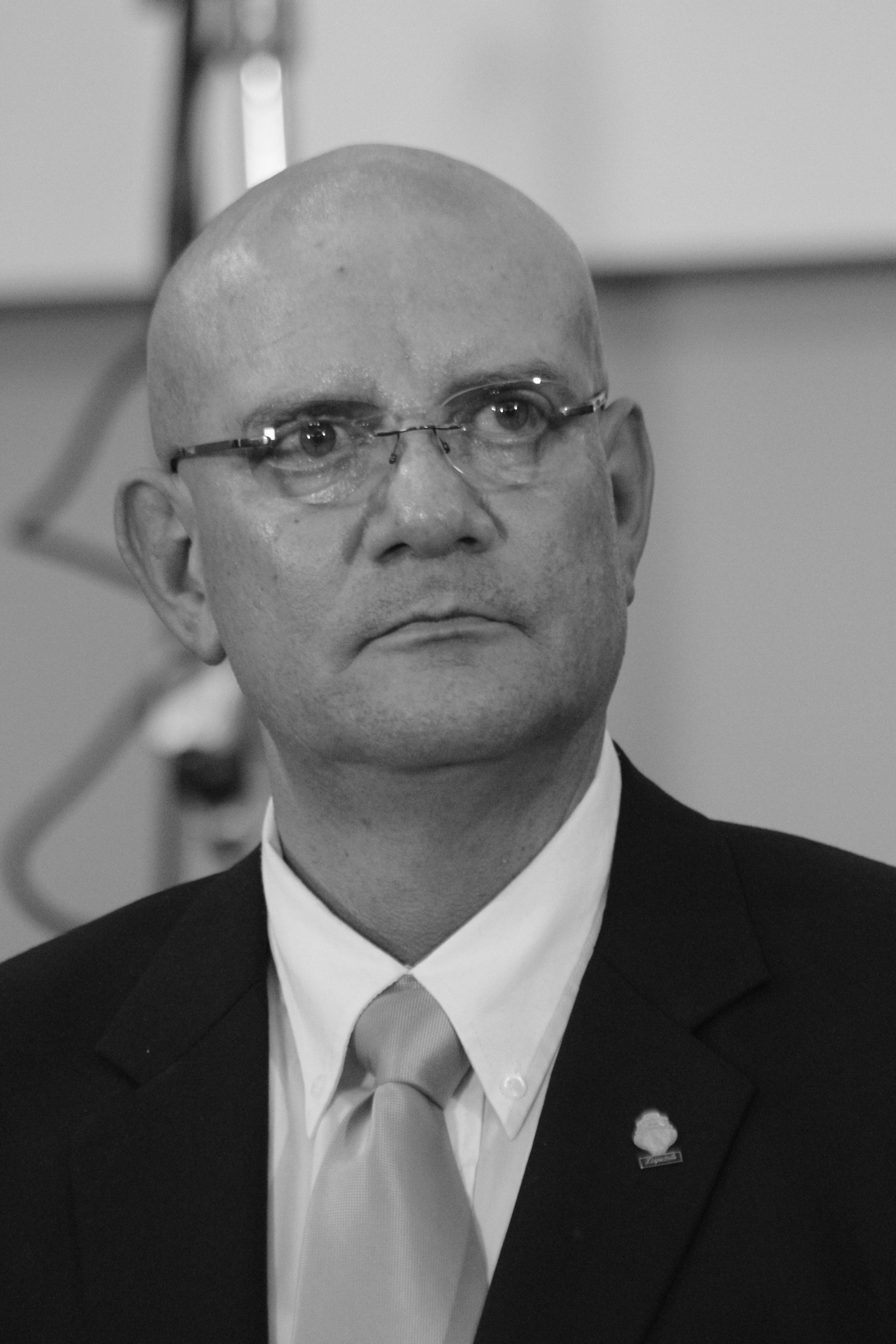
- Mora in 2014

52nd President of the Legislative Assembly of Costa Rica
- In office 1 May 2014 – 30 April 2015
- Preceded by: Luis Fernando Mendoza Jiménez
- Succeeded by: Rafael Ortiz Fábrega

Deputy of the Legislative Assembly of Costa Rica
- In office 1 May 2014 – 1 October 2017
- Preceded by: Víctor Hugo Víquez Chaverri
- Succeeded by: Steven Núñez Rímola
- Constituency: Heredia (1st Office)

Personal details
- Born: Henry Manuel Mora Jiménez; 10 April 1959 (age 67) Curridabat, Costa Rica
- Party: PAC
- Education: University of Costa Rica (BA); National University of Costa Rica (MA)
- Occupation: Economist; politician; professor; activist

Henry Manuel Mora Jiménez (born 19 April 1959) is a Costa Rican economist, academic and politician. A member of the Citizens' Action Party, he served as the 52nd President of the Legislative Assembly of Costa Rica from 2014 to 2015.

== Education and early career ==
Mora earned a licentiate in economics at the University of Costa Rica with an emphasis on statistics. From the National University of Costa Rica, Mora earned a Master's in political economics. He has postgraduate studies in Applied Economics at the Catholic University in Brabant (province) Netherlands. He earned a doctorate in Business and Economic Science from the Latin American University of Science and Technology in Costa Rica, and then studied as a post-doctorate in public goods at Tilburg University in Netherlands.

Mora has taught at several universities, including the National University, University of Costa Rica, Latin American University of Science and Technology. He has been a visiting professor in several universities in Latin America and Europe. Mora was also the Minister of National Planning and Economics. Mora is a member of the Sindicato de Trabajadores de la Universidad Nacional (Situn) (Union of National University Workers), and has worked with the Asociación Nacional de Empleados Públicos y Privados (ANEP) (National Association of Public and Private Employees).

== Authorship ==
Mora has worked as a columnist for El País, a Costa Rican newspaper and several online blogs. In addition, as a member of the Asociación Nacional de Empleados Públicos y Privados (National Association of Private and Public Employees), Jiménez wrote columns highly critical of ex-president Laura Chinchilla and her economic plans. In 2006, Mora came out against the Central American Free Trade Agreement.

In addition, Mora is the co-author, along with Franz J. Hinkelammert, a German resident of Costa Rica, of the book "Hacia una economía para la vida" ("Toward an economy for life"). The book is highly critical of capitalism, saying that when profits are maximized, capital is accumulated and not shared. Instead, a more equitable and sustainable economy needs to take its place. The book calls for a fundamental change in economic structure.

== Political career ==
In 2013, Mora became actively involved with PAC. He was 54 years old when he was elected to represent PAC for Heredia. PAC leaders said they would have Mora run for President of the Legislative Assembly when it convenes in May 2014. On 1 May 2014, he was approved and became the second PAC President of the Legislative Assembly, after Juan Carlos Mendoza. He said that his first order of business will be to delay a pay increase for legislative deputies, and one of his first official meetings was with members of ANEP.

Mora is still opposed to CAFTA, saying that it has produced no benefits for Costa Rica. He claims that neoliberal policies have not helped the sectors of the economy that impact the most people's lives.
