= Costa Rica–Israel relations =

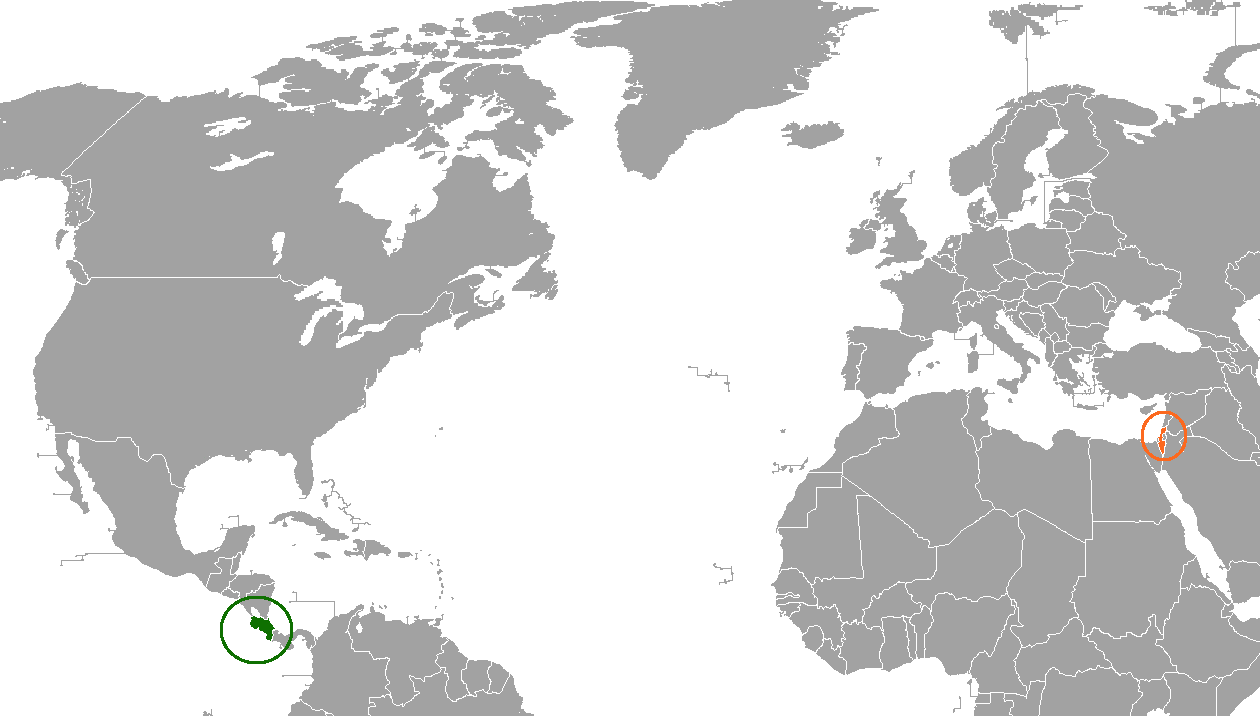

- Costa Rica: Israel

Costa Rica–Israel relations are the bilateral relations between Costa Rica and Israel.

== History ==
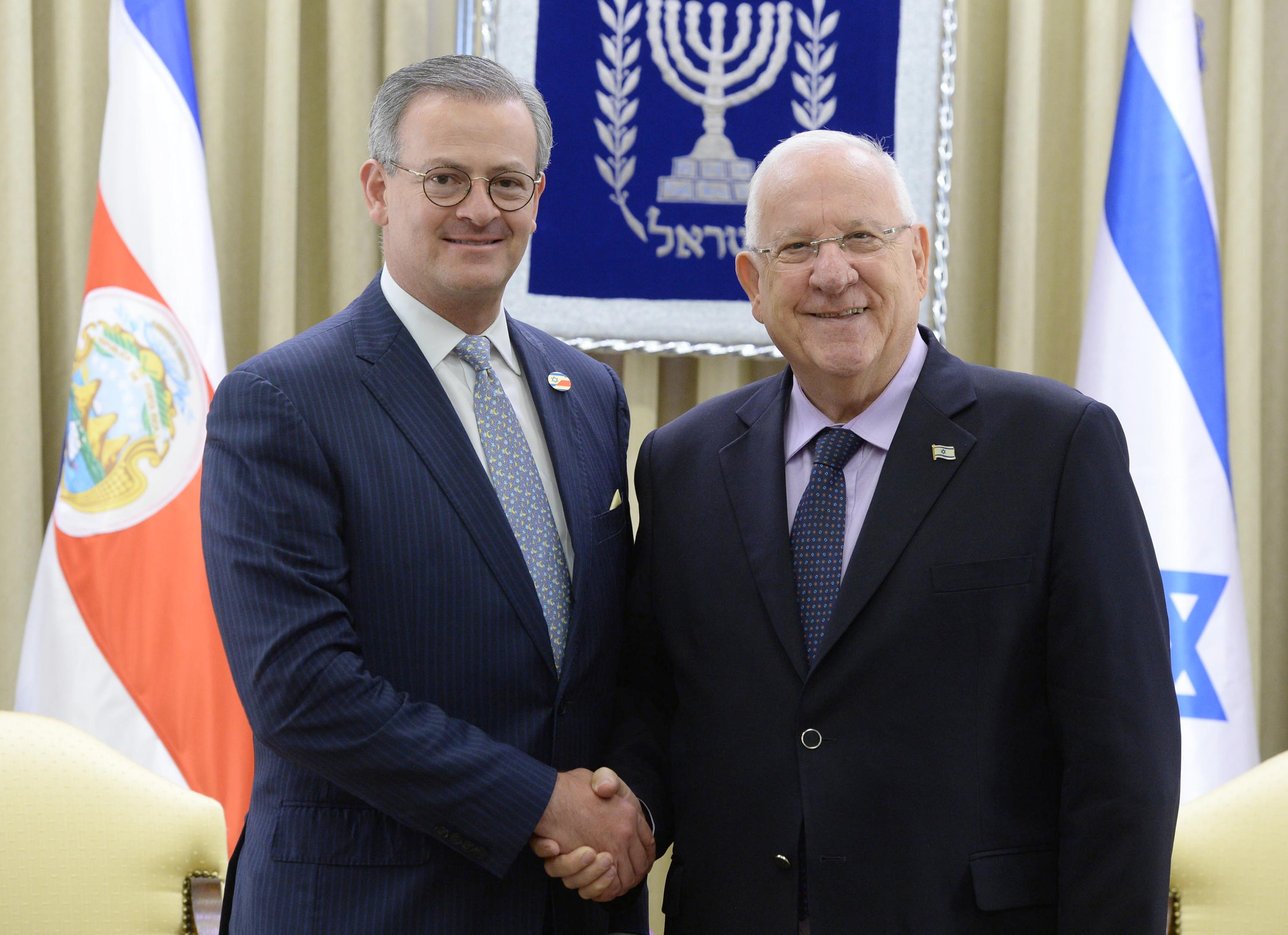
The Israeli President Reuven Rivlin receiving Manuel González Sanz, Costa Rican Minister of Foreign Affairs in 2017

In 1947, Costa Rica voted in favor of the Partition Plan, which would have established two states, one Arab, one Jewish, in what was then Mandatory Palestine. In 1962, the President of Costa Rica Francisco Orlich Bolmarcich visited Israel for six days. In 1963, Costa Rica opened its embassy in Jerusalem, and both countries signed a cultural convention treaty. The cultural convention treaty was upgraded in 1973. In 1966, Israel opened its embassy in San José. In 1968, Costa Rica and Israel agreed on a Mutual Visa exemption agreement. In 1973, the President of Costa Rica José Figueres Ferrer visited Israel, and in 1977 the President of Israel Ephraim Katzir visited Costa Rica for three days.

In 2006, Costa Rica moved its embassy to Tel Aviv, a move then-president Oscar Arias Sanchez said was intended to "rectify an historic error", maintain compliance with United Nations resolutions regarding the status of Jerusalem, and improve Costa Rican relations with Arab countries in the Middle East.

In 2015, 20 Costa Ricans parliamentarians launched a pro-Israel caucus.

In 2023, President Rodrigo Chaves Robles said that Costa Rica would consider moving its embassy in Israel back to Jerusalem from Tel Aviv. On 7 December 2025, Israeli Foreign Minister Gideon Sa'ar announced that Costa Rica would be opening a trade and innovation office with diplomatic status in Jerusalem.

On 18 September 2024, Costa Rica abstained from voting on a United Nations General Assembly resolution calling for Israel to withdraw from occupied Palestine. The resolution was proposed after the International Court of Justice issued an advisory opinion concluding that Israel's occupation of Palestine is illegal. In a statement, Costa Rica's Ministry of Foreign Affairs and Worship affirmed the importance of compliance with decisions issued by the International Court of Justice, but claimed that the resolution would require enacting "coercive economic measures that our country does not consider implementable".

During a December 2025 interview with Diario Extra, when asked about her position on ending bilaterial relations between Costa Rica and Israel, president-elect of Costa Rica Laura Fernandez Delgado said she believes in "strengthening" the country's ties with Israel.

== Economic relations ==
On 9 April 1995, Costa Rica and Israel signed a Trade and Economic Cooperation Agreement which entered into force on 28 March 1996.

In 2023, the Israeli Ministry of Agriculture reduced regulations on the import of pineapple from Costa Rica in order to reduce prices.

On 29 March 2023, a Memorandum of Understanding on Trade and Related Economic Cooperation was signed between the Costa Rican Ministry of Foreign Trade and the Israeli Ministry of Economy and Industry. The same day, the two countries jointly announced their decision to pursue a free trade agreement (FTA). Trade negotiations were scheduled to begin in October 2023, but were delayed after the October 7 attacks. On 18 October 2024, Costa Rica's Ministry of Foreign Trade announced that Costa Rica and Israel had jointly agreed to continue working towards a trade agreement.

Public opposition to the FTA in Costa Rica resulted in a march and demonstration on 27 September 2025, where signatures were collected to petition the government to terminate the trade negotiations. Activists cited the Gaza genocide as reason for their protest, arguing that accession to an FTA would make Costa Rica complicit in the genocide. Several Costa Rican municipalities also passed motions condemning the genocide and called on Chaves Robles, the Ministry of Foreign Trade, and the Ministry of Foreign Affairs and Worship to cease negotiations while the genocide continues.

On 8 December 2025, Costa Rica and Israel completed trade negotiations and signed a bilateral FTA. The agreement must be ratified by Costa Rica's Legislative Assembly before it will go into effect.

== Jewish community ==
Costa Rica has approximately 2,500 to 3,000 Jews.

== See also ==
- Costa Rica–Palestine relations
- Costa Rica–United States relations
- Foreign relations of Costa Rica
- Foreign relations of Israel
