= Americans in Costa Rica =

Costa Ricans of American birth or descent

Americans in Costa Rica "Estadounidenses en Costa Rica"
Total population
- 70,000–120,000

Regions with significant populations
- San José, Guanacaste, Puntarenas

Languages
- American English · Costa Rican Spanish

Related ethnic groups
- American diaspora

Americans in Costa Rica are attracted to the country's many advantages: a lower cost of living, high-quality, affordable healthcare, the tropical climate, the natural beauty of the land, and a stable democracy. According to a 2024 Forbes article, 120,000 Americans live in Costa Rica, and another 1.5 million visit as tourists. A 2025 Kiplinger article gives a figure of 70,000 expatriates.

== Visas ==
Unless a person has acquired citizenship, they require a visa in order to reside in Costa Rica. There are five types:

- Pensionado (for pensioners), a renewable, two-year visa which requires an income of $1000 per month
- Rentista, a renewable, two-year visa requiring income of $2500 a month or alternatively a $60,000 deposit in a Costa Rican bank
- Inversionista (for investors), a renewable, two-year visa requiring a $150,000 investment in Costa Rican real estate, stocks, bonds or a Costa Rican business
- Digital Nomad, a visa for people who might work remotely, requiring a foreign income of $3000 a month
- Student, a renewal one-year visa for those who attend school in Costa Rica and can support themself without working

For the first three types, after three years, the visa becomes permanent, and after seven years in total, the holder can apply for citizenship.

== Cost of living ==
In the 1980s, it was much cheaper to live in Costa Rica than the United States. However, the gap has decreased, and estimates range from Costa Rica being about 23% more affordable to possibly no real difference. Much depends on the lifestyle desired. Housing and healthcare remain significantly cheaper, but imports may be more expensive due to high import taxes.

== Health care ==
Some Americans come for medical tourism reasons. Healthcare in Costa Rica is less expensive than in the United States and of high quality. There are two systems of healthcare, one universal and one private. For Americans holding Pensionado, Rentista or Inversionista visas, the universal system provides unlimited care at a cost of 6-11% of monthly income paid into the Costa Rican Social Security Fund.

== Expatriate communities ==
There are expatriate communities throughout Costa Rica, the biggest being in Tamarindo district, Santa Ana, and the Central Valley.

== Education ==
As of 2025, 3 of the 29 faculty and 24 of the 180 students at the American International School of Costa Rica in San Jose were Americans.

== See also ==
- Costa Rican American
- Costa Rica–United States relations
