= Costa Rica–Palestine relations =

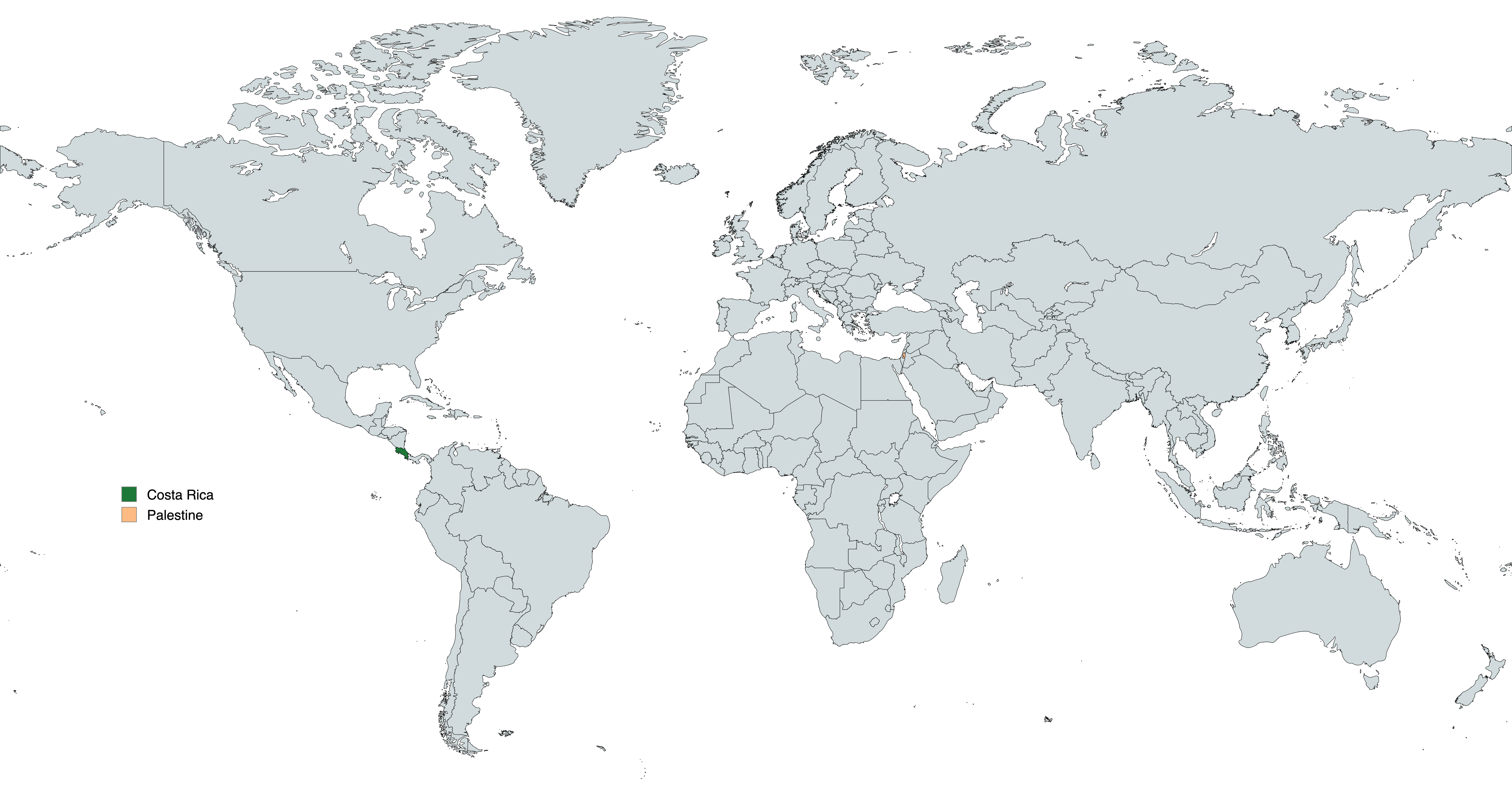

- Costa Rica: Palestine

Diplomatic mission
- Non-resident mission, The Hague: Non-resident mission, New York City

Envoy
- Ambassador Manuel Morales Ovares: Ambassador; Riyad Mansour

Formal diplomatic relations between Costa Rica and Palestine did not exist until Costa Rica recognized the State of Palestine on 5 February 2008 under then-President Óscar Arias Sánchez.

The shift in policy was made in the hopes of improving relations with Arab countries, from which Costa Rica had been cut off due to its decision to open its embassy to Israel in the city of Jerusalem. Less than two years before recognizing Palestine, Costa Rica moved its embassy in Israel from Jerusalem to Tel Aviv.

Recognition of Palestinian statehood was also intended to support Costa Rica's efforts to advance the Israeli–Palestinian peace process. At the time, Costa Rica was a non-permanent member of the United Nations Security Council.

== History ==
=== Prior to recognition of Palestine ===
In 1947, Costa Rica voted in favor of United Nations General Assembly Resolution 181, also called the Partition Plan, which, if implemented, would have established two states, one Arab, one Jewish, in what was then Mandatory Palestine. The Partition Plan was not implemented following the 1948 Palestine war and the resulting expulsion of Palestinians.

In November 1974, the UN General Assembly voted on Resolution 3237, which granted the Palestine Liberation Organization (PLO) the status of non-state observer, permitting the PLO to participate in the General Assembly as well as other institutions of the United Nations. Costa Rica voted against the resolution.

In December 1988, the UN General Assembly voted on Resolution 43/177, which acknowledged the Palestinian Declaration of Independence and changed the PLO's designation in the UN system to "Palestine". Costa Rica was one of 36 abstentions.

In 2006, Costa Rica moved its embassy in Israel from Jerusalem to Tel Aviv, a move then-President Arias announced was intended to "rectify an historic error". Arias noted that the shift in policy was part of a broader outreach towards the Arab world and maintained compliance with UN resolutions.

=== Recognition of Palestine ===
On 5 February 2008, Costa Rica recognized Palestine. The accord was made between Palestinian Ambassador to the United Nations Riyad Mansour and Costa Rican Ambassador to the United Nations Jorge Urbina in New York City. Mansour commented at the time that the change was made possible by the improvement of relations between Palestine and the United States. Then-Minister of Foreign Affairs and Worship Bruno Stagno Ugarte said that the decision was part of normalizing relations with the Arab world. Costa Rica could not afford to send an ambassador to Palestine proper at the time relations were established.

In 2009, Mansour began serving as non-resident ambassador of Palestine to Costa Rica. As of March 2026, Mansour still holds the position.

=== Following recognition of Palestine ===
In November 2012, the UN General Assembly voted on Resolution 67/19, which granted Palestine the status of non-member observer state. Costa Rica voted in favor of the resolution.

In 2024, the UN General Assembly voted on Resolution ES-10/23, which gave Palestine additional rights as a non-member observer state, but did not provide it with the right to vote in or become a member of the UN. Costa Rica voted in favor of the resolution.

In August 2025, rector of the University of Costa Rica Carlos Araya Leandro published an open letter titled "The University of Costa Rica stands in solidarity with the Palestinian people". The letter recognized the ongoing genocide in the Gaza Strip and called on the university community to mobilize in opposition to it. A march and demonstration were organized a month later in which activists and local municipalities called on the Costa Rican government to stop negotiating a free trade agreement with Israel while the genocide continues.

== State and official visits ==
In 1999, the Palestinian Centre for Human Rights received then-former President Arias in the Gaza Strip. Arias visited Jabalia Camp as well as what was then known as Gaza International Airport.

In 2025, Minister of Foreign Affairs and Worship Arnold André Tinoco received Mansour in Costa Rica.

== Diplomacy ==
Costa Rica's embassy in The Hague, headed by Manuel Morales Ovares, serves as its non-resident diplomatic mission to Palestine.

Palestine's Permanent Observer Mission to the United Nations in New York City, headed by Mansour, serves as its non-resident diplomatic mission to Costa Rica. Palestine also has an honorary consulate in Costa Rica.

== See also ==
- Costa Rica–Israel relations
- Costa Rica–United States relations
