= Manuel Tovar (politician) =

Costa Rican politician (born 1974)

- Official portrait, 2026

Minister of Foreign Affairs
- In office 8 May 2026 – 24 September 2026
- President: Laura Fernández
- Preceded by: Arnoldo André Tinoco
- Succeeded by: Ana Elena Pinto

Minister of Foreign Trade
- In office 8 May 2022 – 8 May 2026
- President: Rodrigo Chaves
- Preceded by: Andrés Valenciano Yamuni
- Succeeded by: Indiana Trejos Gallo

Personal details
- Born: Manuel Alejandro Tovar Rivera; 23 March 1974 (age 52) Barcelona, Spain
- Party: Independent
- Education: Complutense University of Madrid (MA); University of Salamanca (PhD)

Manuel Alejandro Tovar Rivera (born 28 March 1974) is a Costa Rican lawyer, political scientist and politician who served as minister of foreign affairs and worship in 2026. He previously served as minister of foreign trade from 2022 to 2026 and as the head of Costa Rica's delegation to the Organisation for Economic Co-operation and Development from 2016 to 2021.

== Career ==
Manuel Tovar Rivera was born in Barcelona, Spain, in 1974. He graduated in law from the Autonomous University of Central America (UACA) and also completed a master's degree in international law and international relations at Madrid's Complutense University and pursued a doctorate in political science at the University of Salamanca. He has also studied at Harvard University and the London School of Economics and Political Science.

From 2005 to 2008, he was a trade negotiator with the Ministry of Foreign Trade, where his duties included coordinating commercial relations with Canada and with Chile. In 2008 he was appointed trade attaché at the Costa Rican embassy to Belgium and Luxembourg and special envoy of the Costa Rican mission to the European Union, during which time he worked on the Central America–European Union Association Agreement, which was ultimately signed in 2012. He also served as the delegate to the World Customs Organization and the European Investment Bank.

In 2013 he relocated to Paris to take office as special envoy to the Organisation for Economic Co-operation and Development (OECD), tasked with negotiating Costa Rica's membership of the organization; he was promoted to head of delegation in 2016 and oversaw Costa Rica's admission in 2021.

In 2022, newly elected president Rodrigo Chaves selected Tovar to serve in his cabinet as minister of foreign trade, a position where he remained throughout Chaves's term in office. The conclusion of negotiations for Costa Rica's accession to the Comprehensive and Progressive Agreement for Trans-Pacific Partnership (CPTPP) was announced at the end of Tovar's time as minister.

Tovar Rivera was appointed minister of foreign affairs by incoming president Laura Fernández on 8 May 2026. During his tenure, he attended the General Assembly of the Organization of American States (OAS) in Panama City, where he denounced the worsening situation and foreign interference in neighboring Nicaragua. He also lobbied for Rebeca Grynspan's candidacy to serve as Secretary-General of the United Nations in Europe and at the 81st United Nations General Assembly.

President Fernández dismissed Tovar on 24 September for failing to inform her of a strategic meeting of the Shield of the Americas initiative with high-ranking officials from other countries, including U.S. president Donald Trump, and taking it upon himself to attend without seeking authorization. He was replaced on an interim basis by Minister of Foreign Trade Indiana Trejos Gallo, and Ana Elena Pinto took office as his permanent replacement on 15 October.
