= Rodolfo Solano =

Costa Rican politician

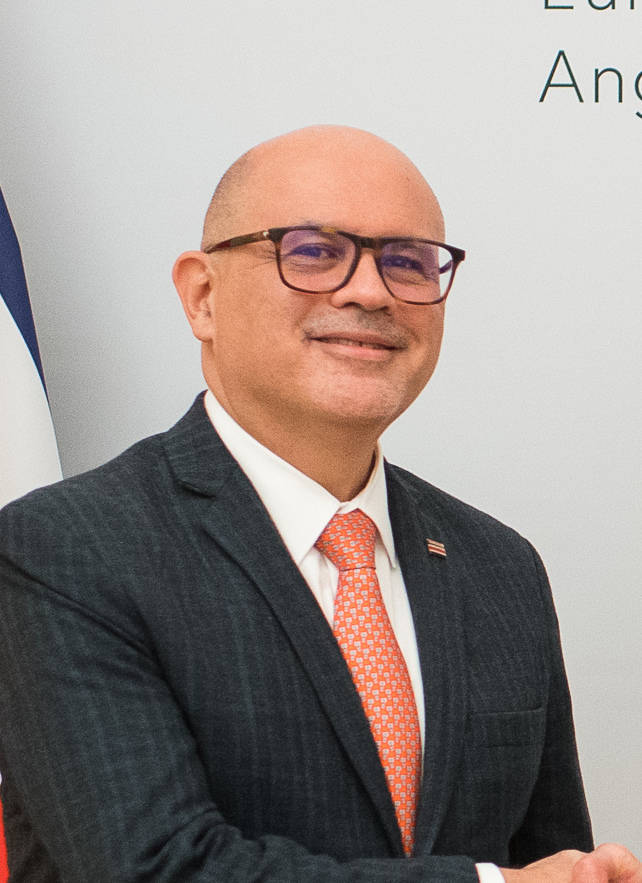
- Rodolfo Solano in 2021

Minister of Foreign Affairs and Worship
- In office January 2020 – 8 May 2022
- Succeeded by: Arnoldo André Tinoco

Rodolfo Solano Quirós (Note: In this name that follows Hispanic American naming customs, the first or paternal surname is Solano and the second or maternal family name is Quirós.) is a Costa Rican politician who served as Minister of Foreign Affairs and Worship in 2020–2022.

== Notes ==
Political offices
Preceded by Manuel Ventura	Minister of Foreign Affairs; 2020–2022	Succeeded by Arnoldo André Tinoco
