= Embassy of Costa Rica, Washington, D.C. =

Embassy of Costa Rica in Washington, D.C.
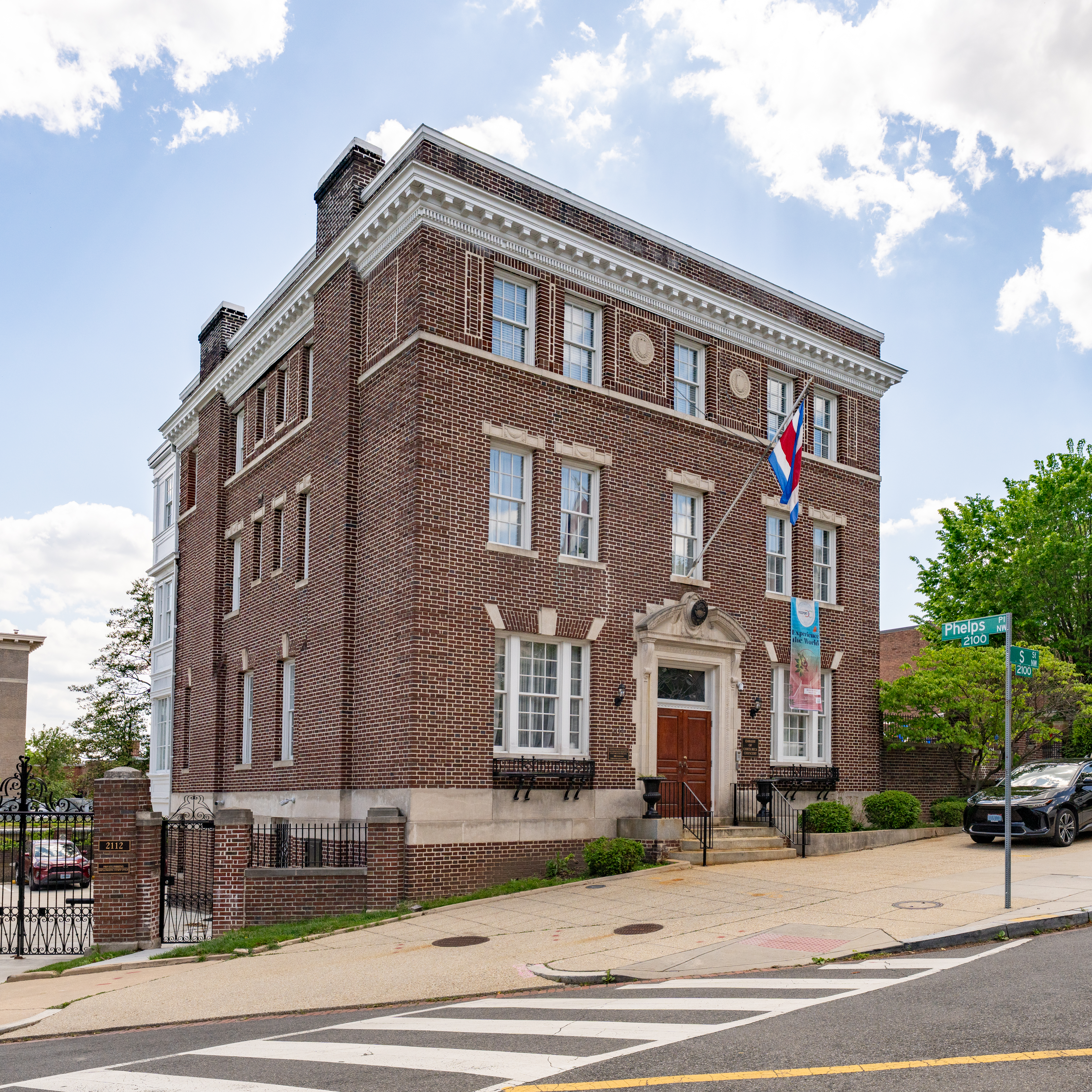
- Embassy of Costa Rica in 2026
- Location: Washington, DC, United States
- Address: 2114 S Street, N.W.
- Coordinates: 38°54′49″N 77°02′52″W
- Ambassador: Catalina Crespo Sancho
- Website: www.embassycr.org

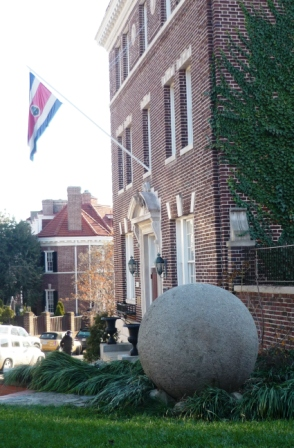
Stone sphere at the Embassy

The Embassy of Costa Rica in Washington, D.C. is the diplomatic mission of Costa Rica to the United States. It is located at 2114 S Street Northwest, Washington, D.C. in the Kalorama neighborhood.

The embassy also operates Consulates-General in Atlanta, Houston, Los Angeles, Miami and New York City.

The ambassador is Catalina Crespo Sancho.

In 1974, the Embassy received one of the three pre-Columbian stone spheres of Costa Rica that came to the United States as part of an agreement that had been negotiated in 1971 between American art specialist Samuel Adams Green and the Museo Nacional de Costa Rica together with the Costa Rican Ministry of Foreign Affairs and Ministry of Culture. The two larger spheres went to Fairmount Park in Philadelphia, where they were displayed in 1976 together with other monumental sculptures, before going into storage at the warehouses of the Fairmont Park Association. The one in Washington D.C. is displayed in the streetside yard of the Embassy building, as a symbol of national identity.

== See also ==
- Costa Rica–United States relations
