= List of ambassadors of Canada to Costa Rica =

List of ambassadors

Ambassador of Canada to Costa Rica
- Incumbent; Elizabeth Williams since September 17, 2021
- Seat: Embassy of Canada, San Jose
- Nominator: Prime Minister of Canada
- Appointer: Governor General of Canada
- Term length: At His Majesty's pleasure
- Inaugural holder: Jean-Louis Délisle
- Formation: March 16, 1961

The ambassador of Canada to Costa Rica is the official representative of the Canadian government to the government of Costa Rica. The official title for the ambassador is Ambassador Extraordinary and Plenipotentiary of Canada to the Republic of Costa Rica. The ambassador of Canada to Costa Rica is Elizabeth Williams who was appointed on the advice of Prime Minister Justin Trudeau on September 17, 2021.

The Embassy of Canada is located at La Sabana Executive Business Centre, Building No. 5, 3rd Floor, behind the Contraloría General de la República, San José, Costa Rica.

== History of diplomatic relations ==
Diplomatic relations between Canada and Costa Rica was established on January 20, 1961. Jean-Louis Délisle was appointed as Canada's first Ambassador in Costa Rica on March 16, 1961.

== List of ambassadors of Canada to Costa Rica ==
No.	Name	Term of office			Career	Prime Minister nominated by	Ref.
No.	Name	Start Date	PoC.	End Date	Career	Prime Minister nominated by	Ref.
1	Jean-Louis Délisle	March 16, 1961	June 27, 1961	May 26, 1964	Career	John G. Diefenbaker (1957–1963)	
2	William George Marcel Olivier	August 13, 1964	June 27, 1964	July 31, 1966	Career	Lester B. Pearson (1963-1968)	
3	Arthur John Hicks	June 21, 1966	October 13, 1966	November 29, 1968	Career	Lester B. Pearson (1963-1968)	
4	Donald W. Munro	November 5, 1968	December 19, 1968	November 7, 1971	Career	Pierre Elliott Trudeau (1968–1979)	
5	Gilbert Craig Langille	August 25, 1971		March 12, 1975	Career	Pierre Elliott Trudeau (1968–1979)	
–	William Edward Magee (Chargé d'Affaires)	March 14, 1975		December 3, 1975	Career	Pierre Elliott Trudeau (1968–1979)	
6	Ralph Edward Reynolds	October 21, 1975	December 3, 1975	June 30, 1978	Career	Pierre Elliott Trudeau (1968–1979)	
–	Robert R.M. Logie (Chargé d'Affaires)	August 15, 1978		September 4, 1979	Career	Pierre Elliott Trudeau (1968–1979)	
7	Robert Douglas Sirrs	April 4, 1979	September 4, 1979	July 29, 1982	Career	Pierre Elliott Trudeau (1968–1979)	
8	Francis Miles Filleul	September 22, 1982		1986	Career	Pierre Elliott Trudeau (1968–1979)	
9	Stanley Edward Gooch	July 23, 1986	September 24, 1986	July 15, 1989	Career	Brian Mulroney (1984-1993)	
10	Henry Garfield Pardy	September 28, 1989		September 10, 1992	Career	Brian Mulroney (1984-1993)	
11	Paul D. Durand	August 27, 1992	September 29, 1992	July 15, 1995	Career	Brian Mulroney (1984-1993)	
12	Dan E. Goodleaf	July 15, 1995	October 1, 1995	August 31, 1998	Career	Jean Chrétien (1993-2003)	
13	Denis Thibault	August 4, 1998	September 8, 1998	2001	Career	Jean Chrétien (1993-2003)	
14	Louise Léger	August 20, 2001	October 10, 2001	2004	Career	Jean Chrétien (1993-2003)	
15	Mario Laguë	September 14, 2004	October 11, 2004	2007	Career	Paul Martin (2003-2006)	
16	Neil Reeder	October 29, 2007	November 29, 2007	2010	Career	Stephen Harper (2006-2015)	
17	Cameron MacKay	August 10, 2010	August 31, 2010	2012	Career	Stephen Harper (2006-2015)	
18	Wendy Drukier	August 15, 2012	October 5, 2012	2015	Career	Stephen Harper (2006-2015)	
19	Michael Gort	July 31, 2015	October 22, 2015	August 10, 2017	Career	Stephen Harper (2006-2015)	
20	James Hill	October 25, 2017	December 6, 2017	December 15, 2021	Career	Justin Trudeau (2015–Present)	
21	Elizabeth Williams	September 17, 2021	January 28, 2022		Career	Justin Trudeau (2015–Present)	

== See also ==
- Canada–Costa Rica relations
