= Colombia–Costa Rica relations =

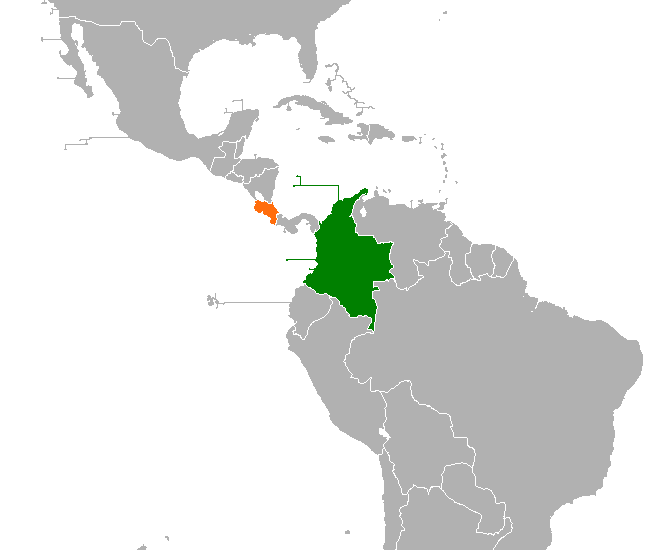

- Colombia: Costa Rica

Colombia–Costa Rica relations refer to the bilateral relations between Costa Rica and Colombia.

Historically, both countries were part of the Spanish Empire until the beginning of the 19th century. Today, both countries are full members of the Rio Group, the Latin Union, the Association of Spanish Language Academies, the Organization of American States, the Organization of Ibero-American States, the Community of Latin American and Caribbean States, the Cairns Group, and the Group of 77.

== History ==
Costa Rica and Colombia formalized their diplomatic relations with the signing of the Calvo-Herrán Treaty on June 11, 1856. Although as a result of the independence of Panama, recognized by Costa Rica on December 29, 1903, there is no longer a land border between Costa Rica and Colombia, both countries continue to share a considerable maritime border.

== Bilateral agreements ==
The two nations have signed several bilateral agreements such as a Technical and Scientific Cooperation Agreement between the Republic of Colombia and the Republic of Costa Rica (1980); Cultural Agreement between the Republic of Colombia and the Republic of Costa Rica (1980); Complementary Agreement on Tourism Cooperation between the Government of the Republic of Colombia and the Government of the Republic of Costa Rica (1996); Complementary Agreement for the Development of the Cooperation Program between the Government of the Republic of Colombia and the Government of the Republic of Costa Rica for the implementation of Horizontal Cooperation in the Areas of Environment and Energy (2000); Agreement between the Government of the Republic of Colombia and the Government of the Republic of Costa Rica, supplementary to the Convention on Technical and Scientific Cooperation for the establishment of a program of social strengthening and support for peace (2002); Free Trade Agreement, signed by the Presidents of Colombia and Costa Rica in Cali (2013); Air Transport Agreement (2015) and a Free Trade Agreement (2016).

== Trade ==
The products exported from Costa Rica to Colombia include lead ore, tires, food preparations, medicaments, artificial parts of the body, bars and rods of iron or steel, syringes, needles, catheters, cannulae, and tube or pipe fittings. The products Costa Rica imported from Colombia are related to medicaments, polypropylene, fertilizers, fungicides, carbon, woven fabrics of synthetic filament yarn, polyethylene, perfumes, and make-up.

In 2022, Colombia exported $355M to Costa Rica. The products exported from Colombia to Costa Rica included Packaged Medicaments ($26.6M), Carbon ($17.3M), and Perfumes ($12.3M). At the same time, Costa Rica exported $102M to Colombia. The products exported from Costa Rica to Colombia were Raw Lead ($17.7M), Medical Instruments ($11.8M), and Orthopedic Appliances ($11.2M).

== Resident diplomatic missions ==
- Costa Rica has an embassy in Bogotá.
- Colombia has an embassy in San José.

== See also ==
- Foreign relations of Colombia
- Foreign relations of Costa Rica
