= Argentina–Costa Rica relations =

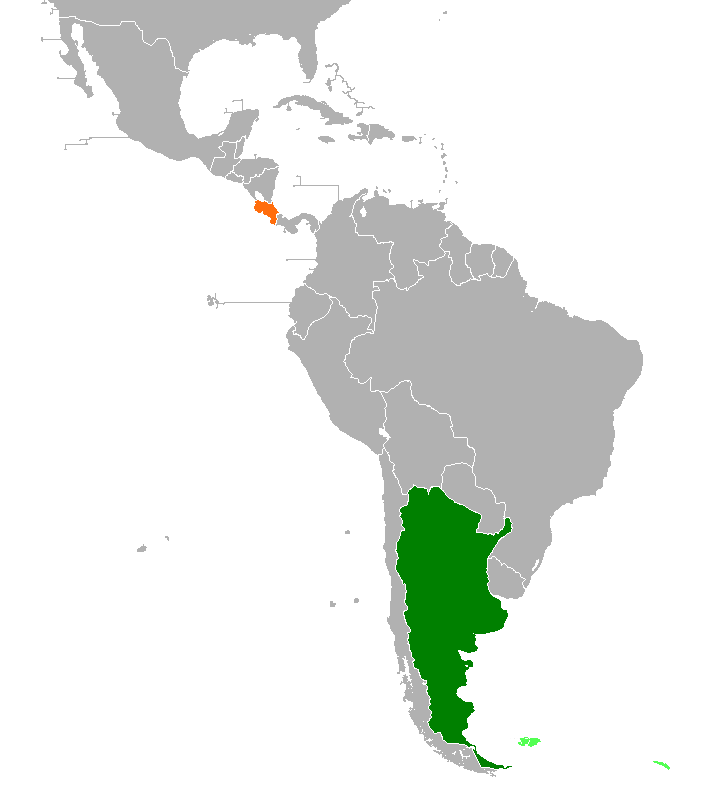

- Argentina: Costa Rica

Argentina–Costa Rica relations refer to the bilateral relations between Argentina and Costa Rica. Both nations are members of the Community of Latin American and Caribbean States, Group of 77, Organization of American States, Organization of Ibero-American States and the United Nations.

== History ==
Relations began in 1862 with the exchange of handwritten notes between the leaders of both countries and were formalized diplomatically in 1880 with the appointment of José Agustín de Escudero as Costa Rica's resident minister in Buenos Aires. Argentina’s first consular agent in Costa Rica was José María Castro Fernández, who was recognized as consul in 1883. The first diplomatic agent was the plenipotentiary minister Federico Quintana, who presented his credentials on 18 August 1919. During the administration of President José Joaquín Rodríguez Zeledón, relations between Costa Rica and Argentina were characterized by a spirit of cordiality and cooperation.

== Diplomatic missions ==
Costa Rica maintains an embassy in Buenos Aires, while Argentina maintains an embassy in San José.

== See also ==
- Foreign relations of Argentina
- Foreign relations of Costa Rica
