= Costa Rican Americans =

Americans of Costa Rican birth or descent

Total population
- 154,784; 0.05% of the U.S. population (2018)

Regions with significant populations
- New York Metro Area, Greater Boston, Philadelphia metropolitan area, Washington metropolitan area, North Carolina, Georgia, Florida, Texas, Denver metropolitan area, Seattle metropolitan area, Los Angeles metropolitan area

Languages
- American English, Spanish, Spanglish

Religion
- Predominantly Roman Catholic, minority Protestant

Related ethnic groups
- Hispanic Americans, Afro–Costa Ricans, Indigenous Costa Ricans, British Americans, Polish Americans, Italian Americans, Spanish Americans, German Americans, French Americans, Lebanese Americans, Syrian Americans, Indian Americans, Chinese Americans, Japanese Americans, Korean Americans, Native Americans

Costa Rican Americans (estadounidenses de origen costarricense) are Americans of at least partial Costa Rican descent.

The Costa Rican American population in 2018 was 154,784. Costa Ricans are the fourth smallest Hispanic group and the smallest Central American population in the United States.

Costa Rican populations are prominent in the New York metropolitan area, especially in North Central New Jersey (Essex County, New Jersey, Passaic County, New Jersey, Somerset County, New Jersey, and Union County, New Jersey). Additional areas with significant Costa Rican residents include New York City, Suffolk County, New York, and Fairfield County, Connecticut. There are also sizable groups of Costa Ricans in the Los Angeles metropolitan area, South Florida metropolitan area, and Lincoln County, North Carolina.

== History ==
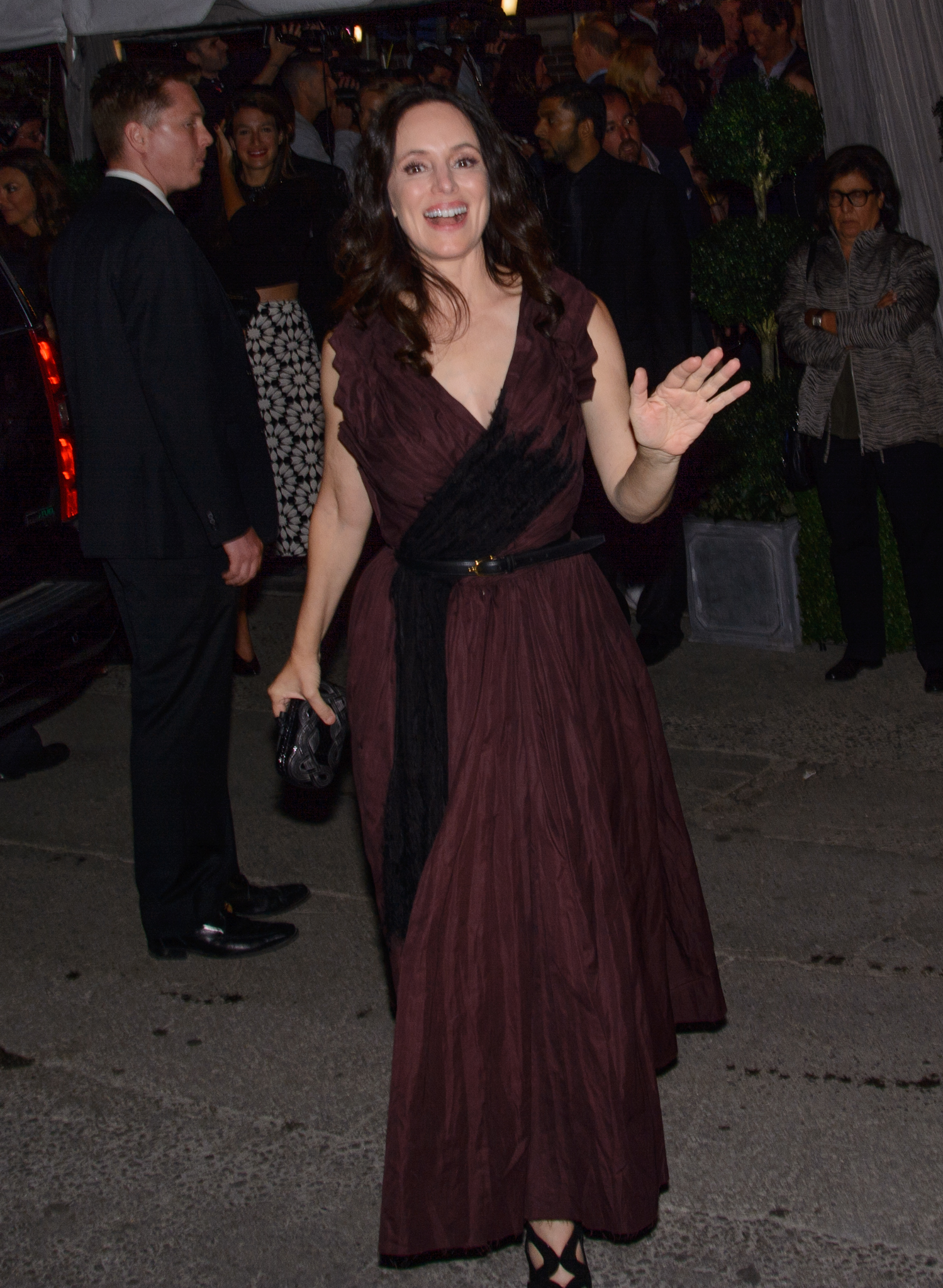
Madeleine Stowe actress at the 2014 Toronto International Film Festival

Costa Rican immigration to the United States, as a percentage of total immigration from Central America, has been declining since 1960. In the period from 1960 to 2009, total immigration from Costa Rica to the United States represented only three percent of total immigration from Central America over the same period. Lower prices and higher wages in the United States serve as strong motivators for Costa Ricans to emigrate. As with many other groups of immigrants, Costa Ricans send roughly $650 million in remittances every year to support their families in Costa Rica.

The largest communities of Costa Ricans in the United States are in California, Texas, Florida, and the New York metropolitan area, including parts of New Jersey, the state with the highest percentage of individuals identifying as Costa Rican. The town of Bound Brook, New Jersey has the highest percentage of Costa Ricans at 11.82 percent. Reasons for the phenomenon of Costa Rican immigration to New Jersey specifically are unclear, but some, including Costa Rican consulate-general Ana Villalobos and Costa Rican ambassador to the United States Roman Macaya, have posted that this immigration occurs along existing familial ties beginning with the first Costa Rican immigrants to the United States. Former President of Costa Rica Luis Guillermo Solis recognized the special case of Costa Ricans in Bound Brook when he visited the town in 2014 to celebrate Costa Rica's independence while in the United States for a United Nations conference.

Naturalization rates among Costa Ricans have remained fairly steady since 2000. In 2000, 1,895 individuals who identified their country of origin as Costa Rica became naturalized citizens of the United States. In 2017, there were 1,720 individuals of the same category who became naturalized. In the period from 2000 to 2009, 45.7 percent of all Costa Rican immigrants to the United States became naturalized citizens, close to the average for most immigrant groups. In 2000, 1,324 Costa Ricans were admitted to the United States as lawful permanent residents. In 2017, 2,184 individuals of the same category were admitted.

According to reporting from the Washington Post, undocumented immigrants travel along connections set up by businesses looking to take advantage of cheap undocumented labor. For example, The Trump Organization funneled undocumented Costa Rican immigrants to Bedminster, New Jersey, where they worked on the company's golf courses in various capacities along with undocumented immigrants from other Latin American countries.

- In part due to low numbers of Costa Rican immigrants in the United States, the formation of communities in the U.S. that are uniquely Costa Rican in character is uncommon; most Costa Rican immigrants tend to assimilate.
- " Historically Costa Rica has been an exception to the trend toward military regimes, violent changes of power and local wars in Third World countries"

== Culture ==
Costa Rican Americans frequently participate in cultural traditions practiced by other Latin Americans, such as Cinco de Mayo and Mexico's independence, September 15, in addition to their own celebrations. As Costa Rican Americans assimilate into United States society, they leave behind some of their more traditional customs and adopt the practices of American holidays and special events, like the Fourth of July. As a result, second- and third-generation Americans of Costa Rican descent are generally not familiar with traditional aspects of Costa Rican culture as it is practiced in the country itself. However, in areas where there is a high concentration of Costa Rican immigrants like New Jersey, Costa Ricans will gather and engage in social activities, e.g. at Costa Rican institutions like the Restaurante Puerto Viejo. "The Caribbean coastal regions are low-lying and heavily forested, while a chain of mountains parallels the Pacific coast."

== Language ==
A feature common to spoken Spanish in Costa Rica and other regions of Latin America is the voseo or ustedeo basic difference in Costa Rican Spanish. Younger generations of Costa Rican Americans are no longer using it as frequently in their spoken Spanish, likely due to intermingling with other Spanish-speaking immigrants from regions where the utilization of the voseo does not occur.

== Demographics ==
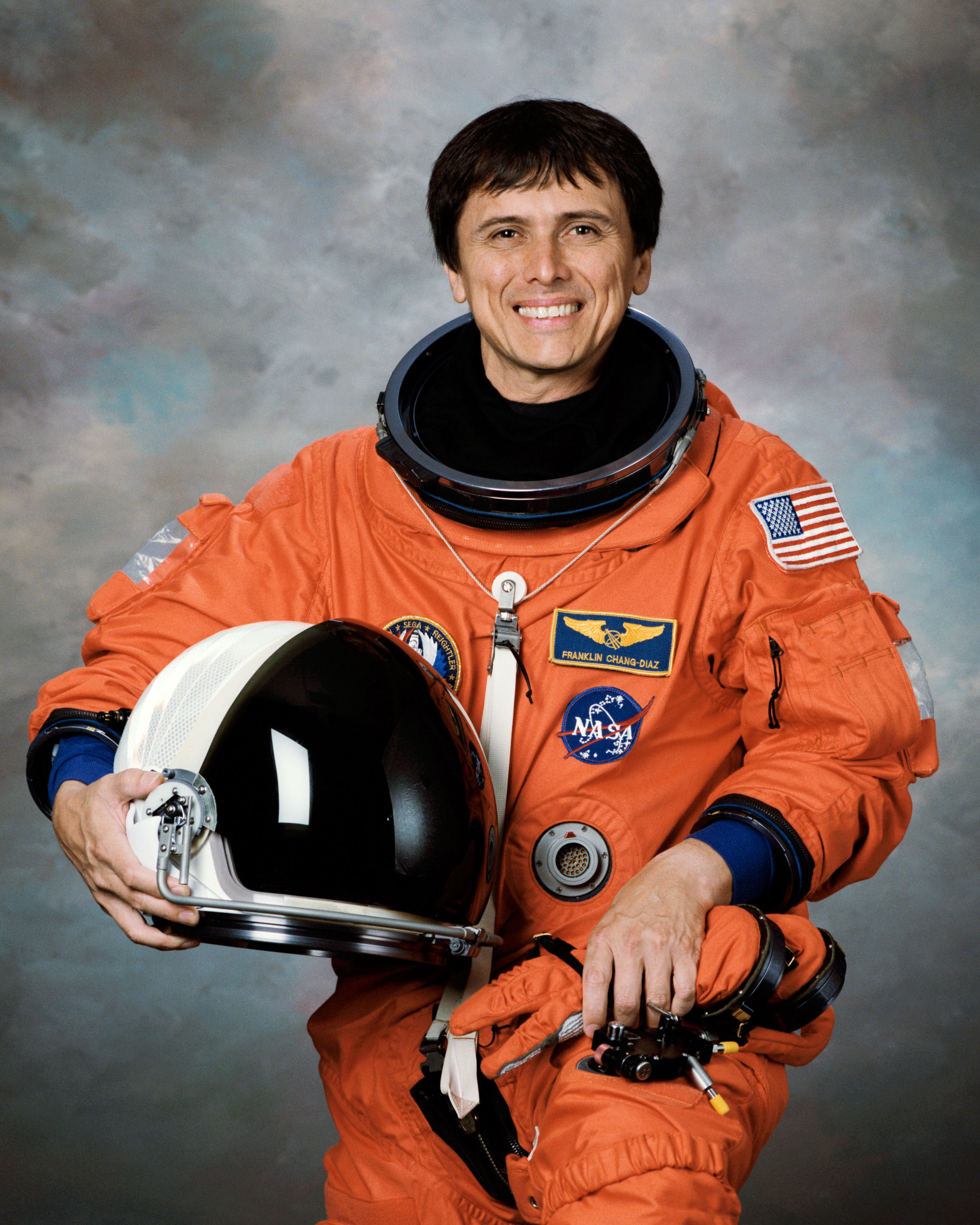
Franklin Chang Díaz is a mechanical engineer, physicist, and former NASA astronaut.

=== List of Costa Rican American communities ===
These are lists that indicated the largest populations of Costa Rican Americans according to states, residence areas and percentages.

=== States ===
The ten states with the largest population of Costa Ricans (Source: 2010 Census):

1. California - 22,469
2. Florida - 20,761
3. New Jersey - 19,993
4. New York - 11,576
5. Texas - 6,982
6. North Carolina - 4,658
7. Georgia - 3,114
8. Pennsylvania - 3,048
9. Massachusetts - 2,951
10. Connecticut - 2,767

=== Areas ===
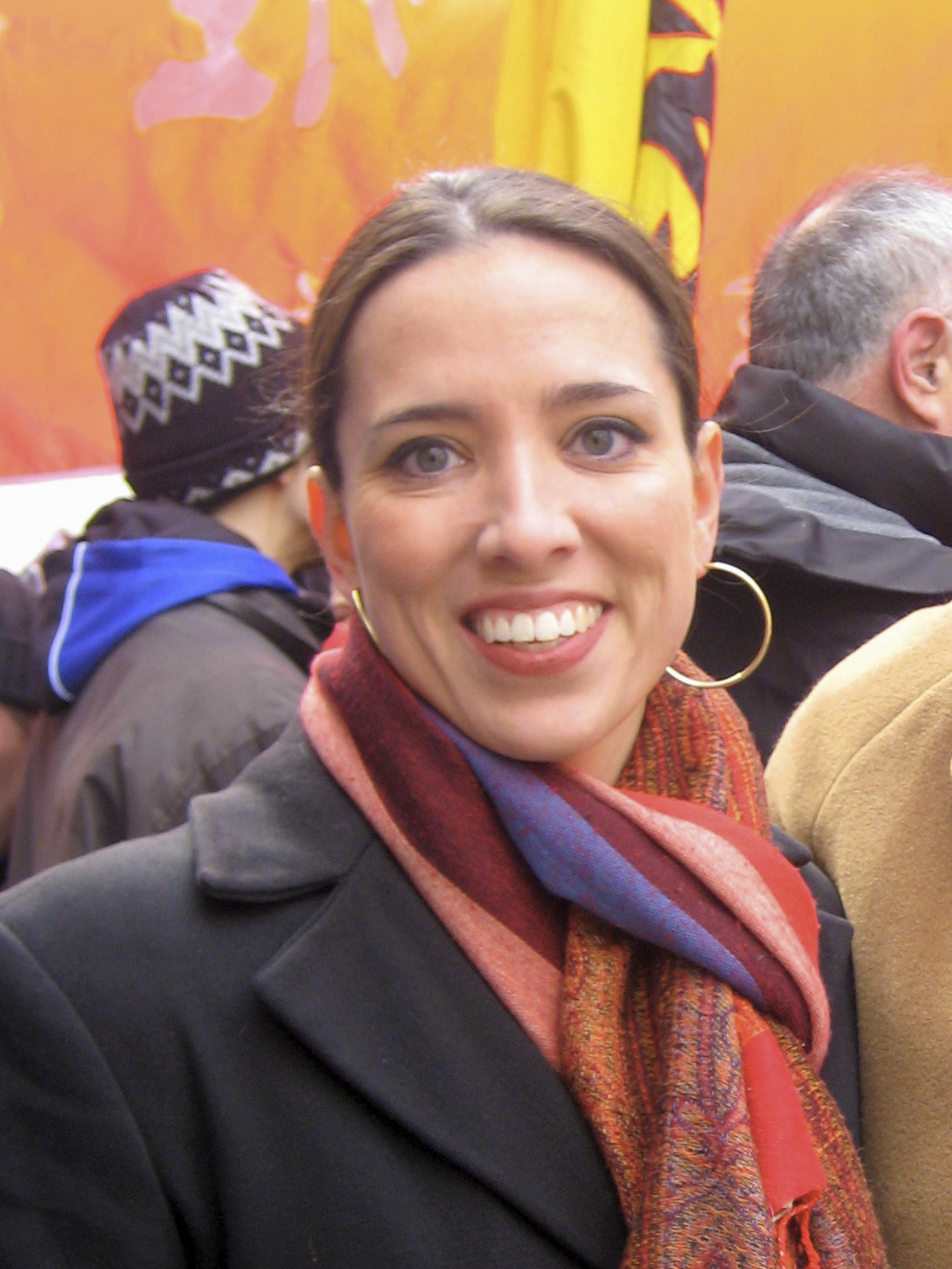
Sonia Chang-Díaz politician who represents the 2nd Suffolk District in the Massachusetts Senate.

The largest population of Costa Ricans are situated in the following areas (Source: Census 2010):

1. New York-Northern New Jersey-Long Island, NY-NJ-PA MSA - 27,394
2. Miami-Fort Lauderdale-Pompano Beach, FL MSA - 11,528
3. Los Angeles-Long Beach-Santa Ana, CA MSA - 11,371
4. Washington-Arlington-Alexandria, DC-VA-MD-WV MSA - 3,207
5. Riverside-San Bernardino-Ontario, CA MSA - 3,125
6. Houston-Sugar Land-Baytown, TX MSA - 2,717
7. Philadelphia-Camden-Wilmington, PA-NJ-DE-MD MSA - 2,617
8. Atlanta-Sandy Springs-Marietta, GA MSA - 2,433
9. Tampa-St. Petersburg-Clearwater, FL MSA - 2,372
10. Boston-Cambridge-Quincy, MA-NH MSA - 2,330
11. San Francisco-Oakland-Fremont, CA MSA - 2,321
12. Dallas-Fort Worth-Arlington, TX MSA - 2,296
13. Orlando-Kissimmee-Sanford, FL MSA - 2,292
14. Bridgeport-Stamford-Norwalk, CT MSA - 2,025
15. Trenton-Princeton, NJ MSA - 1,801
16. San Diego-Carlsbad-San Marcos, CA MSA - 1,749
17. Chicago-Joliet-Naperville, IL-IN-WI MSA - 1,618
18. Charlotte-Gastonia-Rock Hill, NC-SC MSA - 1,263
19. Phoenix-Mesa-Glendale, AZ MSA - 1,200
20. Las Vegas-Paradise, NV MSA - 1,027

=== U.S. communities with largest population of people of Costa Rican ancestry ===
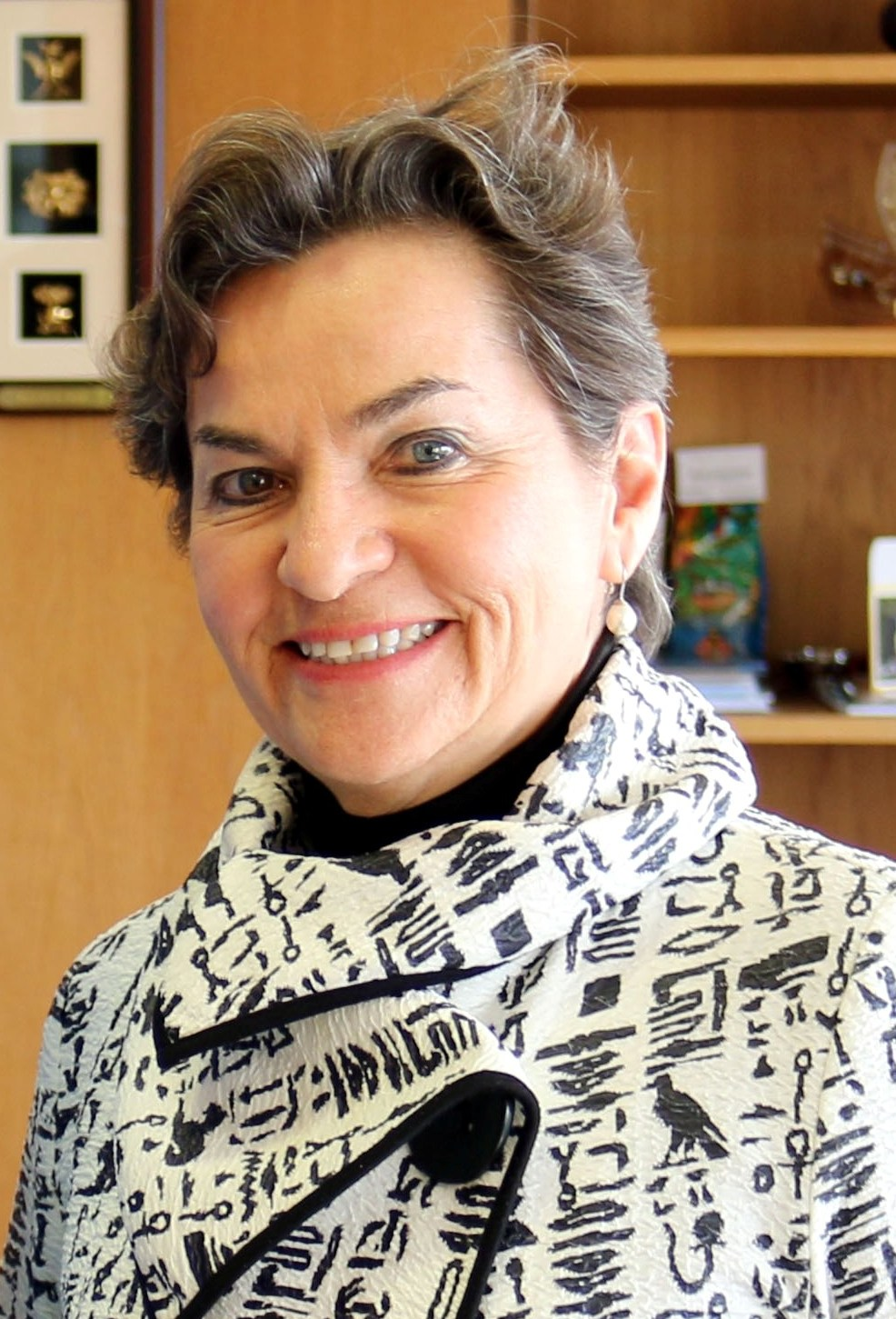
Christiana Figueres appointed Executive Secretary of the UN Framework Convention on Climate Change

The top 25 U.S. communities with the highest populations of Costa Ricans (Source: Census 2010):

1. New York, NY - 6,673
2. Los Angeles, CA - 3,182
3. Trenton, NJ - 1,279
4. Paterson, NJ - 1,241
5. Bound Brook, NJ - 1,229
6. Miami, FL - 1,197
7. Norwalk, CT - 1,024
8. Summit, NJ - 990
9. Houston, TX - 923
10. Philadelphia, PA - 903
11. San Diego, CA - 723
12. Chicago, IL - 681
13. Charlotte, NC - 673
14. Elizabeth, NJ - 660
15. Boston, MA - 652
16. Somerville, NJ - 627
17. Manville, NJ - 576
18. Jacksonville, FL - 542
19. San Francisco, CA - 487
20. Bridgeport, CT - 478
21. Hialeah, FL - 476
22. Long Beach, CA - 467
23. Dallas, TX - 462
24. Newark, NJ - 444
25. Lincolnton, NC - 431

=== U.S. communities with high percentages of people of Costa Rican ancestry ===
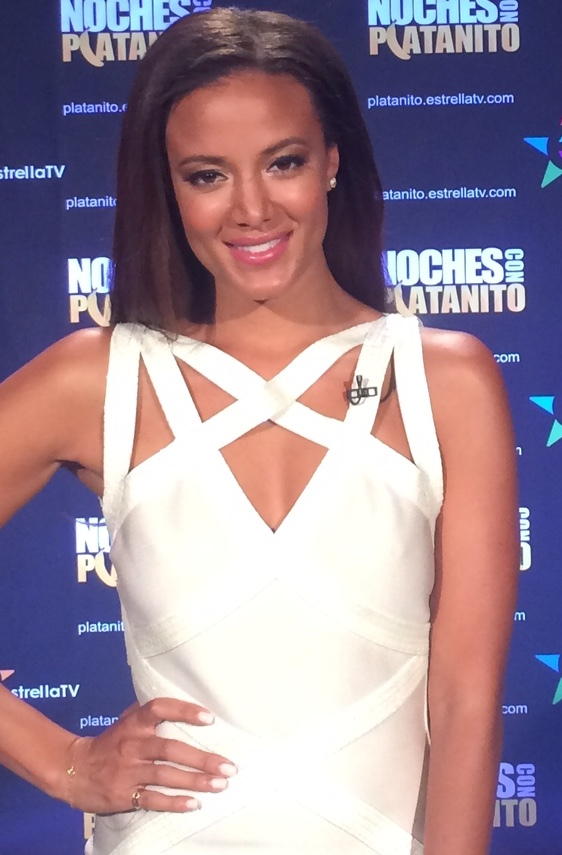
Heather Hemmens is an American actress, film director and film producer.

The top 25 U.S. communities with the highest percentages of Costa Ricans as a percent of total population (Source: Census 2010):

1. Bound Brook, NJ - 11.82%
2. Finderne, NJ - 6.43%
3. Manville, NJ - 5.57%
4. Somerville, NJ - 5.18%
5. Summit, NJ - 4.61%
6. Raritan, NJ - 4.16%
7. Lincolnton, NC - 4.11%
8. South Bound Brook, NJ - 3.09%
9. Hampton Bays, NY - 2.98%
10. Victory Gardens, NJ - 2.50%
11. Clinton, NJ - 2.21%
12. Delaware, NJ - 2.00%
13. Belle Mead, NJ - 1.85%
14. New Providence, NJ - 1.79%
15. Dover, NJ - 1.73%
16. Tuckahoe (Suffolk County), NY - 1.68%
17. Prospect Park, NJ - 1.60%
18. Flemington, NJ - 1.53%
19. Trenton, NJ - 1.51%
20. Maiden, NC - 1.39%
21. Weston, NJ - 1.21%
22. Westwood, NJ - 1.21%
23. Norwalk, CT - 1.20%
24. Bridgehampton, NY - 1.20%
25. Lake Como, NJ - 1.19%

== Notable people ==
- Akinyele - rapper
- Ralph Alvarado - physician and politician
- Govind Armstrong - chef who specializes in California cuisine
- Jean Brooks - actress
- Danny Burstein - actor of theater, film and television
- Charlie Bushnell, actor
- Devin Star Tailes - singer and model
- J. P. Calderon - volleyball player, model and reality show personality
- Ringo Cantillo - soccer player
- Franklin Chang Diaz - NASA astronaut
- Sonia Chang-Díaz - politician
- Ricardo Delgado - film and comic book artist
- Christiana Figueres - head of the Paris negotiations on environmental issues
- Ricky Garbanzo - soccer player
- Heather Hemmens - actress, film director and producer; born to a Costa Rican mother
- Tomas Hilliard-Arce - professional soccer player
- Eliot A. Jardines - intelligence officer
- Arturo Kinch - Olympic skier
- S. J. Main Muñoz - director, writer, producer
- Joseph Marquez - Smash Bros world champion
- Rosa Mendes - professional wrestler
- Candice Michelle - professional wrestler, model, actress
- Deroy Murdock - political commentator and editor
- J. Paul Raines - CEO of Gamestop
- Steven Sainz - Georgia state representative
- Alexander Salazar - prelate
- Harry Shum Jr. - dancer, actor
- Madeleine Stowe - actress
- Samuel I. Stupp - chemist

== See also ==
- Americans in Costa Rica
- Costa Ricans
- Costa Rica–United States relations
