= Quiros (disambiguation) =

Quiros or Quirós may refer to:

== People ==
- Adolfo Quirós (1853–1910), Chilean poet and public servant
- Álvaro Quirós (born 1983), Spanish professional golfer.
- Bernaldo de Quirós (1675–1710), Spanish writer
- Carlos S. Quirós (1932–2022), Puerto Rican politician
- Daniel Oduber Quirós (1921–1991) Costa Rican politician and president from 1974 to 1978
- Edgar Quirós, Spanish paralympic swimmer
- Heriberto Quirós (born 1972), Costa Rican football (soccer) player
- Ignacio Quirós (1931–1999), Argentine actor
- Juan Bautista Quirós Segura (1853–1934), Costa Rican military officer and politician
- Pedro Fernández de Quirós (1565–1614), Portuguese navigator in the service of Spain.
- Pedro Quirós Jiménez (1819–1883), Costa Rican military officer and politician
- Tomás Bernaldo de Quirós, sailor who served as governor of Florida between 1578 and 1579. He was also acting governor of Santa Elena between, at least, 1577 and November 1580.

== Other ==
- Quirós, municipality in Asturias, Spain
- Daniel Oduber Quirós International Airport in Guanacaste, Costa Rica
- Quirós, Catamarca, village and municipality in Catamarca Province, in Argentina
- USS Quiros (PG-40), a United States Navy gunboat in commission from 1900 to 1904, from 1904 to 1908, and from 1910 to 1923 which previously served in the Spanish Navy from 1896 to 1898 as Quirós
