= Ana Elena Pinto =

Costa Rican diplomat

Minister of Foreign Affairs
- Incumbent
- Assumed office 15 October 2026
- President: Laura Fernández
- Preceded by: Manuel Tovar

Personal details
- Born: Ana Elena Pinto Lizano

Ana Elena Pinto Lizano (Note: In this name that follows Hispanic American naming customs, the first or paternal surname is Pinto and the second or maternal family name is Lizano.) is a Costa Rican career diplomat, serving since 15 October 2026 as minister of foreign affairs and worship. Her appointment was announced by President Laura Fernández on 5 October 2026 to replace Manuel Tovar.

Pinto Lizano is an expert in international relations. She holds a master's degree in international management and negotiations and has studied at the Centre d'Etudes Diplomatiques et Stratégiques (CEDS) in Paris. She joined her country's diplomatic service in 2002 and her previous positions have included ambassador to France and Monaco, permanent representative to UNESCO and representative to the Organisation internationale de la Francophonie (OIF).
