= Brazil–Costa Rica relations =

- Brazil: Costa Rica

Bilateral relations between Brazil and Costa Rica commenced in 1907, when the first Brazilian diplomats were officially accredited by the Costa Rican government. Costa Rica has an embassy in Brasília, and Brazil has an embassy in San José. Also, Costa Rica has consulates in Curitiba, Florianópolis, Rio de Janeiro and São Paulo. Both countries are members of Organization of American States.

== State visits ==
Since the establishment of diplomatic links, four Costa Rican Presidents have visited Brazil (José Figueres (1974), José María Figueres (1997), Miguel Ángel Rodríguez (1999) and Óscar Arias (2008)), and two Brazilian Presidents have visited Costa Rica (Fernando Henrique Cardoso (2000) and Luiz Inácio Lula da Silva (2009).

== See also ==
- Foreign relations of Brazil
- Foreign relations of Costa Rica
