= Costa Rica–Russia relations =

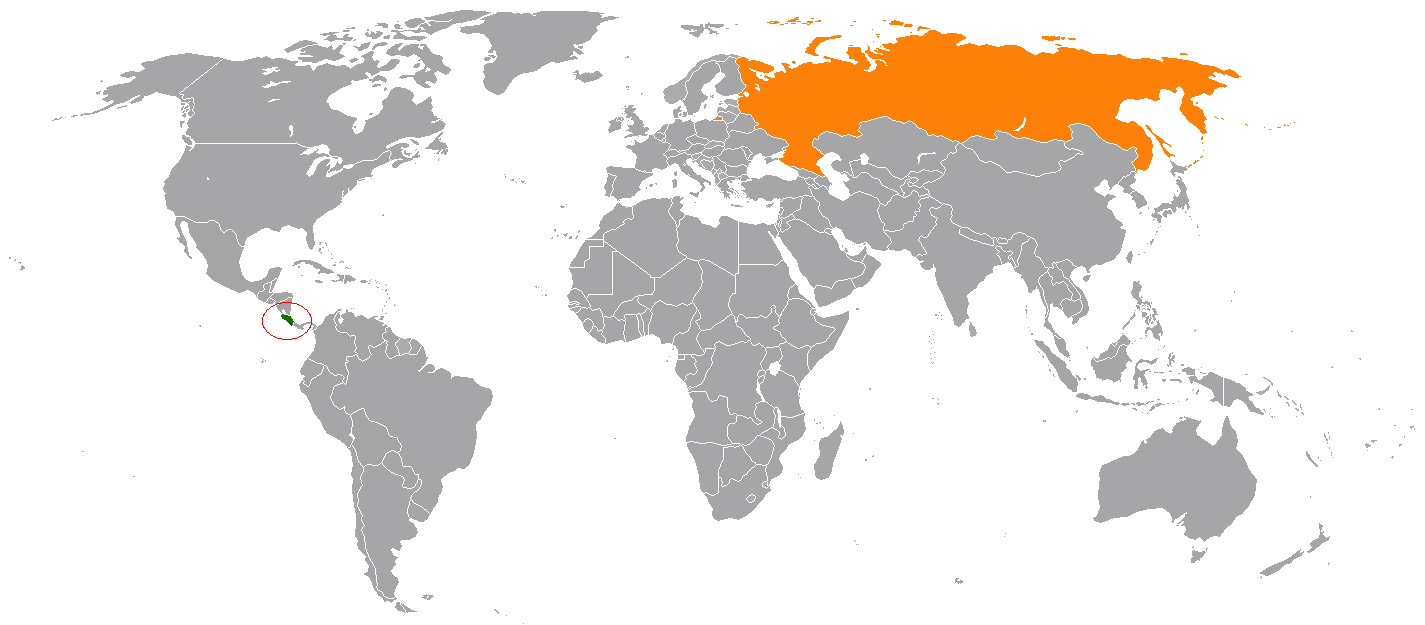

- Costa Rica: Russia

The bilateral relations between Costa Rica and Russia date back to 1872, when Costa Rican president Tomás Guardia and Emperor of Russia Alexander II exchanged correspondence. Relations were not formally established until 1944, at the final stages of World War II, when the Russian Empire was already succeeded by the Soviet Union.

Russia has an embassy in San José, while Costa Rica has their embassy in Moscow.

== Present ==
Both countries are members of the United Nations.

In May 2018, both countries signed an agreement that allowed citizens of both countries visit each other without the need of a visa, staying for up to ninety days.

Recent years saw relations deteriorating, as Costa Rica condemned Russia's invasion of Ukraine in 2022. In March 2023, the International Court of Justice issued arrest warrants for Vladimir Putin and Maria Lvova-Belova for child abductions in the Russo-Ukrainian War. In response, the Russian Ministry of Internal Affairs targeted numerous judges involved in issuing the arrest warrant against Putin by including them on Russia's wanted list; one of those judges being Costa Rican-born Sergio Ugalde. The Legislative Assembly of Costa Rica condemned the "persecution" against Ugalde, and urged the national government to take all possible measures to safeguard the judge's physical integrity.

== See also ==
- Foreign relations of Costa Rica
- Foreign relations of Russia
- List of ambassadors of Russia to Costa Rica
