= Costa Rica–Turkey relations =

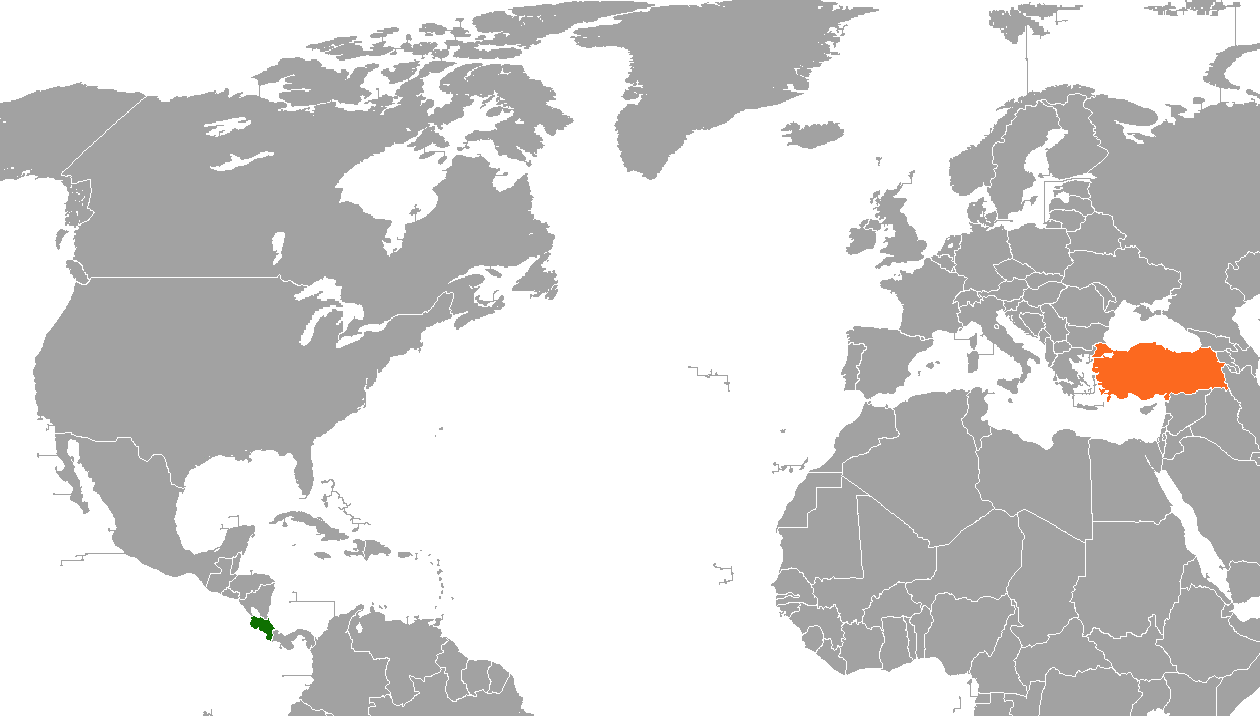

- Costa Rica: Turkey

Costa Rica–Turkey relations are foreign relations between Costa Rica and Turkey. Costa Rica has an embassy in Ankara. Turkey has an embassy in San José.

== High level visits ==
| Guest | Host | Place of visit | Date of visit |
|---|---|---|---|
| (Costa Rica) President Óscar Arias | (Turkey) President Abdullah Gül | Çankaya Köşkü, Ankara | November 2009 |
| (Costa Rica) Minister of Foreign Affairs Enrique Castillo Barrantes | (Turkey) Minister of Foreign Affairs Ahmet Davutoğlu | Çankaya Köşkü, Ankara | 2012 |
| (Costa Rica) Minister of Foreign Affairs Enrique Castillo Barrantes | (Turkey) Minister of Foreign Affairs Ahmet Davutoğlu | Çankaya Köşkü, Ankara | 2013 |
| (Costa Rica) Minister of Foreign Affairs Manuel Gonzalez Sanz | (Turkey) Minister of Foreign Affairs Mevlüt Çavuşoğlu | Çankaya Köşkü, Ankara | October 2014 |
| (Costa Rica) Minister of Foreign Affairs Manuel Gonzalez Sanz | (Turkey) Minister of Foreign Affairs Mevlüt Çavuşoğlu | Second Turkey-SICA Foreign Ministers Forum, Istanbul | April 20, 2017 |

== Economic relations ==
Trade volume between the two countries was US$100 million in 2019 (Turkish exports/imports: US$58.9/41.8 million).

== See also ==
- Foreign relations of Costa Rica
- Foreign relations of Turkey
