= Costa Rica–India relations =

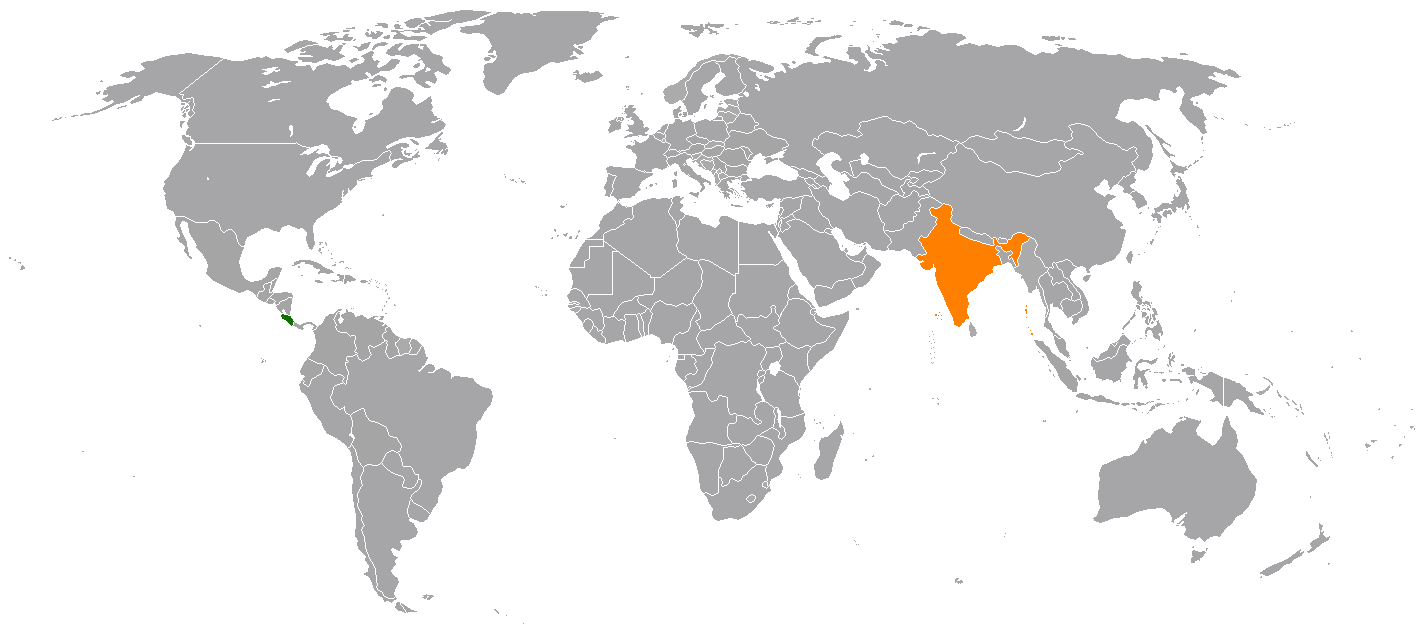

- Costa Rica: India

Costa Rica–India relations refers to the international relations that exist between Costa Rica and India. Costa Rica has an embassy in New Delhi whilst India has a non resident ambassador in Panama. As of 2026, Costa Rica’s Ambassador to India is H.E. Nestor Gabriel Baltodano Vargas.

== History ==
Costa Rica supported India's position in the Kashmir dispute at the United Nations in 1993 and 1994. It also voted against Pakistan's draft resolution on Kashmir at the UNCHR in Geneva in 1994.

India appointed an honorary consul in San José in 1995, and Costa Rica opened an honorary consulate in New Delhi in 1996. Costa Rica dismissed its honorary consuls in Bombay and Calcutta, with the intention of opening its embassy in India in 1990. However, plans to open the embassy were delayed. Costa Rica announced its intention to open an embassy in 2007. The embassy in New Delhi was finally opened on 20 April 2010. It was served by a Charge d’ Affaires from June 2010 until the first ambassador of Costa Rica to India was appointed in June 2011. The Indian Embassy in Panama is jointly accredited to Costa Rica.

The first Foreign Office Consultations between India and Costa Rica were held in August 2012.

== High level visits ==
Costa Rican Vice President Ana Helena Chacón Echeverría visited India in October 2015. Several Costa Rican Foreign Ministers, Ministers for Foreign Trade, and other dignitaries have visited India since 1997. From India, the highest level visits to Costa Rica have been at the level of minister of state. The Minister of State for Commerce & Industry, D. Purandareswari, visited Costa Rica in April 2013 and the Minister of State for External Affairs, General V.K. Singh (Retd), visited Costa Rica in July 2015.

In May 2025, H.E. Nestor Gabriel Baltodano Vargas presented his credentials as Ambassador of the Republic of Costa Rica to India to the President of India, Droupadi Murmu, reinforcing ongoing diplomatic engagement between the two countries. Ambassador Baltodano Vargas has participated in official meetings with Indian counterparts including discussions with the Chief Election Commissioner of India, highlighting continued cooperation and dialogue at high levels of government.

== Agreements ==
The two countries have signed several bilateral agreements including MoUs to hold regular foreign office consultations, and to enhance economic and technical cooperation. Costa Rica and India signed an MoU to set up a Centre for Excellence in Information Technology (CEIT) in Costa Rica in 2009. MoUs were signed between the Foreign Service Institutes of India and Costa Rica, and the FSI and Costa Rican Diplomatic Academy in March 2015.

== Trade ==
Bilateral trade between Costa Rica and India totaled US$196.97 million in 2015. India exported $134.76 million worth of goods to Costa Rica (growing 40.62% over 2014), and imported $62.21 million (declining by 59.94% from 2014). India's imports from Costa Rica witnessed a steady rise up to 2013, but dropped considerably following the closure of an Intel chip factory in San José in 2014. Indian imports of integrated circuits from Costa Rica dropped by 55% in 2014.

The main commodities exported by India to Costa Rica are automobiles, pharmaceutical products, textiles and clothing, motorcycles, organic chemicals, electrical machinery, and miscellaneous products such as notebooks, cables, and tyres. The major commodities imported by India from Costa Rica are wood and articles of wood, integrated circuits and micro assemblies, optical medical or surgical instruments, and to a lesser extent, nuts, coffee, tea, glass, and glassware.

Indian IT firms Infosys, Cognizant, and CSS Corp set up delivery centers in San José in 2013. Companies utilize Costa Rica to serve the U.S. market at a lower cost. Movate Formerly CSS Corp CEO Sunil Mittal estimated that serving the U.S. market from Costa Rica resulted in savings of about 15-20%. Apart from close proximity, Costa Rica also has the advantage of sharing the same time zone as the U.S. TCS and Wipro also have operations in San José.

== Cultural relations ==
Professor Hilda Chen Apuy visited India on a UNESCO scholarship in the 1950s, and later introduced studies on Indian History, Philosophy and Sanskrit at the University of Costa Rica in San José. Hilda also published several articles on India. The Spanish version of Gandhi's autobiography was launched in Costa Rica in September 2008 by President Óscar Arias, who also wrote the prologue to the book.

The 2017 Costa Rican film Enredados: La Confusión (Entangled: The confusion) was directed by Bollywood film director Ashish R Mohan. The film is the first Latin American film to include a typical Bollywood song-and-dance that was choreographed by Bollywood choreographers. The film also stars Indian actor Prabhakar Sharan who became the first Indian to star in a Latin American film.

== Foreign aid ==
India provided Costa Rica with photovoltaic equipment worth ₹1.85 million (US$22,000) in 1997 to establish a solar energy research laboratory at the University of Heredia under the ITEC programme. India donated a telephone exchange to Costa Rican telecom operator ICE in 1998, and provided US$25,000 to help rehabilitate flood victims in 1996. The country donated 18 Bajaj 3-wheelers to the San José Police in December 2005, and donated $100,000 for relief and rehabilitation in the aftermath of Hurricane Tomas in November 2010.

The governments of Costa Rica and India signed an MoU to establish a Centre for Excellence in Information Technology (Centro de Excelencia en Tecnologías de la Información y Comunicación – CETI) in Costa Rica in September 2009. The Government of India contracted C-DAC and APTECH to set up the Centre in March 2015. The Centre, located on the campus of the Universidad Técnica Nacional (UTA) in Alajuela, was inaugurated in March 2016.

Under a cooperation programme between the Costa Rican Ministry of Foreign Trade, Costa Rican Coalition for Development Initiatives and Infosys, 70 Costa Rican students and teachers underwent a three-month training program at Infosys in Mysore in 2014. In March 2017, the Government of India awarded scholarships to 4 Costa Rican women from the indigenous Gnöbe and Bugle ethnic groups for the Barefoot College Institute's Solar Lighting program in Ajmer, Rajasthan. The women will learn to how to develop a project to build, set up and maintain solar panels so that they can bring electricity to their community Punta Burica, Costa Rica’s southernmost point.

Citizens of Costa Rica are eligible for scholarships under the Indian Technical and Economic Cooperation Programme and the Indian Council for Cultural Relations.

== Indians in Costa Rica ==
As of December 2016, there are about 250 Indians in Costa Rica, the majority of whom are involved in the IT industry. Some are also businessmen, engaged in exports of wood, or work in NGOs and the Missionaries of Charity. There are at least ten Indian owned restaurants in Costa Rica, including Indian restaurants "Taj Mahal" and "Naans & Curries" owned by Kapil Gulati who is originally from Gurgaon. Restaurant "Naans & Curries" received "Annapurna" award 2023 by ICCR (Indian Council of Cultural Relations), Government of India. The Costa Rica Indian Association (CRIA), established in 2010, is involved in organising social and cultural programmes, as well as trade promotion activities.

== See also ==
- Foreign relations of Costa Rica
- Foreign relations of India
