= Arnoldo André Tinoco =

Costa Rican diplomat and politician

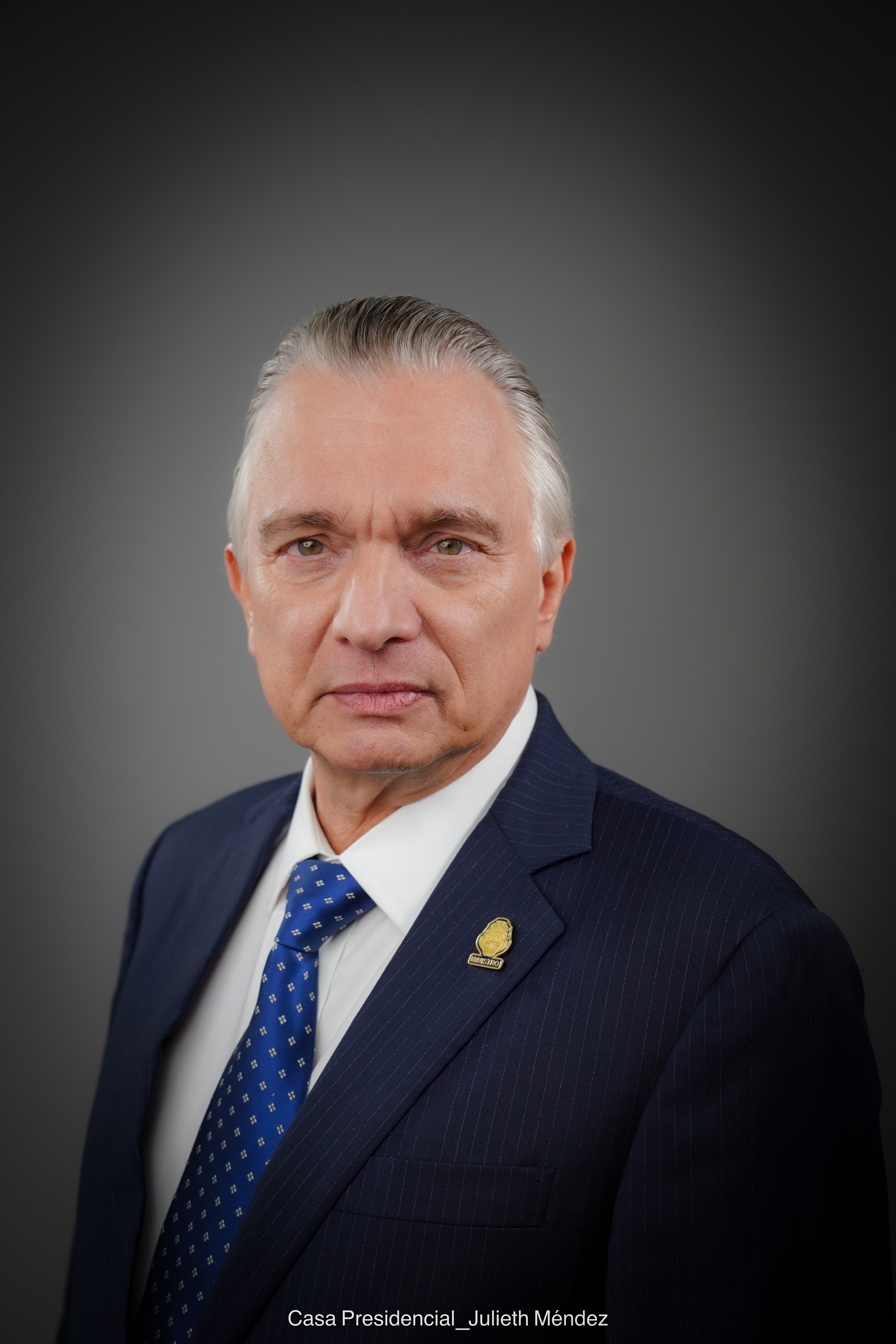

Minister of Foreign Affairs
- In office 8 May 2022 – 8 May 2026
- President: Rodrigo Chaves
- Preceded by: Rodolfo Solano
- Succeeded by: Manuel Tovar Rivera

Personal details
- Education: University of Costa Rica (AB, MA); University of Hamburg (PhD)
- Occupation: Lawyer, diplomat, academic
- Known for: Former President of the Costa Rican Chamber of Commerce (2010–2013); International Arbitrator for the Free Trade Agreement between Costa Rica and Chile (2007); Professor of International Law, University of Costa Rica (1984–1994)

Arnoldo André Tinoco (born 10 January 1961) is a Costa Rican politician. He has been the Minister of Foreign Affairs and Worship since 8 May 2022 to 8 May 2026.
