= Costa Rica–Uruguay relations =

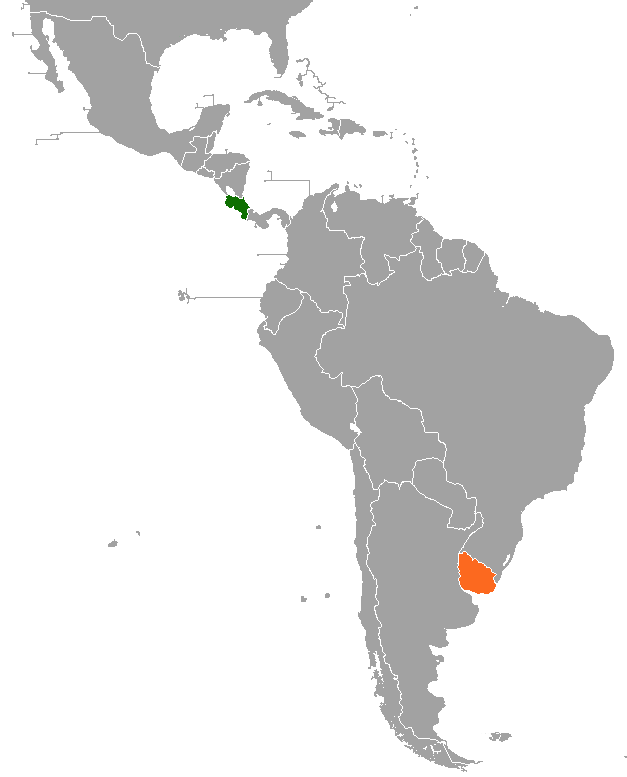

- Costa Rica: Uruguay

Costa Rica–Uruguay relations refers to the diplomatic relations between Costa Rica and Uruguay. Both nations are members of the Community of Latin American and Caribbean States, Group of 77, Organization of American States, Organization of Ibero-American States and the United Nations.

== History ==
Both Costa Rica and Uruguay share a common history in the fact that both nations were once part of the Spanish Empire. During the Spanish colonial period, Costa Rica was governed from the Viceroyalty of New Spain in Mexico City while Uruguay was then part of the Viceroyalty of the Río de la Plata and administered from Buenos Aires. In 1828, Uruguay obtained its independence after the Cisplatine War. In 1841, Costa Rica obtained its independence after the dissolution of the Federal Republic of Central America. In 1907 both nations established diplomatic relations.

Bilateral relations between both nations have taken place primarily in multilateral forums. In January 2015, Uruguayan President José Mujica paid a visit to San José, Costa Rica to attend a summit of the Community of Latin American and Caribbean States. In November 2019 Costa Rican President Carlos Alvarado Quesada paid a visit to Uruguay and met with President Tabaré Vázquez.

== Bilateral agreements ==
Both nations have signed several agreements such as a Trade Agreement (1956); Agreement in Scientific and Cultural Cooperation (1971); Agreement of Cooperation between both nations Ministry's of Foreign Affairs (1992); Agreement in Tourism Cooperation (1997); Agreement on Scientific, Technological and Innovation Cooperation (1998); Memorandum of Understanding for the Establishment of Political Consultations (2002); and a Memorandum of Understanding Regarding Small and Medium Enterprises (2002).

== Resident diplomatic missions ==
- Costa Rica has an embassy in Montevideo.
- Uruguay has an embassy in San José.

== See also ==
- Foreign relations of Costa Rica
- Foreign relations of Uruguay
