= Costa Rica–Italy relations =

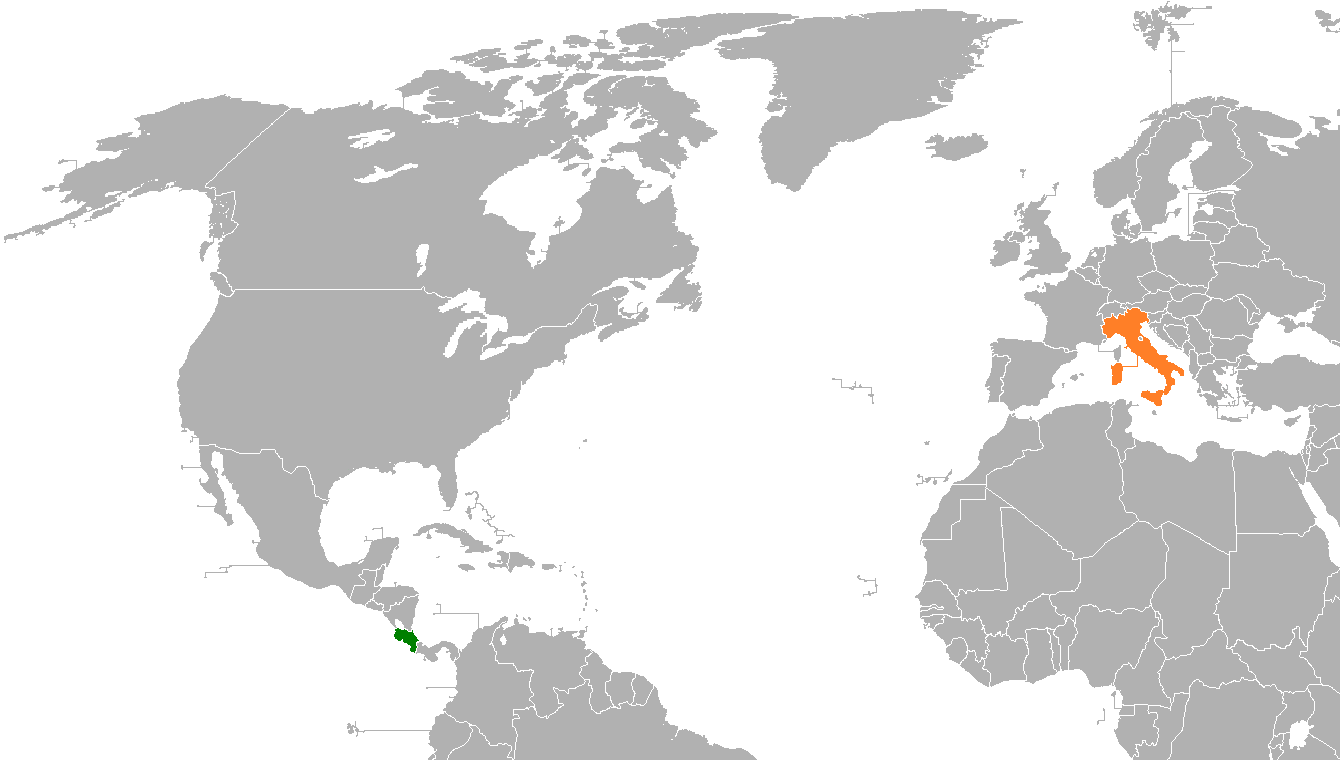

- Costa Rica: Italy

Diplomatic mission
- Embassy of Costa Rica, Rome: Embassy of Italy, San José

Relations between the Republic of Costa Rica and the Italian peninsula exist since 1849. Both Costa Rica and the Italian Republic are members of the OECD and the United Nations.

== History ==
In 1502, as part of his fourth and last voyage, Genoese-born Christopher Columbus landed on what is now the Eastern coast of Costa Rica.

The first contacts between Costa Rica and the Italian states began in 1849 with the recognition of Costa Rica by Ferdinand II from the Kingdom of the Two Sicilies. During the mid-nineteenth century, as Costa Rica and the Italian peninsula were facing internal conflicts, the figures of Giuseppe Garibaldi and Giovanni Battista Culiolo, nicknamed "Leggero", took prominence. According to former Italian ambassador to Costa Rica, Diego Ungaro, Garibaldi visited Leggero in Puntarenas, as the latter was helping the Costa Rican army during the Second Battle of Rivas. In 1861, Costa Rica recognized the Proclamation of the Kingdom of Italy by the Kingdom of Sardinia, and two years later, both Costa Rica and the Kingdom of Italy signed a treaty of friendship.

Relations between both countries became strained during World War II. On 8 December 1941, one day after the attack on Pearl Harbor, Costa Rica declared war against Japan, and against Germany and Italy three days later. As a result, the Costa Rican government, led by Rafael Ángel Calderón Guardia, persecuted citizens from the Axis powers who were living in Costa Rica, as well as their descendants. In 1944, during the later stages of the war, Costa Rican doctor Carlos Luis Collado Martínez, who had studied in the University of Bologna, was killed in Casalecchio di Reno by the Panzergrenadier Division Großdeutschland during the Italian resistance movement.

After the war, both countries reestablished their relations in 1948.

== Resident diplomatic missions ==
- Italy has an embassy in San José and an honorary consulate in Tamarindo.
- Costa Rica has an embassy in Rome and honorary consulates in Bari, Florence, Milan, and Turin.

== See also ==
- Italian Costa Ricans
