= Foreign relations of Costa Rica =

Costa Rica is currently an active member of the international community and, in 1983, claimed it was for neutrality. Due to certain powerful constituencies favoring its methods, it has a weight in world affairs far beyond its size. The country lobbied aggressively for the establishment of the Office of the United Nations High Commissioner for Human Rights, and became the first nation to recognize the jurisdiction of the Inter-American Human Rights Court, based in San José.

The foreign affairs of the Republic of Costa Rica are a function of the Ministry of Foreign Affairs and Worship.

== History ==
Costa Rica gained election as president of the Group of 77 in the United Nations in 1995. That term ended in 1997 with the South-South Conference held in San Jose the 3rd.

Costa Rica occupied a nonpermanent seat in the Security Council from 1997 to 1999 and exercised a leadership role in confronting crises in the Middle East and Africa, as well as in the former Socialist Federal Republic of Yugoslavia. It is currently a member of the United Nations Commission on Human Rights. On 1 January 2008 Costa Rica started its third year term on the Security Council.

Costa Rica strongly backed efforts by the United States to implement UN Security Council Resolution 940, which led to the restoration of the democratically elected Government of Haiti in October 1994. Costa Rica was among the first to call for a postponement of the 22 May elections in Peru when international observer missions found electoral machinery not prepared for the vote count.

Costa Rica is also a member of the International Criminal Court, without a Bilateral Immunity Agreement of protection for the US-military (as covered under Article 98).

== Relations to Central America ==
In 1987, then President Óscar Arias authored a regional plan that served as the basis for the Esquipulas Peace Agreement and Arias was awarded the 1987 Nobel Peace Prize for his work. Arias also promoted change in the USSR-backed Nicaraguan government of the era. Costa Rica also hosted several rounds of negotiations between the Salvadoran Government and the Farabundo Martí National Liberation Front, aiding El Salvador's efforts to emerge from civil war and culminating in that country's 1994 free and fair elections. Costa Rica has been a strong proponent of regional arms-limitation agreements. Former President Miguel Ángel Rodríguez recently proposed the abolition of all Central American militaries and the creation of a regional counternarcotics police force in their stead.

With the establishment of democratically elected governments in all Central American nations by the 1990s, Costa Rica turned its focus from regional conflicts to the pursuit of neoliberal policies on the isthmus. The influence of these policies, along with the US invasion of Panama, was instrumental in drawing Panama into the Central American model of neoliberalism. Costa Rica also participated in the multinational Partnership for Democracy and Development in Central America.

Regional political integration has not proven attractive to Costa Rica. The country debated its role in the Central American integration process under former President Calderon. Costa Rica has sought concrete economic ties with its Central American neighbors rather than the establishment of regional political institutions, and it chose not to join the Central American Parliament.

== Costa Rica in the UN ==
Costa Rica has been an active member of the United Nations since its inception at the San Francisco Conference in 1945. Its first ambassador to the United Nations was Fernando Soto Harrison, the secretary of governance under President Picado.

Costa Rican Christiana Figueres was nominated for the post of UN secretary-general in July 2016.

== Diplomatic relations ==
List of countries with which Costa Rica maintains diplomatic relations:

#	Country	Date
1	Honduras	1 July 1839
2	Guatemala	18 August 1839
3	El Salvador	10 December 1845
4	United Kingdom	28 February 1848
5	France	12 March 1848
6	Spain	10 May 1850
7	United States	24 March 1851
8	Peru	25 April 1852
9	Netherlands	12 July 1852
10	Colombia	11 June 1856
11	Chile	20 June 1857
12	Belgium	26 July 1858
13	Argentina	23 October 1862
14	Italy	25 February 1864
15	Nicaragua	30 July 1868
16	Mexico	3 August 1876
17	Dominican Republic	10 August 1876
18	Ecuador	26 October 1885
19	Venezuela	22 June 1891
20	Panama	29 December 1903
21	Bolivia	3 January 1907
22	Brazil	21 June 1907
—	Cuba (suspended)	17 December 1907
—	Holy See	19 August 1908
23	Portugal	10 July 1913
24	Uruguay	16 January 1930
25	Poland	18 November 1933
26	Japan	20 February 1935
27	Czech Republic	21 March 1935
28	Sweden	26 November 1937
29	Norway	2 May 1939
30	Russia	8 May 1944
31	Philippines	5 July 1946
32	Denmark	3 October 1947
33	Paraguay	5 January 1948
34	Turkey	20 April 1950
35	Cambodia	1 May 1950
36	Austria	5 February 1952
37	Serbia	14 June 1952
38	Germany	7 October 1952
39	Israel	22 October 1954
40	Haiti	29 September 1955
41	Switzerland	18 June 1957
—	Sovereign Military Order of Malta	8 August 1957
42	Canada	20 January 1961
43	South Korea	15 August 1962
44	Luxembourg	29 January 1963
45	Syria	15 December 1964
46	Egypt	1964
47	Greece	2 July 1965
48	Finland	23 August 1966
49	Hungary	14 May 1970
50	India	15 September 1970
51	Bulgaria	9 October 1970
52	Romania	4 July 1970
53	Trinidad and Tobago	21 May 1971
54	Jamaica	21 July 1971
55	Barbados	6 March 1972
56	Ivory Coast	15 February 1973
57	Albania	20 February 1973
58	Tunisia	15 October 1973
59	Pakistan	9 November 1973
60	Thailand	14 December 1973
—	North Korea (suspended)	10 February 1974
61	Ethiopia	18 March 1974
62	Cameroon	3 April 1974
63	Guyana	17 April 1974
64	Australia	9 October 1974
65	Libya	30 November 1974
66	Bahamas	1974
67	Iran	16 June 1975
68	Nigeria	26 June 1975
69	Vietnam	24 April 1976
70	Myanmar	8 March 1977
71	Malaysia	17 April 1977
72	Mongolia	6 June 1977
73	Sri Lanka	11 June 1977
74	Nepal	16 August 1977
75	Papua New Guinea	28 April 1978
76	Senegal	23 January 1979
77	Suriname	1 March 1979
78	Togo	11 June 1979
79	Iraq	March 1981
80	Equatorial Guinea	April 1981
81	Belize	September 1981
82	Cyprus	17 November 1981
83	Kenya	1982
84	Antigua and Barbuda	16 January 1984
85	Indonesia	9 January 1985
86	Morocco	25 September 1986
87	Singapore	1 September 1987
88	New Zealand	5 July 1988
89	Algeria	13 March 1990
90	Saint Lucia	1991
91	Seychelles	17 March 1992
92	Lithuania	17 May 1992
93	Ukraine	9 June 1992
94	Saint Kitts and Nevis	11 June 1992
95	Marshall Islands	15 June 1992
96	Belarus	24 June 1992
97	Saint Vincent and the Grenadines	June 1992
98	Grenada	31 August 1992
99	Slovakia	6 January 1993
100	Estonia	4 October 1993
101	Brunei	14 April 1994
102	Benin	28 June 1994
103	South Africa	4 October 1994
104	Guinea-Bissau	28 March 1995
105	Bosnia and Herzegovina	19 October 1995
106	Croatia	19 October 1995
107	Slovenia	19 October 1995
108	Andorra	22 May 1996
109	Cape Verde	23 May 1996
110	Kazakhstan	1 October 1996
111	North Macedonia	15 October 1996
112	Iceland	10 January 1997
113	Azerbaijan	15 January 1997
114	Armenia	8 April 1997
115	Lesotho	17 April 1998
116	Georgia	5 May 1998
117	Gambia	26 October 1999
118	Liechtenstein	12 January 2000
119	Moldova	4 May 2000
120	Ghana	11 July 2000
121	Ireland	15 September 2000
122	Tajikistan	28 February 2001
123	Rwanda	8 March 2001
124	Angola	13 March 2001
125	Mozambique	15 March 2001
126	Dominica	10 May 2001
127	Uzbekistan	7 June 2001
128	Burkina Faso	22 June 2001
129	Kyrgyzstan	24 September 2001
130	Timor-Leste	14 May 2003
131	Latvia	15 May 2003
132	Qatar	17 March 2004
133	Bahrain	22 September 2006
134	Kuwait	22 September 2006
135	Jordan	10 January 2007
136	Montenegro	24 May 2007
137	China	1 June 2007
138	Lebanon	24 August 2007
139	Uganda	29 August 2007
140	Yemen	4 September 2007
141	Republic of Congo	4 September 2007
142	Botswana	11 September 2007
143	Eswatini	24 September 2007
144	Burundi	28 September 2007
145	Guinea	1 October 2007
146	Oman	19 December 2007
—	State of Palestine	5 February 2008
147	San Marino	19 February 2008
148	United Arab Emirates	11 March 2010
149	Maldives	21 September 2010
150	Bhutan	21 March 2012
151	Fiji	2 August 2013
—	Kosovo	23 September 2013
152	Zambia	28 May 2014
153	Namibia	12 December 2014
154	Laos	28 September 2015
155	Monaco	22 October 2015
156	Saudi Arabia	7 December 2015
157	Vanuatu	28 September 2018
158	Bangladesh	Unknown
159	Liberia	Unknown
160	Malta	Unknown

== Bilateral relations ==
Country	Formal Relations Began	Notes
Argentina		See Argentina–Costa Rica relations: Argentina has an embassy in San José.; Costa Rica has an embassy in Buenos Aires.
Azerbaijan	15 January 1997	The diplomatic relations between the Republic of Azerbaijan and the Republic of Costa Rica were established on 15 January 1997.; The Republic of Azerbaijan is accredited to the Republic of Costa Rica through its embassy in Mexico City, Mexico.
Brazil		See Brazil–Costa Rica relations: Brazil has an embassy in San José.; Costa Rica has an embassy in Brasília.
China		See China–Costa Rica relations Costa Rica maintained official relations with the Republic of China (commonly known as Taiwan) instead of the People's Republic of China (commonly known as China) until 1 June 2007, when it opened relations with China. Taiwan then broke relations on 7 June.: China has an embassy in San José.; Costa Rica has an embassy in Beijing.
Cuba (suspended)		See Cuba–Costa Rica relations Soon after Fidel Castro declared Cuba a socialist state, Costa Rican President Mario Echandi Jiménez ended diplomatic relations on 10 September 1961 with the island through Executive Decree Number 2, in compliance with sanctions placed on Cuba by the Organization of American States. In 1995, Costa Rica established a consular office in Havana. Cuba opened a consular office in Costa Rica in 2001. Forty-seven years after the initial freeze, Costa Rican President Óscar Arias Sánchez announced on 18 March 2009 that normal relations were to be re-established, saying, "If we have been able to turn the page with regimes as profoundly different to our reality as occurred with the USSR or, more recently, with the Republic of China, how would we not do it with a country that is geographically and culturally much nearer to Costa Rica?" Arias also announced that both countries would exchange ambassadors. The next day, Cuba's government announced that it agreed to re-establishing relations.: Costa Rica has an closed embassy in Havana.; Cuba has an closed embassy in San José.
India		See Costa Rica–India relations: India has honorary consulate in San José.; Costa Rica maintains an embassy in New Delhi.
Israel		See Costa Rica–Israel relations Costa Rica recognized Israel on 19 June 1948. The Embassy of Costa Rica was located in Tel Aviv until it moved to Jerusalem in 1982. As of 1984, Costa Rica and El Salvador were the only two countries that recognized Israel and also maintained an embassy in Jerusalem. In 2006, the Embassy of Costa Rica relocated to Tel Aviv; Costa Rican President Óscar Arias said the decision was intended to "rectify a historic error". In December 2011, Rodrigo Carreras became the Costa Rican ambassador to Israel for the second time, after his posting there in the 1980s. Carreras' father, Benjamin Nunez, also served as the Costa Rican ambassador to Israel.: Costa Rica has an embassy in Tel Aviv.; Israel has an embassy in San José.
Italy		See Costa Rica–Italy relations: Costa Rica has an embassy in Rome.; Italy has an embassy in San José.
Kosovo	23 September 2013	Costa Rica officially recognised the independence of the Republic of Kosovo on 17 February 2008. Costa Rica and Kosovo established diplomatic relations on 23 September 2013.
Mexico	1838	See Costa Rica–Mexico relations Diplomatic relations between Mexico and Costa Rica began in 1838.: Costa Rica has an embassy in Mexico City.; Mexico has an embassy in San José.
Russia		See Costa Rica–Russia relations
Serbia	1952	Both countries have established diplomatic relations in 1952.; A number of bilateral agreements have been concluded and are in force between both countries.
South Korea	15 August 1962	The establishment of diplomatic relations between the Republic of Korea and the Republic of Costa Rica began on 15 August 1962.: Costa Rica has an embassy in Seoul.; South Korea has an embassy in San José.
Spain	1850	See Costa Rica–Spain relations: Costa Rica has an embassy in Madrid.; Spain has an embassy in San José.
Turkey	15 January 1898	See Costa Rica–Turkey relations: Costa Rica has an embassy in Ankara.; Turkey has an embassy in San José.; Trade volume between the two countries was US$100 million in 2019 (Costa Rican exports/imports: 41.8/58.9 million USD).
United Kingdom	1848	See Costa Rica–United Kingdom relations Costa Rica established diplomatic relations with the United Kingdom on 28 February 1848.: Costa Rica maintains an embassy in London.; The United Kingdom is accredited to Costa Rica from its embassy in San José.; Both countries share common membership of the Atlantic co-operation pact, the International Criminal Court, the OECD, and the World Trade Organization, as well as the Central America–UK Association Agreement. Bilaterally the two countries have an Investment Agreement.
United States		See Costa Rica–United States relations The United States is Costa Rica's most important trading partner. The U.S. accounts for almost half of Costa Rica's exports, imports, and tourism, and more than two-thirds of its foreign investment. The two countries share growing concerns for the environment and want to preserve Costa Rica's important tropical resources and prevent environmental degradation. In 2007, the United States reduced Costa Rica's debt in exchange for protection and conservation of Costa Rican forests through a debt for nature swap under the auspices of the Tropical Forest Conservation Act. This is the largest such agreement of its kind to date.: Costa Rica has an embassy in Washington, D.C. and consulates-general in Atlanta, Chicago, Houston, Los Angeles, Miami, New York and San Juan.; United States has an embassy in San José.
Uruguay		See Costa Rica–Uruguay relations: Costa Rica has an embassy in Montevideo.; Uruguay has an embassy in San José.

== See also ==
- List of diplomatic missions in Costa Rica
- List of diplomatic missions of Costa Rica
- Visa requirements for Costa Rican citizens
