= Costa Rica–United States relations =

- Costa Rica: United States

Diplomatic mission
- Embassy of Costa Rica, Washington, D.C.: Embassy of the United States, San José

Relations between Costa Rica and the United States have been historically close; nevertheless there were instances in history where the US and Costa Rica disagreed. One such example might be the case of Freebooter William Walker. Nevertheless, considering that Costa Rica generally supports the U.S. in international fora, especially in the areas of democracy and human rights, modern day relations are very strong.

According to the 2012 U.S. Global Leadership Report, 41% of Costa Ricans approve of U.S. leadership, while 15% disapprove and 44% are uncertain.

== History ==
=== 19th century ===
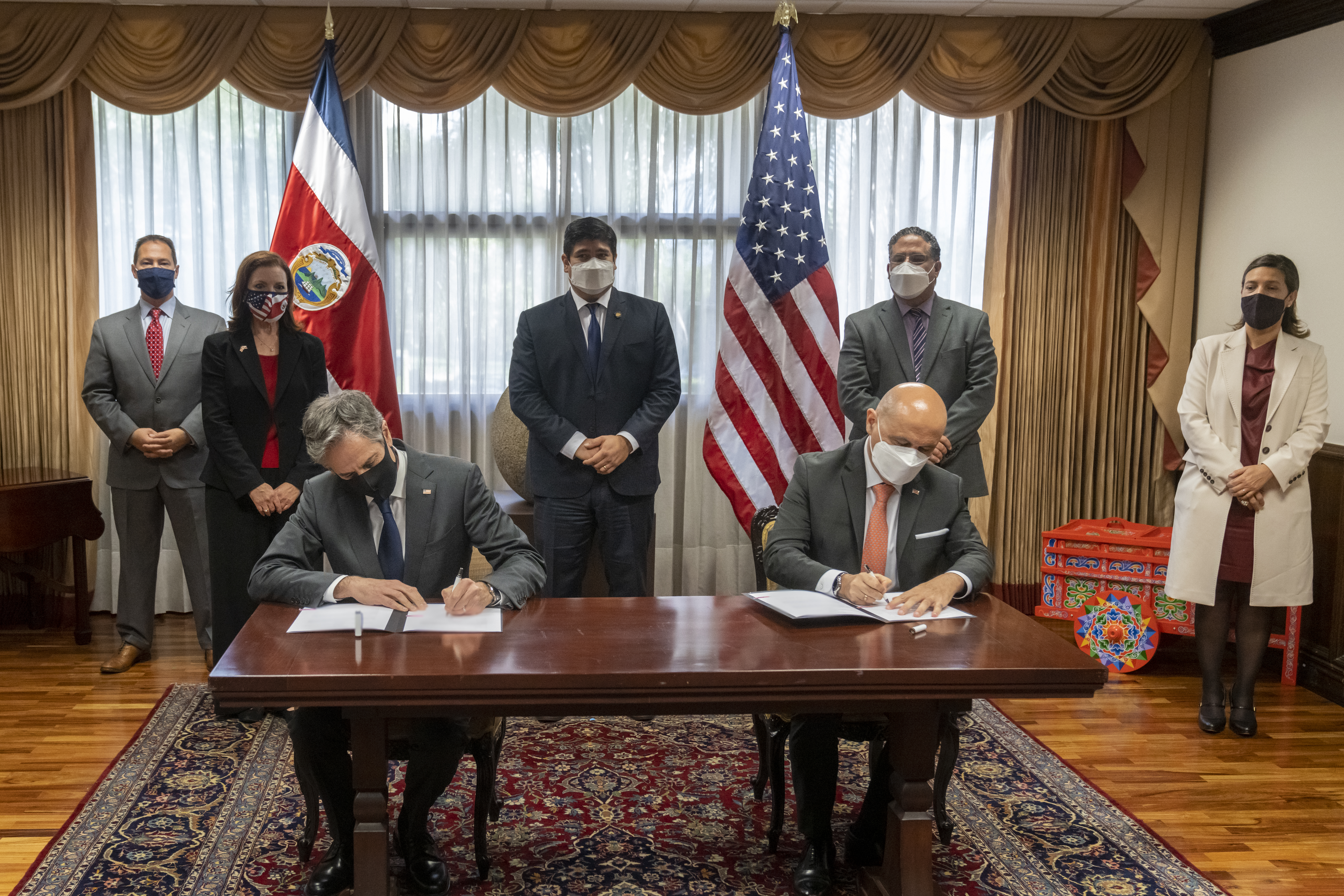
US Secretary of State Antony Blinken and Costa Rican Foreign Minister Rodolfo Solano sign a security partnership in 2021

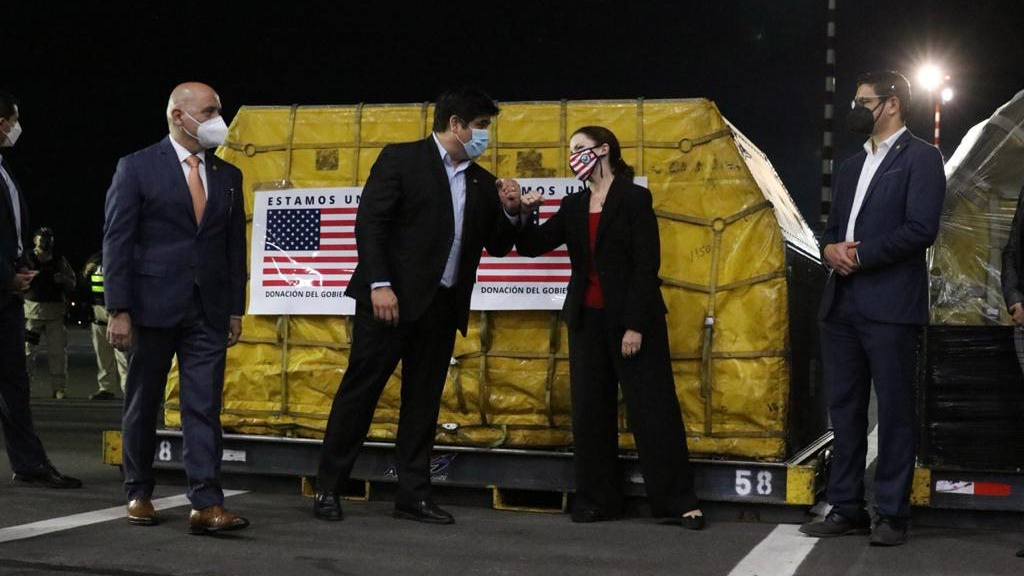
The US delivers Pfizer–BioNTech COVID-19 vaccines to Costa Rica as part of the COVAX initiative in 2021

Costa Rica and the United States have maintained formal diplomatic relations since 1851.

=== 20th century ===
Through provision of more than $100 million in assistance, the U.S. Agency for International Development (USAID) supported Costa Rican efforts to stabilize its economy and broaden and accelerate economic growth through policy reforms and trade liberalization. Assistance initiatives in the 1990s concentrated on democratic policies, modernizing the administration of justice, and sustainable development. Once the country had graduated from most forms of U.S. assistance, the USAID Mission in Costa Rica closed in 1996. However, USAID completed a $9 million project in 2000–01 to support refugees of Hurricane Mitch residing in Costa Rica.

Relations between the two countries took a dip in the 1980s when the Reagan administration used Costa Rican territory to attack the Sandinista government of Costa Rica's northern neighbor Nicaragua against the wishes of the Costa Rican government. The administration of Costa Rican President Oscar Arias prohibited the handful of former U.S. officials from entering Costa Rica after a congressional commission found that their actions to resupply the contra rebels led to drug trafficking by contra pilots. The Bush Administration stopped international financial organization loans to the government of Costa Rica after Arias expropriated land on which a secret mile-long airstrip was built.

More than 3,370 Peace Corps volunteers have served in Costa Rica since the program was established in 1963. Currently, 128 volunteers serve there. Volunteers work in the areas of youth development, community development, business and English education. They are trained and work in Spanish.

=== 21st century ===
==== 2001–2024 ====
The United States is Costa Rica's most important trading partner. The two countries share growing concerns for the environment and want to preserve Costa Rica's tropical resources and prevent environmental degradation. In 2007, the United States reduced Costa Rica's debt in exchange for protection and conservation of Costa Rican forests through a debt for nature swap under the auspices of the Tropical Forest Conservation Act. This is the largest such agreement of its kind to date. This deal between both governments generated 50 million dollars which were devoted to conservation projects.

As reported by the National Census of Costa Rica of 2011, 4.1% more American citizens live in Costa Rica with regard to the number calculated in 2000. There are 15,898 American citizens living in Costa Rica, as found by the census, compared to the 9,511 that lived in that nation in the year 2000.

During the first trimester of 2011, 55% of people that visited Costa Rica came from the United States.

==== Second Trump administration (2025–present) ====
In February 2025, Costa Rica and Panama agreed to accept deported migrants from the USA, including individuals from China, Uzbekistan, Pakistan, and Afghanistan. This decision followed pressure from the Trump administration, which has been deporting thousands of undocumented immigrants, sometimes to third countries instead of their country of origin. Costa Rican President Rodrigo Chaves acknowledged the power imbalance between the nations, while analysts suggest that tariff threats played a role in these agreements. The U.S. is funding the temporary detention of deportees in Costa Rica before their repatriation.

== U.S.-Costa Rica Counter-narcotics Cooperation Agreement ==
In 1999 the U.S.-Costa Rica Counter-narcotics Cooperation Agreement, entered into force. The agreement facilitates cooperation between the Coast Guard of Costa Rica and the U.S. Coast Guard regarding drug trafficking and other illegal activity.

Bilateral Costa Rican law enforcement cooperation, particularly against drug trafficking, has been successful. However, there was an internal dispute (within Costa Rica) regarding the entrance of United States naval forces as support for U.S. Coast Guard activities.

While Costa Rica is concerned about the threat of illegal drug-related activities, it has a tradition of demilitarization and peaceful conflict resolution. Costa Rican Congressman Luis Fishman stated his concern saying that "This gives a blank check to American troops", while opposition legislator Juan Carlos Mendoza added, "The type of armament leads one to believe that these operations are more military in character, rather than for combating drug trafficking".

There was also an online petition against the entry of U.S. naval vessels, which received over 4,200 signatures, and the mobilization of protestors.

== U.S. Embassy in San José, Costa Rica ==
The U.S. Embassy in Costa Rica is in San José. The embassy's office building was built in 1980 and designed by architect Robert Marquis. The current Ambassador is Melinda Hildebrand.

== Centro Cultural Costarricense Norteamericano ==
The Centro Cultural Costarricense Norteamericano is a non-profit Costa Rican association established in 1945 and declared 'public interest' by the Costa Rican government in 1993.

This association's stated mission is "to lead in innovative ways of teaching languages and the promotion of inter-cultural experiences," more precisely with regard to the United States.

It is partnered with the Embassy of the United States in San José.

== Education ==
The American International School of Costa Rica serves American families in Costa Rica.

== Resident diplomatic missions ==
- Costa Rica has an embassy in Washington, D.C. and consulates-general in Atlanta, Houston, Los Angeles, Miami and New York City.
- United States has an embassy in San José.
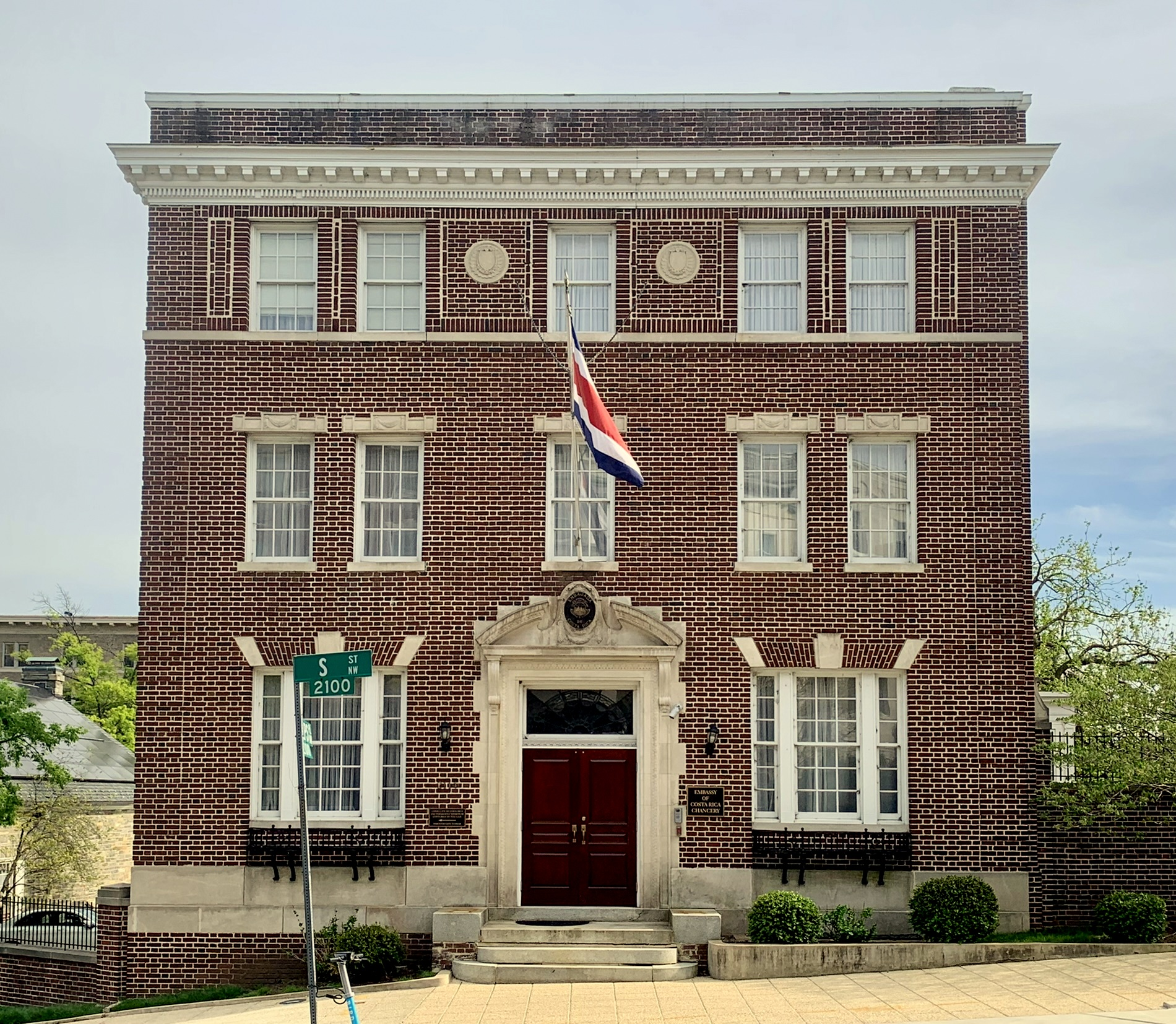
Embassy of Costa Rica in Washington, D.C.

Embassy of the United States in San José

== See also ==
- Costa Rican Americans
- Foreign relations of the United States
- Foreign relations of Costa Rica
