= Quirós, Catamarca =

Coordinates: 28°47′S 65°07′W

Quirós
- Municipality and village
- Interactive map of Quirós
- Country: Argentina
- Province: Catamarca Province
- Time zone: UTC−3 (ART)

Quirós is a village and municipality in Catamarca Province in northwestern Argentina.
