= Canada–Costa Rica relations =

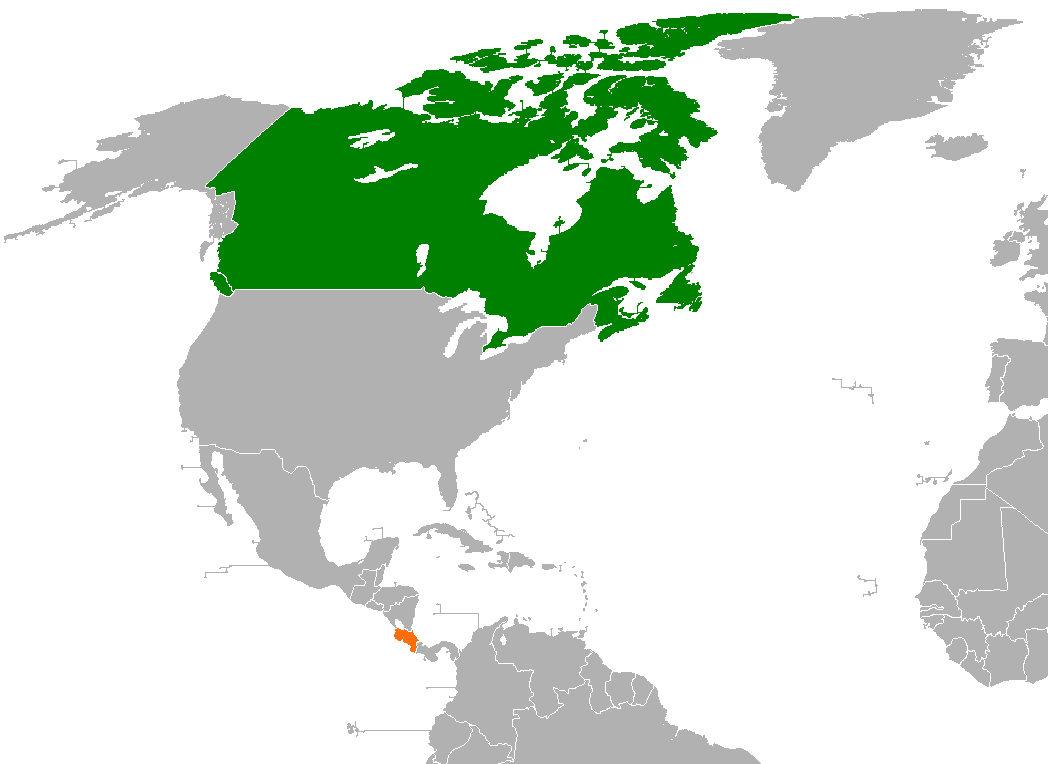

- Canada: Costa Rica

Canada–Costa Rica relations refers to the bilateral relations between the Canada and Costa Rica. Both countries are members of the Organization of American States.

== History ==
Diplomatic relations between Canada and Costa Rica were established on 20 January 1961.

Consular relations between Costa Rica and Canada began in 1920 with the appointment of Víctor Emilio Echeverría Velázquez as Honorary Vice Consul of Costa Rica in Montreal. The first bilateral agreement was the Echandi-Brown trade modus vivendi, signed on November 18, 1950. The first Canadian ambassador to San José was Jean-Louis Delisle, who presented his credentials in June 1961.

Canada and Costa Rica have enjoyed bilateral relations for over 60 years, based on a partnership in development assistance, cooperation on multilateral issues and international initiatives, increased trade and investment through the Canada–Costa Rica Free Trade Agreement, and other ties based on tourism, student exchanges, and immigration.

The governments of Canada and Costa Rica maintain close dialogue on international issues both at the United Nations and in other multilateral forums and regional contexts. Canada strongly supported the Central American peace process led by President Óscar Arias of Costa Rica during his first presidential term in the 1980s, a process that successfully ended the period of conflict in the region. Both countries have also joined forces to promote important initiatives such as the Ottawa Convention on Landmines, the International Criminal Court, and, more recently, the initiative to ban cluster bombs through the Dublin Conference process.

== High-level visits ==
High-level visits from Canada to Costa Rica

- Prime Minister Justin Trudeau (2019, 2022)

== Resident diplomatic missions ==
- Canada has an embassy in San José
- Costa Rica has an embassy in Ottawa.

== See also ==
- Foreign relations of Canada
- Foreign relations of Costa Rica
- Latin American Canadians
