= American International School of Costa Rica =

Private international school in Costa Rica

Location
- Bosques de Doña Rosa; Ciudad Cariari, La Asunción, Heredia; Costa Rica

Information
- School type: Non-profit, Private international school
- Established: 1970
- Status: Open
- Grades: Preschool–Grade 12
- Gender: Coeducational
- Age range: 3–18
- Enrollment: Approximately 250
- Language: English
- Campus type: Suburban
- Nickname: AIS
- Accreditation: Cognia; Ministry of Public Education (Costa Rica)
- Website: ais.ed.cr

American International School of Costa Rica (AIS) is a private, non-profit international school located in Ciudad Cariari, La Asunción District, Belén Canton, Heredia Province, Costa Rica. Founded in 1970, the school provides an English-language education from preschool through Grade 12 based primarily on the American educational system while also meeting the academic requirements established by Costa Rica's Ministry of Public Education (Ministerio de Educación Pública, MEP).

AIS serves both Costa Rican and international families and has historically enrolled students representing dozens of nationalities. The school offers a college-preparatory curriculum intended to prepare graduates for admission to universities in Costa Rica, the United States, and other countries.

The institution is accredited by Cognia and recognized by Costa Rica's Ministry of Public Education.

== History ==
The American International School of Costa Rica was founded in 1970 by a group of parents seeking an English-language educational program based on the American curriculum for children living in Costa Rica.

During its early years, the school primarily served members of the diplomatic community, multinational corporations, and Costa Rican families interested in bilingual and international education. As enrollment expanded, the school developed into a full preschool through Grade 12 institution while maintaining relatively small class sizes and individualized instruction.

Throughout its history, AIS has emphasized academic excellence, English-language immersion, and preparation for higher education. Students completing the secondary program may satisfy both American graduation requirements and those established by the Costa Rican educational system.

In 2023, the school celebrated its fifty-third anniversary. La República described AIS as an institution that has educated generations of students while emphasizing leadership, innovation, bilingual education, and international perspectives.

== Governance ==
AIS operates as a private, non-profit educational institution. Governance is entrusted to a Board of Directors elected from the school's parent association. The board establishes institutional policy, oversees long-term planning, and appoints the Executive Director responsible for the school's daily administration.

The school states that its governance model is intended to ensure community participation while maintaining financial resources for educational programs, campus improvements, and student services.

== Campus ==
The campus is situated in Bosques de Doña Rosa, Ciudad Cariari, in the district of La Asunción, Belén Canton, Heredia Province. The location lies northwest of downtown San José and is within close proximity to Juan Santamaría International Airport and several multinational business parks.

Facilities include age-specific classrooms, science laboratories, computer laboratories, libraries, visual arts studios, music rooms, athletic facilities, outdoor recreation areas, and multipurpose spaces used for school assemblies and performances.

Technology resources are integrated throughout the campus, supporting instruction across all grade levels. The school also maintains dedicated learning environments for early childhood education designed to support developmentally appropriate instruction.

The campus has undergone periodic modernization since its establishment, including improvements to academic facilities, technology infrastructure, and athletic spaces in response to enrollment growth and evolving educational needs.

== Location ==
AIS is located in Ciudad Cariari, one of Costa Rica's principal suburban residential communities. The surrounding area contains residential neighborhoods, commercial services, and offices of multinational companies, contributing to the school's diverse student population composed of Costa Rican and international families.

The school's location provides convenient access for families residing in Heredia, Alajuela, and the Greater Metropolitan Area surrounding San José.

== Student life ==
AIS encourages student participation in academic, athletic, artistic, and service-oriented activities outside the classroom. Extracurricular programs are intended to complement the school's academic curriculum by promoting leadership, teamwork, creativity, and personal responsibility.

The student body represents a diverse international community, with students from Costa Rica and numerous other countries. This multicultural environment is reflected in classroom instruction, school events, and cultural celebrations throughout the academic year.

=== Student organizations ===
Students may participate in a variety of organizations that support leadership development and community involvement. These organizations vary from year to year depending on student interest and faculty sponsorship.

Examples of student organizations include:

- Student Council
- National Honor Society
- Model United Nations (MUN)
- Environmental initiatives
- Robotics and STEM clubs
- Academic competition teams
- Community service organizations

Participation in these activities is intended to encourage collaboration, civic responsibility, and leadership skills.

=== Athletics ===
Athletics form an important component of student life at AIS. The school offers competitive and recreational sports programs designed to promote physical fitness, sportsmanship, teamwork, and healthy lifestyles.

Sports offered may include:

- Basketball
- Volleyball
- Football (soccer)
- Track and field
- Swimming
- Cross country

Athletic teams participate in competitions with other international and private schools in Costa Rica when opportunities are available.

=== Arts ===
Visual and performing arts are integrated throughout the curriculum.

Students may participate in:

- Visual arts
- Choir
- Band
- Drama productions
- Musical performances
- Art exhibitions

These programs provide opportunities for creative expression while supporting the development of communication and collaboration skills.

=== Technology and innovation ===
Technology is incorporated throughout the educational program.

Students regularly use:

- Chromebooks and laptop computers
- Interactive classroom technology
- Digital learning platforms
- Educational software
- Online research databases
- Multimedia presentation tools

Technology instruction emphasizes responsible digital citizenship, online safety, ethical use of information, and effective communication in digital environments.

=== Community service ===
Community engagement forms part of the educational philosophy at AIS.

Students participate in service-learning opportunities that encourage them to address local and global challenges through volunteer work, fundraising initiatives, environmental stewardship, and partnerships with community organizations.

Community service projects are designed to develop empathy, leadership, and civic responsibility while connecting classroom learning with real-world experiences.

=== International perspective ===
As an international school, AIS emphasizes intercultural understanding and global citizenship.

The curriculum encourages students to appreciate diverse cultures, perspectives, and languages while preparing them to participate in an increasingly interconnected world.

International-mindedness is promoted through classroom activities, cultural events, language instruction, and collaborative projects involving students from different backgrounds.

== School traditions ==
Throughout the academic year, AIS organizes events that strengthen the sense of community among students, families, faculty, and alumni.

Traditions include academic recognition ceremonies, athletic competitions, cultural celebrations, fine arts performances, graduation ceremonies, and community service initiatives.

Annual events may vary from year to year but are intended to celebrate student achievement and encourage participation across all grade levels.

== Accreditation ==
AIS is accredited by Cognia, an international accrediting organization for primary and secondary schools. Accreditation involves periodic evaluation of governance, curriculum, teaching practices, student achievement, and institutional effectiveness.

The school is also recognized by Costa Rica's Ministry of Public Education (Ministerio de Educación Pública, MEP), enabling students to satisfy national educational requirements while completing an American-style curriculum.

== Recognition ==
In 2023, the Costa Rican newspaper La República highlighted the school's fifty-third anniversary and described its emphasis on bilingual education, personalized learning, innovation, and leadership development.

The United States Department of State includes AIS among the international schools available to American diplomatic families assigned to Costa Rica.

== Administration ==
The school is administered by an Executive Director together with academic administrators responsible for the Early Childhood, Elementary, Middle School, and High School divisions.

Institutional governance is provided by a Board of Directors elected from the parent association, reflecting the school's non-profit organizational structure.

== See also ==
- Education in Costa Rica
- International school
- List of international schools
- Belén Canton

== Admissions ==
Admission to AIS is open to both Costa Rican and international students, subject to the school's admissions requirements and space availability. The admissions process generally includes submission of academic records, age-appropriate assessments when applicable, interviews, and English-language evaluation where necessary.

The school enrolls students throughout the academic year when vacancies are available and provides transition support for families relocating from other educational systems.

== School community ==
AIS serves families from Costa Rica as well as members of the diplomatic corps, multinational corporations, international organizations, and expatriate communities.

The school has reported representing more than 35 nationalities, reflecting its international mission and diverse student population.

Parents participate actively in school life through volunteer activities, community events, fundraising initiatives, and representation on the Board of Directors.

== Educational philosophy ==
AIS states that its educational philosophy emphasizes personalized learning, academic excellence, integrity, collaboration, and global citizenship.

According to the school, instruction is intended to develop students who are:

- Independent learners
- Critical thinkers
- Effective communicators
- Ethical leaders
- Respectful of cultural diversity
- Prepared for lifelong learning

The school's instructional approach combines academic rigor with opportunities for leadership, creativity, service, and personal development.

== International outlook ==
As an international school, AIS incorporates multicultural perspectives throughout its curriculum.

Students are encouraged to develop intercultural competence through classroom instruction, language learning, collaborative projects, cultural celebrations, and interaction with classmates from a variety of national backgrounds.

The school's educational mission emphasizes preparing graduates to succeed in universities and careers within an increasingly interconnected global society.

== Partnerships ==
AIS maintains accreditation through Cognia and operates under authorization from Costa Rica's Ministry of Public Education.

The school also participates in professional educational organizations and collaborates with universities and educational institutions during the university admissions process.

== School profile ==
According to the school's published profile:

- Established: 1970
- School type: Private, non-profit
- Grades: Preschool–12
- Primary language of instruction: English
- Diplomas awarded:
  - United States High School Diploma
  - Costa Rican Secondary Diploma
- Student population: Approximately 250
- Nationalities represented: More than 35
- Accreditation: Cognia
- Recognition: Ministry of Public Education (Costa Rica)

== See also ==
- Education in Costa Rica
- International school
- Belén Canton
- Cognia
