= Ministry of Foreign Affairs and Worship (Costa Rica) =

Government ministry of Costa Rica

- Ministerio de Relaciones Exteriores y Culto (Spanish)

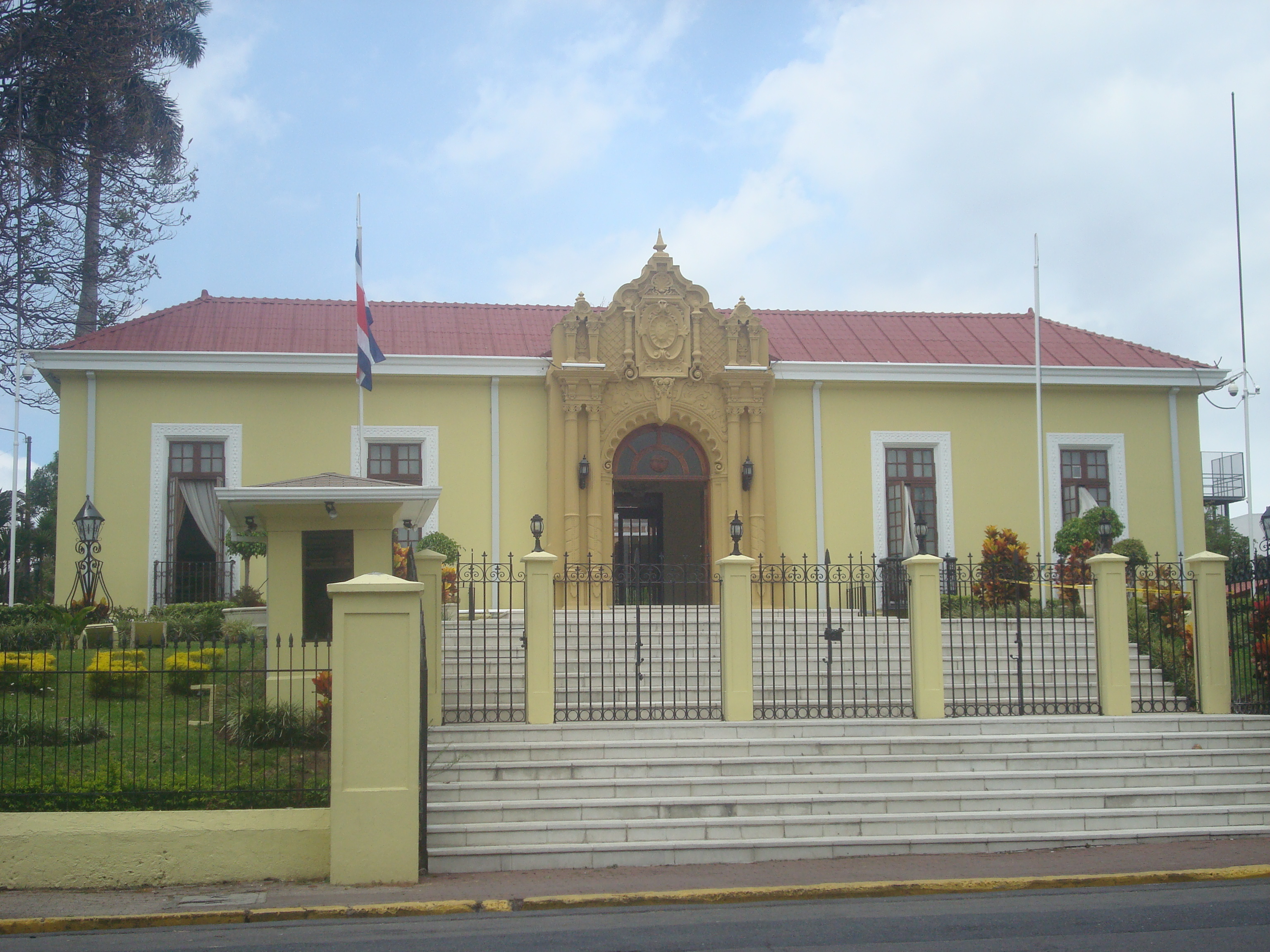
- Yellow House (Casa Amarilla), headquarters of MREC

Agency overview
- Formed: 9 April 1844
- Jurisdiction: Costa Rica and its diplomatic missions
- Headquarters: Casa Amarilla, 9.93649°N 84.07325°W
- Minister responsible: Ana Elena Pinto Lizano, Chancellor (Canciller)
- Website: www.rree.go.cr

The Ministry of Foreign Affairs and Worship (Spanish: Ministerio de Relaciones Exteriores y Culto, MREC) is the ministry in charge of the foreign policy of Costa Rica, including the management of diplomatic missions around the world and their personnel.

Its lead title holder is called the Chancellor (Canciller) of the country, a position currently held since 15 October 2026 by Ana Elena Pinto. There is also a Vice Minister of Bilateral Affairs and International Cooperation and a Vice Minister for Multilateral Affairs.

== History ==
The office was first created on 9 April 1844 as the "Ministry of Government and Police, Internal and Foreign Affairs" with José María Castro Madriz at its helm. On 10 February 1847 it was reorganized as the "Ministry of Internal, Foreign Affairs, Government, Justice and Ecclesiastical Affairs". The then office of Ecclesiastical Affairs was in charge of the foreign affairs related to the Holy See, and today it refers to the "Worship" in the current name of the ministry.

In 1920 the ministry moves to the current location, the Yellow House (Casa Amarilla), a building donated by Andrew Carnegie.

In 1948 it acquired its current name due to the reorganization of the Founding Junta of the Second Republic.

== Functions ==
According to Law No. 3008 of 18 July 1962, the function of the Ministry is to collaborate with the President of the Republic, under the direction of the Minister appointed for this purpose, in the systematized formulation of the country's foreign policy, in the orientation of its international relations and in the safeguarding of national sovereignty. It is the means by which the Republic of Costa Rica carries out all its negotiations with foreign governments and institutions.

The Ministry has, among other objectives:

- Coordinate internal interests, visions and needs and develop a comprehensive and articulated foreign policy.
- Provide advice to the President of the Republic and other institutions of the Executive branch of the government on the conduct of international relations, in order to successfully handle representation and external negotiations at the economic, political, legal and technical assistance levels.
- Guarantee the satisfaction of the fundamental needs of existence, security and prosperity of the Republic of Costa Rica and its nationals.
- Effectively protect the interests of the country and its nationals abroad.
- Promote and represent the interests of the Republic of Costa Rica.
- Promote the country in various instances of the international arena, in order to encourage commercial exchange, and attract investment, tourism and international cooperation.
- Maintain the best image of Costa Rica at the international level, seeking to defend the principles of international law and international treaties in force in the country.

== See also ==
- Minister of Foreign Affairs (Costa Rica), for a list of office-holders
- List of diplomatic missions in Costa Rica
- Foreign relations of Costa Rica
