= Latin America–United Kingdom relations =

Historical international relations between United Kingdom and Latin America

United Kingdom of Great Britain and Northern Ireland

Latin America

Latin America–United Kingdom relations are the diplomatic, economic and cultural relations between the United Kingdom and the countries of Latin America.

England and Great Britain had long-standing interests in colonial Latin America, including privateering, the slave trade (and its abolition), and founding their own colonies in the West Indies. Britain supported the independence of the Latin American colonies from Spain around 1820, and developed extensive trade and financial relationships with most of the newly independent countries, opening shipping lines and building railways. After the Spanish–American War of 1898, American financial interests increasingly played a role in the diplomatic relations. Traditional British business interests continued until most of its regional assets were sold in 1914–1918 to pay for the British war effort during the First World War.

After 1820, British military involvements were minimal in the region. A boundary squabble with Venezuela in the 1890s turned dangerous when the United States intervened; there were no profound issues involved and the dispute was soon permanently resolved.

The United Kingdom operated a programme of covert action in Latin America in the 1960s. There was a short successful war to expel an Argentine invasion of the Falkland Islands in 1982.

== Colonial era ==
In the colonial era of Latin America before 1820, England and Great Britain was allied with Portugal, and maintained friendly diplomatic relations with Portugal's colony in Brazil. Despite this, English privateers launched attacks on Brazilian ports, such as Santos in 1591.

However, there was often serious hostility with Spain. Independent English privateers frequently attacked Spanish interests, and dreamed of somehow attacking and seizing the annual Spanish fleet that brought gold and silver back to Spain. The 16th century, Sir John Hawkins and Sir Francis Drake were leading privateers. In the 17th century the Caribbean was a favourite target, especially 1655 two 1670 on Spanish ships and Spanish towns. In various wars, English privateers seized bases in Spanish Jamaica and other Spanish colonies in the Caribbean, and buccaneers established a foothold on the mainland in Central America. In 1671, Welsh privateer Henry Morgan sacked and burned Panama City, looting its treasures of gold, silver and jewels, but overlooking the golden altar, which had been painted over to disguise its value. From his base in Port Royal, Jamaica, Morgan raided settlements and shipping on the Spanish Main, becoming wealthy as he use the prize money gained to purchase three large sugar plantations.

British merchants handled most of the trade between Europe and Latin America, due to few Spanish or Portuguese merchants being in competition. By 1824 as Spain left the region about 90 British commercial houses were operating in the former Spanish colonies, with a concentration in Buenos Aires. Already in 1810 there were 200 in Brazil. The Atlantic slave trade had significant British participation until the British outlawed it in 1807, and in 1833 abolished slavery in all its colonies. Spain granted exclusive rights to the British South Sea Company to supply slaves to its colonies. The South Sea Company simultaneously engaged in illegal commercial trade as well, and once Spain tried to stop it the result was the Anglo-Spanish War of Jenkins' Ear that dragged on for a decade after 1739. The war began after Welsh merchant Robert Jenkins was seized by Spanish sailors who cut off his ears. The British captured Porto Bello in November 1739. Governor James Oglethorpe of Georgia led an attack on St. Augustine, Florida, in 1740; Spain retaliated with an attack in St. Simon's Island, Georgia. The failed attempt to take Cartagena de Indias in 1743 marked their defeat in the War of Jenkins' Ear, which lead to the British withdrawing to focus naval efforts on their North American wars (1775–1783) and resulting in the Anglo-Spanish War in the Americas (1779–1783). British maritime activity in the late 1790s became more aggressive and began actively gaining territory in the Caribbean (see Trinidad remained Spanish until 1797) to enable greater British mercantile trade in the area. At the time, they also furthered their interest against Spain, (see the Black Legend).

During the Napoleonic Wars of 1801–1815, Spain was controlled by Napoleon and its colonies were now a potential target for the Royal Navy. The great British naval victory at Trafalgar in October 1805 decisively gave control of the oceans to the British, and ended Napoleonic overseas dreams.

After that the Admiralty decides the invasion of the Viceroyalty of River Plate. British Admiral Home Riggs Popham launched an invasion of the Spanish colony of La Plata (modern-day Argentina). Popham had an army of 1500 men, who quickly captured the fort at Buenos Aires, capturing the city of 55,000 inhabitants. Argentine creoles (that is, native-born men of Spanish descent) mobilized their local and nearby forces, including 1,000 soldiers from the nearby city of Montevideo. They overpowered the British, who surrendered on August 14, 1806. In response London sent new armies to Buenos Aires and Valparaiso. The second British attack came in 1807, as British General John Whitelocke brought 12,000 soldiers for his invasions of Montevideo and Buenos Aires. The decisive battle came in June 1807; the Argentines were outnumbered 12,000 to 9,000. They nevertheless prevailed and the British again surrendered. Meanwhile, Napoleon invaded Portugal, and the Royal Navy rescued the royal family taking it to Brazil.

== Independence era after 1820 ==
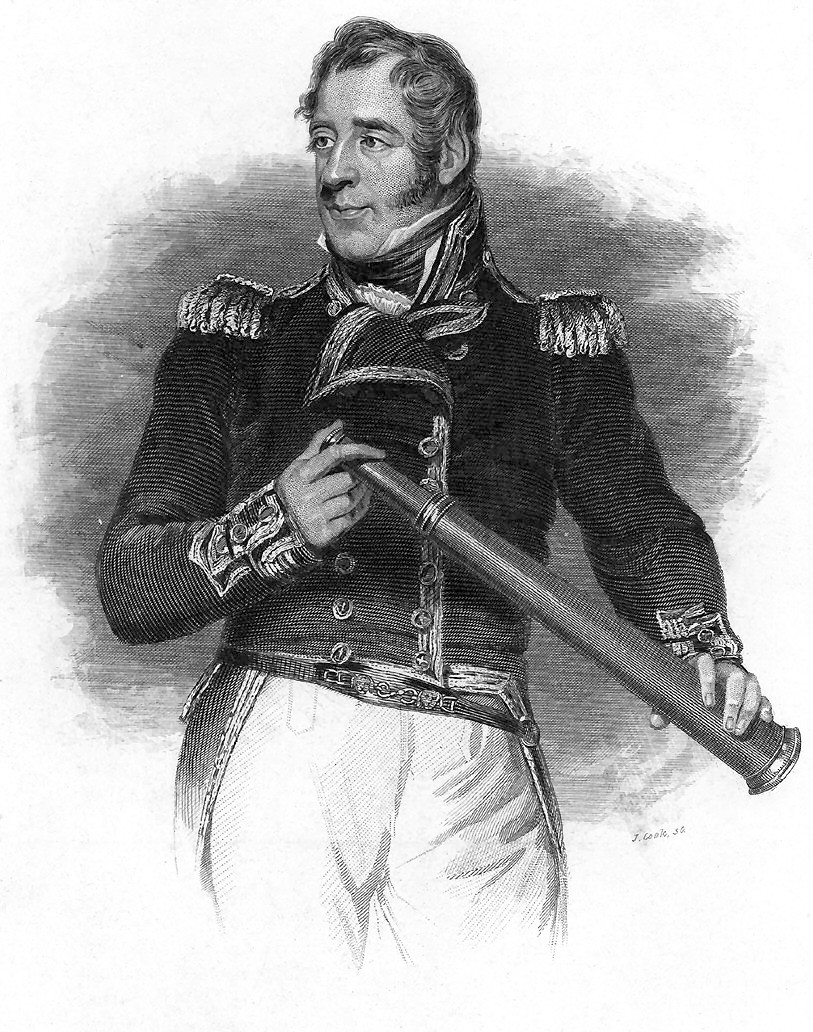
Admiral Thomas Cochrane, the 10th Earl of Dundonald.

The French invasion of Spain conducted by Napoleon in 1808 looking the Spain colonies to gain independence, the Venezuelan Junta formed in Caracas by 1810 was the first Junta to engage in diplomacy to gain ties to Great Britain. This opened a fierce military conflict over control of the Spanish colonies. By 1818, Spain had regained control of all of its colonies. Suddenly starting in 1819, with the return of Simón Bolívar from exile Spain's power collapsed and one after another succeeded in breaking away, except for Cuba and Puerto Rico. Admiral Thomas Cochrane was the most prominent of some 10,000 British mercenaries hired to organize the ad hoc armies and navies fighting for independence from Spain. Cochrane organised and led the rebel navies of Chile and Brazil and helped Peru as well.

The independence of Latin American countries after 1826, opened lucrative prospects for London financiers despite the crash of 1825. The region was gravely devastated by the wars of independence, and with weak financial systems, weak governments and repeated coups and internal rebellions. However, the region had a well-developed export sector focused on the foods that were in demand in Europe, especially sugar, coffee, cocoa, wheat and (after the arrival of refrigeration in the 1860s), beef. There also was a well-developed mining sector. With the Spanish out of the picture, the region in the early 1820s was a devastated region suffering in a deep depression. It urgently needed capital, entrepreneurs, financiers, and shippers. Britain rushed in to fill the void by the middle 1820s, as the London government used its diplomatic power to encourage large-scale investment, and the Royal Navy provided protection against piracy. The British established communities of merchants in major cities—including 3,000 Britons in Buenos Aires. London financiers purchased £17 million in Latin American government bonds, especially those of Argentina, Chile, Peru and Mexico. They invested another £35 million in 46 stock companies set up to operate primarily in Latin America. The bubble soon burst, but the survivors operated quietly and profitably for many decades. In the 1820s–1850s, over 260 British merchant houses operated in the River Plate or Chile, and hundreds more in the rest of Latin America. The Latin American market was important for the cotton manufacturers of Lancashire. They supported the independence movement, and persuaded the British government to station commercial consuls in all the major trading centers in Latin America. the British were permanently committed, and it took decades – until the 1860s – before the commercial and involvement paid serious dividends. By 1875, Latin America was firmly integrated into transatlantic economy under British leadership. After 1898, the British had to compete commercially with the Americans.

In a long-term perspective, Britain's influence in Latin America was enormous after independence came in the 1820s. Britain intentionally sought to replace the Spanish in economic and cultural affairs. Military issues and the establishment of new colonies were minor factors. The influence was exerted through diplomacy, trade, banking, and investment in railways and mines. The English language and British cultural norms were transmitted by energetic young British business agents on temporary assignment in the major commercial centers, where they invited locals into the British leisure activities, such as organized sports, and into their transplanted cultural institutions such as clubs and schools. The impact on sports was overwhelming, as Latin America enthusiastically took up football (soccer). In Argentina, rugby, polo, tennis and golf became important in middle-class leisure. Cricket was ignored. The British role never disappeared, but it faded rapidly after 1914 as the British cashed in their investments to pay for their Great War, and the United States moved into the region with overwhelming force and similar cultural norms.

=== Confrontations ===
There were no actual wars directly involving Britain, however there were several confrontations. The most serious came in 1845–1850 when British and French navies blockaded Buenos Aires in order to protect the independence of Uruguay from Juan Manuel de Rosas, the dictator of Argentina. Other lesser controversies with Argentina broke out in 1833, with Guatemala in 1859, Mexico in 1861, Nicaragua in 1894, and Venezuela in 1895 and 1902. There also was tension in Mosquitia in the 1830s and 1840s.

=== Transoceanic canal ===
London's interest in Central America began in the 17th century, focused first in Belize, the Bay Islands, and Mosquitia. Washington's interest began in 1824 with the diplomatic recognition of the five states of Central America. Britain consolidated its hold on the Caribbean shore and an unforeseen result was a direct clash with the United States. In 1848 the U.S. saw the need a transoceanic canal, a plan reinforced by the flood of gold seekers using a Central-American transit route in 1849. One route under consideration went through Nicaragua but was frustrated by British presence in Mosquitia. This conflict was resolved in 1850 when the two powers agreed in the Clayton–Bulwer Treaty to renounce territorial possessions along the route of a possible canal. To prevent the domination of Pacific trade routes by the other, each agreed that any canal would be neutral and they would not acquire formal colonies on the route. In 1901 Britain renounced its claims in the Hay–Pauncefote Treaty, allowing the United States to build the Panama Canal, which opened in 1914.

=== Informal empire in Latin America ===
In a highly influential interpretation, John Andrew Gallagher and Ronald Robinson argue that the perceived pause in British expansion in the mid-19th century is misleading, for Britain was in fact successful in achieving its main goal of building an informal empire, with strong economic relationships to small independent countries, especially in Latin America. Other historians have found that coercion was seldom necessary in Latin America and the British government played a passive role. The Royal Navy made sure that London's fast overseas network was well protected. London provided finance, insurance, and shipping, handled imports and exports, purchased and refinanced of bonds and government debts, and sent money and engineers to build the railway network. Young British agents on temporary duty in every major port provided close links to the mother country, and provided a model of middle-class business and cultural leadership that many Latin Americans emulated. Latin American business realized the advantage of close ties with the world's leading banker and trader. Gallagher and Robinson argue that, using informal dependencies in the mid-Victorian age, there was much effort to open the continental interiors and to extend the British influence inland from the ports. The general strategy of this development was to convert these areas into complementary satellite economies, which would provide food and raw materials for Great Britain, and also provide widening markets for its manufactures....Once entry had been forced into Latin America ... the task was to encourage stable governments as good investment risks, just as in weaker or unsatisfactory states it was considered necessary to coerce them into more cooperative attitudes.

=== Search for cotton ===
Cotton textiles were Britain's leading manufacturing product in the mid-19th century, and most of the raw cotton came from the southern United States. The American Civil War cut off most of the supply, although limited amounts were available through blockade runners, and through purchases in New York of cotton owned by the Union. It became a high British priority to find new sources, looking especially Egypt, India, and Brazil.

== 20th century ==
Britain operated a programme of covert action in Latin America in the 1960s, including attempts to influence elections and to disrupt trade unions in a number of countries. The aims were to counter communism, develop trade links and win influence with the United States.

== Cultural relations ==
=== Sport ===
The British impact on sports was overwhelming, as Latin America took up football (called fútbol in Spanish and futebol in Portuguese). In Argentina, rugby, polo, tennis and golf became important middle-class leisure pastimes.

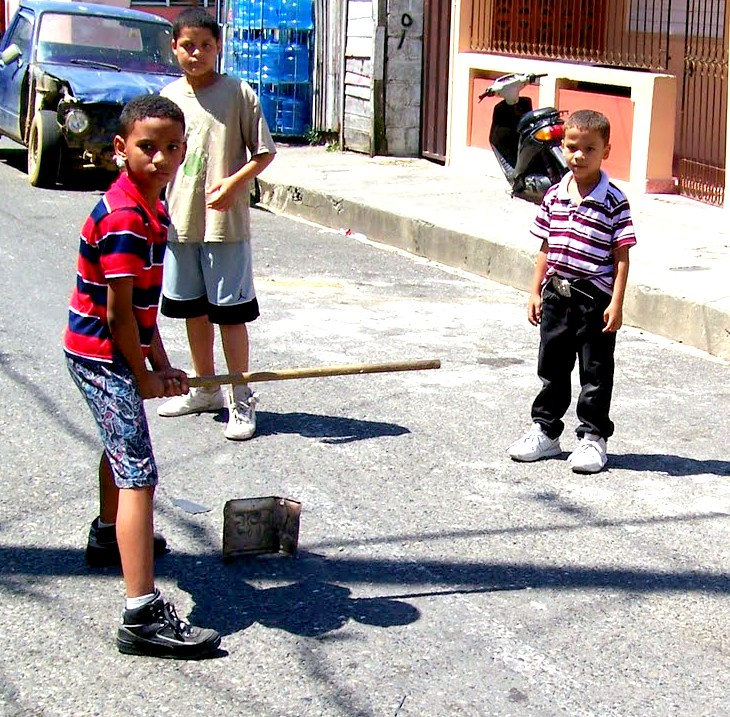
Plaquita, a Dominican street version of cricket. The Dominican Republic was first introduced to cricket through mid-18th century British contact, but switched to baseball after the 1916 American occupation.

In some parts of the Caribbean and Central America baseball outshined soccer in terms of popularity. The sport started in the late 19th century when sugar companies imported cane cutters from the British Caribbean. During their free time, the workers would play cricket, but later, during the long period of US military occupation, cricket gave way to baseball, which rapidly assumed widespread popularity, although cricket remains the favorite in the British Caribbean. Baseball had the greatest following in those nations occupied at length by the US military, especially the Dominican Republic and Cuba, as well as Nicaragua, Panama, and Puerto Rico. Even Venezuela, which wasn't occupied by the US military during this time period, still became a popular baseball destination. All of these countries have emerged as sources of baseball talent, since many players hone their skills on local teams, or in “academies” managed by the US Major Leagues to cultivate the most promising young men for their own teams. Baseball5, an official variation of baseball, was inspired in 2017 by Latin American street variations of baseball as well.

== Representative relations ==
=== Argentina ===
They established diplomatic relations on 15 December 1823. By mid-century, London bankers were sending in capital, to invest in railways, docks, packing houses, and utilities. London sent in 3000 agents to handle shipping, insurance, and banking.

There was still a labor shortage, which was solved when Italian and Spanish immigrants started to migrate to Argentina, often on British passenger liners. Britain was the main purchaser of Argentine beef and grain. During the Second World War, Argentina refused to go along with the American anti-German policies. The United States responded by trying to shut down Argentine exports. President Franklin Roosevelt asked Prime Minister Winston Churchill to stop buying Argentine beef and grain. Churchill refused, saying the food was urgently needed.

They went to war—the Falklands War—over ownership of the Falkland Islands in 1982; Britain drove out Argentine invaders.

=== Brazil ===
In 1807, all members of the royal court of Portugal (probably 4,000 to 7,000 individuals) were relocated to Brazil by the British Navy in the transfer of the Portuguese Court to Brazil to avoid being captured by the French. Pedro the Prince Regent came with his father, King of Portugal, Dom Joao VI. When his father went back to Portugal in 1821, Pedro remained in Brazil as Prince Regent. Brazilian trade had been limited to the mother country, but now the Prince Regent expanded it to encourage commerce with all friendly nations, especially Great Britain. This expansion of trade led to the economic and eventually political independence of Brazil from Portugal in 1822.

==== Slave trade ====
The two nations established diplomatic relations in 1826, after the British imposed a treaty pledging the total abolition of the Atlantic slave trade. By the 1830s, British financiers and merchants effectively controlled the leading sectors of the Brazilian economy. A high priority of the British government was ending the large-scale Brazilian slave trade, but Brazilian elites strongly resisted, saying the treaties had been coerced and were invalid. in 1845, the Royal Navy started to target Brazilian slave ships seizing the ships and freeing the slaves onboard. Tensions escalated and there was a threat of war. Meanwhile, Brazilian plantation owners imported as many slaves as they possibly could, 19,000 in 1846, and 50,000 in 1847. Finally, in 1850, the Brazilian government passed laws that virtually ended Brazilian involvement in the slave trade. That ended the tension with Britain, but the practice of slavery continued in Brazil. By the 1850s, Brazil provided about a third of the raw cotton used in British factories.

They were allies in the Second World War, fighting alongside each other in Italy against Nazi Germany.

=== Chile ===
British naval officers assisted Chile in its fight for independence, and over the following decades a number of Britons settled in Chile such as in Coquimbo. In tandem with British investors, Chile entered world economic trade during the 1810s–1830s. the new country was poor, but investors were optimistic regarding its resources in agriculture and mining. Copper and silver production increased, as did farm output. The population grew, and trade rapidly expanded. most important, Chile developed the institutional mechanisms for sustained economic growth and more complex trade relationships.

=== Mexico ===
After Mexico achieved its independence in 1821, Britain was the first European great power to recognize Mexican sovereignty. Soon afterwards, Emperor Agustín de Iturbide sent a diplomatic envoy to London to establish diplomatic communications between the two nations. In 1837, Mexico signed a treaty with Britain to abolish the slave trade. The British established a network of merchant houses in the major cities. However, according to Hilarie J. Heath, the results were bleak: trade was stagnant, imports did not pay, contraband drove prices down, debts private and public went unpaid, merchants suffered all manner of injustices and operated at the mercy of weak and corruptible governments, with commercial houses skirting bankruptcy.

In 1861, Mexican President Benito Juarez suspended Mexico's interest payments to its creditors in France, Spain and the UK. This act angered the three nations and in October 1861 by the Convention of London the three sent a joint naval force to Mexico to demand repayment. In December 1861 the triple-alliance took the port of Veracruz and nearby towns. After a few months, both the Spanish and British government became aware that Emperor Napoleon III of France was planning to colonize Mexico in order to expand its empire and take advantage of the fact that the United States was tied down in its civil war and was not able to enforce the Monroe Doctrine. In early 1862, Britain and Spain pulled their forces from Mexico, but France took control and imposed an emperor. He was defeated and executed by Juarez in 1867.

After 1880, the British turned their attention in Mexico primarily to investments in railways and mines, sending both money and engineers and skilled mechanics. The British invested £7.4 million in railways during the decade of the 1880s, jumping to £53.4 million in the 1910s. The decade-total of new investment in mining went from £1.3 million in the 1880s to £11.6 million in the 1910s. Investments in land and other properties rose from near zero in the 1880s to £19.7 million in the 1910s. The totals reached £135 million, almost as much as the United States. In 1900, there were 2,800 British citizens living in Mexico, a relatively small number in contrast to the 15,000 Americans, 16,000 Spaniards, 4,000 French, and 2,600 Germans. The British were famed for their sophisticated gentlemen clubs, and their elaborate sports program—English football became a highly popular sport across Mexico; while cricket was ignored.

In 1938 the government of Lázaro Cárdenas nationalised land owned by British oil companies in Mexico. After 1945, bilateral relations normalized and trade re-commenced.

=== Venezuela ===
During the Venezuelan crisis of 1895 there was a longstanding dispute between the United Kingdom and Venezuela about the Essequibo territory, which Britain claimed as part of British Guiana and Venezuela asserting the region as Venezuelan territory. The dispute had become a diplomatic crisis when Venezuelan representatives argued that British behaviour over the issue violated the 1823 Monroe Doctrine and used its influence in the American government to pursue the matter. US President Grover Cleveland adopted a broad interpretation of the doctrine that did forbade new European colonies but also declared an American interest in any matter in the hemisphere. After tense diplomatic dialogues, the British government accepted the US demand for arbitration. The status of the territory later became subject to the Geneva Agreement of 1966, which was signed by the United Kingdom, Venezuela and British Guiana on 17 February 1966. This treaty stipulates that the parties will agree to find a practical, peaceful and satisfactory solution to the dispute. Disputes over the territory have continued since, even after Guyana was granted independence the same year.

Britain was involved in the Venezuelan crisis of 1902–1903, during an Italo-German blockade of Venezuela to enforce payment of Venezuelan debts.

== United Kingdom's foreign relations with Latin American countries ==
- Argentina
- Bolivia
- Brazil
- Chile
- Colombia
- Costa Rica
- Cuba
- Dominican Republic
- Ecuador
- El Salvador
- Guatemala
- Honduras
- Mexico
- Nicaragua
- Panama
- Paraguay
- Peru
- Uruguay
- Venezuela

== See also ==
- British colonization of the Americas
- Central America–United Kingdom Association Agreement
- History of Latin America
- History of the foreign relations of the United Kingdom
- Latin American migration to the United Kingdom
- Latin America–United States relations
- List of Latin Americans in the United Kingdom
- Timeline of British diplomatic history
