= Honduras–United Kingdom relations =

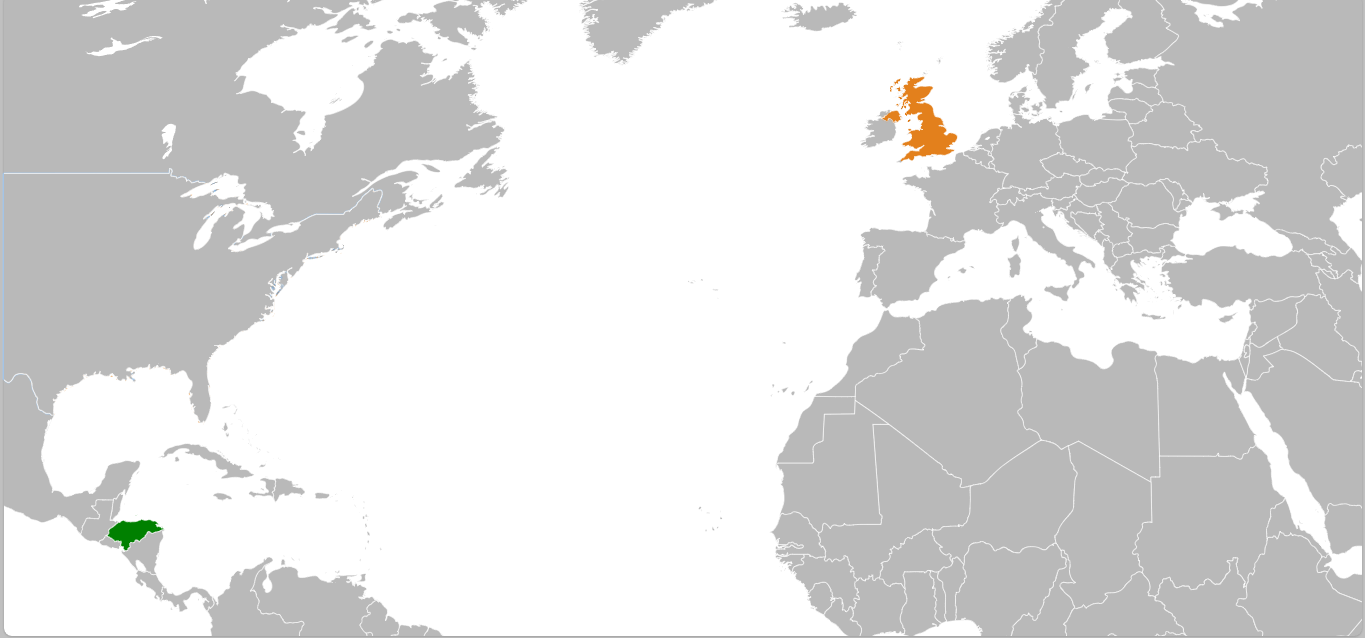

- Honduras: United Kingdom

Diplomatic mission
- Embassy of Honduras, London: Embassy of the United Kingdom, Guatemala City

Honduras–United Kingdom relations are the bilateral relations between Honduras and the United Kingdom.

Both countries share common membership of the International Criminal Court, the World Trade Organization, and the Central America–United Kingdom Association Agreement.

== History ==
The UK governed the Mosquito Coast, a coastal region divided between modern day Honduras and Nicaragua, from 1638 to 1787 and 1816 to 1819. In 1850, disputes about management of the region led to the Clayton–Bulwer Treaty.

In 2016, Joyce Anelay, Minister of State at the Foreign and Commonwealth Office, visited Honduras to strengthen relations between the two countries, as well as to discuss topics such as human rights. This was the first visit by a British minister in over 15 years.

In 2017, the South Atlantic Environmental Research Institute, based in the Falkland Islands, teamed up with Honduras for oceanic research. This was seen as a landmark gesture in relations regarding the Falkland Islands in Latin America.

In 2018, the United Kingdom and Honduras worked together to detect fake passports in order to combat human trafficking in the region.

In 2022, Nick Whittingham, British Ambassador to Honduras, visited the country to discuss human rights, economic ties, and climate issues.

In 2023, Honduras and the United Kingdom signed a memorandum of understanding to implement the Biodiverse Landscapes Fund, a measure to combat climate change.

In August 2024, Honduras implemented new visa requirements, which initially included the United Kingdom. Shortly after, the United Kingdom was removed from the requirements.

In 2025, Juliana Correa, British Ambassador to Honduras, met with Honduran Foreign Minister Javier Bu Soto in San Pedro Sula to reaffirm the strong and growing relationship between the two countries. They discussed climate change, preventing drug trafficking, and economic ties. In 2026, Correa met with Emilio Hernández Hércules, the new Honduran Secretary of Finance, in an introductory meeting. She also attended the inauguration of Nasry Asfura.

On 17 September, 2026, Charles III sent a message to Honduras congratulating them on Honduran Independence Day.

== Economic relations ==
From 1 August 2013 until 30 December 2020, trade between Honduras and the UK was governed by the Central America–European Union Association Agreement, while the United Kingdom was a member of the European Union.

Following the withdrawal of the United Kingdom from the European Union, the UK and Honduras signed the Central America–United Kingdom Association Agreement on 18 July 2019. The Central America–United Kingdom Association Agreement is a continuity trade agreement, based on the EU free trade agreement, which entered into force on 1 January 2021. Trade value between Central America and the United Kingdom was worth £2,624 million in 2022.

In 2024, a delegate from UK Export Finance visited Honduras to discuss competitive financing. Banco Atlántico, Central American Bank for Economic Integration, and various Secretaries of Finance and Investment attended the event.

In 2026, the UK-backed Mitigation Action Facility provided support to farmers in Honduras.

== Diplomatic missions ==
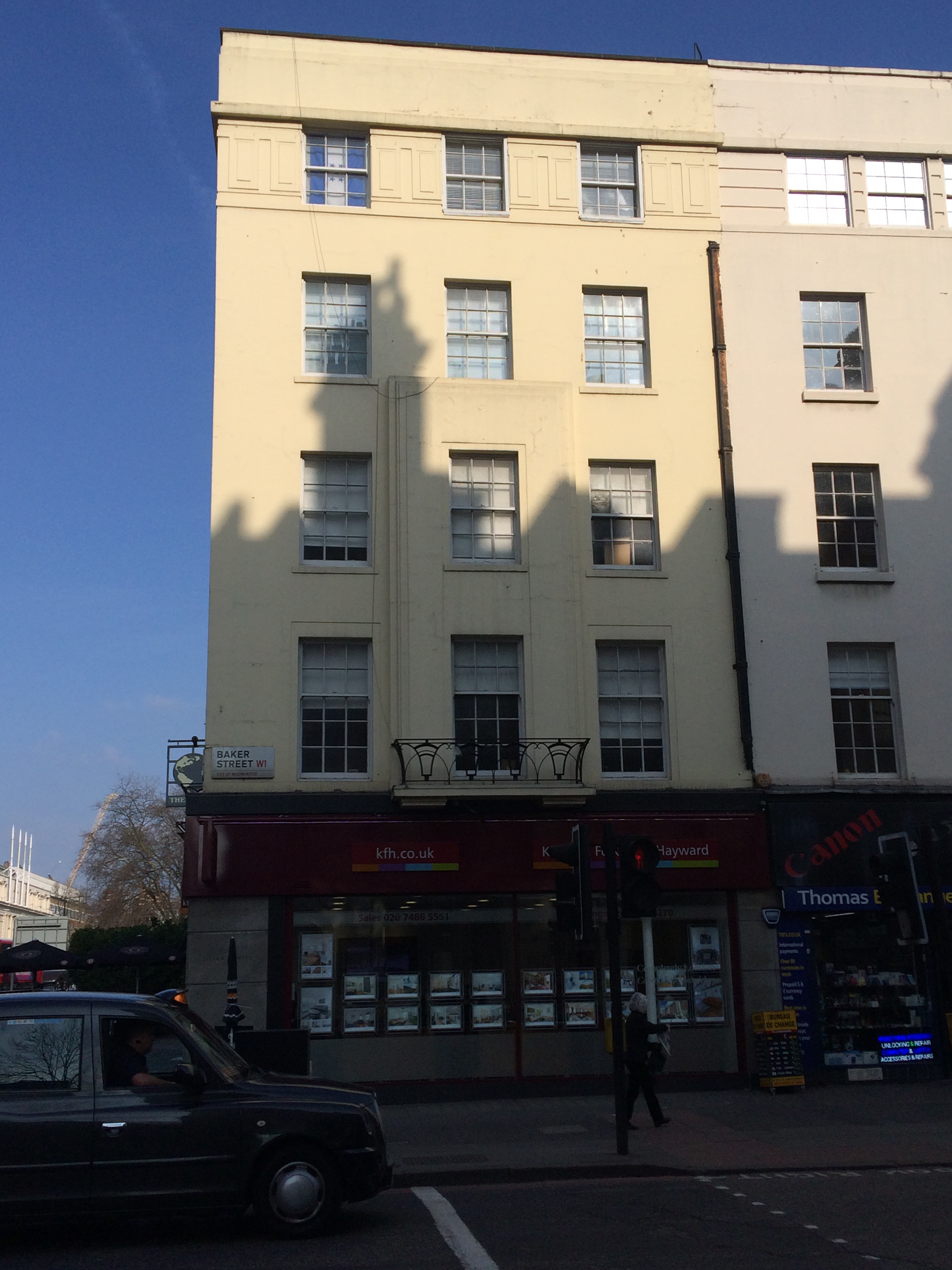
Embassy of Honduras in London

- Honduras maintains an embassy in London.
- The United Kingdom is not accredited to Honduras through an embassy; the UK is accredited to Honduras through its embassy in Guatemala City, Guatemala.

== See also ==
- Foreign relations of Honduras
- Foreign relations of the United Kingdom
- Latin America–United Kingdom relations
