= Colombia–United Kingdom relations =

- Colombia: United Kingdom

Diplomatic mission
- Embassy of Colombia, London: British Embassy, Colombia

Envoy
- Ambassador: Ambassador George Hodgson

Colombia–United Kingdom relations are the bilateral and diplomatic relations between Colombia and the United Kingdom. Colombian-Anglo relations begin in 1810, and stem from the end of the Napoleonic Wars in 1815 and the service of the British Legions who helped Colombia to win independence through Simón Bolívar's campaign to liberate New Granada in 1819–1820. However the first known English person to have travelled to modern day Colombia was Sir John Hawkins in 1565.

== Background ==
Major interest in Colombia for the UK has lain in environmental protection and for Colombia the direct financial investment from the UK, military assistance, and gas production. Bilateral trade currently stands at £1 Billion.

=== History ===
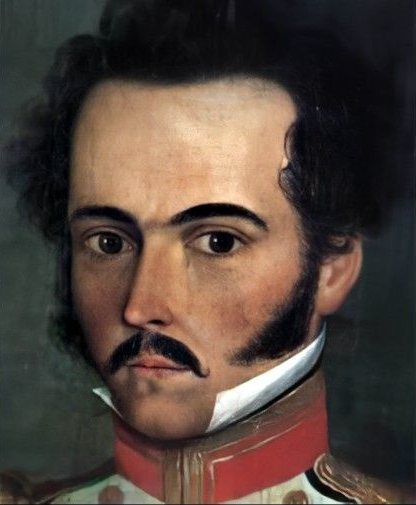
Simón Bolivar in 1812

=== Independence war ===
In July 1819 during the gruelling crossing the Andes through the Paramo Pisba the entire army had lost around 300 men en route, of whom 60 were from the British Legion. At Battle of Vargas Swamp the captain Arthur Sandes was wounded twice and had his horse shot under him. Few days after at battle of Boyaca the colonel James Rooke fought with distinction, as he led his legion in a bayonet charge storming uphill against the Spanish defences. During this action both Rooke and Daniel Florence O'Leary were wounded, with Rooke's being of grave concern which led to the amputation of his left arm. In Angostura, Bolivar was proclaimed as President of the Republic of Colombia including present-day Colombia, Panama, and Venezuela, along with parts of northern Peru, northwestern Brazil and Guyana. The British Government on paper however were still in support of Spain in official channels, apart from a number of liberal politicians, but British public favour went with Colombian patriots and favored pressuring the government to open new trade markets with these newly formed Spanish American groups in 1817 and 1818.

Of Bolívar's force in the Battle of Carabobo between 340 or 350 were men of the British Rangers battalion, the great majority of them of Anglophone origin, commanded by Colonel Thomas Ilderton Ferrier including many former members of the King's German Legion. Though greatly outnumbered and low on supplies, the legion soldiers managed to maintain control of tactically critical hills. By the battle's end, the legionary force had suffered 119 deaths, of which 11 were officers. Col. Ferrier was among the dead. Bolívar later praised the Legion troops and called them the "Saviors of my Fatherland", noting that they had distinguished themselves among other armies.

By 29 February 1824, the royalist troops under General Monet had regained control of Lima and Bolívar fled to North. HMS Cambridge docked at Callao Harbour on 8 June 1824, and the British consul Thomas Edward Rowcroft and his daughter, Leonora Maria, disembarked there for his post at Lima. Having regrouped at North in Trujillo, Bolívar in June led his Army forces south to confront the Spanish under Field Marshal José de Canterac. Bolívar sent some 8,000 soldiers, in a hurry to try to cut the royalist retreat towards Cusco, also with a force 8,000 soldiers. Bolivar also sent out his 1,000-strong cavalry to delay the movement of Spanish troops out of the Plain of Huancayo a marshland at around 4,100 meters (13,500 ft) above sea level. At Callao Roads, HMS Cambridge, under Captain Thomas Maling, was attacked by Spanish gunboat on July 3.

The Colombian state was recognized by the United Kingdom on 1 January 1825, and Manuel José Hurtado was the first South American envoy recognized by a European state

=== Assassination attempt ===
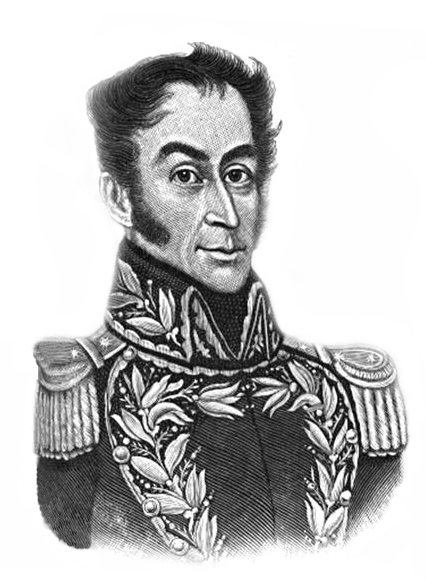
Simón Bolívar, target of the September Conspiracy attack.

On the night of September 25, 1828 about twelve civilians and twenty-five soldiers led by Pedro Carujo broke into the Presidential Palace (Palacio de San Carlos) and killed the guards. Upon learning of the attack, Bolívar managed to jump out of the window while Manuela Saenz entertained and engaged the conspirators. The result of this conspiracy was the death of Colonel William Ferguson, an Irish aide-de-camp that Carujo mistook for General Bolívar and shot him in the back, mortally wounding him. Vargas's battalion led by Colonel Whittle contributed to the failure of the conspiracy. On September 28, a public funeral was held, and Ferguson was buried in a Catholic cathedral (unusual for a Protestant). Finally, it was up to Generals Rafael Urdaneta and José María Córdova to put an end to the plot, control the situation in the capital and imprison those involved in this sinister attack.

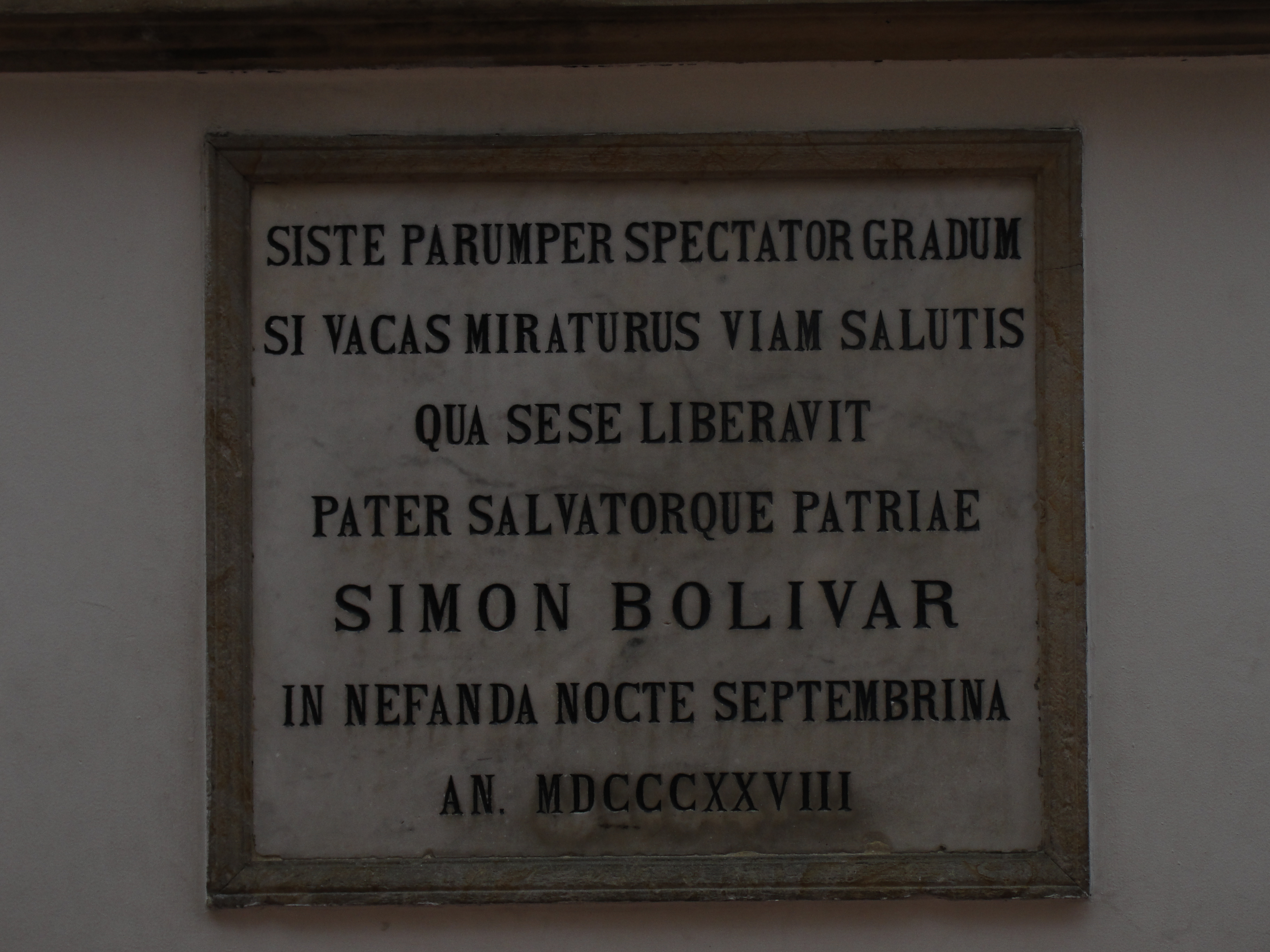
Photo of the plaque in the Palacio de San Carlos

During the days that followed, the alleged culprits were arrested and a "trial" followed for many of them as Vice president Francisco de Paula Santander and Admiral Padilla.

=== Dissolution of Gran Colombia ===
In 1829 when the Government in Bogotá learned of the antibolivarian insurrection of general Cordova, it dispatched a division of eight hundred veteran troops. commanded by Irish Colonel Daniel Florencio O'Leary, to put down the insurrection. The two forced clashed near the small town of Santuario. The bloody fight lasted two hours, with rebel forces defeated. Cordova who was wounded took refuge in a small house that had been converted into a hospital. He would be killed there by Colonel Rupert Hand, an Irish mercenary, who struck his head three times with his saber. In 1830 the Gran Colombia was dissolved due to the political differences that existed between supporters of federalism and centralism, as well as regional tensions among the peoples that made up the republic. It broke into the successor states of New Granada, Ecuador, and Venezuela. Since New Granada State territory corresponded more or less to the original jurisdiction of the former Viceroyalty of New Granada, it also claimed the Caribbean coast of Nicaragua, the Mosquito Coast.

=== Steamships and steam trains ===
In the latter half of the 19th century, British merchants came to the area for the Coffee which in this century has become an important import once more. Steamships and steam trains began to be invested in the 1870s–1890s by English merchants and the Colombian government to transport goods such as Bananas, tobacco, coffee and European imports, which proved to create a flourishing community of British ex-pats in Colombia and spread out across the South Americas. The British expat community later controlled a portion of the railways in Colombia such as the Cartagena Railway line, the Colombian Northern Railway and the Southern Bogota Railway line by 1906, with all railways returning to Colombian ownership by the 1930s.

=== Chronology of Colombian–British relations ===
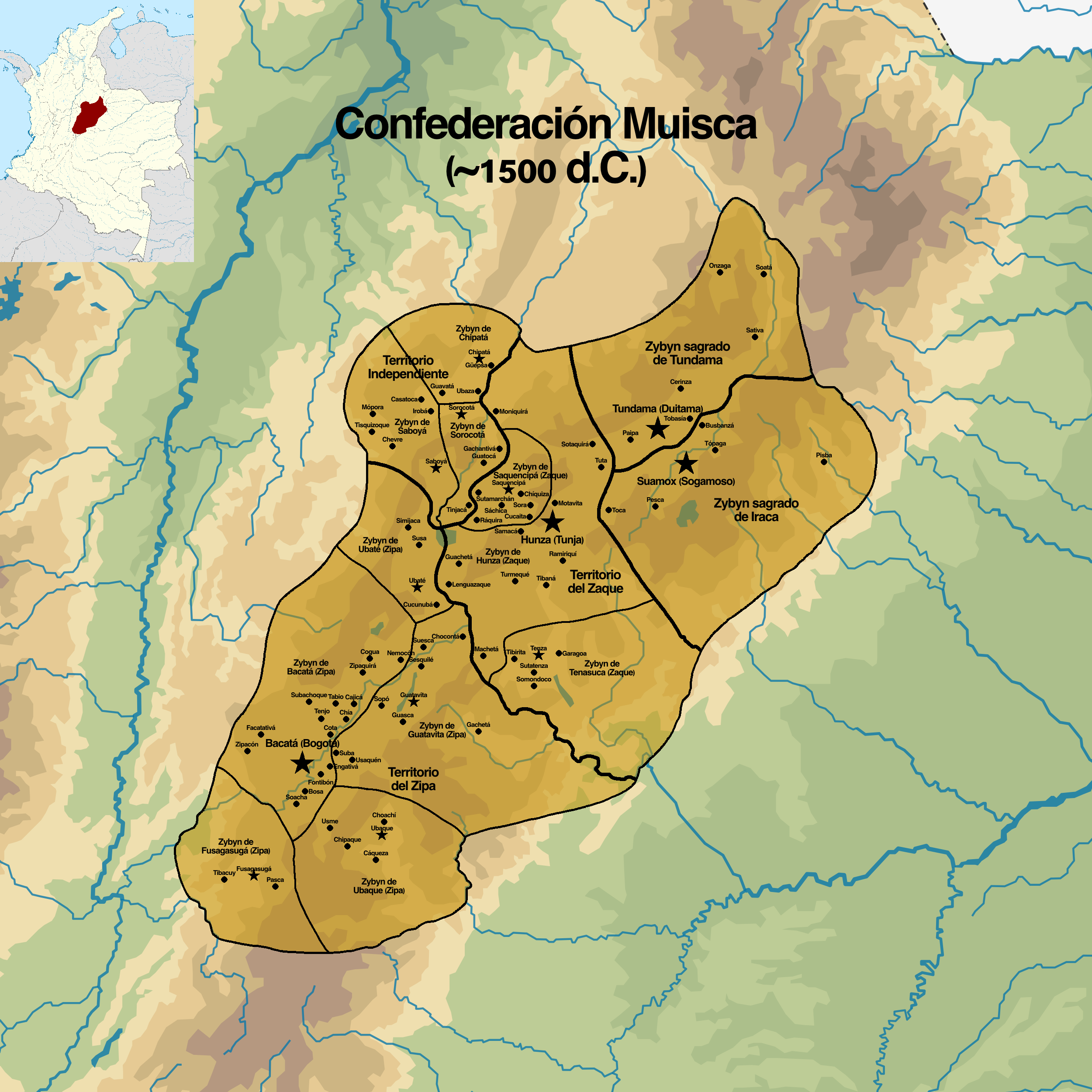
Muisca Confederation Map

Early

- 1565 - The slave trader John Hawkins attempts to trade in enslaved peoples from Sierra Leone with local peoples in Riohacha
- 1586 - Battle of Cartagena occurs, with Francis Drake capturing the strategic settlement of Cartagena
- 1595 - Raleigh's El Dorado Expedition for the city El Dorado takes place with the crew travelling the Orinoco River in modern-day Venezuela, with two Englishman left behind with local Indian chiefs, to whom he exhibited a portrait of Queen Elizabeth and promised to return and liberate them from Spanish dominion ... [whom were] promptly arrested by the Spanish colonial [authorities], who warned local chiefs to only trade with the Spanish
- 1596 - Francis Drake ransacks the city of Riohacha, sailing away with 100 slaves as part of his booty
- 1617 - Watt Raleigh with an expedition traverses the Orinoco, until he was killed in a battle with the Spanish
- 1660-1668 - Henry Morgan operated a smuggling trade from Jamaica via Riohacha
- 1679 - Gorgona is visited by Bartholomew Sharp
- 1709 - Gorgorna Island is home to Woodes Rogers and William Dampier
- 1739-1748 - Battle of Cartagena de Indias occurs due to British mercantile expansionism in South Americas, with Britain withdrawing to North America not to return to the area until the 1790s
- 1758 - Battle of Cartagena whereby the British blockaded the French in the port of Cartagena occurs during the North American Seven Years' War
- 1808 - First Masonic Lodge is founded in Cartagena where José Maria Garcia-Toledo and members discussed European politics and history based on the broadsheets (Jamaica Courier and the Royal Gazette) and publications produced in Kingston, Jamaica
- 1810 - Bolivar travels to London along with Luis Lopez Mendez and Andres Bello
- 1815 - British Cartagena de Indias is declared and fails, but Annual trade with Spain is replaced by trade between Colombia and British Jamaica via the Treaty of Utrecht in the Atlantic slave trade

Colombian Independence

- 1817 - Daniel Florence O'Leary, James Rooke, Arthur Sandes, Thomas Charles Wright and John Illingworth Hunt enlist under Bolivar army
- 1818 - "El Correo del Orinoco" (the "Orinoco Post") was a newspaper created by Simón Bolívar in Angostura by July 21, 1818. As such, it is the oldest sovereign newspaper on the Latin American. The British Captain Andrés Roderick assumed as Editor of El Correo del Orinoco assisted by typographers Thomas Tavernier and Juan José Pérez.
- 1819 - Battles of Vargas Swamp and Boyaca. In Angostura Bolivar proclamated the Republic of Colombia included present-day Colombia, Panama, and Venezuela, along with parts of northern Peru, northwestern Brazil and Guyana.
- 1821 - Francisco Antonio Zea was appointed by Bolivar as special diplomatic agent of Colombia to Europe and United States. In London he negotiated loans of financial creditors Herring & Richardson and gained recognition of his new country only from the United States. Andres Roderick was retired as editor of "El Correo del Orinoco". After that Thomas Bradshaw and William Burrell Stewart became the British owners of the printing press. John Bernard served as the administrator for the latter issues.
- 1822 - The ambassador Zea dies in Bath, and a large amount of British private investment is made in the new state
- 1822 - Jose Rafael Revenga as substitute of Zea as Minister Plenipotentiary of Colombia in London, negotiated Great Britain's recognition of Colombia as an independent country.
- 1823 - Mary English known as the Belle of Santa Fe resides in Bogotá from 1823 - 1827 being the representative of financial creditors Herring & Richardson
- March 1823 - John Potter Hamilton ESP the diplomat arrives in Gran Colombia, his 1827 narrative is notable for its depictions of free black men (bogas), such as Agustín Agualongo and women in Colombia
- 1824 - Bolivar leases the Aroa mines to generate revenue to fight the Spanish in the wars of Independence. Manuel José Hurtado as substitute of Revenga as Minister Plenipotentiary of Colombia in London, negotiated Great Britain's recognition of Colombia as an independent country.
- 1825 - The republic of Gran Colombia was recognized formally by United Kingdom and Manuel José Hurtado was the first South American envoy recognized by European state
- 1826 - The London stock market crashes reducing the already small number of private brokers willing to invest in what is now considered as a risky financial investment
- 1826 - Manuel José Hurtado complained to the British government at the direction of Bolívar about the illegal presence of British settlers in Essequibo territory claimed by Colombia.
- 1827 - The new ambassador of Colombia José Fernández Madrid lives in London
- 1831 - Gran Colombia was dissolved due to the political differences that existed between supporters of federalism and centralism, as well as regional tensions among the peoples that made up the republic. It broke into the successor states of New Granada, Ecuador, and Venezuela. Since New Granada State territory corresponded more or less to the original jurisdiction of the former Viceroyalty of New Granada, it also claimed the Caribbean coast of Nicaragua, the Mosquito Coast.
- 1865 - The American jurist Florence Gonzalez translates John Stuart Mill's Considerations on Representative Government
- 1869 - The historic railway of Ferrocarril de Bolívar based in Puerto Colombia is opened with the backing of British Businessman in Colombia
- 1881 - Rosa Carnegie-Williams travels to Bogota, publishing her travel writing account A year in the Andes; or, A lady's adventures in Bogotá in 1889, which were published into Spanish in 1987
- 1882 - The English merchant Robert A Joy (1818-?) and the Colombian Manuel J. de Mier funded the Santa Marta Railway in 1882–1906 to connect Bogota with the Magdalena River, and by 1906 reached its longest length of 94 kilometers stretching to Fundación, mostly delivering Bananas
- 1889 - Samuel Smiles Self-Help is published and put into circulation in Colombia, used from 1891 - 1912 to further the goal of the education of the Colombian working classes

Modern

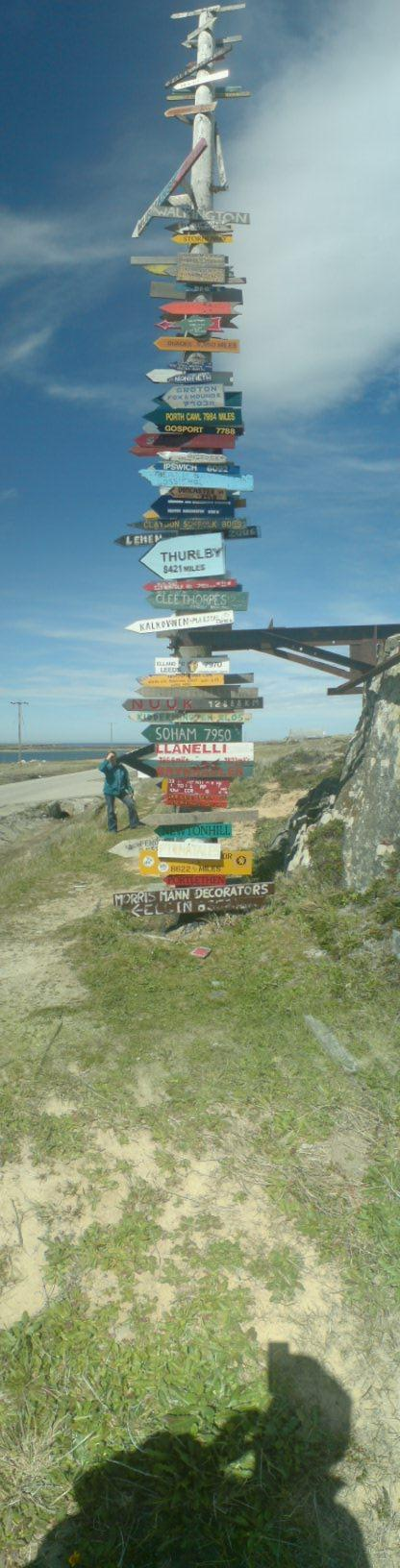
Falkland Islands, Stanley fingerposts

1903 - Panama was separated from Colombia

- 1938 - Jaime Jaramillo Arango arrives in Europe, where he is witness to Kristallnacht, the Blitz and becomes the Colombian Ambassador to the UK between (1938;)1943 - 1945
- 1940 - The British Council establish English examinations in Colombia.
- 1955 - Cricket in Colombia became more institutionally recognised on 20 May 1955 with the creation of the Bogotá Cricket Club (BCC) whose first chairman of the club was the Englishman Reginald Brand alongside and Indian Rishiraj Patel.
- 1956 - Arango establishes the Anglo Colombian School in Bogotá
- 1959 - Alfonso López Pumarejo dies in London, with Mass being attended in his name at Westminster Cathedral
- 1961 - Elizabeth Masson founds the Colegio de Inglaterra
- 1975 - Sebastian Snow crosses the Darién Gap with the Canadian Wade Davis in 1975 as part of his unbroken walk from Tierra del Fuego to Costa Rica, with the trip documented in The Rucksack Man (1976) and Davis's The Serpent and the Rainbow (1985)
- 1978-1981 - Aline Helg travels between England and Colombia to write her 1987 work La educación en Colombia, 1918-1957: una historia social, económica y política
- 1982 - Colombia backs UK in the Falkland Islands sovereignty dispute
- 1987 - David Wood (1951–?) author of An Englishman in Colombia (2013) visits Colombia
- 1980's - SAS train Colombian special forces in counter-narcotics
- 2003 - David Hutchinson the banker was kidnapped by FARC for 10 months residing in the Andes
- 2011 - Steve Cossey purchases and restores the No.8 Baldwin 1921 steam train, purportedly "the oldest operational steam engine in Colombia".
- 2015 - Mike Slee releases the nature Documentary Colombia: Wild Magic
- 2016 - Colombian President Juan Manuel Santos visits UK on a state visit.
- 2017 - Levison Woods walks through 1,700 miles across South America for Channel 4 for the programme Walking the Americas
- 2020 - 16 June - Bilateral trade agreement between two reached for post-Brexit

== Britons in Colombia ==
- Jorge Isaacs
- Richard McColl - Author and Journalist.
- Augustus Henry Mounsey - British Minister Resident and Consul General to Colombia beginning in 1881
- George Saunders - Footballer who plays for Envigado F.C.

== Colombians in the United Kingdom ==
- Steven Alzate
- Adam Garcia
- Sisco Gomez
- Tara Hoyos-Martínez
- Manuel José Hurtado
- Cristian Montaño
- Fernando Montaño
- Ian Poveda
- Courtney Webb
- Luis Díaz

== Economic relations ==
Following Brexit, the United Kingdom signed a continuity trade agreement, called the Andean Countries–United Kingdom Trade Agreement, with three Andean countries (Colombia, Ecuador, and Peru) on the 15 May 2019. Colombia was not able to ratify the free trade agreement by 1 January 2021 and could not provisionally apply the agreement. Through the exchange of diplomatic notes the United Kingdom and Colombia agreed to a bridging mechanism arrangement, which was signed on 18 October 2019, allowing the two countries to continue to trading on preferential terms until Colombia could complete its domestic procedures to fully ratify the agreement. Colombia ratified the agreement on 21 April 2022 and the UK-Andean countries free trade agreement entered into force on 28 June 2022 for Colombia.

== Resident diplomatic missions ==
- Colombia has an embassy and a consulate-general in London.
- United Kingdom has an embassy in Bogotá.
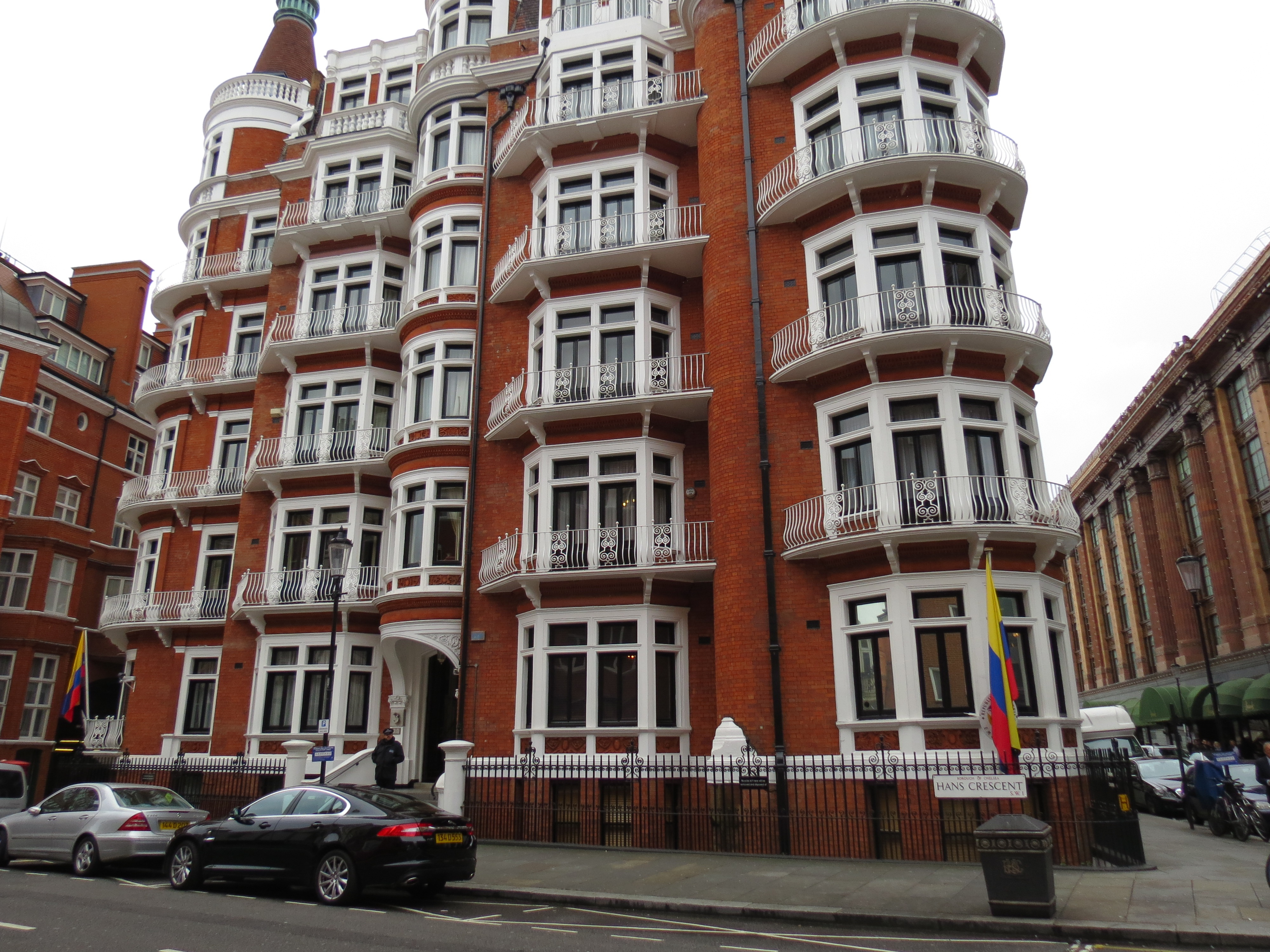
Embassy of Colombia in London

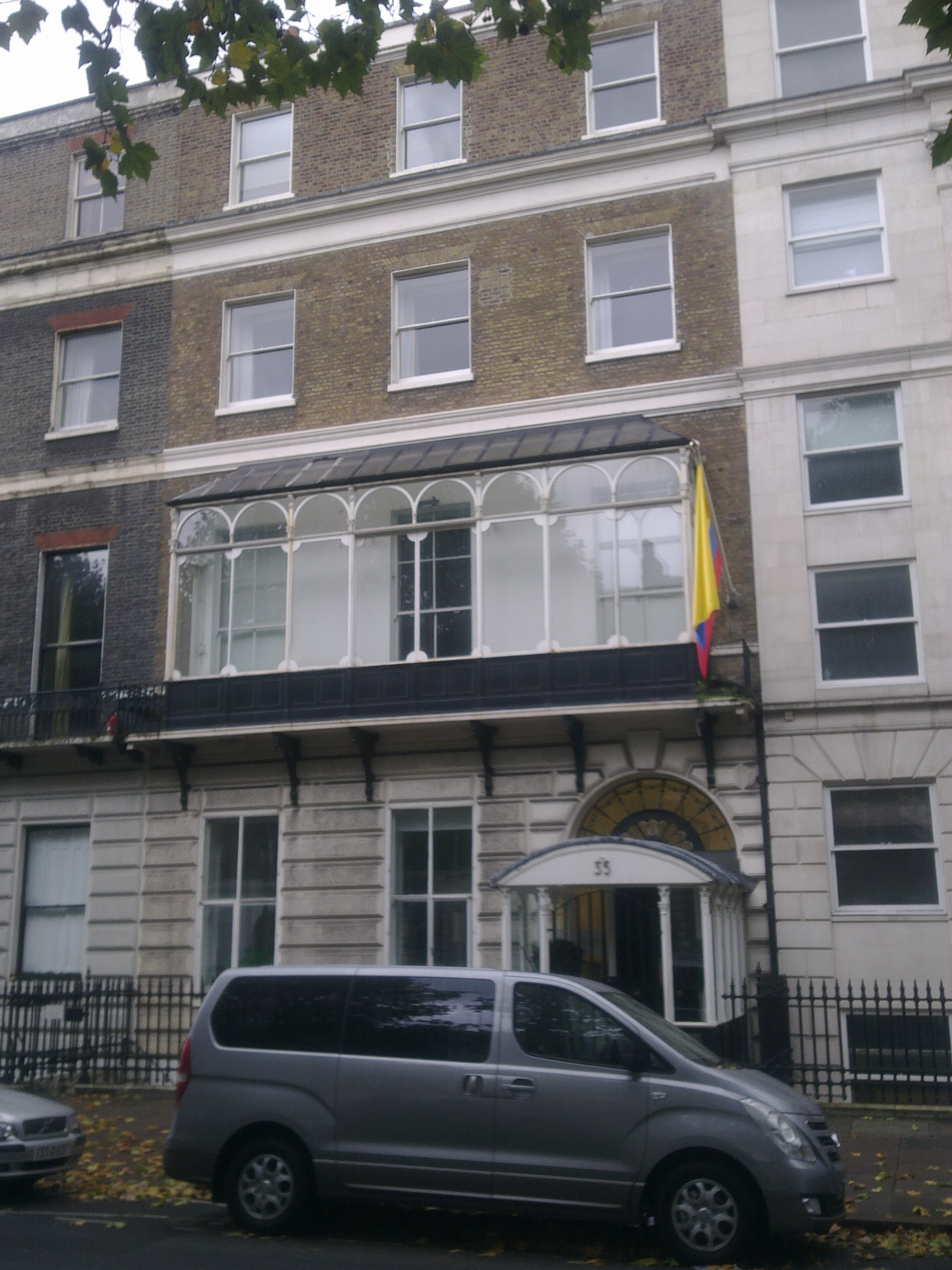
Consulate-General of Colombia in London

== See also ==
- Andean Countries–United Kingdom Trade Agreement
- Latin America–United Kingdom relations
- Colombians in the United Kingdom
- Foreign relations of Colombia
- Foreign relations of the United Kingdom
- Right-wing paramilitarism in Colombia
- British intervention in Spanish American independence
