= Economy of Central America =

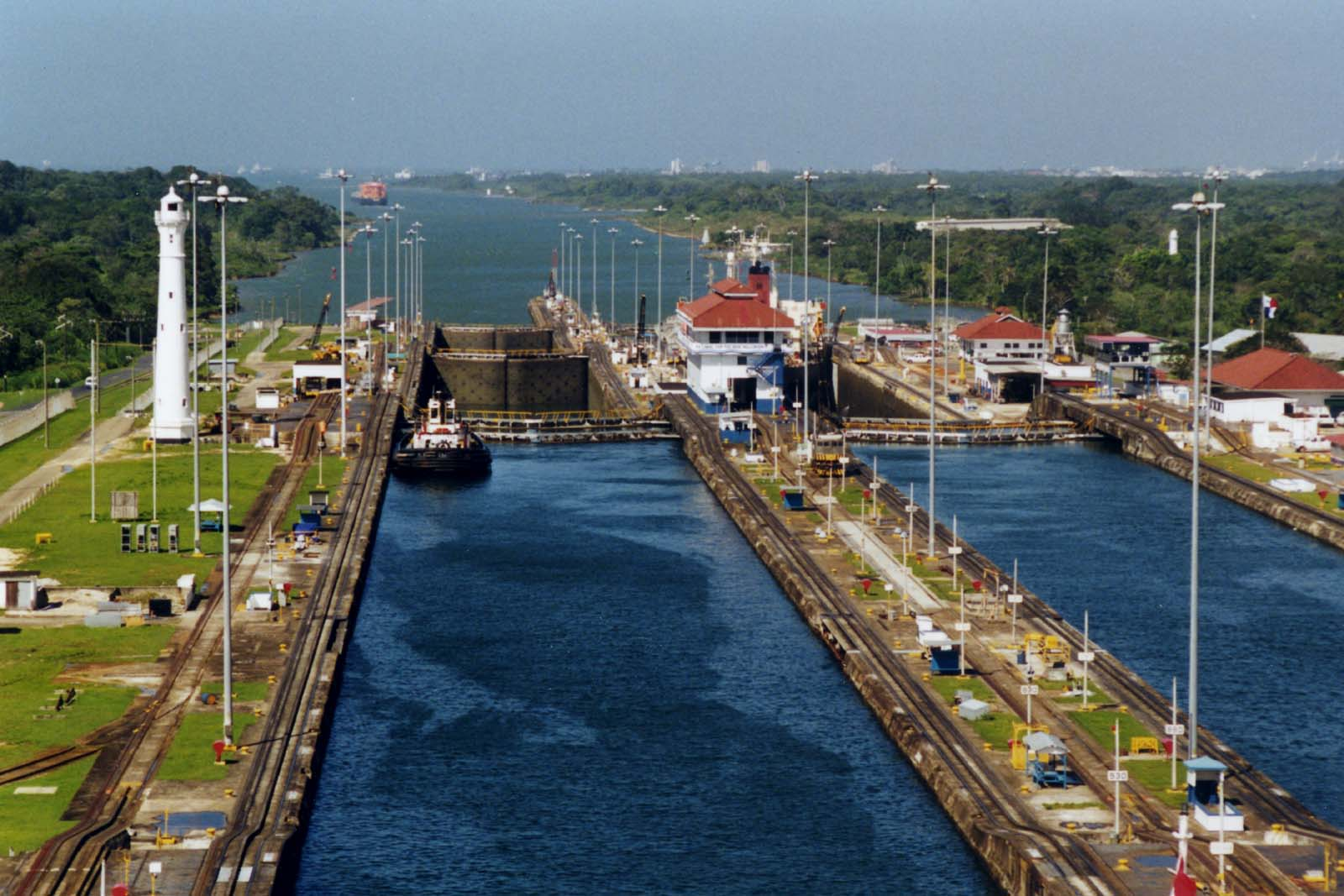
The Panama Canal is the principal trade route between Central America and the world

Development of real GDP per capita of economies in Central America

The economy of Central America is the eleventh-largest economy in Latin America, behind Brazil, Mexico, Argentina and Colombia. According to the World Bank, the nominal GDP of Central America reached 204 billion US dollar in 2010, as recovery from the crisis of 2009, where gross domestic product (GDP) suffered a decline to 3.8%. The major economic sectors are agriculture and tourism, although the industrial sector has shown strong growth, mainly in Panama.

The U.S. is the main socio-commercial partner of all Central American countries. Other important socio-commercial countries in Central America are the European Union, Japan, Dominican Republic and Mexico. Currently, the Central American bloc is based on a bilateral free trade agreement (FTA) with the United States known as CAFTA-DR, and another in negotiations with Peru. The Panama Canal is the connection of Central America with the rest of the world, and the main means of communication for trade with Central America, South America, United States, Europe and Asia.

The economic development of Central America is the middle level, although competitiveness is remarkable:

- Guatemala: Is the largest economy in Central America and the tenth largest in Latin America, based on nominal GDP ($118,655 million) and GDP purchasing power parity (PPP) of $81.51 billion (2013 data). It maintains strong commercial relations mainly with the United States, Mexico, Taiwan, Dominican Republic, Germany and Korea. According to the International Monetary Fund, Guatemala has a stable economy. Guatemala has one of the lowest GDP per capita in the region
- Panama: Besides having the highest Human Development Index (HDI) in the region, Panama is the fastest growing economy in Latin America, having grown 6.2% in 2014. Panama has the highest GDP per capita in the region. Panama is recognized as the most industrial country in Central America, and the second in Latin America after Chile. It has strong business relationships and treaties with the United States, China, Colombia, Costa Rica, Japan and Singapore.
- Costa Rica: Has the third-largest in the region and has more trade relations than many Central American countries, mainly with the United States, Singapore, the European Union, Mexico, Chile, China, CARICOM (Caribbean Community), among others countries. Politically, Costa Rica is the most stable country in Central America.
- El Salvador: According to the World Bank, El Salvador is the fourth-largest economy in the region, and has a GDP PPP of $50,903 million. The Salvadoran economy grew by 3% in 2010, after a strong contraction in 2009.
- Honduras: Is the second-poorest country in Central America, with 60% living in poverty according to the CIA World Factbook. In percentage, Honduras has the largest cheap labor in Central America, its economy is mainly agricultural, the main export products are rice, coffee, bananas, vegetables, and other products.
- Nicaragua: Is the least stable country in the region, and the second-poorest in the hemisphere after Haiti. Nicaragua has the lowest HDI in the region, and has the lowest minimum wage in Central America (US$141). Nicaragua receives financial assistance as 4 out of 10 people live on less than a dollar a day, according to the United Nations Development Programme. Nicaragua is integrated into the Bolivarian Alliance for the Peoples of Our America (ALBA).

== Currency by country ==
Each country has its own national currency, with the exception of El Salvador, where the US dollar was taken as currency in the country as of January 1, 2001, replacing the Salvadoran colón. El Salvador will also make Bitcoin an official currency beginning on September 7, 2021. Belize is a country where the dollar circulates, but of Belizean type. In the case of Panama, two types of currency are in use, the Panamanian balboa and the US dollar. The Balboa is pegged to the US dollar 1:1, is issued only in coin form, and is subdivided into 100 centésimos. For all practical purposes the currency of Panama is the US dollar.

Countries	Official Currency
Belize	Belizean dollar
Costa Rica	Colón
El Salvador	US Dollar and Bitcoin
Guatemala	Quetzal
Honduras	Lempira
Nicaragua	Córdoba
Panama	Balboa and US dollar

== Gross domestic product by country (2012) ==
Guatemala has the highest gross domestic product in Central America, followed by Panama, Costa Rica and El Salvador. The GDP data are based on data from the World Bank corresponding to 2012. The rates of economic growth come from the CIA World Factbook.

Countries	GDP PPP	GDP PPP per capita	nominal GDP	nominal GDP per capita	Economic growth (%)
Belize	$2,754,000,000	$8,412	$1,520,000,000	$4,481	+3.00
Costa Rica	$58,599,000,000	$12,558	$44,884,000,000	$9,500	+5.10
El Salvador	$45,980,000,000	$7,734	$23,985,000,000	$4,108	+1.90
Guatemala	$78,419,000,000	$5,191	$50,296,000,000	$3,330	+3.30
Honduras	$37,670,000,000	$4,593	$18,180,000,000	$2,185	+3.30
Nicaragua	$19,894,000,000	$3,336	$7,828,000,000	$1,291	+4.10
Panama	$67,804,000,000	$17,830	$36,252,500,000	$9,534	+10.00

== Exports and imports ==
Regarding exports and imports, the balance is negative in the region, each country consumes more than it produces. The main products that the region exports are agricultural type (cocoa, coffee, rice, flowers, etc.), the largest purchaser is the United States. While on the other hand, the region imports nontraditional products (cars, appliances, electronics, etc.) and the main seller is United States.

Countries	Imports of goods and services (2010)	Exports of goods and services (2010)	Balance
Panama	$25,232,000,000	$18,106,000,000	+$835,000,000
Costa Rica	$14,010,000,000	$12,120,000,000	+$120,000,000
El Salvador	$8,234,000,000	$9,333,000,000	+$135,000,000
Guatemala	$8,135,000,000	$8,957,000,000	+$130,000,000
Honduras	$7,235,000,000	$7,002,000,000	+$96,300,000
Nicaragua	$4,723,000,000	$3,366,000,000	+$100,500,000

== Foreign direct investment ==
According to the World Bank, Panama, Costa Rica and Guatemala are the countries that receive more foreign direct investment in Central America, and exceeded one billion US dollars. The next table shows the values in dollars, and investment growth between 2010 and 2014:

Countries	Foreign investment (2010)	Foreign investment (2011)	Foreign investment (2012)	Foreign investment (2013)	Foreign investment (2014)
Belize	$96,449,877	$95,348,525	$194,201,409	$92,247,731	$141,097,030
Costa Rica	$1,850,664,231	$2,141,615,128	$2,692,160,896	$3,284,494,667	$2,345,257,533
El Salvador	$113,160,684	$122,500,004	$447,709,564	$242,345,997	$474,801,761
Guatemala	$845,598,200	$1,139,659,133	$1,263,638,429	$1,353,141,908	$1,204,670,350
Honduras	$484,836,873	$1,042,571,021	$1,067,550,208	$1,069,029,263	—
Nicaragua	$489,900,000	$936,300,000	$767,658,534	$815,500,000	$840,000,000
Panama	$2,549,100,000	$4,395,600,000	$3,297,100,000	$5,053,200,000	$5,213,800,000

== Banking ==
Banking is one of the main economic activities in Central America, which takes place mainly in Panama, El Salvador and Costa Rica. Since 2010, Guatemala, Honduras and Nicaragua have developed strong growth of the banking. Regarding financial centers, El Salvador and Panama are the only Central American countries that have a World Trade Center.

The economist magazine American Economy published its ranking "The 250 best banks in Latin America," presented the list of the 42 Central American banks included.

Within the Latin American general ranking, the first Central American Bank is the number 39 in the list, and it is the HSBC Panama in Panama City.

Within the first 100 places in the general ranking of Amperica Economy, 7 Central banks appears: HSBC Panama ranked 39th, General of Panama at 42, National Panama (57), National of Costa Rica (70), Bladex of Panama (75), Agricultural Bank of El Salvador (85) and Costa Rica Bank of Costa Rica (92).

== See also ==
- Central America
- Central America–European Union Association Agreement
- Central America–United Kingdom Association Agreement
- Economic history of Latin America
