= Nicaragua–United Kingdom relations =

- Nicaragua: United Kingdom

Diplomatic mission
- Embassy of Nicaragua, London: Embassy of the United Kingdom, San Jose

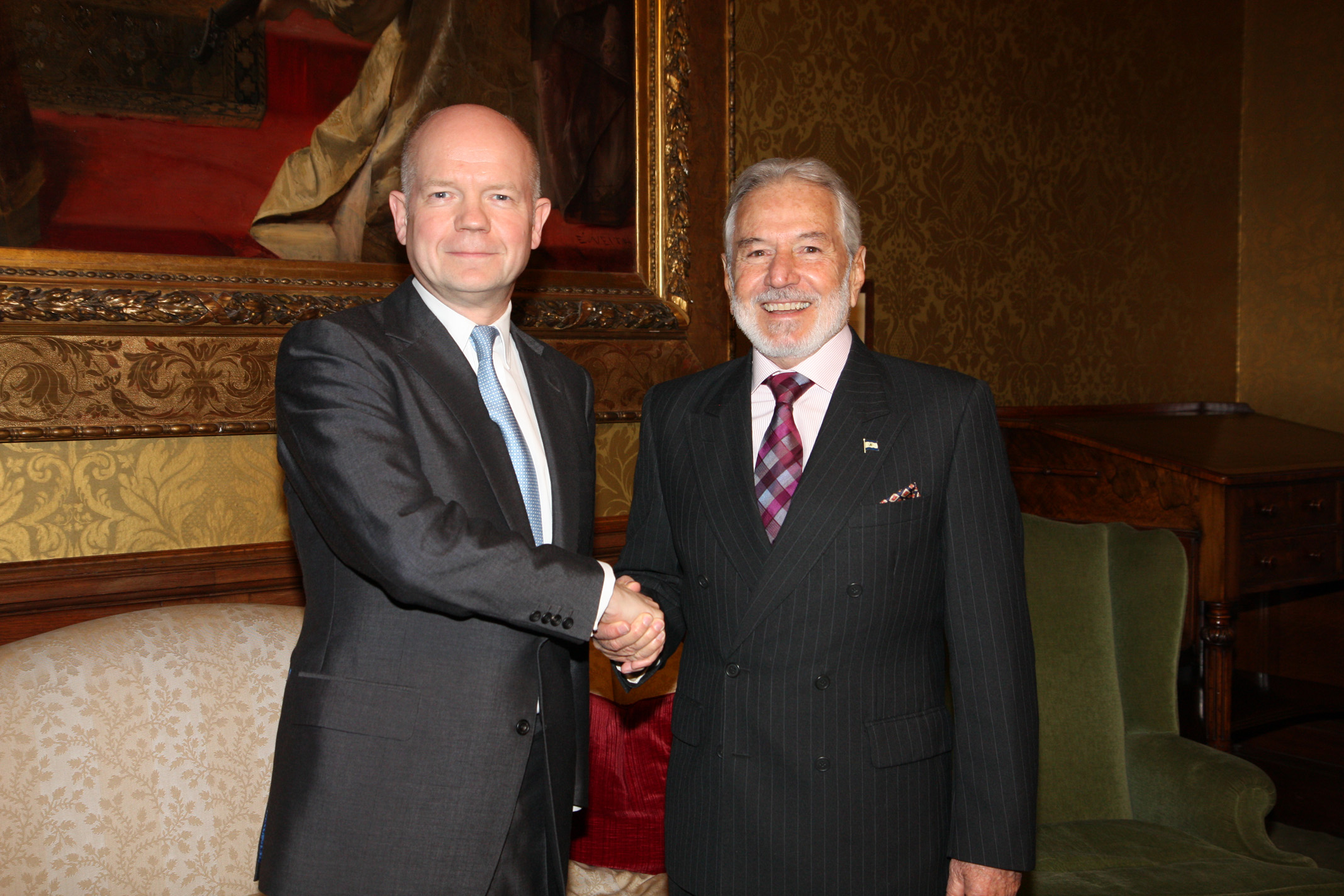
British Foreign Secretary William Hague with Nicaraguan Foreign Minister Samuel Santos López in London, November 2013.

Nicaragua–United Kingdom relations are the foreign and bilateral relations between the Republic of Nicaragua and the United Kingdom of Great Britain and Northern Ireland. Relations between the two countries are primarily governed by the Central America–United Kingdom Association Agreement.

== History ==
The UK governed the Mosquito Coast from 1638 to 1787 and 1816 to 1819.

== Economic relations ==
On 4 December 1996, Nicaragua and the United Kingdom signed an investment agreement, which entered into force on 21 December 2001.

From 1 August 2013 until 30 December 2020, trade between Nicaragua and the UK was governed by the Central America–European Union Association Agreement, while the United Kingdom was a member of the European Union.

Following the withdrawal of the United Kingdom from the European Union, the UK and Nicaragua signed the Central America–United Kingdom Association Agreement on 18 July 2019. The Central America–United Kingdom Association Agreement is a continuity trade agreement, based on the EU free trade agreement, which entered into force on 1 January 2021. Trade value between Central America and the United Kingdom was worth £2,624 million in 2022.

== Diplomatic missions ==
- Nicaragua maintains an embassy in London.
- The United Kingdom is accredited to Nicaragua from its embassy in San Jose, Costa Rica; there is no British embassy in Nicaragua.

== See also ==
- Foreign relations of Nicaragua
- Foreign relations of the United Kingdom
- Latin America–United Kingdom relations
