= Greenup =

Greenup may refer to:

== People ==
- Greenup (surname)

== Places ==
- Greenup, Illinois, a village in Cumberland County
- Greenup, Kentucky, a city in Greenup County
- Greenup County, Kentucky

== See also ==
- Green Up Day
