= Andean Countries–United Kingdom Trade Agreement =

Free trade agreement signed in 2019

Trade Agreement between the United Kingdom of Great Britain and Northern Ireland, of the one part, and the Republic of Colombia, the Republic of Ecuador and the Republic of Peru, of the other part
- Andean Countries United Kingdom
- Type: Free Trade Agreement and Economic Integration Agreement
- Context: Trade Continuity Agreement between the Andean Countries and the United Kingdom
- Signed: 15 May 2019
- Location: Quito, Ecuador
- Effective: 1 January 2021
- Negotiators: Laura Valdivieso; Pablo José Campana Sáenz; Edgar Manuel Vásquez Vela; Katherine Ward
- Parties: Colombia; Ecuador; Peru; United Kingdom
- Depositary: Government of the United Kingdom
- Languages: English; Spanish

The Andean Countries–United Kingdom Trade Agreement is a free trade agreement between the United Kingdom and the Andean Countries—Colombia, Ecuador, and Peru. The agreement is a Trade Continuity Agreement that governs trade and broader cooperation between the Andean Countries and the United Kingdom following the UK's withdrawal from the European Union.

== History ==
From 11 November 2016 until 30 December 2020, trade between Ecuador and the UK was governed by the Colombia, Ecuador and Peru–European Union Trade Agreement, while the United Kingdom was a member of the European Union.

Following the withdrawal of the United Kingdom from the European Union, the United Kingdom and Colombia, Ecuador, and Peru signed the Andean Countries–United Kingdom Trade Agreement on 15 May 2019. The Andean Countries–United Kingdom Trade Agreement is a continuity trade agreement, based on the EU free trade agreement, which entered into force on 1 January 2021. Trade value between the Andean countries states and the United Kingdom was worth £5,815 million in 2022.

== Colombia ==
Colombia was not able to ratify the free trade agreement by 1 January 2021 and could not provisionally apply the agreement. Through the exchange of diplomatic notes the United Kingdom and Colombia agreed to a bridging mechanism arrangement, which was signed on 18 October 2019, allowing the two countries to continue to trading on preferential terms until Colombia could complete its domestic procedures to fully ratify the agreement. Colombia ratified the agreement on 21 April 2022 and the UK-Andean countries free trade agreement entered into force on 28 June 2022 for Colombia.

== See also ==
- Colombia–United Kingdom relations
- Economy of Colombia
- Economy of Ecuador
- Economy of Peru
- Economy of the United Kingdom
- Ecuador–United Kingdom relations
- Free trade agreements of the European Union
- Free trade agreements of the United Kingdom
- Peru–United Kingdom relations
