= Greenup (surname) =

Greenup is a surname of English origin. Notable people with the surname include:

- Albert William Greenup (1866–1952), English Hebraist
- Arthur Greenup (1915–1980), Australian politician
- Christopher Greenup (1750–1818), American lawyer and politician
- Mary Greenup (1789–1846), British-Colombian businessperson
- William C. Greenup, American politician
