= Arnaldo Castillo (politician) =

Honduran politician

Arnaldo Castillo is a Honduran politician. He serves as Honduras's Minister of Economic Development. He specializes in the fields of manufacturing, risk management, strategic planning, and trade policies. Despite his skills in economics, he graduated as an electrician from the Republic of China Air Force Academy.
