= Peru–United Kingdom relations =

Diplomatic relations between Peru and the United Kingdom

- Peru: United Kingdom

Diplomatic mission
- Embassy of Peru, London: British Embassy, Lima

Peru–United Kingdom relations (Spanish: Relaciones Perú y Reino Unido) refers to the bilateral relations between the Republic of Peru and the United Kingdom of Great Britain and Northern Ireland. Relations between both countries date back to the British intervention in the Peruvian War of Independence.

In 2022, the elimination of the travel visa was announced from November 9 for short stays for Peruvians traveling to the United Kingdom. As of 2022, British in Peru represent 0.13% of immigrants, with 1,788 British recorded as living in the country.

The British-Peruvian Cultural Association is the foremost British cultural centre in Peru.

Both countries share common membership of CPTPP and the Andean Countries–United Kingdom Trade Agreement.

== History ==
Both countries began their diplomatic relations in 1823 with the appointment of Thomas Edward Rowcroft as Consul General in Peru, who arrived aboard the HMS Cambridge on the same year. In the 1830s, half of Peru's imports came from the United Kingdom. Throughout the republican period, Peru had the presence of prominent English commercial institutions; among them the Peruvian Railway Company, the Pacific Steam Navigation Company, the W. R. Grace and Company and the Anthony Gibbs & Sons.

During the War of the Confederation, the British government acted as guarantor of the 1837 Treaty of Paucarpata. When the treaty was annulled, the Consul General notified the Chilean government of Queen Victoria's disapproval of the continuation of the war. Then chargé d'affaires Belford Hinton Wilson made demands to guarantee the safety of British goods in Lima, which were later moved to Callao.

During the Liberal Revolution of 1854, a civil conflict between two factions, one led by President José Rufino Echenique and the other by Ramón Castilla, the British chargé d'affaires' house served as the refuge for the former's troops after they were defeated at the battle that ended the conflict.

The British embassy in Lima is located at the Torre Parque Mar, a building next to the Costa Verde of Miraflores District. It moved there in 2002, having previously occupied a series of locations after moving from their original legation in Monterrico.

On February 24, 2022, in response to the Russian occupation of Ukraine, the British ambassador's residence flew the flag of Ukraine in support of the Slavic country. After the death of Elizabeth II, the residence flew its national flag at half-mast, later flying it at full mast until the coronation of Charles III.

== High-level visits ==
High-level visits from Peru to the United Kingdom

- President Manuel Prado (1949 & 1960)
- President Alberto Fujimori (1997)
- Foreign Minister Ana Gervasi (2023)

High-level visits from the United Kingdom to Peru

- Edward, Prince of Wales (1931)
- Albert, Duke of York (1931)
- Princess Marina, Duchess of Kent (1959)
- Princess Alexandra of Kent (1959)
- Prince Philip, Duke of Edinburgh (1962)
- Anne, Princess Royal (1997, 2007 & 2017)
- Foreign Office Minister Jeremy Browne (2012)
- Foreign Secretary Boris Johnson (2018)
- Minister for Exports Mike Freer (2021)
- Sophie, Duchess of Edinburgh (2025)

== Trade ==
The United Kingdom and Peru had a continuity trade agreement through the Free Trade Agreement between Peru and the European Union, which entered into force on March 1, 2013. On May 15, 2019, Peru, together with Ecuador and Colombia, signed a trade agreement with the United Kingdom in the city of Quito, which is based on the one signed with the European Union. The latter agreement came into existence due to the announcement of Brexit in 2017. In 2021, trade between both countries increased in 48% due to the new FTA. In July 2023, the United Kingdom signed the agreement to accede to the Comprehensive and Progressive Agreement for Trans-Pacific Partnership, a trade bloc of which Peru is a founding member.

== Resident diplomatic missions ==
- Peru has an embassy in London.
- The United Kingdom has an embassy in Lima.
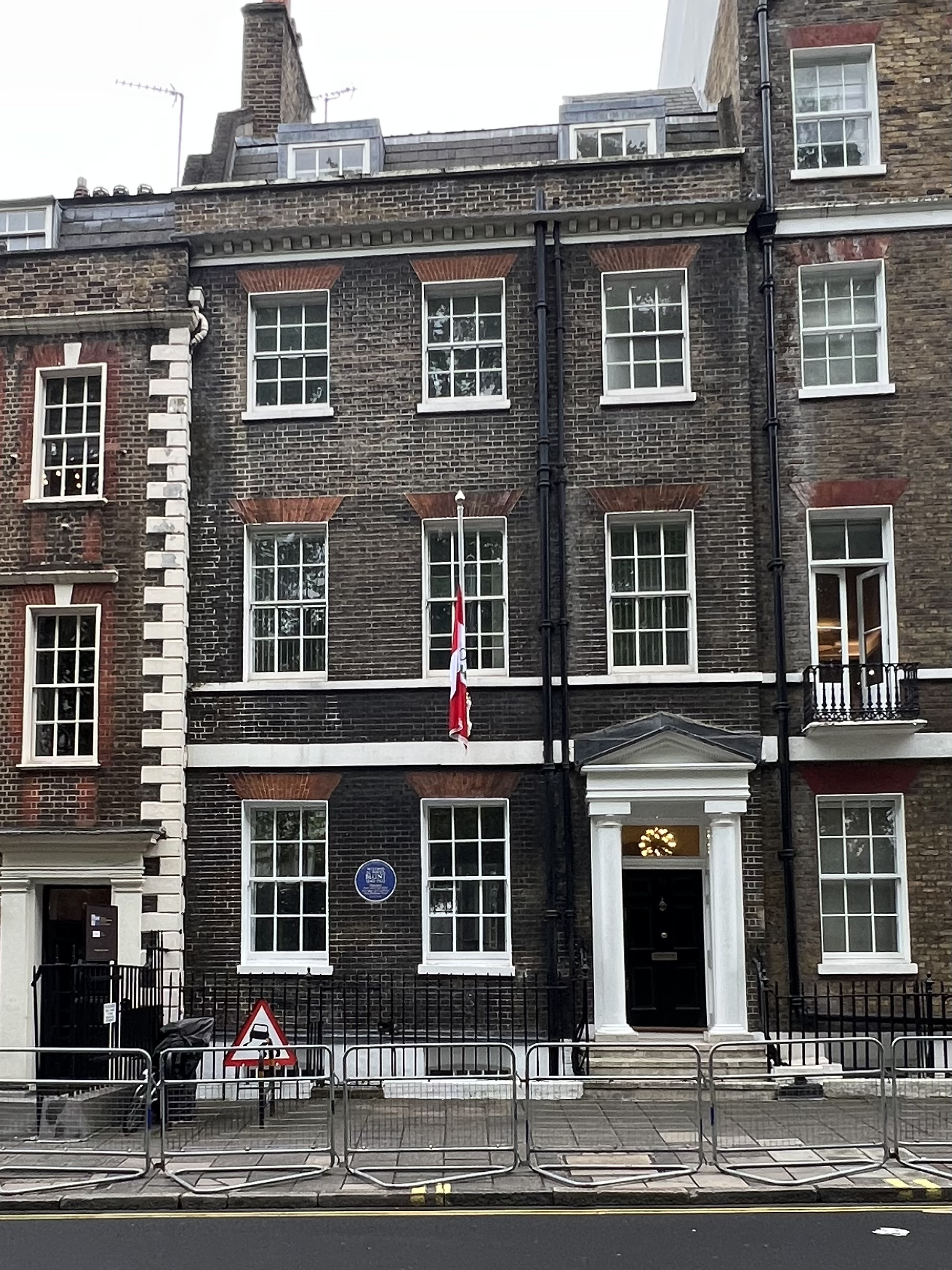
Embassy of Peru, London

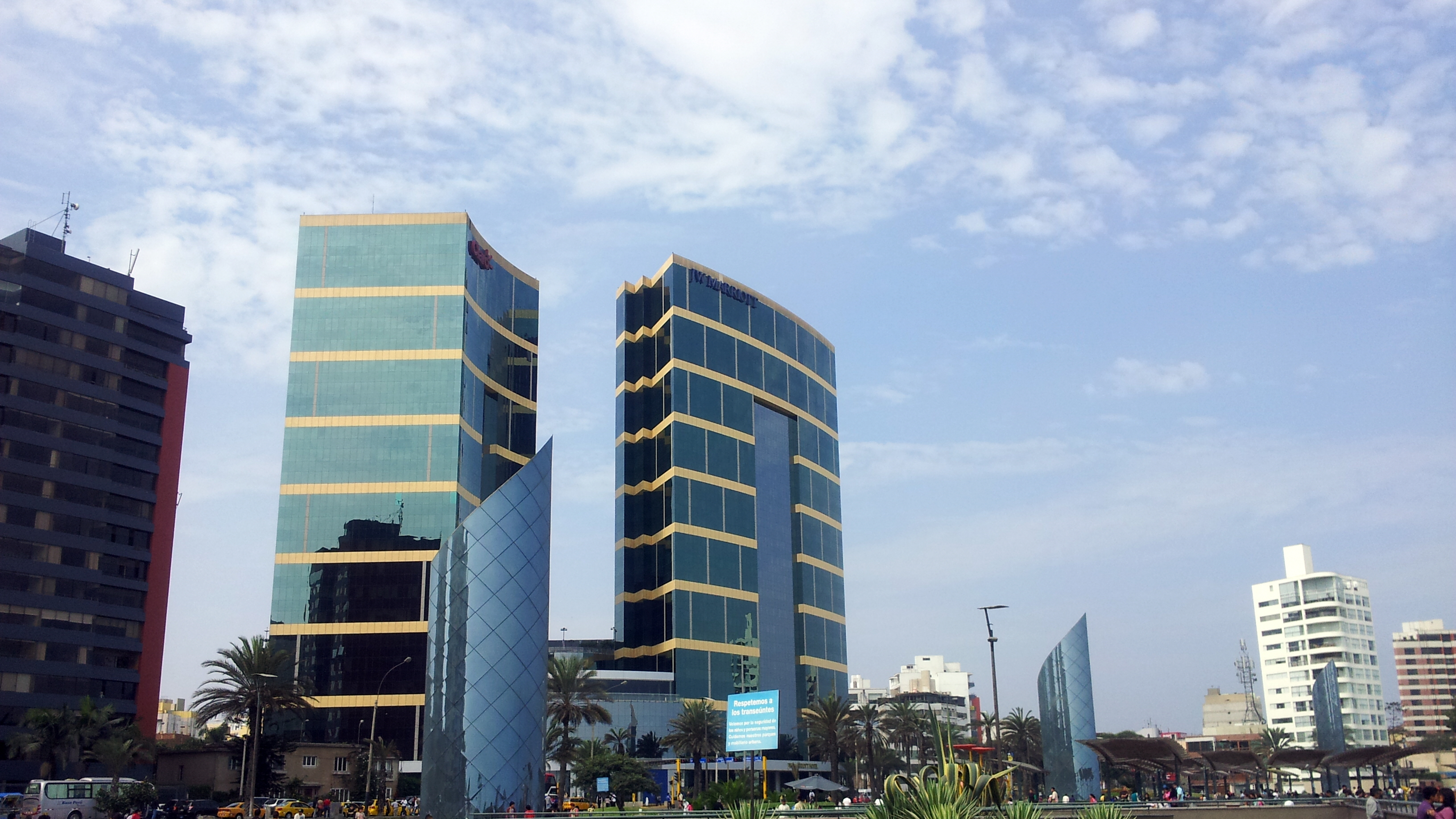
The Torre Parque Mar, which hosts the British Embassy in Lima

== See also ==
- Andean Countries–United Kingdom Trade Agreement
- British Peruvians
- Foreign relations of Peru
- Foreign relations of United Kingdom
- Peruvians in the United Kingdom
- List of ambassadors of Peru to the United Kingdom
- List of diplomats of the United Kingdom to Peru

== Bibliography ==
- Basadre Grohmann, Jorge (2014). Historia de la República del Perú [1822-1933]. Vol. 2. El Comercio. ISBN 978-612-306-353-5.
