= Guatemala–United Kingdom relations =

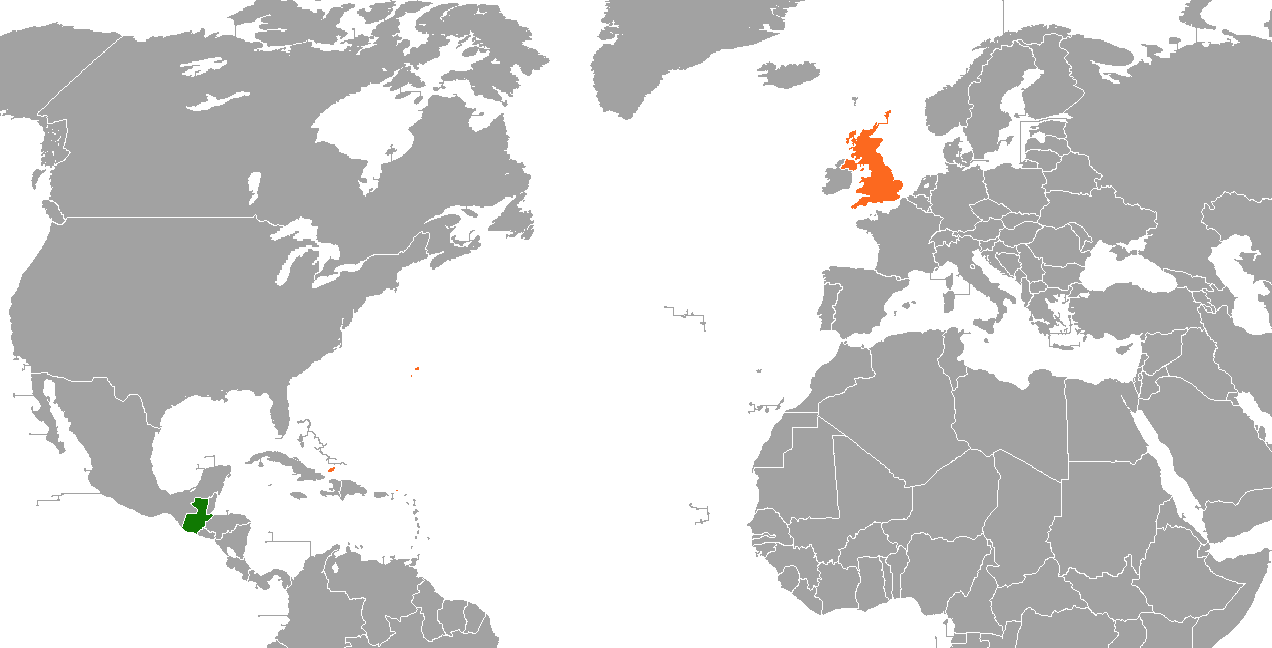

- Guatemala: United Kingdom

Diplomatic mission
- Embassy of Guatemala, London: Embassy of the United Kingdom, Guatemala City

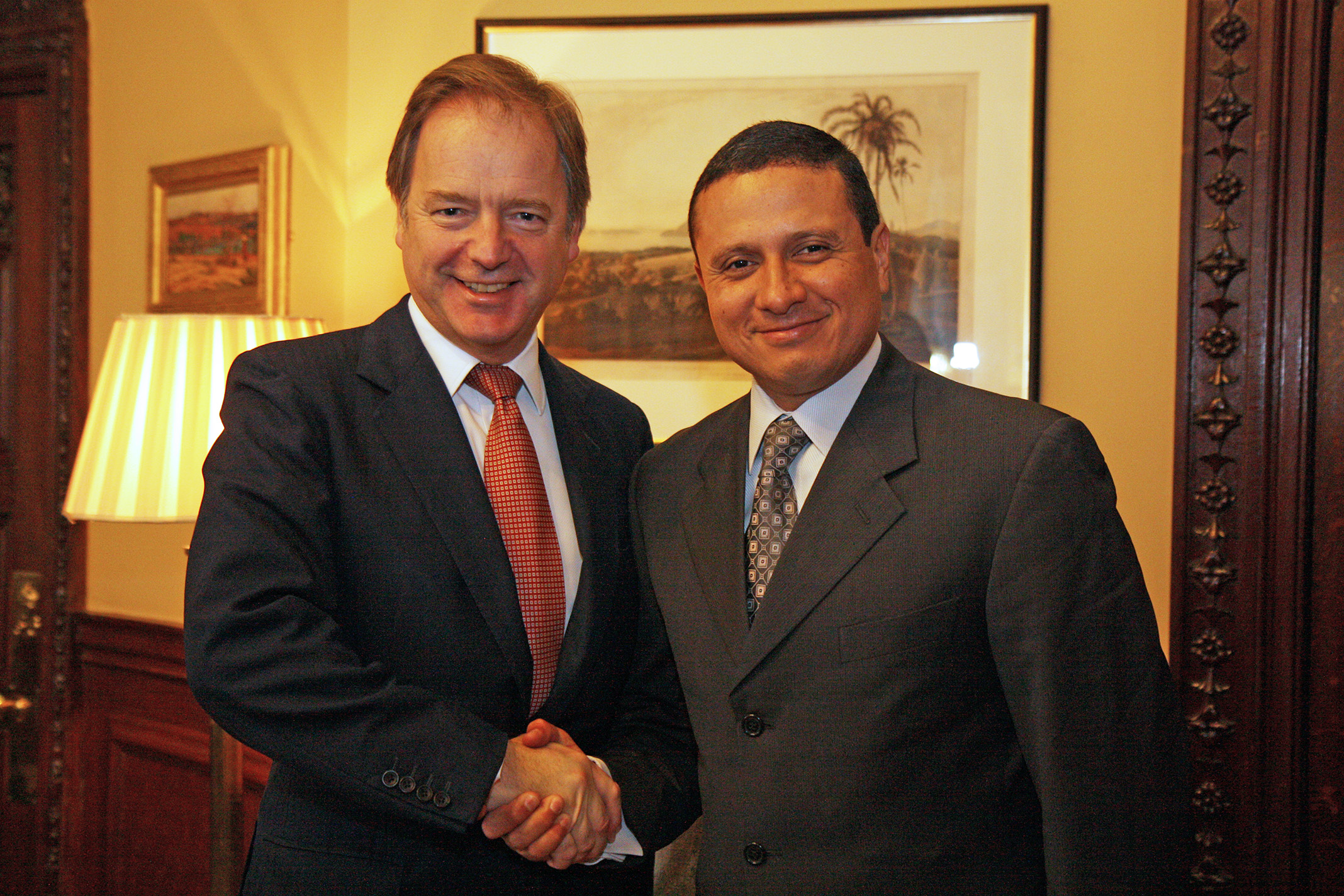
British Foreign Office Minister Hugo Swire with Guatemalan Foreign Minister Carlos Raúl Morales in London, November 2014.

Guatemala and the United Kingdom established diplomatic ties on 12 July 1837.

Both countries share common membership of the Atlantic Co-operation Pact, the International Criminal Court, and the World Trade Organization, as well as the Central America–United Kingdom Association Agreement.

== Economic relations ==
From 1 December 2013 until 30 December 2020, trade between Guatemala and the UK was governed by the Central America–European Union Association Agreement, while the United Kingdom was a member of the European Union.

Following the withdrawal of the United Kingdom from the European Union, the UK and Guatemala signed the Central America–United Kingdom Association Agreement on 18 July 2019. The Central America–United Kingdom Association Agreement is a continuity trade agreement, based on the EU free trade agreement, which entered into force on 1 January 2021. Trade value between Central America and the United Kingdom was worth £2,624 million in 2022.

== Diplomatic missions ==
- Guatemala maintains an embassy in London.
- United Kingdom is accredited to Guatemala from its embassy in Guatemala City.

== See also ==
- Central America–United Kingdom Association Agreement
- Foreign relations of Guatemala
- Foreign relations of the United Kingdom
