= El Salvador–United Kingdom relations =

- El Salvador: United Kingdom

Diplomatic mission
- Embassy of El Salvador, London: Embassy of the United Kingdom, San Salvador

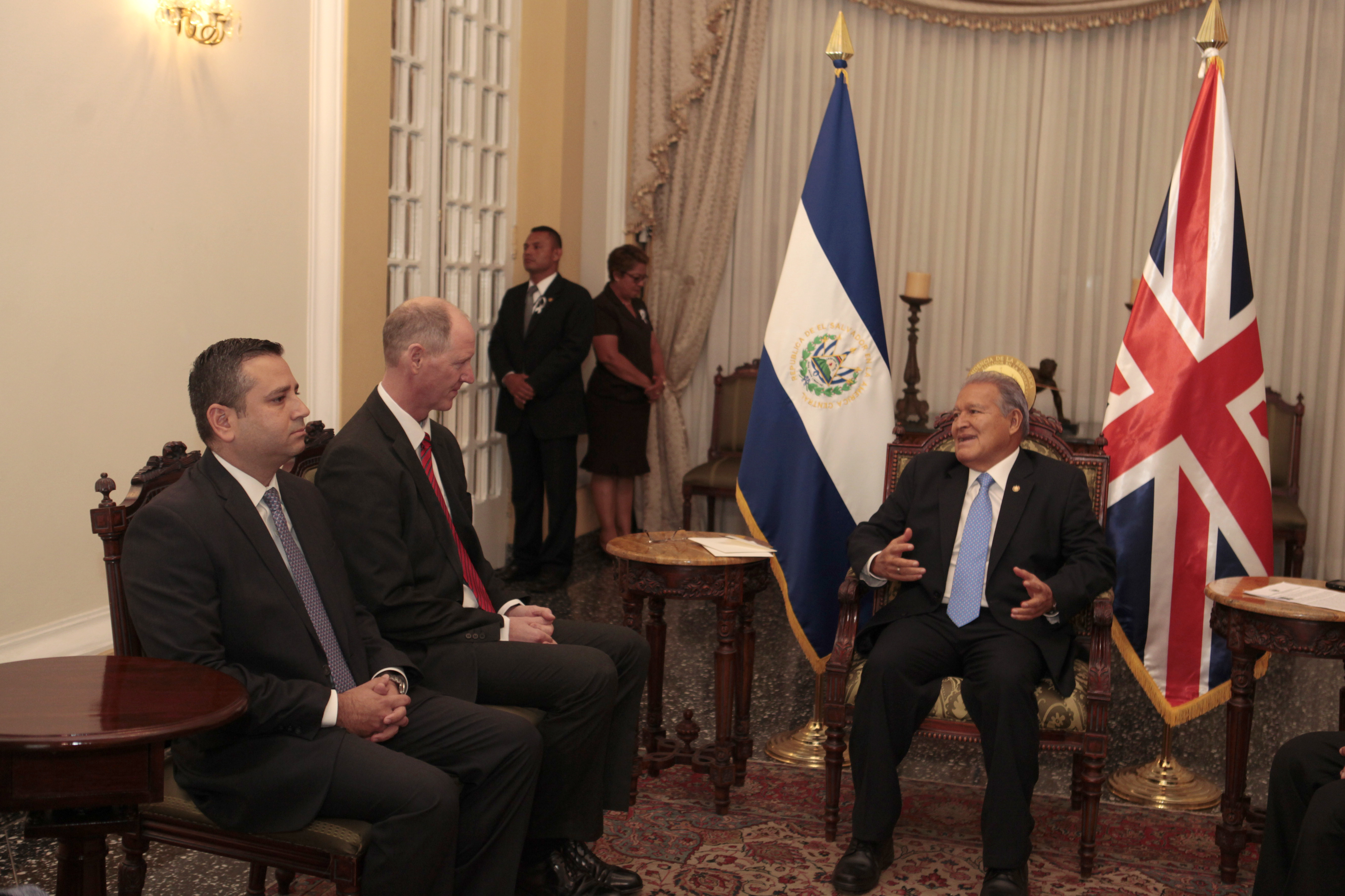
British Ambassador to El Salvador Bernhard Garside with Salvadoran President Salvador Sánchez Cerén in San Salvador, March 2015.

El Salvador and the United Kingdom established diplomatic ties in 1883.

Both countries share common membership of the International Criminal Court, the World Trade Organization, and the Central America–United Kingdom Association Agreement.

== Economic relations ==
Bilaterally the two countries have an Investment Agreement.

From 1 August 2013 until 30 December 2020, trade between El Salvador and the UK was governed by the Central America–European Union Association Agreement, while the United Kingdom was a member of the European Union.

Following the withdrawal of the United Kingdom from the European Union, the UK and El Salvador signed the Central America–United Kingdom Association Agreement on 18 July 2019. The Central America–United Kingdom Association Agreement is a continuity trade agreement, based on the EU free trade agreement, which entered into force on 1 January 2021. Trade value between Central America and the United Kingdom was worth £2,624 million in 2022.

== Diplomatic missions ==
- El Salvador maintains an embassy in London.
- The United Kingdom is accredited to El Salvador from its embassy in San Salvador.

== See also ==
- Central America–United Kingdom Association Agreement
- Foreign relations of El Salvador
- Foreign relations of the United Kingdom
