= South Atlantic Environmental Research Institute =

Coordinates: 51.6920°S 57.8615°W

South Atlantic Environmental Research Institute (SAERI)
- Established: 2012
- Chair: Peter Judge, MBE
- Head: Dr Paul Brickle (Executive Director) (Honorary Reader, School of Biological Sciences University of Aberdeen)
- Address: Stanley Cottage North, Ross Road
- Location: Stanley, Falkland Islands
- Website: https://www.south-atlantic-research.org/

The South Atlantic Environmental Research Institute (SAERI) is a research institute in the Falkland Islands. SAERI has five focal areas – Marine Science, Atmospheric Science, Freshwater Science, Terrestrial Science, Earth Science, all of which are underpinned and supported by Data Science.

SAERI was formed as a department within the Falkland Islands Government when the need for an umbrella organisation for environmental science within the Falkland Islands and the South Atlantic became evident, SAERI was officially opened by Prince Edward, Duke of Kent and Strathearn on 12 November 2012 during his visit to the Falkland Islands to mark the Diamond Jubilee. SAERI became an independent organisation in 2017; it is a Charitable Incorporated Organisation registered with the Charity Commission and entered on the register of Charities in the Falkland Islands. SAERI has a registered UK office at Falkland House in London and also an office based in Stanley, Falkland Islands.

SAERI has grown to become an institution, that in addition to research, teaches students, and builds capacity within the South Atlantic Overseas Territories. SAERI is often a focal point for scientists visiting the region, offering logistical support and local knowledge. In addition, the IMS-GIS (Information Management System and Geographic Information System) data centre based at SAERI, established central and standard systems for data management, accessibility and sharing within the South Atlantic Overseas Territories and beyond. The IMS-GIS data centre also works with other islands and territories that have similar data needs and challenges. A data catalogue is hosted on the SAERI website.

== SAERI (Falklands) Limited ==
SAERI (the Charitable Incorporated Organisation) is a 100% shareholder in SAERI (Falklands) Limited. SAERI (Falklands) Limited currently operates as a small environmental consultancy. This work has included environmental impact assessments.

== See also ==
- Falklands Conservation
- British Antarctic Survey
- Joint Nature Conservation Committee
- Darwin Initiative
