= Ecuador–United Kingdom relations =

- Ecuador: United Kingdom

Diplomatic mission
- Embassy of Ecuador, London: Embassy of the United Kingdom, Quito

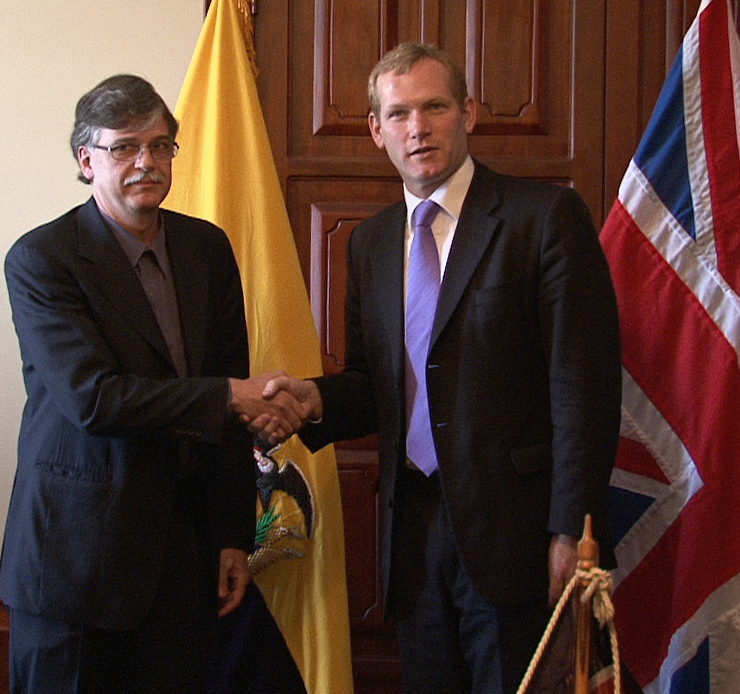
Acting Ecuadorian Foreign Minister Kintto Lucas with British Foreign Office Minister Jeremy Browne in Quito, July 2011.

Ecuador–United Kingdom relations encompass the diplomatic, economic, and historical interactions between the Republic of Ecuador and the United Kingdom of Great Britain and Northern Ireland. Both countries established diplomatic relations on 29 January 1853.

Both countries share common membership of the International Criminal Court, the United Nations, and the World Trade Organization, as well as the Andean Countries–United Kingdom Trade Agreement. Bilaterally the two countries have a Double Taxation Agreement.

== Economic relations ==
From 11 November 2016 until 30 December 2020, trade between Ecuador and the UK was governed by the Colombia, Ecuador and Peru–European Union Trade Agreement, while the United Kingdom was a member of the European Union.

Following the withdrawal of the United Kingdom from the European Union, the United Kingdom and Colombia, Ecuador, and Peru signed the Andean Countries–United Kingdom Trade Agreement on 15 May 2019. The Andean Countries–United Kingdom Trade Agreement is a continuity trade agreement, based on the EU free trade agreement, which entered into force on 1 January 2021. Trade value between the Andean countries states and the United Kingdom was worth £5,815 million in 2022.

== Diplomatic missions ==
- Ecuador maintains an embassy in London.
- The United Kingdom is accredited to Ecuador through its embassy in Quito.

== See also ==
- Andean Countries–United Kingdom Trade Agreement
- Foreign relations of Ecuador
- Foreign relations of the United Kingdom
