= Elizabeth Masson =

Elizabeth Masson (1805 – 9 January 1865) was an English mezzo-soprano singer and composer. She was born in England and studied singing with Mrs. Henry Smart and Giuditta Pasta in Italy. She made her debut at Ella's Second Subscription concert in 1831, and sang regularly at Philharmonic Society Concerts. She later worked as a singing teacher and composed songs, publishing a collection. She founded the Royal Society of Female Musicians in 1839, and died in London.

== Works ==
Selected works include:

- Ah, love was never yet without the pang (Text: George Gordon Noel Byron, Lord Byron)
- Stars of the summer night (Text: Henry Wadsworth Longfellow)
- Serenade (Text: Sir William M Davenant, 1621)
