= Costa Rica–United Kingdom relations =

- Costa Rica: United Kingdom

Diplomatic mission
- Embassy of Costa Rica, London: Embassy of the United Kingdom, San José

Costa Rica and the United Kingdom have established diplomatic and trade relationships.

The two countries officially established diplomatic ties in 1848. Frederick Chatfield was the British consul in Central America at the time.

Costa Rica and the United Kingdom are both parties to the Central America–United Kingdom Association Agreement, a treaty and trade agreement.

== History ==
On November 27, 1849, the two countries signed the Treaty of Friendship, Commerce, and Navigation between Great Britain and Costa Rica. The treaty went into effect on February 20, 1850.

== Agreements ==
In 1887, the two countries signed the Convention with the Postal Administration of the Republic of Costa Rica for the exchange of postal parcels, with Detailed Regulations.

In 1907, the two countries signed the Agreement between the United Kingdom and the Republic of Costa Rica for the Exchange of Postal Money Orders.

In 1921, the two countries signed the Exchange of Notes between Great Britain and Costa Rica relative to the Importation from Great Britain into Costa Rica of Opium and similar Drugs.

In 1922, the two countries signed the Convention between Her Majesty's Government and the Government of Costa Rica for the Submission to Arbitration of Certain Claims against the Government of Costa Rica.

In 1928, the two countries signed the Convention between His Majesty's Government in the United Kingdom and the Government of Costa Rica respecting Commercial Travellers.

In 1933, the two countries signed the Exchange of Notes between the Government of the Irish Free State and the Costa Rican Government in regard to Commercial Relations.

In 1950, the two countries signed the Agreement between Canada and Costa Rica.

In 1968, the two countries signed the Exchange of Notes between the Government of the United Kingdom of Great Britain and Northern Ireland and the Government of the Republic of Costa Rica concerning the Abolition of Visas.

In 1975, the two countries signed the Exchange of Notes between the Government of the United Kingdom of Great Britain and Northern Ireland and the Government of the Republic of Costa Rica further amending the United Kingdom / Costa Rica Loan 1973.

== Economic relations ==
On 4 December 1996, Costa Rica and the United Kingdom signed an investment agreement, the agreement was not been brought into effective.

From 1 August 2013 until 30 December 2020, trade between Costa Rica and the UK was governed by the Central America–European Union Association Agreement, while the United Kingdom was a member of the European Union. Following the withdrawal of the United Kingdom from the European Union, the UK and Costa Rica signed a continuity trade agreement on 18 July 2019, based on the EU free trade agreement; the agreement entered into force on 1 January 2021. Trade value between Central America and the United Kingdom was worth £2,624 million in 2022.

On 29 November 2024, Costa Rica was invited to open negotiations to join Comprehensive and Progressive Agreement for Trans-Pacific Partnership, a trade bloc of which the United Kingdom is a member.

== Diplomatic missions ==
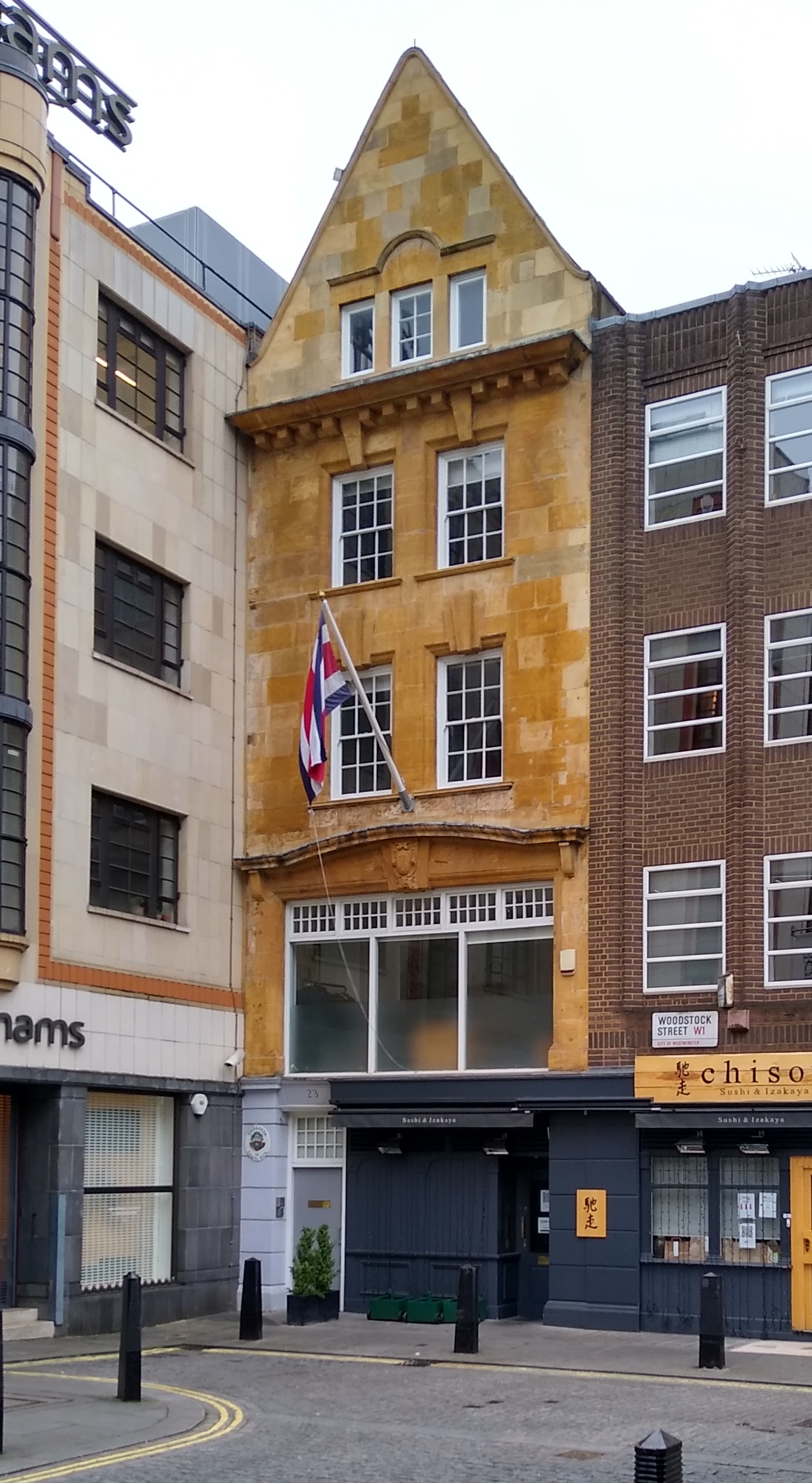
Embassy of Costa Rica in London

Costa Rica has an embassy in London. The mission was raised to the status of embassy in 1956, having previously been a legation.

María del Carmen Gutiérrez Chamberlain de Chittenden, ambassador from 1962, was the first woman ambassador accredited to the Court of St James's.

The United Kingdom has an embassy in San José.

== List of ambassadors ==
=== Ministers ===
- 1876?: Francisco María Iglesias Llorente
- 1882 to 1887: León Fernández Bonilla (non-resident)
- 1887 to 1898: Manuel María de Peralta y Alfaro (resident in Paris)
- 1913 to 1919: Wenceslao de la Guardia y Fábrega
- 1950?: Luis Dobles Segreda (resident in?)
- 1954 to 1956: Virginia Prestinary de Gallegos

== See also ==
- Central America–United Kingdom Association Agreement
- Foreign relations of Costa Rica
- Foreign relations of the United Kingdom
