= Panama–United Kingdom relations =

- Panama: United Kingdom

Diplomatic mission
- Embassy of Panama, London: Embassy of the United Kingdom, Panama City

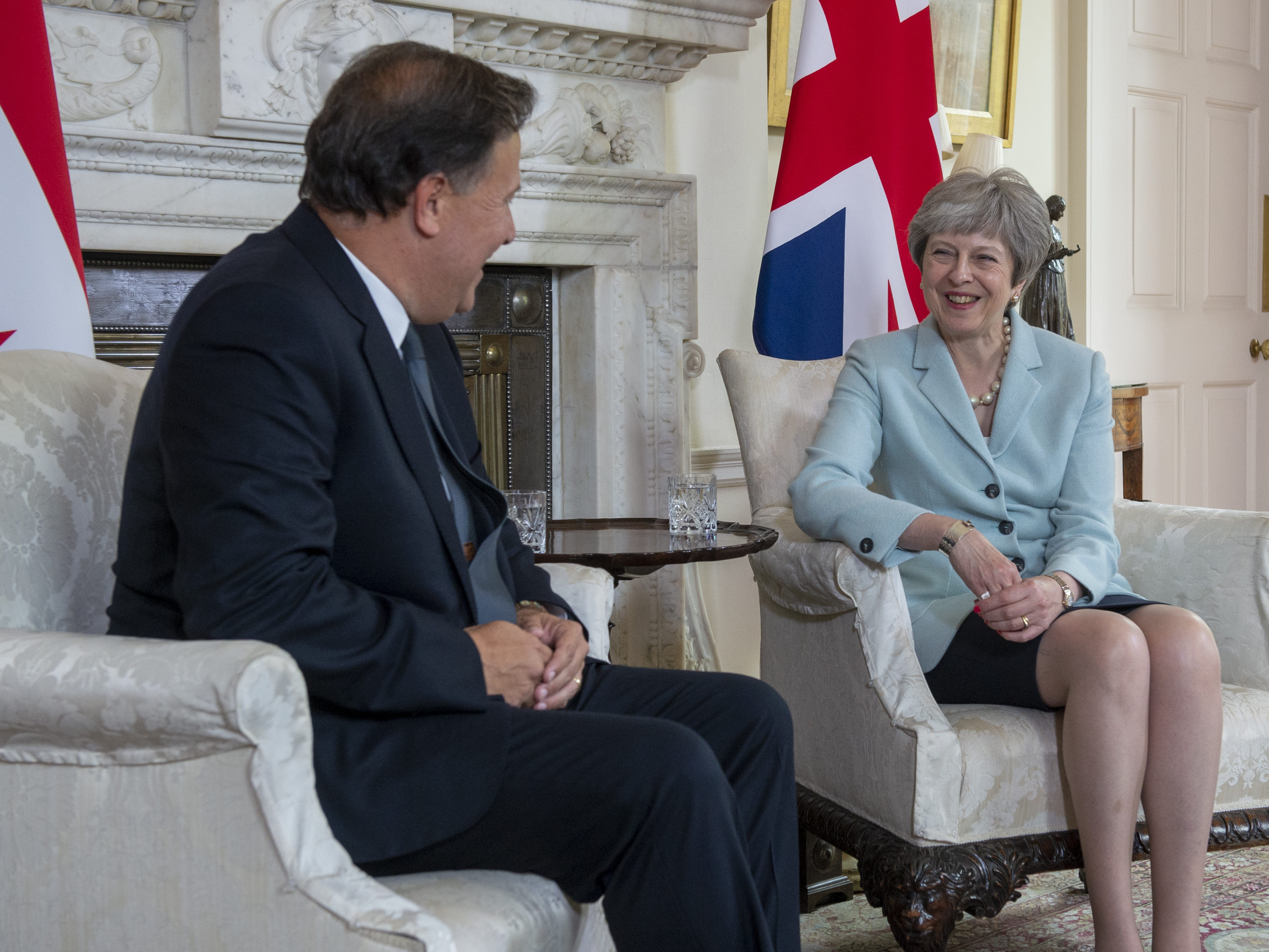
Panamanian President Juan Carlos Varela with British Prime Minister Theresa May in 10 Downing Street, May 2018.

Panama–United Kingdom relations are the bilateral relations between Panama and the United Kingdom. The two countries established diplomatic relations on 9 April 1908.

Both countries share common membership of the International Criminal Court, the World Trade Organization, and the Central America–United Kingdom Association Agreement. Bilaterally the two countries have a Double Taxation Convention, and an Investment Agreement.

== Economic relations ==
From 1 August 2013 until 30 December 2020, trade between Panama and the UK was governed by the Central America–European Union Association Agreement, while the United Kingdom was a member of the European Union.

Following the withdrawal of the United Kingdom from the European Union, the UK and Panama signed the Central America–United Kingdom Association Agreement on 18 July 2019. The Central America–United Kingdom Association Agreement is a continuity trade agreement, based on the EU free trade agreement, which entered into force on 1 January 2021. Trade value between Central America and the United Kingdom was worth £2,624 million in 2022.

== Diplomatic missions ==
- Panama maintains an embassy in London.
- The United Kingdom is accredited to Panama from its embassy in Panama City.

== See also ==
- Foreign relations of Panama
- Foreign relations of the United Kingdom
