= Central America–European Union Association Agreement =

The Central America–European Union Association Agreement is a free trade agreement between the European Union (EU) and the Central American Common Market. The agreement was signed on 29 June 2012 in Tegucigalpa. The association agreement had to be formally ratified by the European Union and all of its member states (except Croatia), as well as Costa Rica, El Salvador, Guatemala, Honduras, Nicaragua and Panama and was provisionally applied from 1 August 2013. Upon entry into force on 1 May 2024, it creates a free trade area between the EU and Central America.

== Brexit ==
Following the withdrawal of the United Kingdom from the European Union, the UK and the six Central American countries signed the Central America–United Kingdom Association Agreement, a continuity trade agreement, on 18 July 2019, based on the EU free trade agreement; the agreement entered into force on 1 January 2021. Trade value between the six Central American countries and the United Kingdom was worth £2,624 million in 2022.

== See also ==
- Central America–United Kingdom Association Agreement
- Free trade agreements of the European Union
- Free trade agreements of the United Kingdom
