= Central America–United Kingdom Association Agreement =

Free trade agreement signed in 2019

Agreement Establishing an Association between the United Kingdom of Great Britain and Northern Ireland and Central America
- Central America United Kingdom
- Type: Free Trade Agreement and Economic Integration Agreement
- Context: Trade Continuity Agreement between Central America and the United Kingdom
- Signed: 18 July 2019
- Location: Managua, Nicaragua
- Effective: 1 January 2021
- Negotiators: Dyalá Jiménez Figueres; Maria Luisa Hayem; Julio Dougherty; Arnaldo Castillo; Orlando Solorzano Delgadillo; Ross Denny
- Parties: Costa Rica; El Salvador; Guatemala; Honduras; Panama; United Kingdom
- Languages: English; Spanish

The Central America–United Kingdom Association Agreement is a free trade agreement between Central America and the United Kingdom. The agreement is a Trade Continuity Agreement that governs trade and broader cooperation between Costa Rica, El Salvador, Guatemala, Honduras, Panama, and the United Kingdom following the UK's withdrawal from the European Union.

Negotiations for this agreement were driven by the need to replace the arrangements previously covered by the Central America–European Union Association Agreement, which ceased to apply to the UK after Brexit. The new agreement closely replicates the effects of the Central America-EU deal, preserving preferential trade conditions and establishing a free trade area for goods, while also providing a platform for further trade liberalization and cooperation in areas such as investment, intellectual property, and public procurement. The text of the trade part of the agreement is largely based on the provisions of the Stabilisation and Association Agreement, adapted to the specifics of the Central America–UK relationship.

== History ==
From 1 August 2013 until 30 December 2020, trade between Central America and the UK was governed by the Central America–European Union Association Agreement, while the United Kingdom was a member of the European Union.

Following the withdrawal of the United Kingdom from the European Union, the Central American states and the UK signed the Central America–UK Association Agreement on 18 July 2019. The Association Agreement is a continuity trade agreement, based on the EU free trade agreement, which entered into force on 20 May 2021.

== See also ==
- Central America–European Union Association Agreement
- Comprehensive and Progressive Agreement for Trans-Pacific Partnership
- Costa Rica–United Kingdom relations
- Economy of Central America
- Economy of Costa Rica
- Economy of El Salvador
- Economy of Guatemala
- Economy of Honduras
- Economy of Panama
- Economy of the United Kingdom
- El Salvador–United Kingdom relations
- Free trade agreements of the European Union
- Free trade agreements of the United Kingdom
- Guatemala–United Kingdom relations
- Panama–United Kingdom relations
- Latin America–United Kingdom relations
- Latin American economy
