= Mary English (Anglo-Colombian) =

Anglo-Colombian adventurer, landowner, and farmer

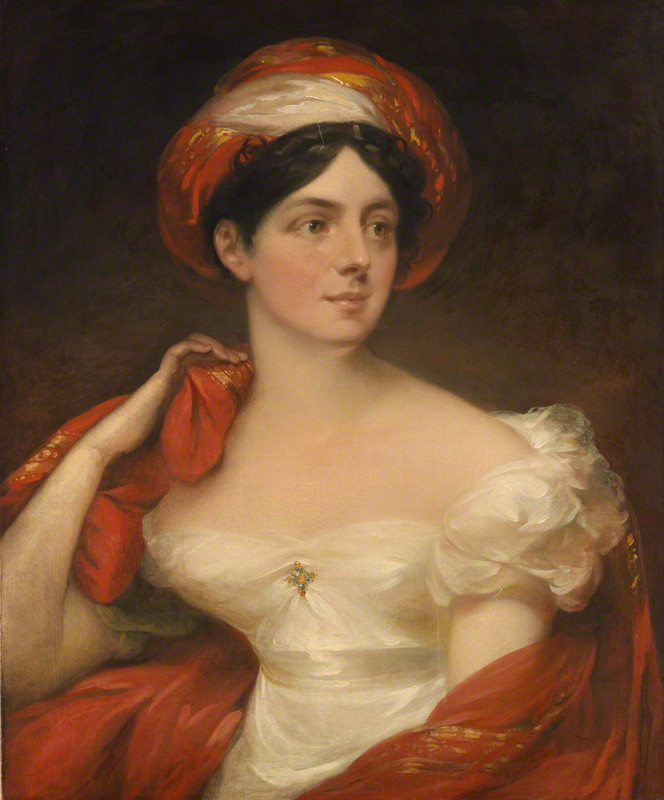
- Mary English by William Armfield Hobday in 1818
- Born: 22 March 1789; Kent, United Kingdom
- Died: 30 September 1846 (aged 57); Colombia
- Occupation: Landowner
- Known for: Being an Anglo-Colombian Businesswoman

Mary Courthope English (22 March 1789 – 30 September 1846), also commonly remembered as Mary Ballard, Mary Greenup and the Belle of Bogota, was an Anglo-Colombian adventurer, landowner, trade representative, farmer and businesswoman in Colombia.

Her personality and connections gave her financial and political agency in Colombia and Britain. She was at the heart of British relations with newly formed Colombia in its first decade of independence in the 1820s, and a leading social and cultural figure 1822–1826 in the Colombian capital, where she became known as the Belle of Bogotá.

Her letters provide intersectional social and economic perspectives on the early history of Colombia. Between 1828 and 1846 she successfully ran a cacao plantation, even though she was, as a woman, legally unable to do so at the time.

== Biography ==
Mary was born in Faversham, Kent in 1789, the second of the three daughters of Joseph and Ann Ballard. Her father was a dockworker. She became quite literate in her early years, and was deemed 'charismatic' and well connected in British society. She married James Delaney on 11 September 1809 at St George's Church in Hanover Square in London, and in 1810 gave birth to her daughter Eliza.

She visited the site of the Battle of Waterloo in 1815 after the battle, and purportedly “tried on Napoleon's dressing gown, moralised on the mutability of human greatness[, and] reflected upon the scene of havoc”.

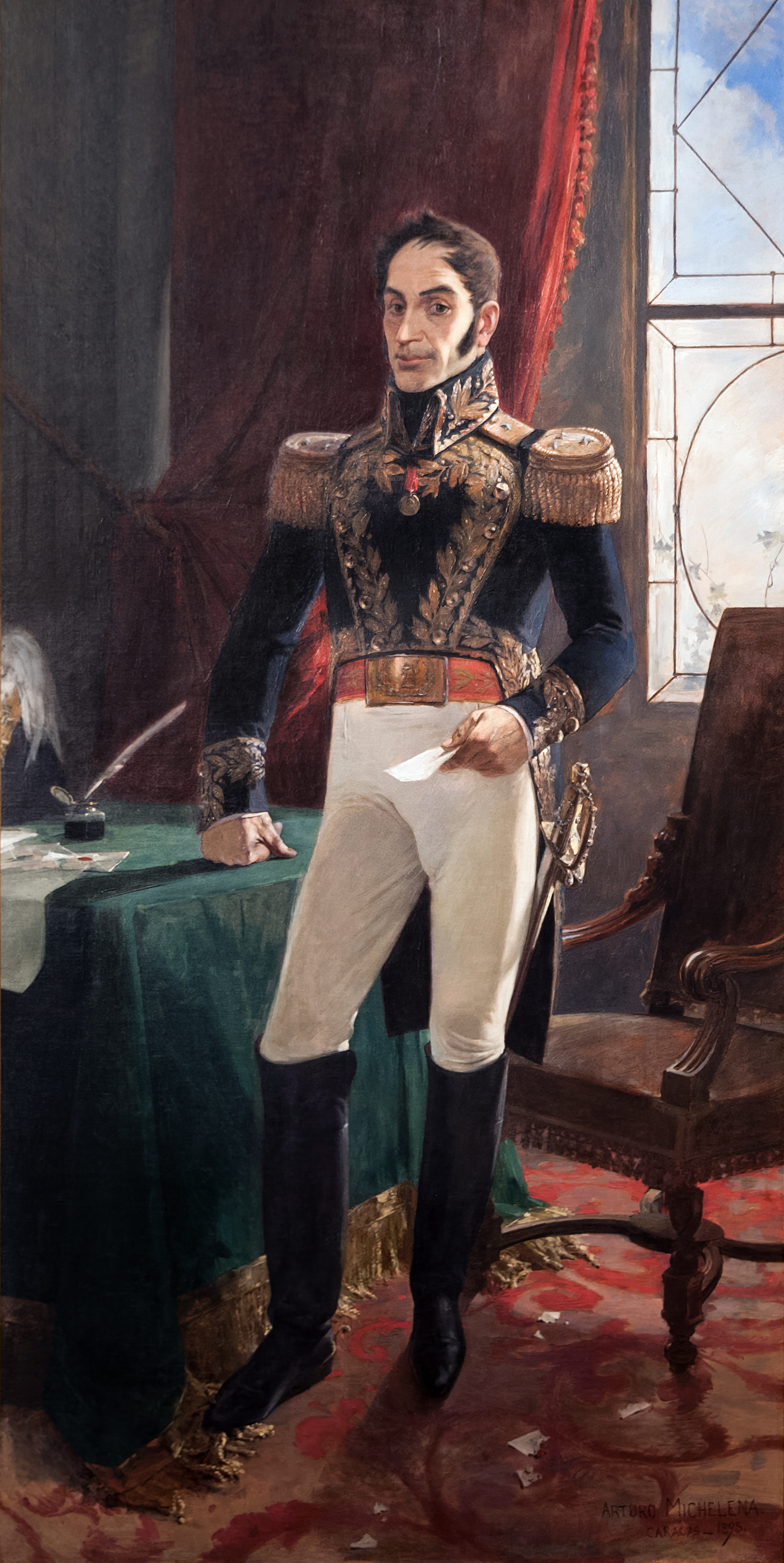
Portrait of Simón Bolívar by Arturo Michelena

Separated from Delaney, she married General James Towers English on 28 January 1819 in St Clement Danes, London, then traveled to what is now Venezuela on 7 February 1819, leaving Eliza in the care of John Tylden, a City banker associated with a number of British volunteer exploits in South America. The marriage benefited English, as his wife's friendly relations with financiers and statesmen enabled his career.

As the general's wife, Mary performed ceremonial and matriarchal duties like reviewing the troops and nursing them through yellow fever. Her letters to England provide much of the Colombian news of the day for the London Weekly Dispatch and The Morning Chronicle. General English served under Simon Bolivar in the Spanish American wars of independence, and died of an illness in September 1819. His widow then worked for Herring and Richardson, a financial firm in Colombia, from 1819 to 1822. She was paid £2000 for her work. Mary lived in a property owned by Admiral Luis Brión, and in early June 1820 gave birth to a stillborn son.

From 1822 on she became a leading financial figure in the British community in Colombia, and a staunch supporter of Bolivar. With many offers of marriage, she became known as the Belle of Bogota. On 17 March 1822 Mary married Colonel John Low in a marriage of convenience in Maracaibo, where the remaining British volunteers were based. She had had relations with Low outside of marriage and rumours of bigamy between Mary, Delancy and Low created a political scandal in Cúcuta, which ended with both General Antonio Nariño and the commander of the Irish legion, General John Devereux, being taken before the congress to quell further rumours. Mary returned to England in 1822 and visited Eliza.

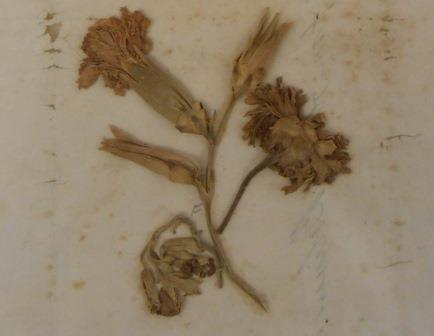
Flowers given to Mary English by Simon Bolivar on 20 November 1826

When she returned after six months as the Colombian representative for H&R, with goods to sell in Colombia. In 1824 Bogotá she emerged on the thriving social scene of a city flush with newly promised British investment, became a devoted political aide to Bolívar, and as the Belle found herself at the centre of the capital's busy social scene. Rumours quickly spread that the many suitable men who desired her hand included Bolivar, whom she had met in 1826. British plenipotentiary to Colombia Patrick Campbell also tried in vain with their marriage abruptly annulled in December 1826.

She eventually was betrothed to landowner William M. Greenup (d.1842) on 1 January 1827 in Bogotá, and they bought a sizeable piece of land in San José de Cúcuta to grow cacao beans for export to Europe. With her new estate to manage, she retreated from society life and into the Colombian campo while Greenup, in England 1828–1838, took on guardianship of Eliza. The British expat community led wealthy lifestyles, often on their own dime and frequently in smaller numbers after the London stock market crash of 1825–1826. The British government did not back either the new state of Colombia or even Bolivar until 1826; British policymakers deemed the new state's future too uncertain.

She wrote in a letter dated 30 June 1828 that "The result is pretty certain. Bolivar will be declared Dictator throughout the country".

Mary died on 30 September 1846 from ill health on her estate at El Pescadero outside Cúcuta. In her lifetime, successive South American governments failed to grant her citizenship, based on her failure to meet the standards of the law due to her gender, and ensuing inability under the law to own land. As she was not Catholic, she was interred in her neighbour's hacienda La Victoria, now part of modern Cucuta, in Norte de Santander.
