= List of diplomatic missions in Costa Rica =

This is a list of diplomatic missions in Costa Rica. There are currently 38 embassies in San José.

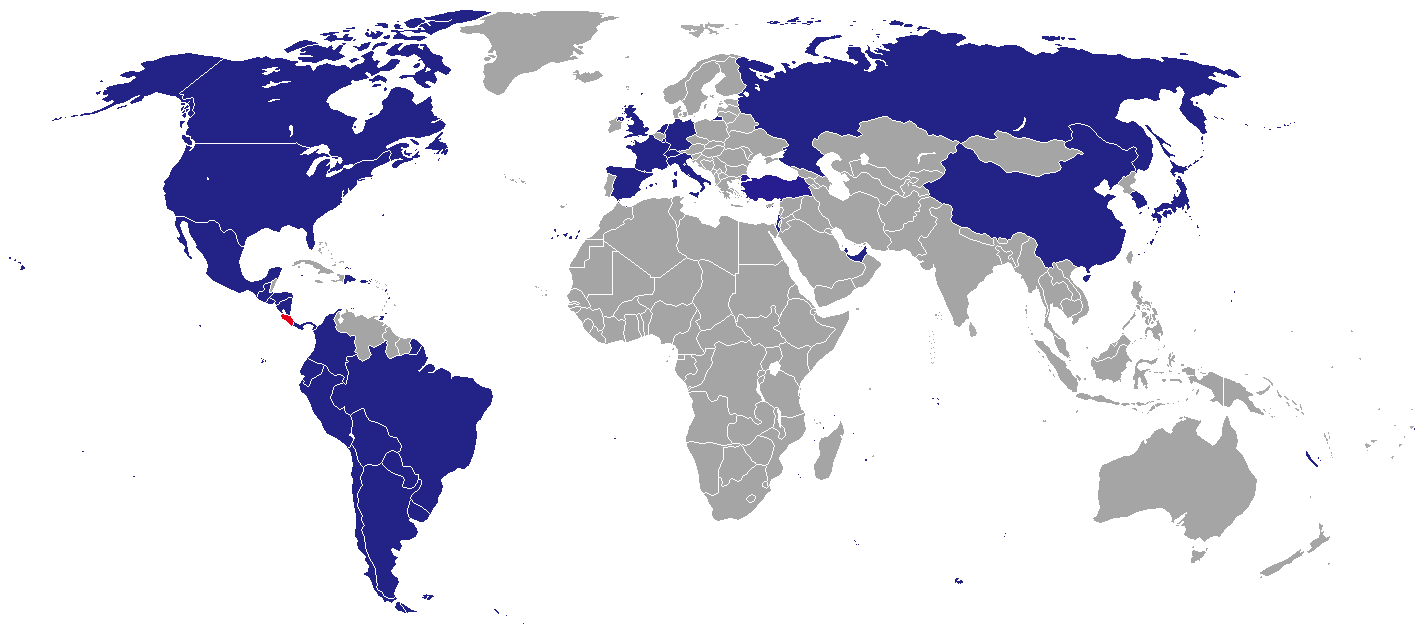
Map of diplomatic missions in Costa Rica

== Diplomatic missions in San José ==
=== Embassies ===
1. Argentina
2. Bolivia
3. Brazil
4. Canada
5. Chile
6. China
7. Colombia
8. Dominican Republic
9. Ecuador
10. El Salvador
11. France
12. Germany
13. Guatemala
14. Holy See
15. Honduras
16. India
17. Israel
18. Italy
19. Japan
20. Luxembourg
21. Mexico
22. Netherlands
23. Nicaragua
24. Panama
25. Paraguay
26. Peru
27. Qatar
28. Russia
29. South Korea
30. Sovereign Military Order of Malta
31. Spain
32. Switzerland
33. Trinidad and Tobago
34. Turkey
35. United Arab Emirates
36. United Kingdom
37. United States
38. Uruguay

=== Other missions or delegations ===
- European Union
- Puerto Rico (Trade Office)

== Gallery ==
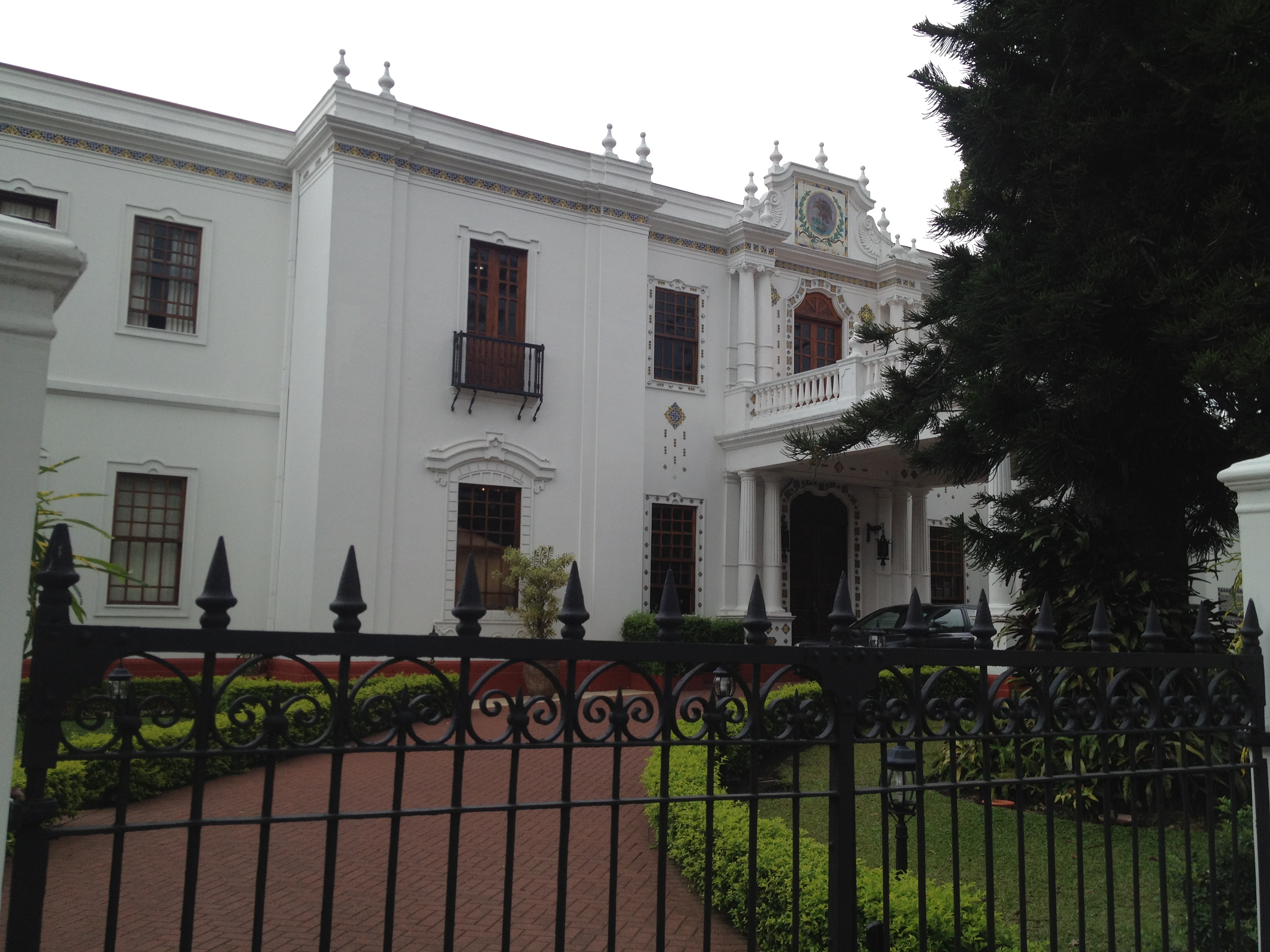
Embassy of Mexico

Embassy of the United States

== Non-resident embassies ==
In Mexico City except if noted otherwise

- Afghanistan (Washington, D.C.)
- Algeria
- Angola (Havana)
- Australia
- Austria
- Azerbaijan
- Bangladesh
- Bahrain (Washington, D.C.)
- Bosnia and Herzegovina (New York City)
- Belgium (Panama City)
- Bulgaria
- Burundi (New York City)
- Cambodia (Havana)
- Central African Republic (New York City)
- Comoros (New York City)
- Croatia (New York City)
- Cyprus
- Congo-Brazzaville (Havana)
- Congo-Kinshasa (Havana)
- Cape Verde (Washington, D.C.)
- Czech Republic (Bogotá)
- Dominica (Washington, D.C.)
- Denmark (Bogotá)
- Djibouti (Havana)
- Egypt (Panama City)
- Estonia (Washington, D.C.)
- Ethiopia (Havana)
- Eritrea (New York City)
- Finland
- Fiji (New York City)
- Gambia (New York City)
- Ghana (Washington, D.C.)
- Guinea (Havana)
- Guinea-Bissau (New York City)
- Greece
- Hungary
- Haiti (Panama City)
- Iceland (New York City)
- Indonesia (Panama City)
- Iran (Managua)
- Iraq
- Ireland
- Ivory Coast
- Jordan
- Jamaica (New York City)
- Kuwait
- Kenya (Washington, D.C.)
- Kosovo (Panama City)
- Kyrgyzstan (Washington, D.C.)
- Laos (Havana)
- Lebanon (Bogota)
- Lesotho (Ottawa)
- Libya (Managua)
- Marshall Islands (New York City)
- Mali (Havana)
- Malaysia
- Maldives (New York City)
- Mauritius (Washington, D.C.)
- Mauritania (Washington, D.C.)
- Micronesia (New York City)
- Morocco (Guatemala City)
- Montenegro (New York City)
- Nauru (New York City)
- Nigeria
- Norway (Bogotá)
- Oman (Washington, D.C.)
- Pakistan
- Palestine (Managua)
- Philippines
- Portugal (Panama City)
- Poland
- Papua New Guinea (Washington, D.C.)
- Romania
- Rwanda (Washington, D.C.)
- Sierra Leone (New York City)
- Serbia
- Slovakia
- South Africa
- Saudi Arabia (Lima)
- São Tomé and Príncipe (New York City)
- Sahrawi Republic (Panama City)
- Singapore (Washington, D.C.)
- Sweden (Guatemala City)
- Seychelles (Washington, D.C.)
- Syria (Caracas)
- Sudan (Washington, D.C.)
- South Sudan (Washington, D.C.)
- Somalia (Washington, D.C.)
- Thailand (Santiago)
- Timor-Leste (Havana)
- Togo (Washington, D.C.)
- Turkmenistan (New York City)
- Tunisia (Washington, D.C.)
- Tajikistan (Washington, D.C.)
- Tanzania (Washington, D.C.)
- Ukraine
- Uganda (Washington, D.C.)
- Uzbekistan
- Vietnam (Havana)
- Vanuatu (Washington, D.C.)
- Yemen (Havana)
- Zambia (Washington, D.C.)
- Zimbabwe (Havana)

== Former missions ==
- Belgium
- Cuba (closed in 2026)
- Czech Republic (closed in 2011)
- Hungary (closed in 1991)
- Poland (closed in 2015)
- Taiwan (closed in 2007)
- Venezuela (closed in 2024)

== Embassies to open ==
- Saudi Arabia

== See also ==
- Foreign relations of Costa Rica
- List of diplomatic missions of Costa Rica
- Visa requirements for Costa Rican citizens
