= 2009 Citizens' Action Party presidential primary =

Costa Rican primary election

- 31 May 2009
- Registered: 67,170
- Turnout: 33.42%
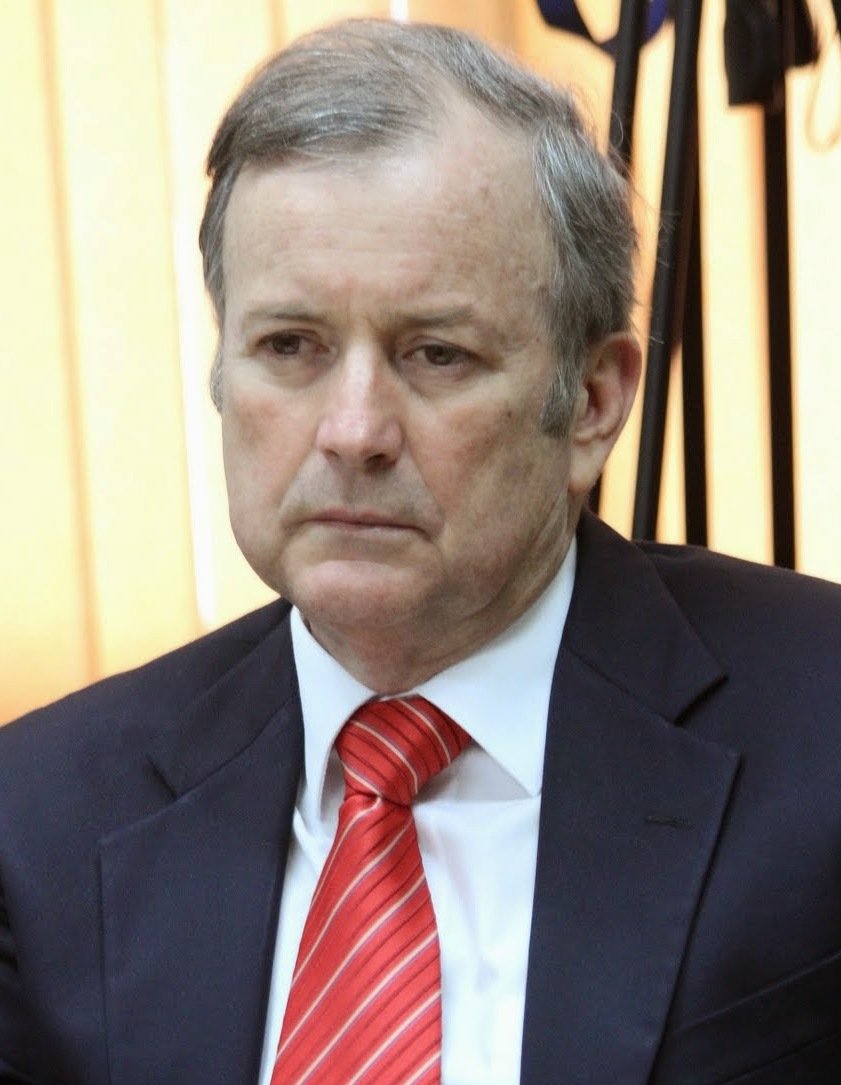

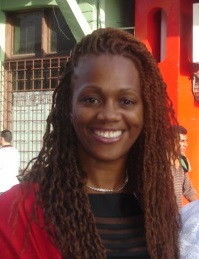

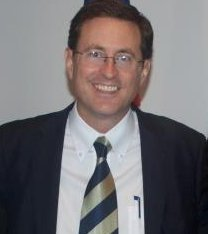
Nominee	Ottón Solís	Epsy Campbell	Román Macaya
Party	PAC	PAC	PAC
Popular vote	16,068	4,227	2,155
Percentage	71.57%	18.83%	9.60%
Previous Presidential Candidate
Ottón Solís
Presidential Candidate
Ottón Solís

A primary election was held for the first time among the members of Costa Rica’s Citizens’ Action Party (PAC), known as the Citizens' National Convention (Convención Nacional Ciudadana) for the selection of the party's candidate in the 2010 general election. This was a closed primary, as potential electors were required to register before the election up till April 30, 2009.

PAC is one of Costa Rica's major parties and was for this time the main oppositional political force, but unlike other major parties, has never until then held a primary for the nomination of the party's candidate, as previous candidate Ottón Solís was chosen by the party's National Assembly for the 2002 and 2006 general elections and was regarded as an almost indisputable party leader.

After negotiations with other party members interested in the nomination, most noticeable former deputy and vice-president nominee Epsy Campbell and businessman and scientist Román Macaya, the convention's date was established on May 31 of that year.

Several debates among PAC and PLN's candidate were organized in different colleges, NGOs and news networks. In PAC's case the most noticeable were May 17 in Repretel Canal 6, May 24 in Teletica Canal 7 and May 28 in government's own Canal 13, three of Costa Rica's main television channels.

The polls were open from 6 am to 8 pm and although 67.170 were registered to vote only 22.450 did so. The results was a landslide victory for Solís achieving over 71% of the votes. Campbell received 18% and Macaya 9%.

== See also ==
- 2010 Costa Rican general election
- National Liberation Party presidential primary, 2009
