= Visa policy of Costa Rica =

Policy on permits required to enter Costa Rica

Visitors to Costa Rica must obtain a visa from one of the Costa Rican diplomatic missions unless they are citizens from one of the visa-exempt countries.

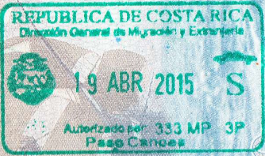
Entry and exit stamps.

Costa Rican visas are documents issued by the Dirección General de Migración y Extranjería, which is part of the Ministry of Interior and Police, with the stated goal of regulating and facilitating migratory flows.

== Visa policy map ==
Visa policy of Costa Rica Costa Rica Visa not required (180 days) Visa not required (30 days) Visa not required (30 days) if holding a valid Canadian, Schengen or US multiple-entry visa, or a residence permit issued by any Schengen Area member state, Canada, Cyprus, Ireland or the US; otherwise, visa required Visa not required (30 days) if holding a valid Canadian, Schengen or US multiple-entry visa, or a residence permit issued by any Schengen Area member state, Canada, Cyprus, Ireland or the US; otherwise, restricted visa with a prior authorization required

== Visa exemption ==
=== Ordinary passports ===
Citizens of the following countries and territories may enter Costa Rica without a visa for the following period:

180 days^{1}

- All European Union member states^{3}

- Andorra
- Argentina
- Australia^{3}
- Bahamas
- Brazil
- Canada
- Chile
- Iceland
- Israel
- Japan
- Liechtenstein
- Mexico
- Monaco
- Montenegro
- New Zealand^{3}
- Norway^{3}
- Panama
- Paraguay
- Peru
- Qatar
- San Marino
- Serbia
- Singapore
- South Africa
- South Korea
- Switzerland
- Trinidad and Tobago
- United Arab Emirates
- United Kingdom^{3}
- United States^{3}
- Uruguay
- Ukraine
- Vatican City

30 days^{2} ^{4}

- Antigua and Barbuda
- Barbados
- Belize
- Bolivia
- Brunei
- Dominica
- El Salvador^{1}
- Fiji
- Grenada
- Guatemala
- Guyana
- Honduras
- Kiribati
- Malaysia
- Maldives
- Marshall Islands
- Mauritius
- Micronesia
- Nauru
- Palau
- Philippines
- Russia
- Saint Kitts and Nevis
- Saint Lucia
- Saint Vincent and the Grenadines
- Samoa
- São Tomé and Príncipe
- Seychelles
- Solomon Islands
- Suriname
- Taiwan
- Tonga
- Turkey
- Tuvalu
- Vanuatu

_{1 - Passport must be valid for at least one day on arrival.}
_{2 - Passport must be valid for at least three months on arrival.}
_{3 - Including overseas territories of Australia, Denmark, France, Netherlands, New Zealand, Norway, United Kingdom, United States.}
_{4 - Length of stay extendable up to 90 days.}

In addition, citizens of China who hold passports endorsed "for public affairs" do not require a visa to enter Costa Rica for a maximum stay of 30 days.

Date of visa changes
- 30 May 1966: Spain
- 5 July 1968: Israel
- 13 September 1968: Austria
- 1 September 1971: France
- October 1971: Yugoslavia (applies today to Croatia, Montenegro, Serbia and Slovenia)
- 16 September 1974: Japan
- 6 December 1996: Brazil
- 24 November 2003: Latvia
- 12 April 2014: Russia (resumed)
- 13 December 2015: Peru
- 14 December 2016: Brunei, Kazakhstan, Malaysia, Qatar, Taiwan, Ukraine, United Arab Emirates
- 25 October 2023: Honduras (resumed)

Cancelled:

- Colombia: 1 April 2002
- Russia: 1 February 2008 (was resumed in 2014)
- Venezuela: 21 February 2022
- Kazakhstan: 29 May 2023
- Honduras: 10 October 2023

==== Substitute visa ====
Citizens of other countries who would normally require visas may enter Costa Rica for a maximum stay of 30 days if they are holding a valid multiple-entry visa or residence permit issued by the following countries. Residence permits and visas must be valid for more than 6 months on arrival.

- (European Union) Any Schengen Area member state^{2}

- Canada
- Cyprus^{1}
- Ireland^{1}
- United States^{3}

_{1 - For holders of residence permits only.}
_{2 - For holders of multiple-entry "C" and "D" visas only.}
_{3 - Green Cards or U.S. visas must be valid for more than six months on arrival except for holders of B or D visas. Not applicable to holders of "C1", "C2", and "C3" visas.}

=== Non-ordinary passports ===
In addition, holders of diplomatic or service/official passports of China (30 days), Colombia, Cuba (30 days), Dominican Republic, Ecuador, Indonesia, Morocco (30 days), Saudi Arabia, Singapore (180 days), Thailand and Vietnam may enter Costa Rica without a visa for up to 90 days (unless otherwise noted).

== Restricted visa with a prior authorization required ==
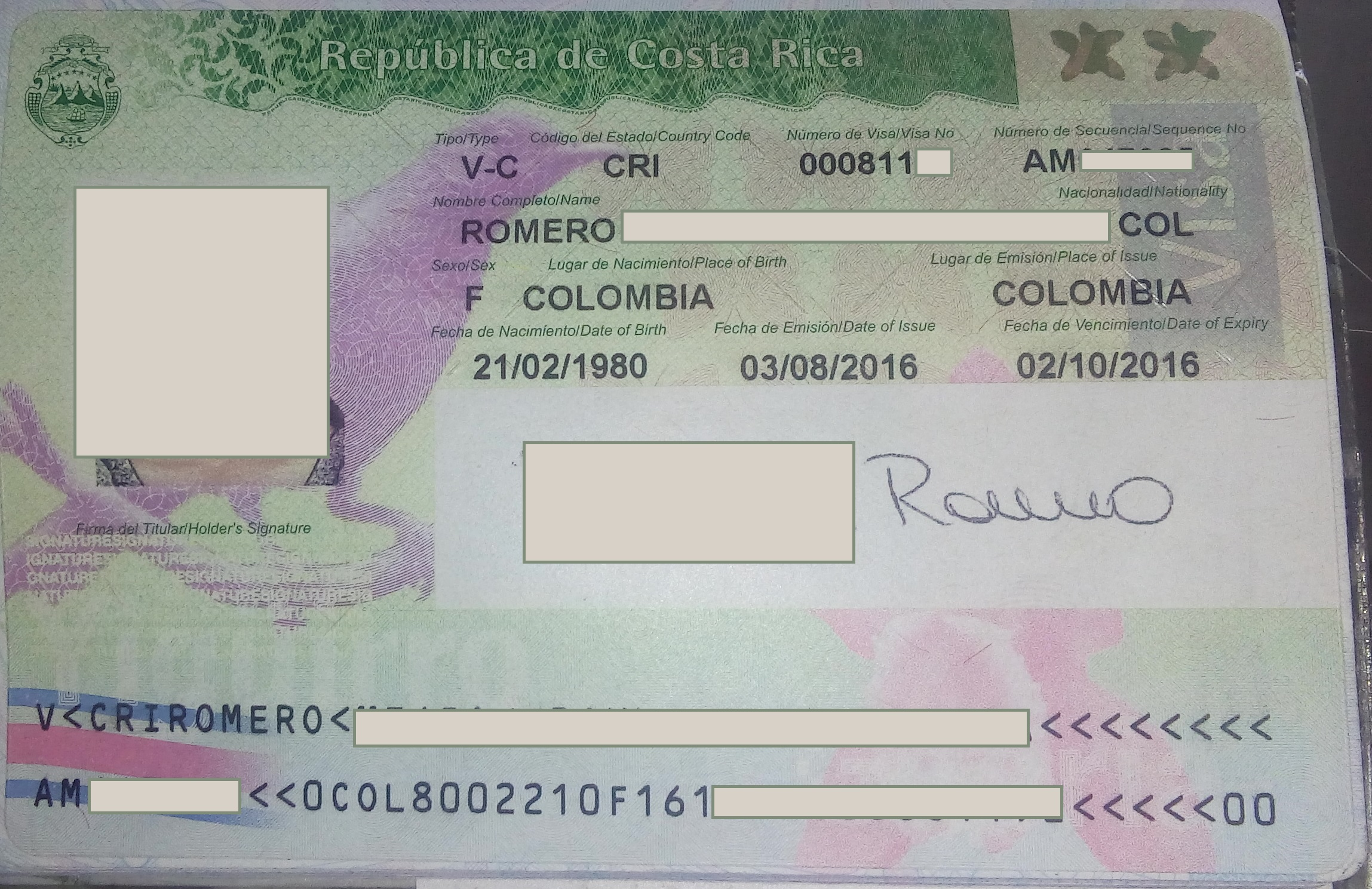
A tourist visa for Costa Rica

Citizens of the following countries must have their visa approved by the Commission for Restricted Visas before arrival:

- Afghanistan
- Azerbaijan
- Bangladesh
- Cuba
- Eritrea
- Ethiopia
- Haiti
- Kazakhstan
- Kyrgyzstan
- Iran
- Iraq
- Jamaica
- Mauritania
- Myanmar
- North Korea
- Pakistan
- Palestine
- Somalia
- Sri Lanka
- Syria
- Tajikistan
- Turkmenistan
- Uzbekistan

=== Transit visa ===
Costa Rica also requires citizens of Afghanistan, Angola, Azerbaijan, Bangladesh, Benin, Burkina Faso, Cameroon, Cape Verde, Republic of Congo, Cuba, Djibouti, Equatorial Guinea, Eritrea, Ethiopia, Gambia, Georgia, Ghana, Guinea, Guinea Bissau, Haiti, India, Iran, Iraq, Jamaica, Kazakhstan, Kenya, Kyrgyzstan, Mali, Mauritania, Morocco, Mozambique, Myanmar (Burma), North Korea, Nicaragua, Nigeria, Pakistan, Senegal, Somalia, Sri Lanka, Syria, Tajikistan, Togo, Turkmenistan, Uzbekistan, Venezuela and Yemen to apply for transit visas before transiting through the country.

== Visitor statistics ==
Most visitors arriving in Costa Rica were from the following countries of nationality:

Country	2017	2016	2015	2014	2013
United States	1,199,241	1,233,277	1,077,044	997,262	929,402
Nicaragua	429,990	440,049	446,870	463,959	476,678
Canada	201,921	188,104	175,771	172,730	160,398
Mexico	106,783	94,499	84,940	75,045	72,568
Panama	104,795	99,917	97,135	68,340	98,275
El Salvador	81,091	78,273	69,427	63,214	64,552
Guatemala	78,032	65,063	57,600	55,677	56,756
United Kingdom	76,173	71,392	47,499	39,545	35,198
Germany	70,960	67,939	66,450	63,916	54,754
France	69,803	61,503	54,773	49,681	39,728
Spain	69,782	67,453	65,188	64,303	52,950
Total	2,959,869	2,925,128	2,660,257	2,526,817	2,427,941

== See also ==
- Visa requirements for Costa Rican citizens
