= Costa Rican passport =

Passport issued to citizens of Costa Rica

Costa Rican passport; Pasaporte costarricense
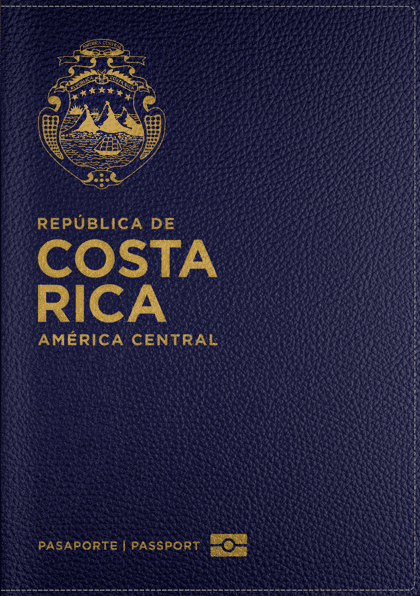
- The front cover of a Costa Rican biometric passport since 2022 (with chip).
- Type: Passport
- Issued by: Costa Rica
- First issued: First version (January 2006, 01; 20 years ago); Biometric passport (March 2022, 07; 4 years ago)
- Purpose: Identification
- Eligibility: Costa Rican citizenship
- Expiration: 10 years after issuance (persons aged 18 and over)

A Costa Rican passport (Spanish: Pasaporte costarricense) is an identity document issued to Costa Rican citizens to travel outside Costa Rica. Currently, it is valid for 10 years (6 years before 2022). It is issued to people born on Costa Rican soil (who are citizens by default), and to children of Costa Rican citizens born abroad, who are reported to the nearest Costa Rican consulate (whose birth, immediately after such report, is recorded in the civil registry). Children born overseas to a Costa Rican citizen are Costa Rican by birth, not by naturalisation, as stated in the Constitution of Costa Rica.

As of 1 October 2019, Costa Rican citizens had visa-free or visa on arrival access to 150 countries and territories, ranking the Costa Rican passport 27th overall and first among Central American countries, in terms of travel freedom according to the Henley Passport Index.

As of early 2022, the Costa Rican government began issuing biometric passports. The passports showcase four important elements of the country: Biodiversity, Renewable Energy, Education and Peace, and Talent.

== Appearance ==
It is dark blue on the outside, with gilded letters and a gilded Costa Rican coat of arms.

== Gallery of historic images ==
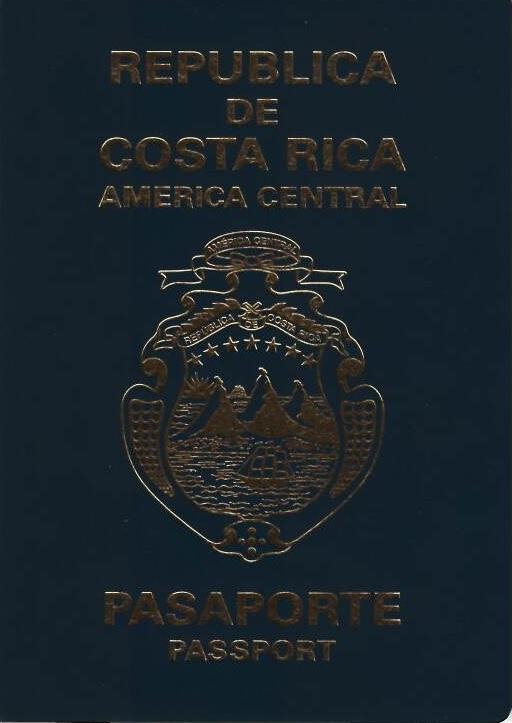
Costa Rican passport issued in 2017

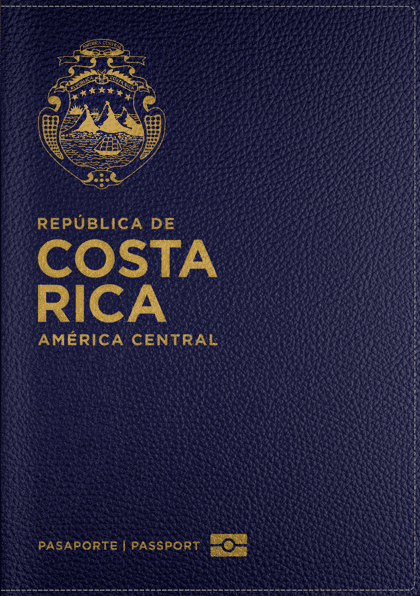
Costa Rican passport issued in 2022

== See also ==
- List of passports
- Visa requirements for Costa Rican citizens
