= Román Macaya =

Costa Rican scientist, entrepreneur, diplomat, and public servant

Román Macaya Hayes
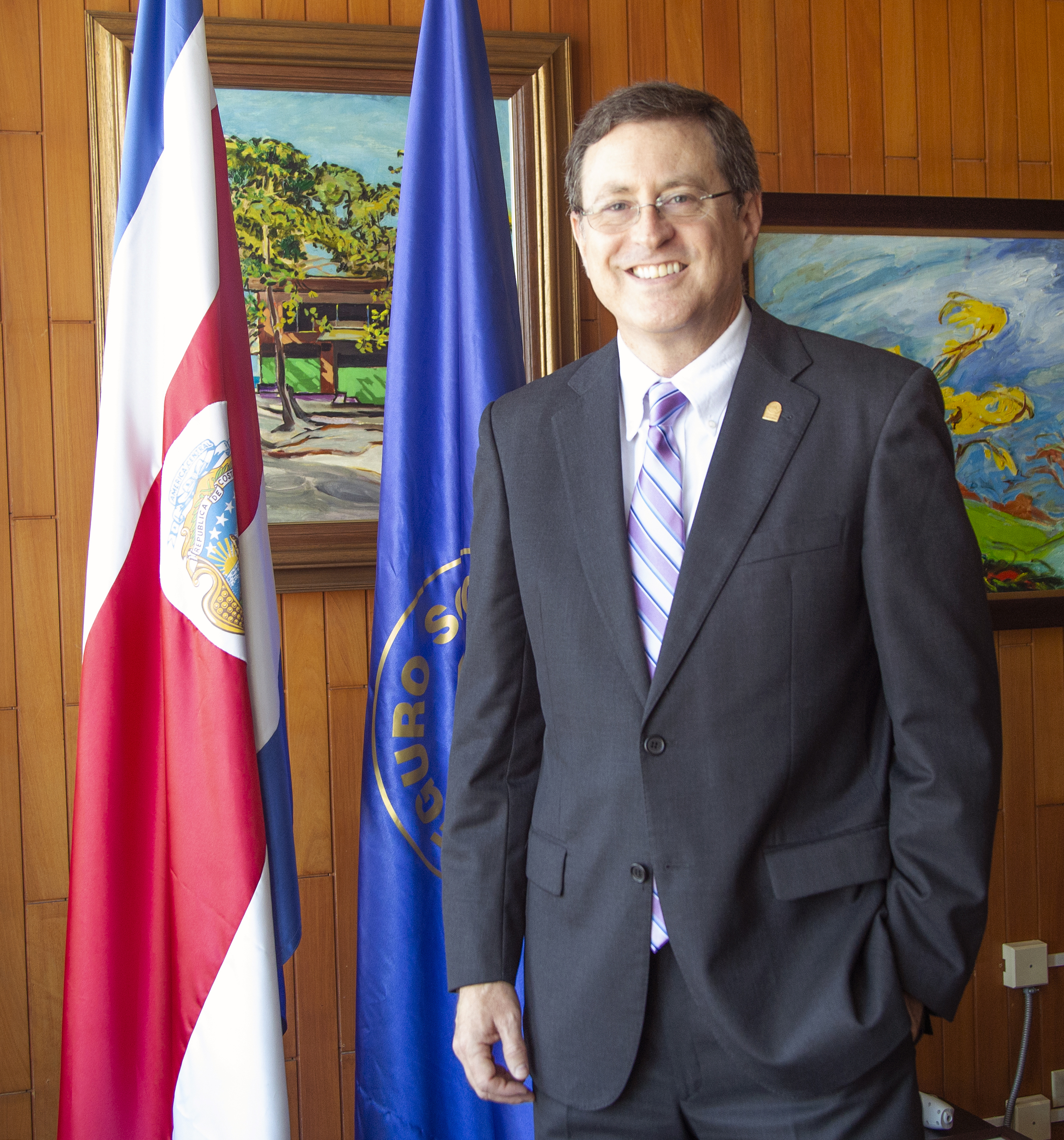

President of the Costa Rican Social Security Fund
- In office August 1, 2018 – May 8, 2022
- President: Carlos Alvarado Quesada
- Preceded by: Fernando Llorca Castro

Costa Rican Ambassador to the United States
- In office August 20, 2014 – July 31, 2018
- President: Luis Guillermo Solís
- Preceded by: Muni Figueres Boggs

Personal details
- Born: September 19, 1966 (age 60) Florida, United States
- Education: Middlebury College; University of California at Los Angeles; Wharton School of the University of Pennsylvania

Román Macaya Hayes is a Costa Rican scientist, entrepreneur, diplomat, and public servant. From 2018-2022 he served as the Executive President and Chairman of the Board of the Costa Rican Social Security [Caja Costarricense de Seguro Social (CCSS)], the institution that finances and provides universal coverage of public health care services in Costa Rica and manages the largest pension fund of the country. In this role he led the health care delivery response to the COVID-19 pandemic. Macaya spearheaded key priority programs, such as deploying the largest investment in physical and technological infrastructure in the history of the CCSS, promoting innovation throughout the institution, implementing the most ambitious digital transformation agenda, and revamping both the health care delivery and pension system to respond to a rapidly aging population.

Prior to leading the CCSS, Macaya served as Costa Rica's Ambassador to the United States, a post he held from 2014 through 2018. As ambassador, Macaya promoted science diplomacy between both countries in biomedical research, space, water, biodiversity, and technology. He also strengthened cooperation in security, migratory matters, environmental conservation, and the arts, in addition to supporting the attraction of foreign direct investment. Macaya worked with the White House, Department of State, Department of Homeland Security, and Congress to strengthen Costa Rica´s capabilities in drug interdiction, resulting in the largest multi-year appropriations for Costa Rica in over 30 years.

Macaya has held leadership positions in the fields of health care and agriculture. In the healthcare field, in addition to leading Costa Rica´s single payer/single provider of public health care services, he has served as a biomedical scientist in the biotechnology industry, and as a businessman/entrepreneur in clinical research, private equity, and health care consulting. In the field of agriculture he led the growth and development of a crop protection company, served on the Board of Directors of Costa Rica's National Chamber of Agriculture and Agro-industry, and founded and presided over the National (Costa Rican), Latin American, and Global industry associations that engaged with governments and multilateral institutions such as the World Trade Organization (Geneva), World Health Organization (Geneva), and Food and Agriculture Organization (Rome) on regulatory matters.

== Early life and education ==
Román Macaya was born on September 19, 1966, in the State of Florida, and grew up in a bicultural household, son of a Bostonian mother and a Costa Rican father. His family moved to the port town of Puntarenas in Costa Rica when he was three years old, and later moved to the town of Guadalupe on the outskirts of San José (Costa Rica), where he grew up until graduating from high school. Macaya attended Middlebury College in Vermont, where he obtained a Bachelor of Arts in chemistry, a minor in modern art, and played varsity tennis. After college, Macaya attended the University of California at Los Angeles (UCLA), where he obtained a Ph.D. in biochemistry. At UCLA, Macaya determined the solution structure of novel triple- and quadruple-stranded DNA structures in the laboratory of Professor Juli Feigon. Macaya later attended the Wharton School of Business of the University of Pennsylvania, where he graduated with an MBA in health care management. Macaya is first author on numerous scientific publications and lead inventor on several patent applications.

== Public service ==
On March 4, 2009, Román Macaya announced his intention to run in the first primary election of the Citizen's Action Party to seek the presidency. He ran against Ottón Solís, the founder of the Party, and other well-known party leaders. He was ultimately defeated on May 31, 2009, during the Citizens' Action Party's National Convention. While he never ran again in a primary election, he has served in the administrations of President Luis Guillermo Solís (2014–2018) as ambassador to the United States and of President Carlos Alvarado Quesada (2018–2022) as the executive president and chairman of the board of the Costa Rican Social Security.

== Family ==
Roman is married and has four children.
