= Visa requirements for Costa Rican citizens =

Administrative entry restrictions

Visa requirements for Costa Rican citizens are administrative entry restrictions by the authorities of other states placed on citizens of Costa Rica.

As of 2026, Costa Rican citizens had visa-free or visa on arrival access to 148 countries and territories, ranking the Costa Rican passport 24th overall and first among Central American countries, in terms of travel freedom according to the Henley Passport Index.

== Visa requirements map ==
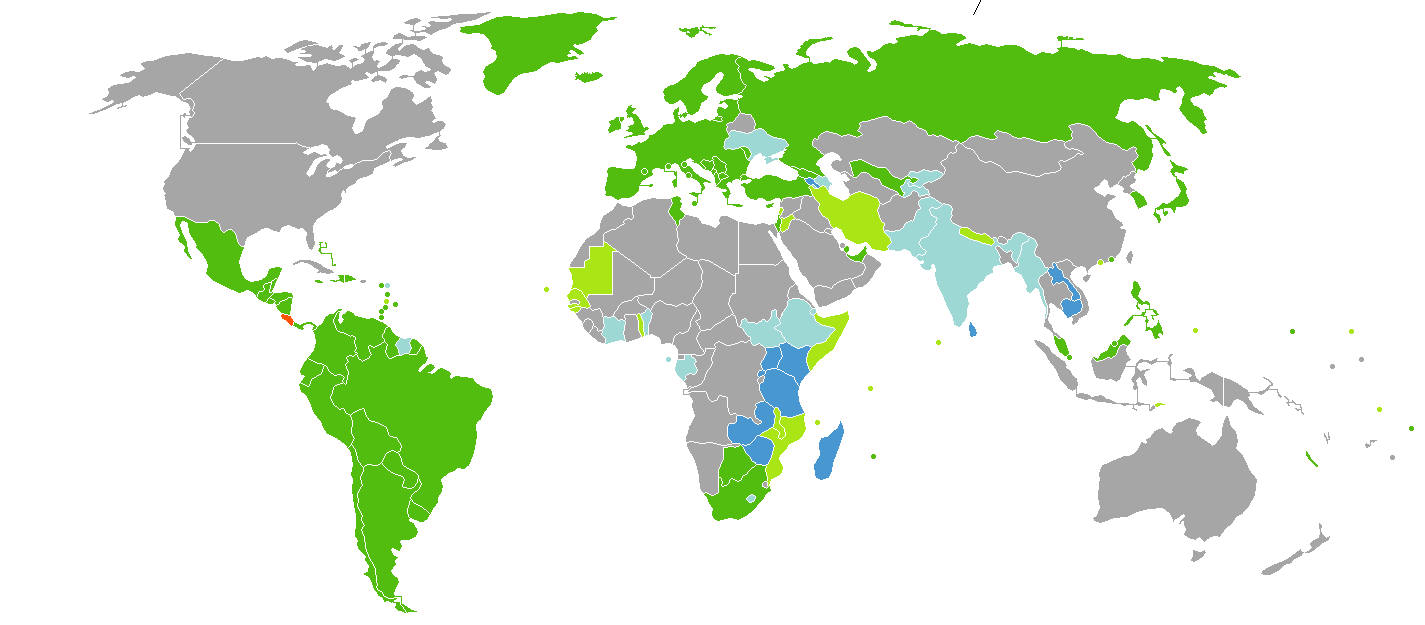
Visa requirements for Costa Rican citizens Costa Rica Visa free access Visa on arrival Visa on arrival or eVisa eVisa Visa required

== Visa requirements ==
Visa requirements for holders of normal passports traveling for tourist purposes:

Country	Visa requirement	Allowed stay	Notes (excluding departure fees)
Afghanistan	eVisa	30 days	Visa is not required in case born in Afghanistan or can proof that one of their parents is a national of Afghanistan or born in Afghanistan.; e-Visa : Visitors must arrive at Kabul International (KBL).
Albania	Visa not required	90 days	
Algeria	Visa required		
Andorra	Visa not required		
Angola	Visa required		
Antigua and Barbuda	eVisa		
Argentina	Visa not required	3 months	
Armenia	eVisa	120 days	Costa Rican citizens can get Visa on arrival if they provide a valid residence permit or valid visa issued by the EU and Schengen member states, the USA, Australia, New Zealand, the Republic of Korea, the UK, Canada, the Russian Federation, or Japan or a valid residence permit (physical card or sticker) issued by one of the GCC member states.
Australia	Visa required		May apply online (Online Visitor e600 visa).
Austria	Visa not required	90 days	90 days within any 180 day period in the Schengen Area
Azerbaijan	eVisa	30 days	
Bahamas	Visa not required	3 months	
Bahrain	eVisa / visa on arrival		
Bangladesh	Visa on arrival	30 days	
Barbados	Visa not required	90 days	
Belarus	Visa required		Visas are issued on arrival at the Minsk International Airport if the support documents were submitted not later than 3 business days before expected date of arrival.
Belgium	Visa not required	90 days	90 days within any 180 day period in the Schengen Area
Belize	Visa not required	90 days	
Benin	eVisa	30 days	Must have an international vaccination certificate.
Bhutan	eVisa	90 days	May independently obtain an e-Visa whose duration of stay is 90 days. Visa fee is 40 USD per person (nonrefundable). Visa application may be processed within 5 business days.; e-Visa applicant is also subject to pay Sustainable Development Fee of 100 USD per day.
Bolivia	Visa not required	90 days	
Bosnia and Herzegovina	Visa not required	90 days	90 days within any 6-month period
Botswana	Visa not required	90 days	
Brazil	Visa not required	90 days	
Brunei	Visa not required	14 days	
Bulgaria	Visa not required	90 days	90 days within any 180 day period in the Schengen Area
Burkina Faso	eVisa		
Burundi	Visa on arrival	1 month	
Cambodia	eVisa / Visa on arrival	30 days	Visa is also obtainable online.
Cameroon	eVisa		
Canada	Visa required		Costa Rican citizens who have held a Canadian visa in the last 10 years or who hold a valid United States non-immigrant visa can enter Canada solely with an eTA when arriving by air.
Cape Verde	Visa on arrival		Not available at all entry points.
Central African Republic	Visa required		
Chad	eVisa		
Chile	Visa not required	90 days	
China	Visa required		
Colombia	Visa not required	180 days	90 days - extendable up to 180-days stay within a one-year period
Comoros	Visa on arrival		
Republic of the Congo	Visa required		
Democratic Republic of the Congo	eVisa	7 days	
Côte d'Ivoire	eVisa	90 days	e-Visa holders must arrive via Port Bouet Airport.
Croatia	Visa not required	90 days	90 days within any 180 day period in the Schengen Area
Cuba	eVisa	90 days	Extendable up to 60 days with fee
Cyprus	Visa not required	90 days	90 days within any 180 day period
Czech Republic	Visa not required	90 days	90 days within any 180 day period in the Schengen Area
Denmark	Visa not required	90 days	90 days within any 180 day period in the Schengen Area
Djibouti	eVisa	31 days	
Dominica	Visa not required	6 months	
Dominican Republic	Visa not required	90 days	
Ecuador	Visa not required	90 days	
Egypt	Visa on arrival	30 days	Nationals of Costa Rica with a normal passport can obtain a visa on arrival for a maximum stay of 30 days. They can apply to extend their stay.
El Salvador	Visa not required	3 months	
Equatorial Guinea	eVisa	90 days	
Eritrea	Visa required		
Estonia	Visa not required	90 days	90 days within any 180 day period in the Schengen Area
Eswatini	Visa required		
Ethiopia	eVisa	up to 90 days	eVisa holders must arrive via Addis Ababa Bole International Airport
Fiji	Visa required		
Finland	Visa not required	90 days	90 days within any 180 day period in the Schengen Area
France and territories	Visa not required	90 days	90 days within any 180 day period in the Schengen Area
Gabon	eVisa		Electronic visa holders must arrive via Libreville International Airport.
Gambia	Visa not required		An entry clearance must be obtained from the Gambian Immigration prior to travel.
Georgia	Visa not required	1 year	
Germany	Visa not required	90 days	90 days within any 180 day period in the Schengen Area
Ghana	Visa required		
Greece	Visa not required	90 days	90 days within any 180 day period in the Schengen Area
Grenada	Visa not required		
Guatemala	Visa not required	90 days	
Guinea	eVisa		
Guinea-Bissau	Visa on arrival	90 days	
Guyana	Visa not required	30 days	
Haiti	Visa not required	90 days	
Honduras	Visa not required	90 days	Starting October 25, 2023, Costa Rican citizens who wish to enter Honduras must present a criminal record certificate.
Hungary	Visa not required	90 days	90 days within any 180 day period in the Schengen Area
Iceland	Visa not required	90 days	90 days within any 180 day period in the Schengen Area
India	eVisa	60 days	e-Visa holders must arrive via 32 designated airports (Note: Ahmedabad; Amritsar; Bagdogra; Bengaluru; Bhubaneswar; Chandigarh; Chennai; Coimbatore; Delhi; Gaya; Goa-Dabolim; Goa-Manohar; Guwahati; Hyderabad; Indore; Jaipur; Kannur; Kochi; Kolkata; Kozhikode; Lucknow; Madurai; Mangaluru; Mumbai; Nagpur; Port Blair; Pune; Surat; Thiruvananthapuram; Tiruchirappalli; Varanasi; Visakhapatnam) or 5 designated seaports. (Note: Chennai; Cochin; Mormugao (Goa); Mumbai; Mangalore); An Indian e-Tourist Visa may only be obtained twice within 1 calendar year.; Foreigners of Pakistani origin or who hold a Pakistani Passport are not eligible for an e-Visa. Foreigners who are not Pakistani nationals, but whose parents or grandparents (either paternal or maternal) were born in, or were permanent residents in Pakistan, are also not eligible for an e-Visa.
Indonesia	Visa required		
Iran	eVisa/Visa on arrival	30 days	
Iraq	eVisa		
Ireland	Visa not required	3 months	
Israel	Electronic Travel Authorization	3 months	
Italy	Visa not required	90 days	90 days within any 180 day period in the Schengen Area
Jamaica	Visa not required	30 days	
Japan	Visa not required	90 days	
Jordan	eVisa / Visa on arrival		Conditions apply.; Not available at all entry points.
Kazakhstan	eVisa		
Kenya	Electronic Travel Authorisation	3 months	Applications can be submitted up to 90 days prior to travel and must be submitted at least 3 days in advance.; eTA fee is 32.50 USD.; Proof of reservation at the hotel where visitors plan to stay is required (if staying with friends, an invitation letter is also acceptable).; Yellow fever vaccination certificate is required if coming from endemic countries.; Can also be entered on an East Africa tourist visa issued by Rwanda or Uganda.
Kiribati	Visa not required	90 days	
North Korea	Visa required		
South Korea	K-ETA	90 days	
Kuwait	Visa required		e-Visa can be obtained for holders of a Residence Permit issued by a GCC member state under the following conditions: To be 18 years old and over.; The residence permit for a GCC state must be valid for at least another 3 months.; To be accompanied by the sponsor of the residence permit if the sponsor is an individual.; Does not apply to holders of a GCC Student Visa and Non-Skilled Worker Visa
Kyrgyzstan	eVisa	30 days or 60 days	Electronic visa holders must arrive via Manas International Airport or Osh Airport or through land crossings with China (at Irkeshtam and Torugart), Kazakhstan (at Ak-jol, Ak-Tilek, Chaldybar, Chon-Kapka), Tajikistan (at Bor-Dobo, Kulundu, Kyzyl-Bel) and Uzbekistan (at Dostuk).
Laos	eVisa / Visa on arrival	30 days	18 (Note: Savannakhet Airport; Lanetoui - Mengkang (China); Meuangmom - Wan Pong (Myanmar); Banvang - Ban Khok Phai (Thailand); Namngeun - Huay Kon (Thailand); Paksan - Bueng Kan (Thailand); Paktaphan - Pak Saeng (Thailand); Pangmon - Ban Huak (Thailand); Phoudou (Thailand); Dak ta ock - Nam Giang (Vietnam); La Lai (Vietnam); Namkan (Vietnam); Namphao - Cau Treo (Vietnam); Namsoy - Na Meo (Vietnam); Naphao - Cha Lo (Vietnam); Pahang - Long Sap (Vietnam); Panghok - Tây Trang (Vietnam); Phoukeua - Bo Y (Vietnam)) of the 33 border crossings are only open to regular visa holders.; e-Visa may be used to enter Laos through the Luang Prabang, Pakse and Vientiane international airports, 3 Thai-Lao Friendship Bridges (Note: Vientiane (Friendship Bridge 1); Savannakhet (Friendship Bridge 2); Bokeo (Friendship Bridge 4)), in Boten (road and railroad), and in Vientiane (at Khamsavath railway station).; Visa on arrival is available at the Luang Prabang, Pakse and Vientiane international airports, 4 Thai-Lao Friendship Bridges (Note: Vientiane (Friendship Bridge 1); Savannakhet (Friendship Bridge 2); Khammouane (Friendship Bridge 3); Bokeo (Friendship Bridge 4)) and 7 border crossings. (Note: Nongnokkheane - Trapeang Kriel (Cambodia); Boten - Bo han (China); Golden Triangle/Samliemkham (Thailand); Khamsavath railway station (Thailand); Namheuang - Ban Na Kraseng (Thailand); Vang tao - Chongmek (Thailand); Dansavan - Lao Bảo (Vietnam))
Latvia	Visa not required	90 days	90 days within any 180 day period in the Schengen Area
Lebanon	Free visa on arrival	1 month	1 month extendable for 2 additional months; Granted free of charge at Beirut International Airport or any other port of entry if there is no Israeli visa or seal, holding a telephone number, an address in Lebanon, and a non refundable return of circle trip ticket.
Lesotho	eVisa		
Liberia	eVisa		
Libya	eVisa		
Liechtenstein	Visa not required	90 days	90 days within any 180 day period in the Schengen Area
Lithuania	Visa not required	90 days	90 days within any 180 day period in the Schengen Area
Luxembourg	Visa not required	90 days	90 days within any 180 day period in the Schengen Area
Madagascar	eVisa / Visa on arrival	90 days	
Malawi	eVisa / Visa on arrival	30 days	
Malaysia	Visa not required	1 month	
Maldives	Free visa on arrival	30 days	
Mali	Visa required		
Malta	Visa not required	90 days	90 days within any 180 day period in the Schengen Area
Marshall Islands	Visa on arrival	90 days	
Mauritania	eVisa		
Mauritius	Visa not required	90 days	
Mexico	Visa not required	180 days	
Micronesia	Visa not required	30 days	
Moldova	Visa not required	90 days	90 days within any 180 day period
Monaco	Visa not required		
Mongolia	eVisa	30 days	
Montenegro	Visa not required	90 days	90 days within any 180 day period
Morocco	Visa required		May apply for an e-Visa if holding a valid visa or a residency document issued by one of the following countries: Schengen Area, Australia, Canada, Ireland, New Zealand, United Kingdom, United States a residency document issued by Cyprus, Japan, United Arab Emirates.
Mozambique	eVisa / Visa on arrival	30 days	Conditions apply
Myanmar	eVisa	28 days	eVisa holders must arrive via Yangon, Nay Pyi Taw or Mandalay airports or via land border crossings with Thailand — Tachileik, Myawaddy and Kawthaung or India — Rih Khaw Dar and Tamu.; eVisa is available for tourism only.
Namibia	eVisa		
Nauru	Visa required		
Nepal	eVisa / Visa on arrival	90 days	
Netherlands	Visa not required	90 days	90 days within any 180 day period in the Schengen Area
New Zealand	Visa required		May transit without visa if transit is through Auckland Airport and for no longer than 24 hours, subject to meeting character requirements and obtaining an Electronic Travel Authority prior to departure.; Holders of an Australian Permanent Resident Visa or Resident Return Visa may be granted a New Zealand Resident Visa on arrival permitting indefinite stay (pursuant to the Trans-Tasman Travel Arrangement), subject to meeting character requirements and obtaining an Electronic Travel Authority prior to departure.
Nicaragua	Visa not required	90 days	
Niger	Visa required		
Nigeria	eVisa	90 days	
North Macedonia	Visa not required	90 days	90 days within 180 days
Norway	Visa not required	90 days	90 days within any 180 day period in the Schengen Area
Oman	Visa required		
Pakistan	Electronic Travel Authorization		Electronic Travel Authorization to obtain a visa on arrival for tourism purposes.; Electronic Travel Authorization to obtain a visa on arrival for business purposes.; Online Visa eligible.
Palau	Free visa on arrival	30 days	Extendable twice only with fee
Panama	Visa not required	180 days	
Papua New Guinea	eVisa	60 days	
Paraguay	Visa not required	90 days	
Peru	Visa not required	90 days	
Philippines	Visa not required	30 days	
Poland	Visa not required	90 days	90 days within any 180 day period in the Schengen Area
Portugal	Visa not required	90 days	90 days within any 180 day period in the Schengen Area
Qatar	Visa not required	30 days	
Romania	Visa not required	90 days	90 days within any 180 day period in the Schengen Area
Russia	Visa not required	90 days	90 days within any 180 day period
Rwanda	eVisa / Visa on arrival	30 days	
Saint Kitts and Nevis	Electronic Travel Authorisation	3 months	
Saint Lucia	Visa not required	6 weeks	
Saint Vincent and the Grenadines	Visa not required	1 month	
Samoa	Visa not required	60 days	
San Marino	Visa not required		
São Tomé and Príncipe	eVisa	15 days	
Saudi Arabia	Visa required		Tourist visa on arrival for holders of a valid multiple entry visa from US, UK or Schengen area, under the condition that the multiple entry visa has been used at least once, proving that by showing the entry and exit stamps of the country of issuance.
Senegal	Visa on arrival	90 days	
Serbia	Visa not required	90 days	
Seychelles	Free Visitor's Permit on arrival	3 months	
Sierra Leone	eVisa		
Singapore	Visa not required	30 days	
Slovakia	Visa not required	90 days	90 days within any 180 day period in the Schengen Area
Slovenia	Visa not required	90 days	90 days within any 180 day period in the Schengen Area
Solomon Islands	Visitor's permit on arrival	3 months	
Somalia	eVisa	30 days	
South Africa	Visa not required	30 days	
South Sudan	eVisa		Obtainable online.; Printed visa authorization must be presented at the time of travel.
Spain	Visa not required	90 days	90 days within any 180 day period in the Schengen Area
Sri Lanka	ETA / Visa on arrival	30 days	The standard visitor visa allows a stay of 60 days within any 6-month period.; Visa fees (for Standard visitor visa): SAARC - USD 35; Non SAARC - USD 75; e-Visa categories will be charged an additional USD 18.50 service fee.; If transiting from any of the Sri Lankan airports, An e-Visa is exempted (2 day transit period).
Sudan	Visa required		
Suriname	E-tourist card	90 days	Multiple entry eVisa is also available.
Sweden	Visa not required	90 days	90 days within any 180 day period in the Schengen Area
Switzerland	Visa not required	90 days	90 days within any 180 day period in the Schengen Area
Syria	eVisa		
Tajikistan	Visa not required	30 days	
Tanzania	eVisa / Visa on arrival		
Thailand	eVisa / visa on arrival	15 days	
Timor-Leste	Visa on arrival	30 days	Not available at all entry points.
Togo	eVisa	15 days	
Tonga	Visa required		
Trinidad and Tobago	Visa not required	90 days	
Tunisia	Visa not required	90 days	
Turkey	Visa not required	30 days	
Turkmenistan	Visa required		
Tuvalu	Visa on arrival	1 month	
Uganda	eVisa / Visa on arrival		Determined at the port of entry.; May apply online.
Ukraine	eVisa		
United Arab Emirates	Visa not required	90 days	
United Kingdom	Electronic Travel Authorisation	6 months	
United States	Visa required		
Uruguay	Visa not required	90 days	
Uzbekistan	Visa not required	30 days	
Vanuatu	eVisa		
Vatican City	Visa not required		
Venezuela	Visa not required	90 days	
Vietnam	eVisa	90 days	Phú Quốc without a visa for up to 30 days.
Yemen	Visa required		
Zambia	Visa not required	90 days	
Zimbabwe	eVisa / Visa on arrival		

== Dependent, disputed, or restricted territories ==
=== Unrecognized or partially recognized countries ===
Territory	Conditions of access	Notes
Abkhazia	Visa required	
Kosovo	Visa not required	90 days
Northern Cyprus	Visa not required	up to 90 days
Palestine	Visa not required	Arrival by sea to Gaza Strip not allowed.
Sahrawi Arab Democratic Republic		Undefined visa regime in the Western Sahara controlled territory.
Somaliland	Visa on arrival	30 days for 30 USD, payable on arrival.
South Ossetia	Visa not required	
Taiwan	Visa required	Exempt for stays of up to 90 days for holders of an APEC Business Travel Card (ABTC) with local pre-clearance.
Transnistria	Visa not required	Registration required after 24 hours.

=== Dependent and autonomous territories ===
Territory	Conditions of access	Notes
Hong Kong	Visa not required	30 days
Macau	Visa on arrival	30 days
Denmark
Faroe Islands	Visa not required	
Greenland	Visa not required	
France
Clipperton Island	Special permit required	
French Guiana	Visa not required	Visa free for 3 months within any 6-month period for each territory.
French Polynesia	Visa not required	Visa free for 3 months within any 6-month period for each territory.
Guadeloupe	Visa not required	Visa free for 3 months within any 6-month period for each territory.
Martinique	Visa not required	Visa free for 3 months within any 6-month period for each territory.
Saint Barthélemy	Visa not required	Visa free for 3 months within any 6-month period for each territory.
Saint Martin	Visa not required	Visa free for 3 months within any 6-month period for each territory.
Mayotte	Visa not required	Visa free for 3 months within any 6-month period for each territory.
New Caledonia	Visa not required	Visa free for 3 months within any 6-month period for each territory.
Réunion	Visa not required	Visa free for 3 months within any 6-month period for each territory.
Saint Pierre and Miquelon	Visa not required	Visa free for 3 months within any 6-month period for each territory.
Wallis and Futuna	Visa not required	Visa free for 3 months within any 6-month period for each territory.
Netherlands
Aruba	Visa not required	up to 90 days for each territory
Bonaire	Visa not required	up to 90 days for each territory
Sint Eustatius	Visa not required	up to 90 days for each territory
Saba	Visa not required	up to 90 days for each territory
Curaçao	Visa not required	up to 90 days for each territory
Sint Maarten	Visa not required	up to 90 days for each territory
New Zealand
Cook Islands	Visa not required	31 days
Niue	Visa not required	30 days
Tokelau	Permit required	
Norway
(Norway) Jan Mayen	Permit required	Permit issued by the local police required for staying for less than 24 hours and permit issued by the Norwegian police for staying for more than 24 hours.
(Norway) Svalbard	Visa not required	Unlimited period under Svalbard Treaty but it's practically impossible to board a flight/ferry to Svalbard without entering Norway. Hence double entry Schengen visa would be required to go and come back from Svalbard to mainland Norway.
United Kingdom
Akrotiri and Dhekelia	Visa not required	
Anguilla	Visa not required	3 months
Bermuda	Visa not required	up to 6 months, decided on arrival
British Indian Ocean Territory	Special permit required	
British Virgin Islands	Visa not required	up to 6 months
Cayman Islands	Visa not required	6 months
Falkland Islands (Malvinas)	Visa required	
Gibraltar	Visa not required	
Montserrat	Visa not required	6 months
Pitcairn Islands	Visa not required	14 days visa free and landing fee 35 USD or tax of 5 USD if not going ashore.
Saint Helena	Visa not required	
Ascension Island	eVisa	3 months within any year period.
Tristan da Cunha	Permission required	Permission to land required for 15/30 pounds sterling (yacht/ship passenger) for Tristan da Cunha Island or 20 pounds sterling for Gough Island, Inaccessible Island or Nightingale Islands.
South Georgia and the South Sandwich Islands	Permit required	Pre-arrival permit from the Commissioner required (72 hours/1 month for 110/160 pounds sterling).
Turks and Caicos Islands	Visa not required	90 days
United States
American Samoa	Entry permit required	
Guam	Visa required	
Northern Mariana Islands	Visa required	
Puerto Rico	Visa required	
U.S. Virgin Islands	Visa required	
Antarctica and adjacent islands
Special permits required for Bouvet Island, British Antarctic Territory, French Southern and Antarctic Lands, Argentine Antarctica, (Australia) Australian Antarctic Territory, (Antártica Chilena Province) Chilean Antarctic Territory, (Australia) Heard Island and McDonald Islands, (Norway) Peter I Island, (Norway) Queen Maud Land, (New Zealand) Ross Dependency.

==== Other territories ====
- Australia. Ashmore and Cartier Islands - Special authorisation required.
- Belarus. Brest and Grodno - Visa-free for 10 days
- China. Hainan - Visa on arrival for 15 days. Available at Haikou Meilan International Airport and Sanya Phoenix International Airport. Visa not required for 21 days for traveling as part of a tourist group (2 or more people)
- China. Tibet Autonomous Region - Tibet Travel Permit required (10 USD).
- Colombia. San Andrés and Leticia - Visitors arriving at Gustavo Rojas Pinilla International Airport and Alfredo Vásquez Cobo International Airport must buy tourist cards on arrival.
- Ecuador. Galápagos - Online pre-registration is required. Transit Control Card must also be obtained at the airport prior to departure.
- Eritrea outside Asmara – To travel in the rest of the country, a Travel Permit for Foreigners is required (20 Eritrean nakfa).
- Fiji. Lau Province - Special permission required.
- Greece Mount Athos - Special permit required (4 days: 25 euro for Orthodox visitors, 35 euro for non-Orthodox visitors, 18 euro for students). There is a visitors' quota: maximum 100 Orthodox and 10 non-Orthodox per day and women are not allowed.
- India. Protected Area Permit (PAP) required for whole states of Nagaland and Sikkim and parts of states Manipur, Arunachal Pradesh, Uttaranchal, Jammu and Kashmir, Rajasthan, Himachal Pradesh. Restricted Area Permit (RAP) required for all of Andaman and Nicobar Islands and parts of Sikkim. Some of these requirements are occasionally lifted for a year.
- Iran. Kish Island - Visa not required.
- Kazakhstan. Closed cities - Special permission required for the town of Baikonur and surrounding areas in Kyzylorda Oblast, and the town of Gvardeyskiy near Almaty.
- North Korea outside Pyongyang - Special permit required. People are not allowed to leave the capital city, tourists can only leave the capital with a governmental tourist guide (no independent moving).
- Malaysia. Sabah and Sarawak - Visa not required. These states have their own immigration authorities and passport is required to travel to them, however the same visa applies.
- Maldives outside Malé - Permission required. Tourists are generally prohibited from visiting non-resort islands without the express permission of the Government of Maldives.
- Russia. Several closed cities and regions in Russia - Special authorization required.
- Saudi Arabia Mecca and Medina - Special access required. Non-Muslims and those following the Ahmadiyya religious movement are strictly prohibited from entry.
- Sudan. Darfur - Separate travel permit is required.
- Sudan outside Khartoum - All foreigners traveling more than 25 kilometers outside of Khartoum must obtain a travel permit.
- Tajikistan. Gorno-Badakhshan Autonomous Province - OIVR permit required (15+5 Tajikistani Somoni) and another special permit (free of charge) is required for Lake Sarez.
- Turkmenistan. Closed cities - A special permit, issued prior to arrival by Ministry of Foreign Affairs, is required if visiting the following places: Atamurat, Cheleken, Dashoguz, Serakhs and Serhetabat.
- United States. Closed city of Mercury, Nevada, United States - Special authorization is required for entry into Mercury.
- United States. United States Minor Outlying Islands - Special permits required for Baker Island, Howland Island, Jarvis Island, Johnston Atoll, Kingman Reef, Midway Atoll, Palmyra Atoll and Wake Island.
- Venezuela. Margarita Island - Visa not required. All visitors are fingerprinted.
- Vietnam. Phú Quốc - Visa not required for 30 days.
- Yemen outside Sana'a or Aden - Special permission needed for travel outside Sana'a or Aden.
- (United Nations) UN Buffer Zone in Cyprus - Access Permit is required for travelling inside the zone, except Civil Use Areas.
- (United Nations) Korean Demilitarized Zone - Restricted area.
- (United Nations) UNDOF Zone and Ghajar - Restricted area.

== Non-visa restrictions ==
=== Blank passport pages ===
Many countries require a minimum number of blank pages to be available in the passport being presented, typically one or two pages. Endorsement pages, which often appear after the visa pages, are not counted as being valid or available.

=== Vaccination ===
Cover of the new International Certificate of Vaccination issued by the Bureau of Quarantine in the Philippines since 2021

The African countries of Angola, Benin, Burkina Faso, Burundi, Cameroon, Central African Republic, Democratic Republic of the Congo, Republic of the Congo, Côte d'Ivoire, Gabon, Ghana, Guinea-Bissau, Mali, Niger, Sierra Leone and Togo, South Sudan and Uganda, along with French Guiana in South America, require all incoming passengers older than nine months to one year, to have a current International Certificate of Vaccination or Prophylaxis.

Some other countries require vaccination only if the passenger is coming from an infected area or has visited one recently or has transited for 12 hours in those countries: Algeria, Botswana, Cabo Verde, Chad, Djibouti, Egypt, Eswatini, Ethiopia, Gambia, Ghana, Guinea, Lesotho, Libya, Equatorial Guinea, Eritrea, Madagascar, Malawi, Mauritania, Mauritius, Mozambique, Namibia, Nigeria, Papua New Guinea, Seychelles, Somalia, South Africa, Sudan, Tunisia, Uganda, Tanzania, Zambia and Zimbabwe.

=== Passport validity length ===
Very few countries, such as Paraguay, just require a valid passport on arrival.

However many countries and groupings now require only an identity card – especially from their neighbours. Other countries may have special bilateral arrangements that depart from the generality of their passport validity length policies to shorten the period of passport validity required for each other's citizens or even accept passports that have already expired (but not been cancelled).

Some countries, such as Japan, Ireland and the United Kingdom, require a passport valid throughout the period of the intended stay.

In the absence of specific bilateral agreements, countries requiring passports to be valid for at least 6 more months on arrival include Afghanistan, Algeria, Anguilla, Bahrain, Bhutan, Botswana, British Virgin Islands, Brunei, Cambodia, Cameroon, Cape Verde, Cayman Islands, Central African Republic, Chad, Comoros, Costa Rica, Côte d'Ivoire, Curaçao, Ecuador, Egypt, El Salvador, Equatorial Guinea, Fiji, Gabon, Guinea Bissau, Guyana, Haiti, India, Indonesia, Iran, Iraq, Israel, Jordan, Kenya, Kiribati, Kuwait, Laos, Madagascar, Malaysia, Marshall Islands, Mongolia, Myanmar, Namibia, Nepal, Nicaragua, Nigeria, Oman, Palau, Papua New Guinea, Peru, Philippines, Qatar, Rwanda, Samoa, Saudi Arabia, Singapore, Solomon Islands, Somalia, Sri Lanka, Sudan, Suriname, Tanzania, Thailand, Timor-Leste, Tokelau, Tonga, Turkey, Tuvalu, Uganda, United Arab Emirates, Vanuatu, Venezuela, and Vietnam.

Countries requiring passports valid for at least 4 months on arrival include Micronesia and Zambia.

Countries requiring passports with a validity of at least 3 months beyond the date of intended departure include Azerbaijan, Bosnia and Herzegovina, Honduras, Montenegro, Nauru, Moldova and New Zealand. Similarly, the EEA countries of Iceland, Liechtenstein, Norway, all European Union countries (except Ireland) together with Switzerland also require 3 months validity beyond the date of the bearer's intended departure unless the bearer is an EEA or Swiss national.

Countries requiring passports valid for at least 3 months on arrival include Albania, North Macedonia, Panama, and Senegal.

Bermuda requires passports to be valid for at least 45 days upon entry.

Countries that require a passport validity of at least one month beyond the date of intended departure include Eritrea, Hong Kong, Lebanon, Macau, the Maldives and South Africa.

==== Maximum passport age ====
Countries of the Schengen area require non-EU passports to be less than 10 years old upon entry.

=== Criminal record ===
Some countries, including Australia, Canada, Fiji, New Zealand and the United States, routinely deny entry to non-citizens who have a criminal record, while others impose restrictions depending on the type of conviction and the length of the sentence.

=== Persona non grata ===
The government of a country can declare a diplomat persona non grata, banning them from entering the country or expelling them if they have already entered. In non-diplomatic use, the authorities of a country may also declare a foreigner persona non grata permanently or temporarily, usually because of unlawful activity.

=== Israeli stamps ===
Kuwait, Lebanon, Libya, and Yemen do not allow entry to people with passport stamps from Israel or whose passports have either a used or an unused Israeli visa, or where there is evidence of previous travel to Israel such as entry or exit stamps from neighbouring border posts in transit countries such as Jordan and Egypt.

To circumvent this Arab League boycott of Israel, the Israeli immigration services have now mostly ceased to stamp foreign nationals' passports on either entry to or exit from Israel (unless the entry is for some work-related purposes). Since 15 January 2013, Israel no longer stamps foreign passports at Ben Gurion Airport. Passports are still (as of 22 June 2017) stamped at Erez when passing into and out of Gaza.

Iran refuses admission to holders of passports containing an Israeli visa or stamp that is less than 12 months old.

=== Biometrics ===
Several countries mandate that all travellers, or all foreign travellers, be fingerprinted on arrival and will refuse admission to or even arrest travellers who refuse to comply. In some countries, such as the United States, this may apply even to transit passengers who merely wish to change planes rather than go landside.

Fingerprinting countries/regions include Afghanistan, Argentina, Brunei, Cambodia, China, Ethiopia, Ghana, Guinea, India, Japan, Kenya (both fingerprints and a photo are taken), Malaysia upon entry and departure, Mongolia, Saudi Arabia, the Schengen Area, Singapore, South Korea, Taiwan, Thailand, Uganda, the United Arab Emirates and the United States.

Many countries also require a photo be taken of people entering the country. The United States, which does not fully implement exit control formalities at its land frontiers (although long mandated by its own legislation), intends to implement facial recognition for passengers departing from international airports to identify people who overstay their visa.

Together with fingerprint and face recognition, iris scanning is one of three biometric identification technologies internationally standardised since 2006 by the International Civil Aviation Organization (ICAO) for use in e-passports and the United Arab Emirates conducts iris scanning on visitors who need to apply for a visa. The United States Department of Homeland Security has announced plans to greatly increase the biometric data it collects at US borders. In 2018, Singapore began trials of iris scanning at three land and maritime immigration checkpoints.

== See also ==
- Visa policy of Costa Rica
- Costa Rican passport
