= List of diplomatic missions of Costa Rica =

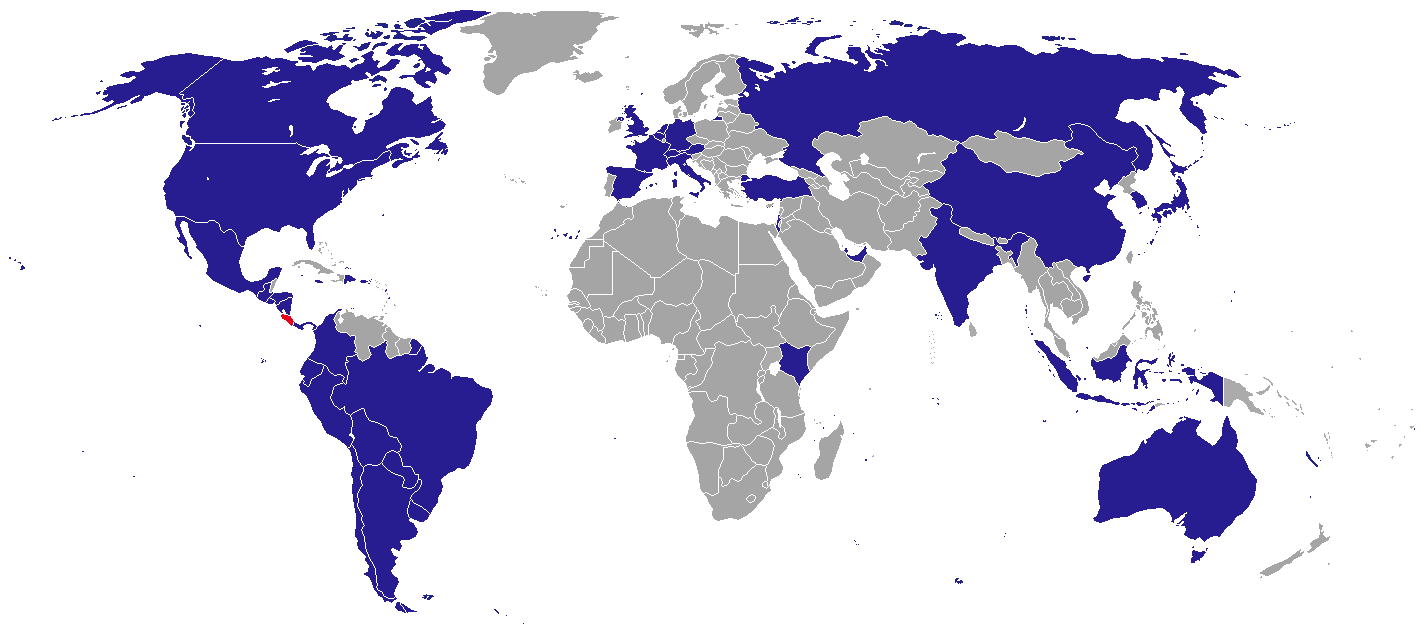
Countries with Costa Rican diplomatic missions

This is a list of diplomatic missions of Costa Rica. Costa Rica is one of the more developed countries in Latin America, and has a moderate sized number of diplomatic missions abroad.

== Current missions ==
=== Africa ===
Host country	Host city	Mission	Concurrent accreditation	Ref.
Kenya	Nairobi	Embassy	Country: Ethiopia; Tanzania; International Organizations: United Nations	

=== Americas ===
Host country	Host city	Mission	Concurrent accreditation	Ref.
Argentina	Buenos Aires	Embassy		
Bolivia	La Paz	Embassy		
Brazil	Brasília	Embassy		
Canada	Ottawa	Embassy		
Chile	Santiago de Chile	Embassy		
Colombia	Bogotá	Embassy		
Dominican Republic	Santo Domingo	Embassy	Country: Haiti	
Ecuador	Quito	Embassy		
El Salvador	San Salvador	Embassy	Country: Belize	
Guatemala	Guatemala City	Embassy		
Honduras	Tegucigalpa	Embassy		
Jamaica	Kingston	Embassy		
Mexico	Mexico City	Embassy		
Nicaragua	Managua	Embassy		
Panama	Panama City	Embassy		
Panama	David	Consulate		
Peru	Lima	Embassy		
United States	Washington, D.C.	Embassy		
United States	Atlanta	Consulate-General		
United States	Houston	Consulate-General		
United States	Los Angeles	Consulate-General		
United States	Miami	Consulate-General		
United States	New York City	Consulate-General		
Uruguay	Montevideo	Embassy		

=== Asia ===
Host country	Host city	Mission	Concurrent accreditation	Ref.
China	Beijing	Embassy		
China	Shanghai	Consulate-General		
India	New Delhi	Embassy		
Indonesia	Jakarta	Embassy		
Israel	Tel Aviv	Embassy		
Japan	Tokyo	Embassy		
Qatar	Doha	Embassy		
Singapore	Singapore	Embassy	Countries: Brunei; Vietnam	
South Korea	Seoul	Embassy	Countries: Malaysia	
Turkey	Ankara	Embassy		
United Arab Emirates	Abu Dhabi	Embassy	Countries: Jordan; Saudi Arabia	

=== Europe ===
Host country	Host city	Mission	Concurrent accreditation	Ref.
Austria	Vienna	Embassy	International Organizations: Comprehensive Nuclear-Test-Ban Treaty Organization; International Atomic Energy Agency; United Nations	
Belgium	Brussels	Embassy	Country: Luxembourg; International Organizations: European Union	
France	Paris	Embassy	Countries: Ivory Coast; Monaco; International Organizations: UNESCO	
Germany	Berlin	Embassy		
Holy See (Note: The Costa Rican Embassy to the Holy See is located outside Vatican territory in Rome.)	Rome	Embassy	Sovereign entity: Sovereign Military Order of Malta; International Organizations: Food and Agriculture Organization	
Italy	Rome	Embassy	Country: Bulgaria	
Netherlands	The Hague	Embassy		
Russia	Moscow	Embassy		
Spain	Madrid	Embassy	Country: Andorra	
Switzerland	Bern	Embassy	Countries: Liechtenstein; Poland	
United Kingdom	London	Embassy		

=== Oceania ===
Host country	Host city	Mission	Concurrent accreditation	Ref.
Australia	Canberra	Embassy	Country: New Zealand	

=== Multilateral organizations ===
Organization	Host city	Host country	Mission	Concurrent accreditation	Ref.
Organization of American States	Washington, D.C.	United States	Permanent Mission		
United Nations	New York City	United States	Permanent Mission		
United Nations	Geneva	Switzerland	Permanent Mission		

== Gallery ==
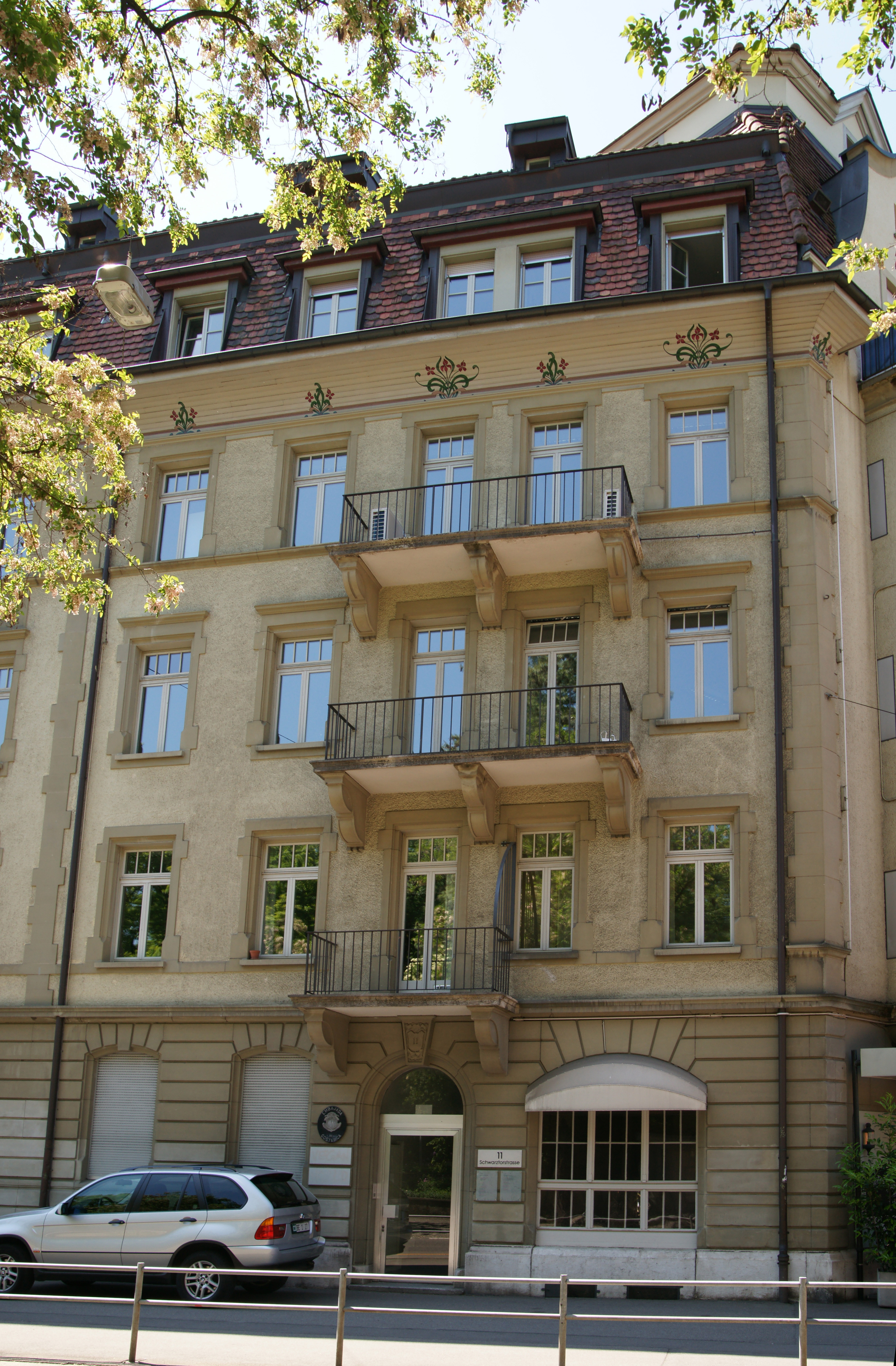
Embassy in Bern

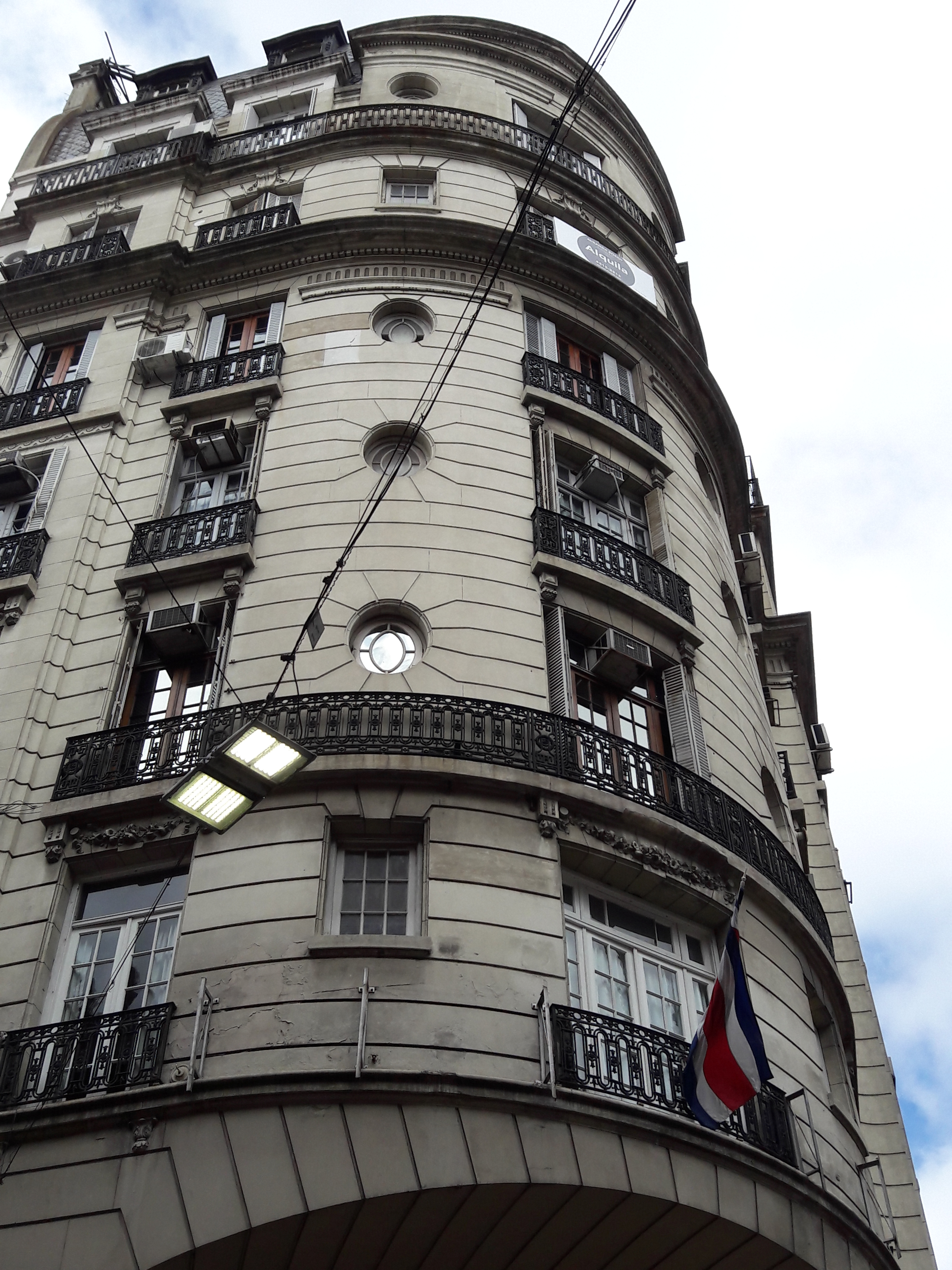
Embassy in Buenos Aires

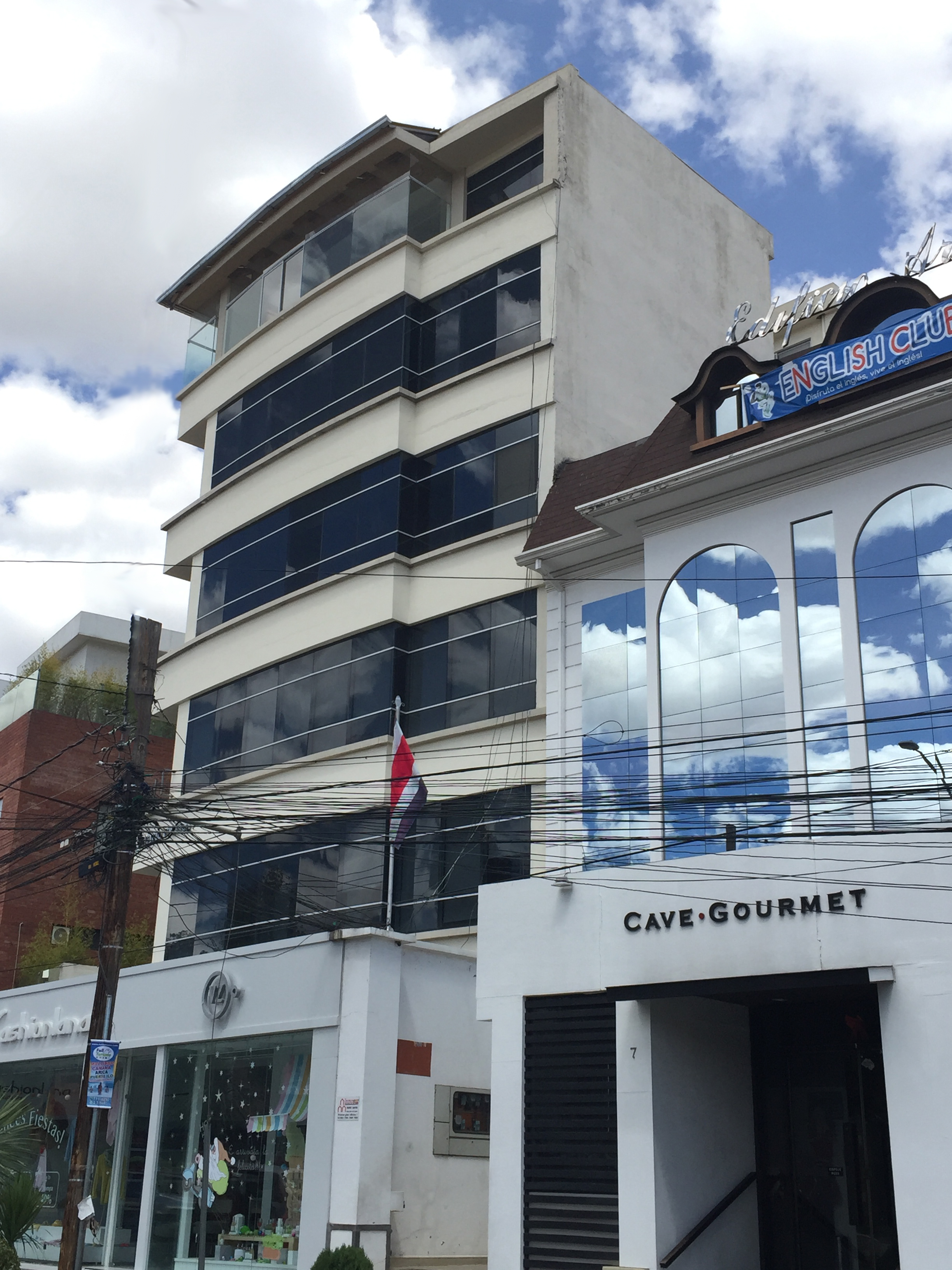
Embassy in La Paz

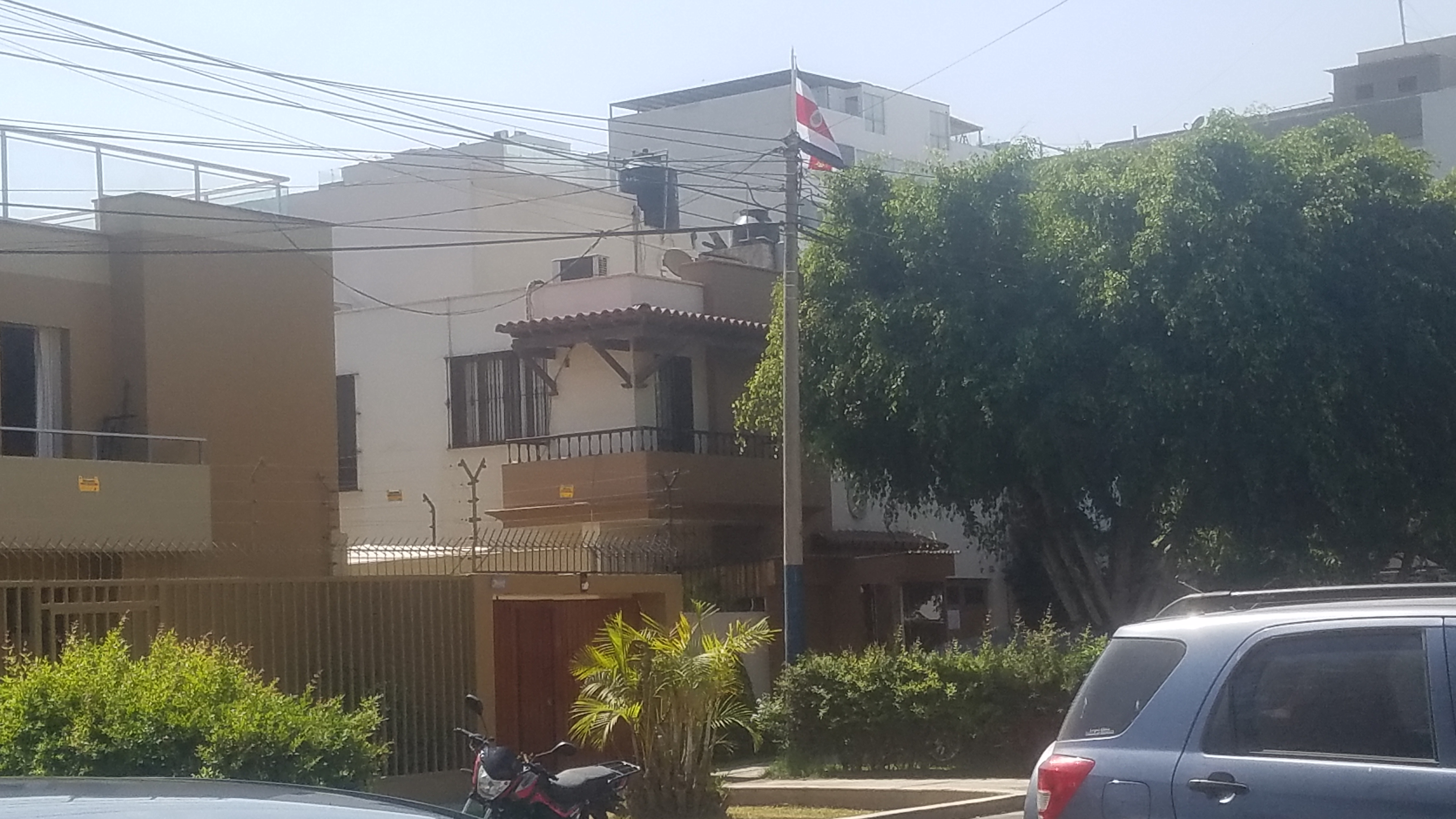
Embassy in Lima

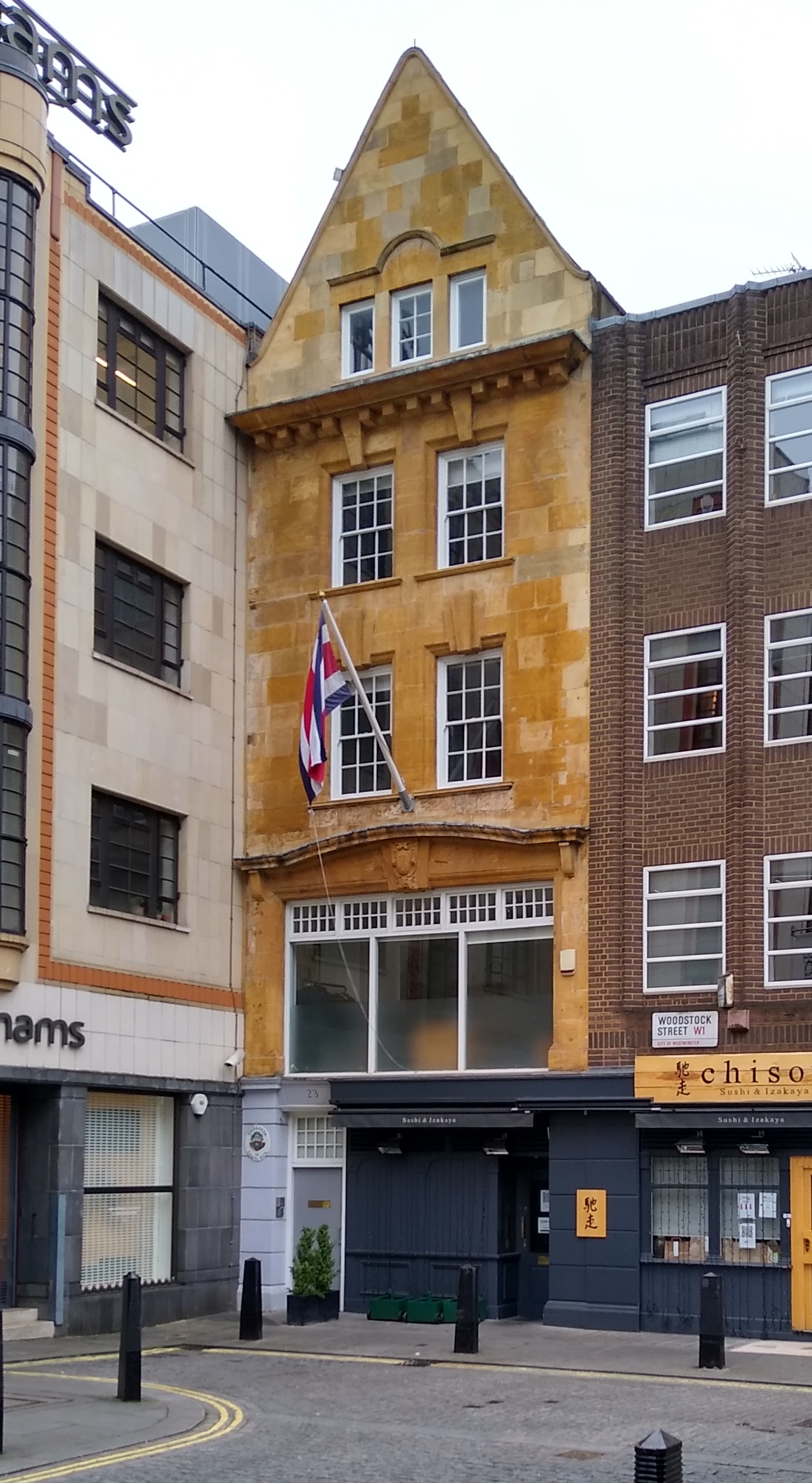
Embassy in London

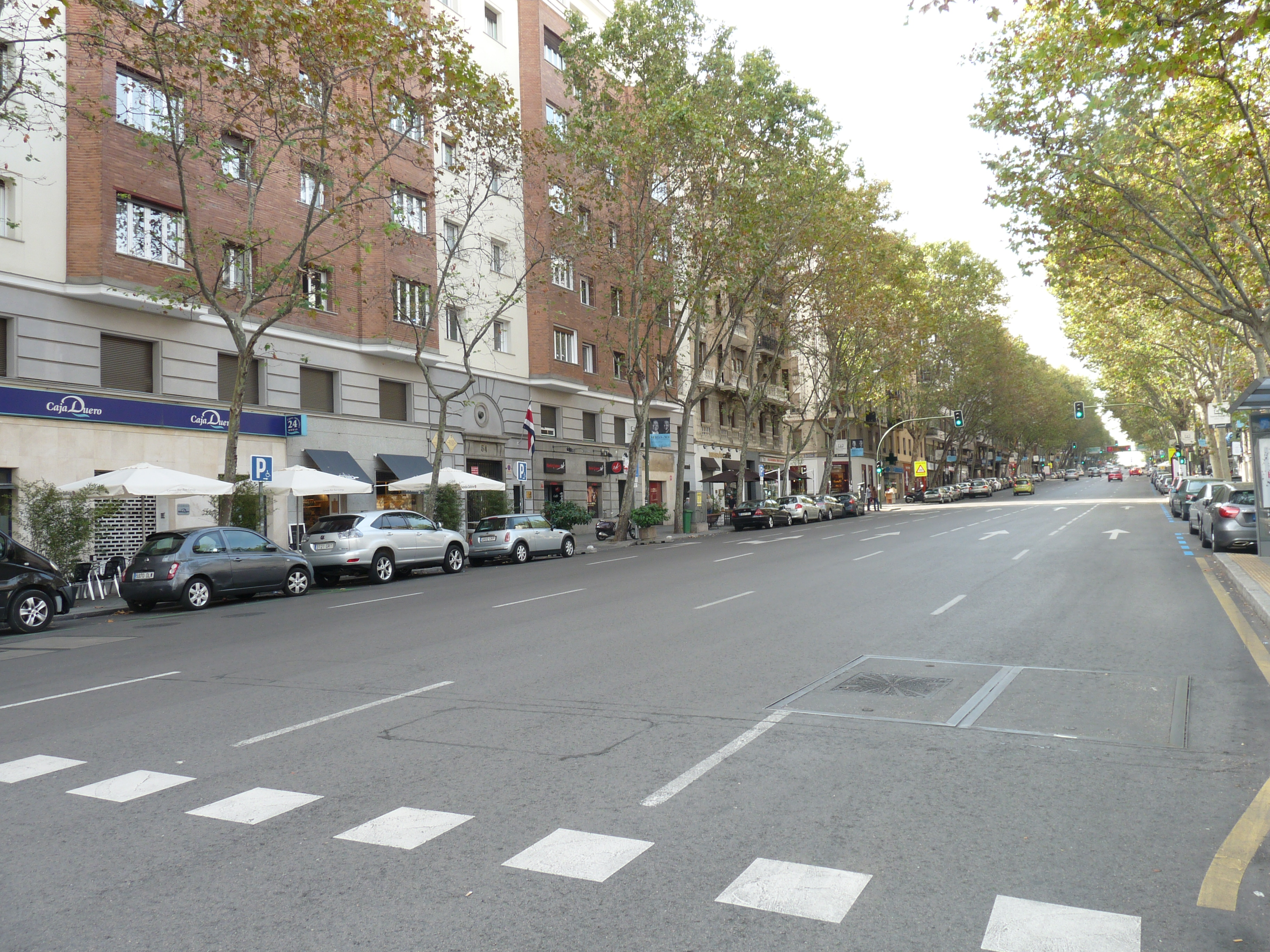
Embassy in Madrid

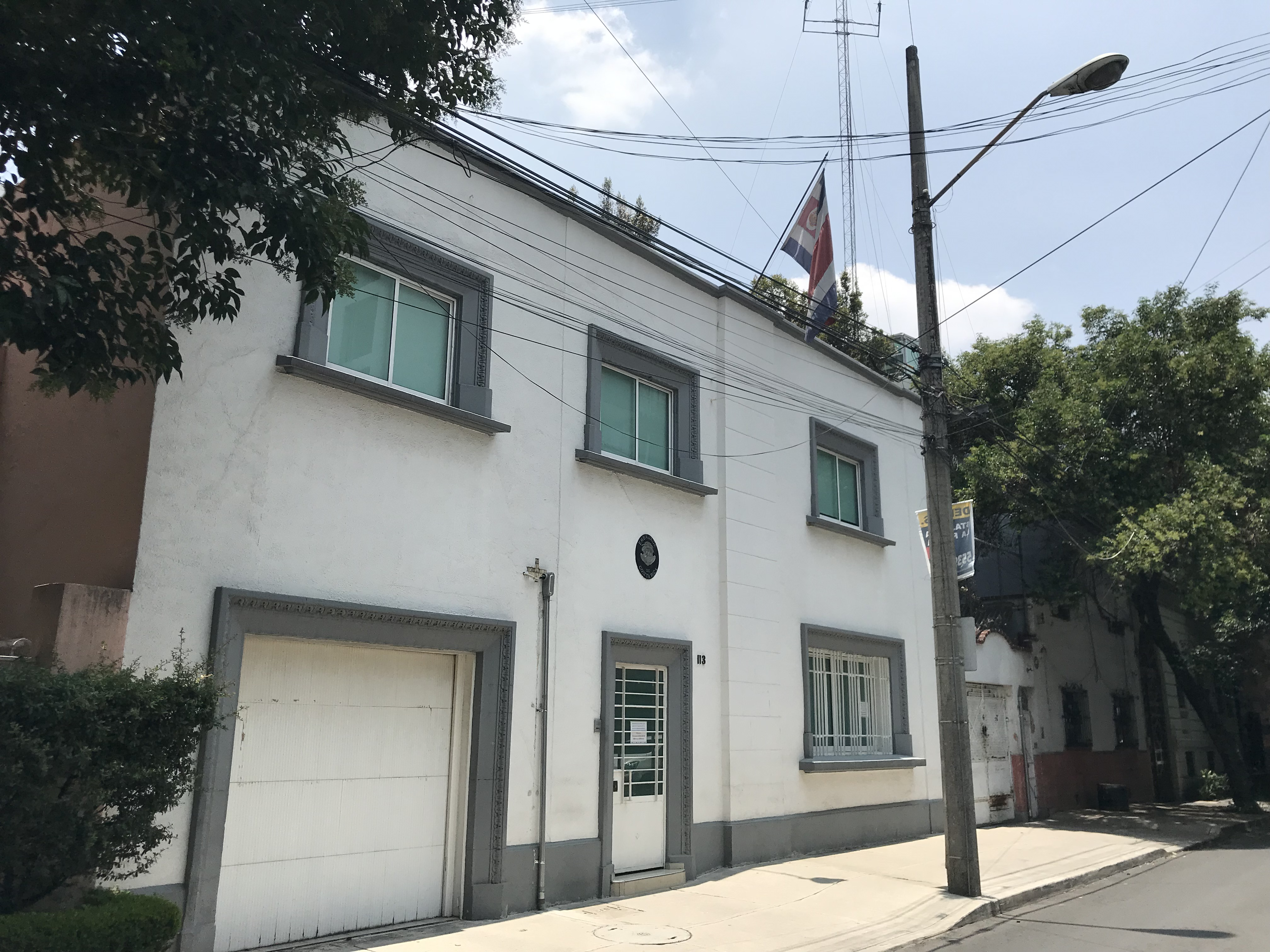
Embassy in Mexico City

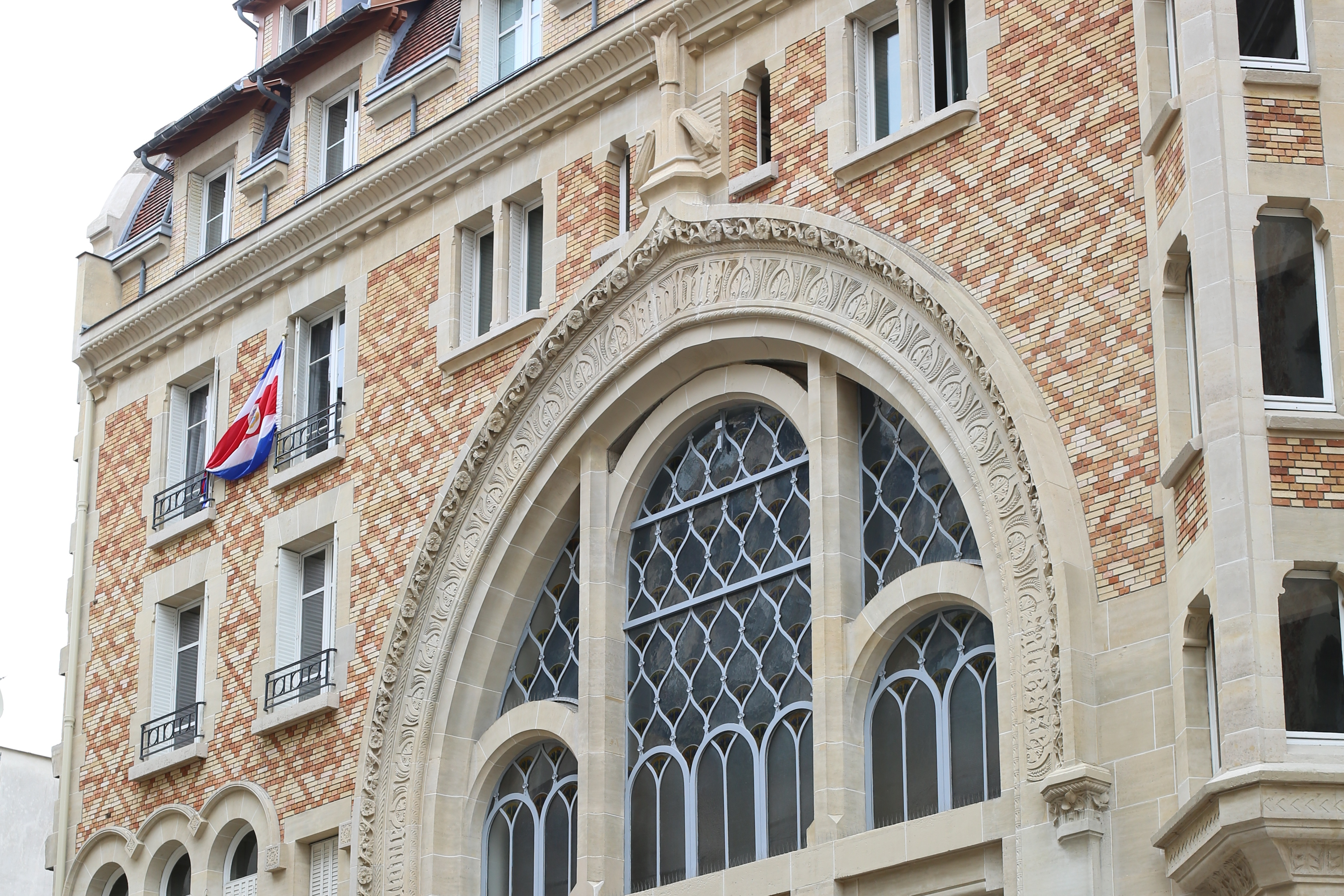
Embassy in Paris

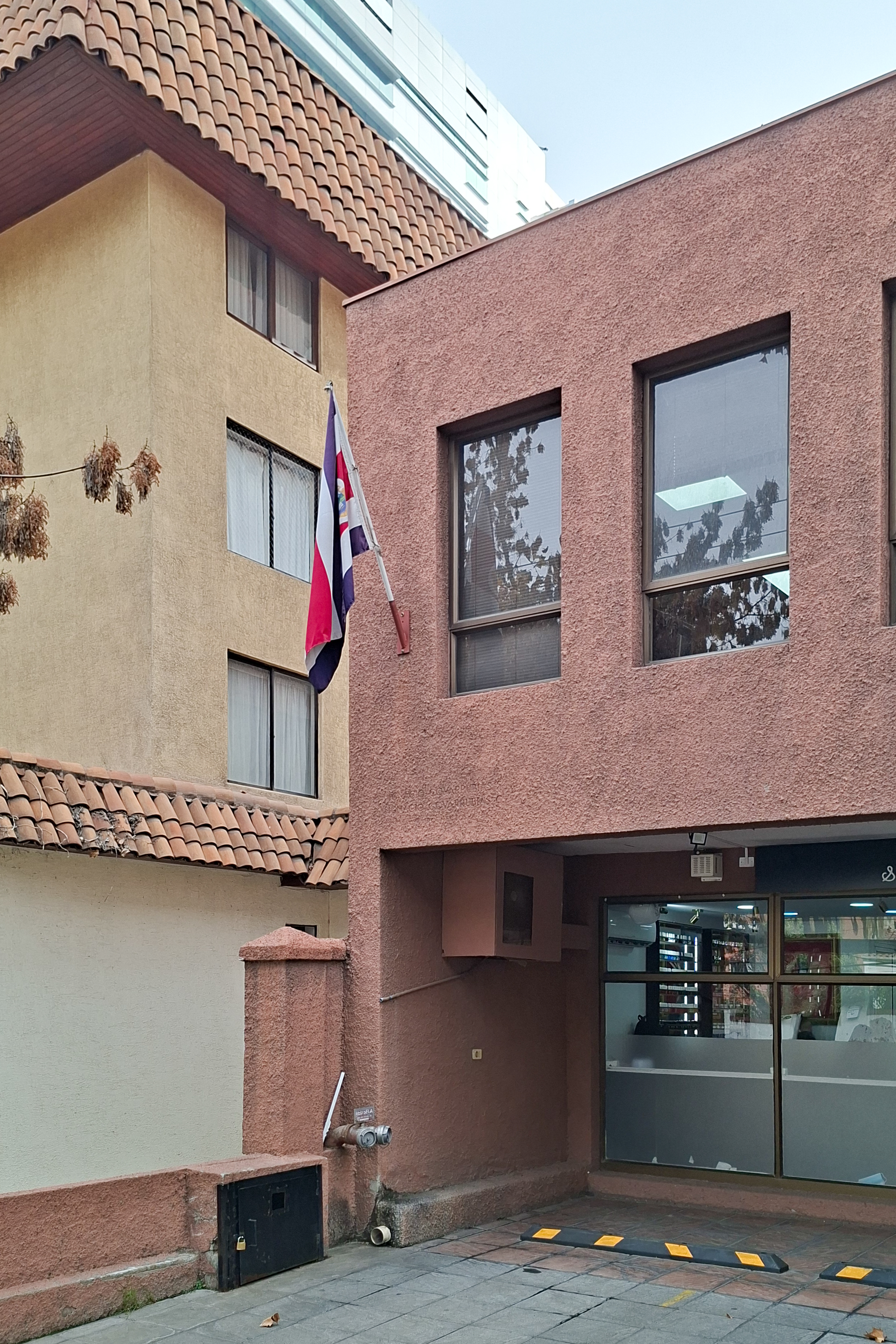
Embassy in Santiago

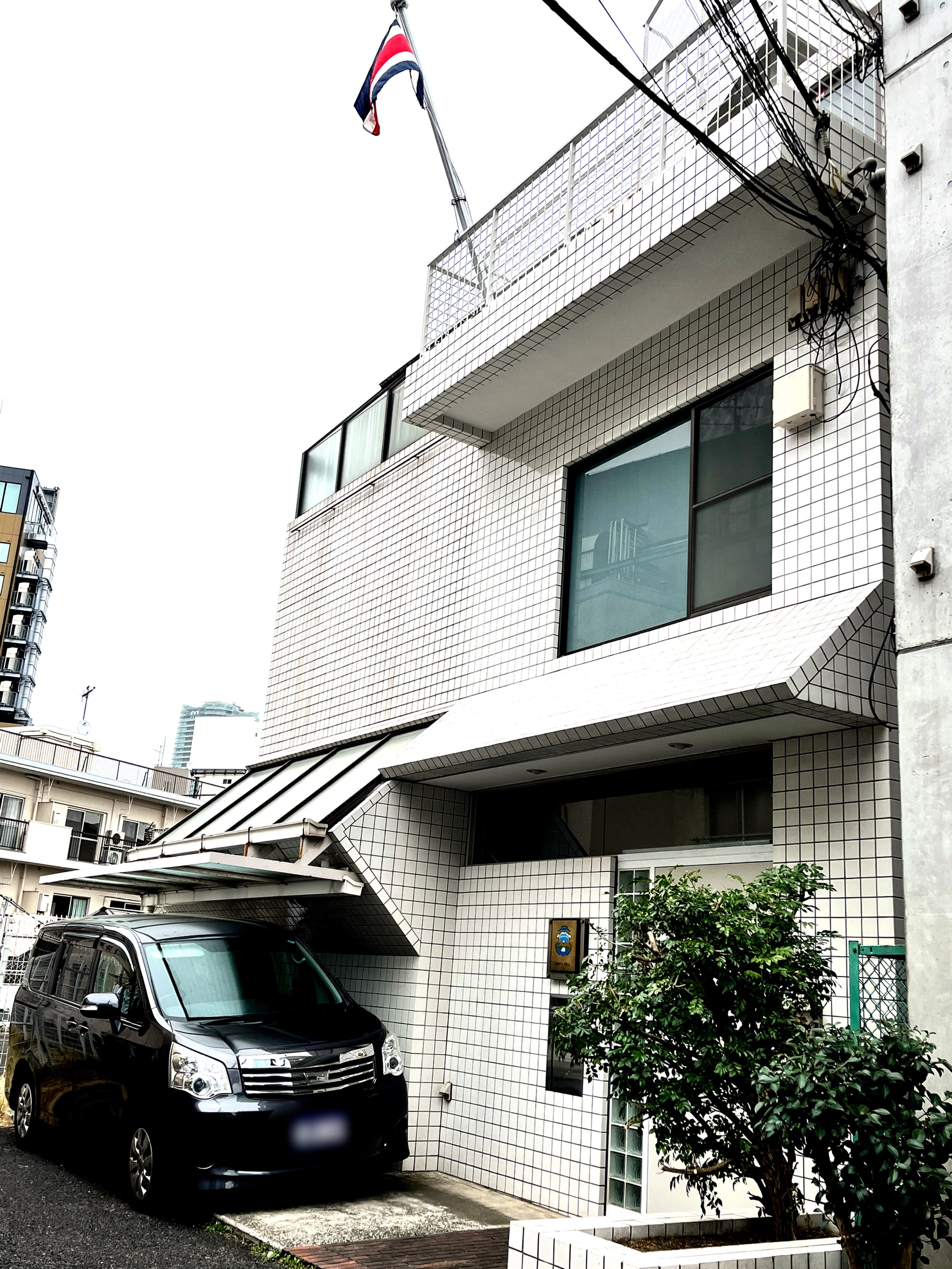
Embassy in Tokyo

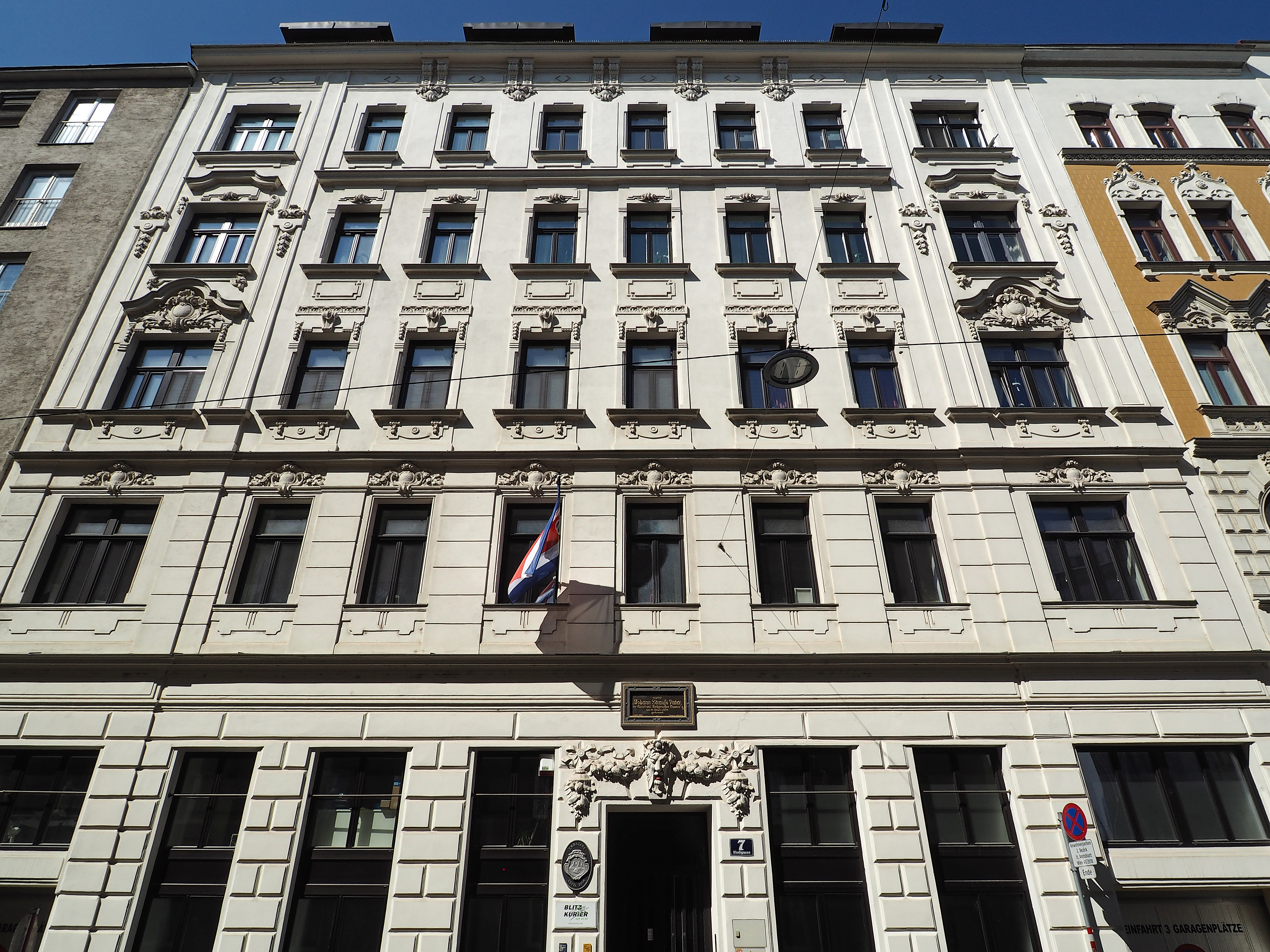
Embassy in Vienna

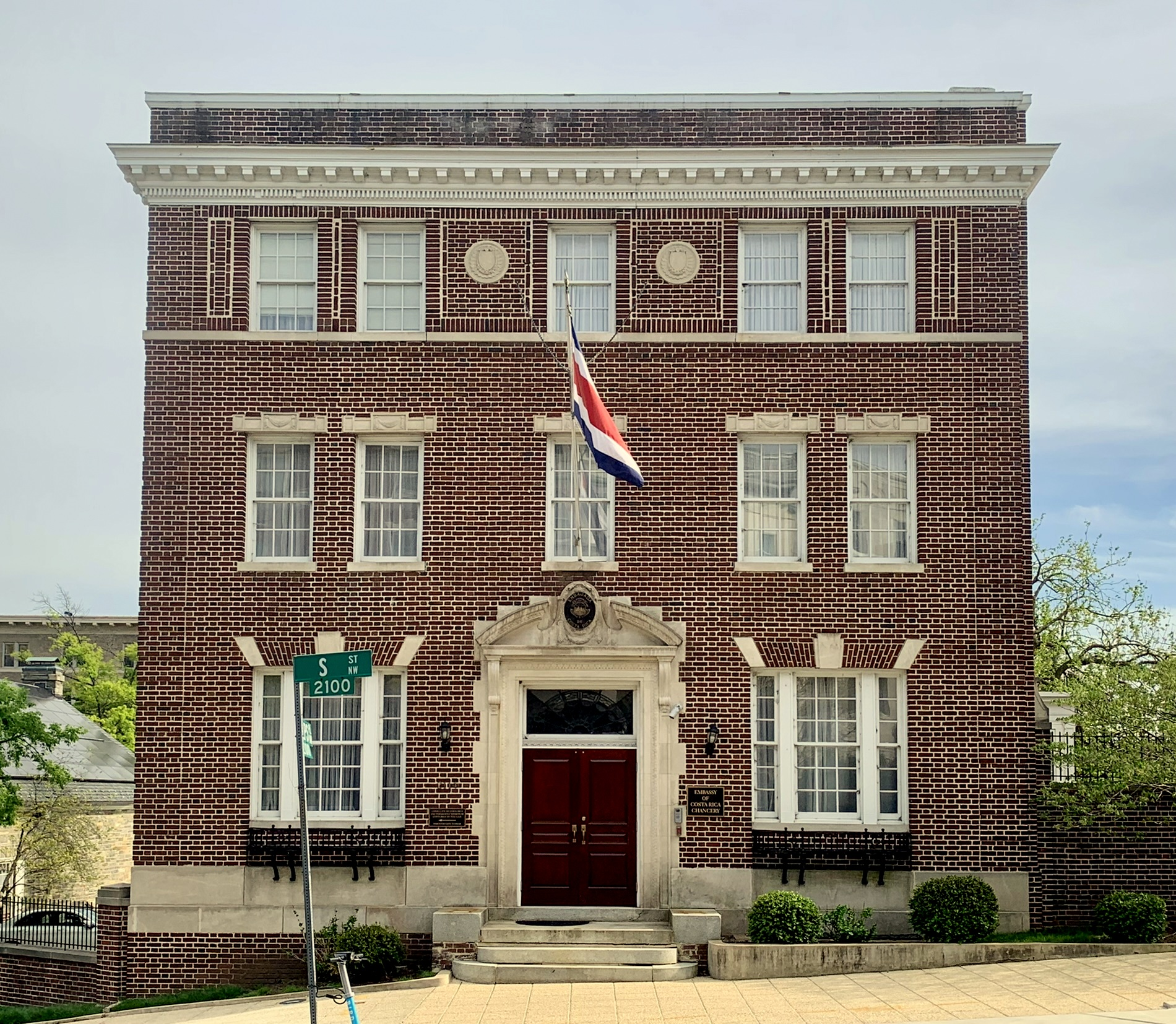
Embassy in Washington, D.C.

== Closed missions ==
=== Africa ===
Host country	Host city	Mission level	Year closed	Ref.
Egypt	Cairo	Embassy	1984	

=== Americas ===
Host country	Host city	Mission level	Year closed	Ref.
Belize	Belmopan	Embassy (Note: Resident in San Salvador, El Salvador)	2020	
Cuba	Havana	Embassy	2026	
Nicaragua	Rivas	Consulate	2006	
Trinidad and Tobago	Port of Spain	Embassy	2019	
Venezuela	Caracas	Embassy	2020	
United States	Chicago	Consulate	2022	
Canada	Toronto	Consulate	2022	

=== Asia ===
Host country	Host city	Mission level	Year closed	Ref.
Azerbaijan	Baku	Embassy	2019	
Taiwan	Taipei	Embassy	2007	

=== Europe ===
Host country	Host city	Mission level	Year closed	Ref.
Czech Republic	Prague	Embassy	2009	
Norway	Oslo	Embassy	2015	
Poland	Warsaw	Embassy (Note: Resident in Bern, Switzerland)	2008	
Romania	Bucharest	Embassy	1999	

=== Oceania ===
Host country	Host city	Mission level	Year closed	Ref.
Australia	Sydney	Consulate General	2020	

=== Multilateral organizations ===
Organization	Host city	Host country	Type of mission	Year closed	Ref.
UNESCO	Paris	France	Permanent Mission	2020	

== See also ==
- Foreign relations of Costa Rica
- List of diplomatic missions in Costa Rica
- Visa policy of Costa Rica
