= List of Costa Rican politicians =

This is a list of notable Costa Rican politicians.

== A ==
- Vicente Aguilar Cubero
- Florentino Alfaro Zamora
- Alejandro Alvarado García
- Carlos Alvarado Quesada
- Antonio Álvarez Desanti
- Apolinar de Jesús Soto Quesada
- Johnny Araya Monge
- Rolando Araya Monge
- Óscar Arias Sánchez
- Isaac Felipe Azofeifa
- Bernardo Rodríguez y Alfaro

== B ==
- Manuel Antonio Bonilla Nava
- Miguel de Bonilla y Laya-Bolívar
- Roberto Brenes Mesén

== C ==
- Francisco Calderón Guardia
- Rafael Calderón Muñoz
- Joaquín Bernardo Calvo Rosales
- Rodrigo Alberto Carazo Zeledón
- Kevin Casas Zamora
- Florencio del Castillo
- Ricardo Castro Beeche
- Ramón Castro y Ramírez
- Alberto Cañas Escalante
- José Joaquín Chaverri Sievert
- Laura Chinchilla Miranda
- Cipriano Pérez y Arias
- José Andrés Coronado Alvarado
- Fernando Coto Albán

== D ==
- Domingo González Pérez
- Carlos Durán Cartín

== E ==
- Aquileo J. Echeverría
- Alberto Salom Echeverría
- Epsy Campbell Barr
- Narciso Esquivel y Salazar

== F ==
- Máximo Fernández Alvarado
- Mauro Fernández Acuña
- José María Figueres
- Eusebio Figueroa Oreamuno

== G ==
- Germán Serrano Pinto
- Gerardo Gómez Ramírez
- Victoria Guardia Alvarado
- Ezequiel Gutiérrez Iglesias
- Gerardo Guzmán Quirós

== I ==
- Francisco María Iglesias Llorente
- Joaquín de Iglesias Vidamartel

== J ==
- Ramón Jiménez y Robredo
- Agapito Jiménez Zamora
- Joaquín García Monge
- Jorge Hine Saborío
- José Francisco de Peralta y López del Corral
- José Miguel Corrales Bolaños
- Juan Fernando Echeverría
- Juan José de Bonilla y Herdocia
- Juan de Obregón y Espinosa

== L ==
- Silvia Lara Povedano
- Pedro María León-Páez y Brown
- Lorena Clare Facio
- Luis Diego Sáenz Carazo

== M ==
- Rodrigo Madrigal Nieto
- Juan de los Santos Madriz y Cervantes
- Manuel José Carazo Bonilla
- Manuel María de Peralta y López del Corral
- Manuel de Jesús Jiménez Oreamuno
- Marco Vinicio Vargas Pereira
- María Elena Carballo
- Juan Rafael Mata Lafuente
- Carlos Meléndez Chaverri
- José Merino del Río
- Miguel Carranza Fernández
- Felipe Francisco Molina y Bedoya
- Francisco Montealegre Fernández
- Félix Arcadio Montero Monge
- Lorenzo Montúfar y Rivera
- José Joaquín Mora Porras
- Manuel Mora Valverde
- Ricardo Moreno Cañas
- Rafael Moya Murillo
- Pedro Muñoz Fonseca

== N ==
- Bernd H. Niehaus Quesada

== O ==
- Karen Olsen Beck
- Otto Guevara Guth

== P ==
- Abel Pacheco
- Margarita Penón Góngora
- Manuel María de Peralta y Alfaro
- René Picado Michalski
- José Concepción Pinto y Castro
- Eusebio Prieto y Ruiz

== R ==
- Rafael Ramírez Hidalgo
- Percy Rodríguez
- Miguel Ángel Rodríguez
- Jorge Rossi Chavarría

== S ==
- José Carlos Sáenz Esquivel
- Fernando Sánchez Campos
- Benito Serrano Jiménez
- Ottón Solís Fallas
- Luis Guillermo Solís
- Bruno Stagno Ugarte

== T ==
- Tobías Zúñiga Castro
- Ricardo Toledo Carranza
- Nazario Toledo
- Tomás Enrique Soley Soler
- Roberto Tovar Faja
- Arnoldo André Tinoco
- Tranquilino de Bonilla y Herdocia
- Gerardo Trejos Salas

== U ==
- Juan José Ulloa Solares

== V ==
- Marco Vargas Diaz
- Santos Velázquez y Tinoco
- Andrés Venegas
- José María Villalta Florez-Estrada
- Fernando Volio Jiménez
- Jorge Volio Jiménez
- Julián Volio Llorente
- Víctor Morales Mora

== Z ==
- José María Zeledón Brenes
