= Jorge Guardia Carazo =

Costa Rican jurist and politician (1881–1956)

44th President of the Supreme Court of Costa Rica
- In office 8 November 1949 – 11 May 1955
- Preceded by: Gerardo Guzmán Quirós
- Succeeded by: Fernando Baudrit Solera

Magistrate of the Supreme Court of Costa Rica
- In office 8 May 1948 – 11 May 1955
- Preceded by: Octavio Rodríguez Méndez
- Succeeded by: Fernando Baudrit Solera
- In office 5 May 1920 – 5 May 1938
- Preceded by: Luis Dávila Solera
- Succeeded by: Gerardo Guzmán Quirós

Under Secretary of Finance and Commerce
- In office 8 May 1914 – 27 January 1917
- President: Alfredo González Flores

Personal details
- Born: Jorge Guardia Carazo; 15 October 1881 San José, Costa Rica
- Died: 3 January 1956 (aged 74) San José, Costa Rica
- Party: Republican (1914–1917)
- Relatives: Tomás Guardia Gutiérrez (uncle)
- Occupation: Lawyer; judge; professor

Jorge Tomás Leopoldo Guardia Carazo (15 October 1881 – 3 January 1956) was a Costa Rican jurist and politician who served as the 44th President of the Supreme Court of Costa Rica from 1949 to 1955. He served as a magistrate from 1920 to 1938 and from 1948 to 1955, and was the first president of the Supreme Court appointed under the Second Republic.

== Biography ==
Guardia Carazo was born in San José on 15 October 1881. He was the son of Miguel Guardia Gutiérrez and Amelia Carazo Peralta. His father, Miguel Guardia Gutiérrez, was the brother of Tomás Guardia Gutiérrez, who served as president of Costa Rica from 1870 to 1876 and from 1877 to 1882. Through his mother, Guardia was a descendant of José María de Peralta y La Vega, who served as president of the Superior Governing Junta in 1822 and president of the Provincial Congress in 1823.

In December 1920, Guardia married María de los Ángeles Dora Gertrudis Hine Pinto, with whom he had seven children. Hine was the daughter of Francisco Pinto Castro and a granddaughter of Antonio Pinto Soares, who served as head of state of Costa Rica in 1842.

Guardia studied law at the Law School and subsequently entered the legal profession. He served as Undersecretary of Finance and Commerce during the administration of President Alfredo González Flores from 1914 to 1917, and as interim head of the Secretariat from May to September 1915. After his government service, Guardia practiced law privately and served as legal counsel to the International Bank of Costa Rica. He also taught at the Law School.

In 1920, Guardia was elected by the Constitutional Congress as a magistrate of the Chamber of Cassation of the Supreme Court of Justice, the highest judicial body in Costa Rica. Congress re-elected him to the seat in 1922, 1926, 1930 and 1934, and remained on the court until 1938. He was again appointed a magistrate in 1948 and served until 1949.

Following the establishment of the Second Republic, Guardia was elected president of the Supreme Court of Justice in 1949. He held the position until 1955. His combined service as a magistrate of the Supreme Court spanned more than two decades.

== Death ==
Guardia Carazo died in San José on 3 January 1956.
