= Vicente Sáenz Llorente =

Costa Rican jurist and academic (1832–1895)

Acting President of the Supreme Court of Costa Rica
- In office 29 August 1889 – 8 May 1890
- Preceded by: José Joaquín Rodríguez Zeledón
- Succeeded by: Ricardo Jiménez Oreamuno
- In office 26 February 1887 – 1 January 1888
- Preceded by: José Antonio Pinto Castro
- Succeeded by: José Joaquín Rodríguez Zeledón

23rd President of the Supreme Court of Costa Rica
- In office 25 November 1873 – 3 August 1876
- Preceded by: José María Castro Madriz
- Succeeded by: Eusebio Figueroa Oreamuno

Magistrate of the Supreme Court of Costa Rica
- In office 10 October 1878 – 12 February 1895
- In office 8 May 1868 – 31 July 1876

Prosecutor of the Supreme Court of Justice
- In office 11 October 1877 – 10 October 1878
- Preceded by: Miguel Macaya de la Esquina
- Succeeded by: Gerardo Castro Méndez

Personal details
- Born: Vicente Sáenz Llorente; 5 February 1832 Cartago, Costa Rica, Federal Republic of Central America
- Died: 12 February 1895 (aged 63) San José, Costa Rica
- Education: Universidad de San Carlos de Guatemala (LLB)

Vicente Sáenz Llorente (5 February 1832 – 12 February 1895) was a Costa Rican jurist and academic who served as the 23rd President of the Supreme Court from 1873 to 1876. He held several judicial positions and later served as rector of the University of Santo Tomás from 1883 to 1885.

== Biography ==
Sáenz was born in Cartago, Costa Rica, on 5 February 1832. He was the son of Francisco Javier Sáenz y Ulloa (1794–1842), a signatory of Costa Rica's Act of Independence, and María Margarita Llorente y Lafuente (1800–1883), sister of Bishop Anselmo Llorente y Lafuente. He married Marcelina Esquivel y Fernández (1843–1907) in 1858. Among their children were José Carlos Sáenz Esquivel, who served as Vice Minister of Foreign Affairs from 1891 to 1892, and Miguel Sáenz Esquivel. He was also the brother of physician and politician Andrés Sáenz Llorente.

He received his early education in Cartago and subsequently studied law at the University of San Carlos de Guatemala, where he obtained a law degree.

Sáenz began his professional career in the legal field, serving as a public defender, a civil and commercial court judge in San José and Liberia, a prosecutor, and a magistrate of the Supreme Court of Justice on several occasions.

On 25 November 1873, while serving as president of the Second Chamber of the Supreme Court, he was appointed by President Tomás Guardia Gutiérrez to preside over the Supreme Court and its First Chamber. In August 1876, following the overthrow of his cousin, President Aniceto Esquivel Sáenz, the government of Vicente Herrera Zeledón appointed him again as president of the court, but he declined the position and returned to private legal practice.

Sáenz subsequently resumed his judicial career, serving as president of the First Chamber from 1881 to 1882. He also served as acting president of the Supreme Court from February 1887 to 1 January 1888 and again from August 1889 to 8 May 1890.

Alongside his judicial career, Sáenz taught law and served as rector of the University of Santo Tomás from 1883 to 1885. During his tenure, the university library was opened to the public at his initiative, becoming the first public library in Costa Rica.

He also served as chief notary of the Ecclesiastical Curia of Costa Rica and as a lawyer for the National Bank. In 1869, he was elected as a deputy of the Constituent Assembly. He was also a founding member of the first board of directors of the Costa Rican Bar Association in 1881 and subsequently served as its president.

Sáenz Llorente died in San José, Costa Rica, on 12 February 1895, aged 63.
