= Manuel Vicente Jiménez Oreamuno =

Costa Rican lawyer and politician (1844–1908)

Manuel Jiménez Oreamuno

30th & 32nd President of the Supreme Court of Costa Rica
- In office 18 May 1902 – 8 May 1904
- Preceded by: José Joaquín Rodríguez Zeledón
- Succeeded by: Alejandro Alvarado García
- In office 8 May 1894 – 8 May 1898
- Preceded by: Ramón Carranza Ramírez
- Succeeded by: José Joaquín Rodríguez Zeledón

Magistrate of the Supreme Court of Costa Rica
- In office 8 May 1894 – October 1907
- In office 3 August 1882 – 8 June 1892
- In office 5 December 1876 – 24 September 1877

Secretary of Foreign Affairs (Note: Simultaneously in charge of the portfolios of Public Instruction, Justice, Grace, Worship and Charity.)
- In office 8 June 1892 – 8 May 1894
- President: José Joaquín Rodríguez Zeledón
- Preceded by: Pedro Pérez Zeledón
- Succeeded by: Ricardo Pacheco Marchena

Deputy of the National Constituent Assembly
- In office 15 October 1871 – 28 December 1871
- Preceded by: Office established
- Succeeded by: Office abolished

Personal details
- Born: Manuel Vicente Jiménez Oreamuno; 25 July 1844 Cartago, Costa Rica
- Died: 13 January 1908 (aged 63) San José, Costa Rica
- Education: University of Santo Tomás (LLB)

Manuel Vicente Jiménez Oreamuno (25 July 1844 – 13 January 1908) was a Costa Rican jurist and politician who served as the 30th and 32nd President of the Supreme Court of Justice from 1894 to 1898 and from 1902 to 1904.

== Biography ==
Jiménez Oreamuno was born in Cartago, Costa Rica, on 25 July 1844. He was the son of José Manuel Jiménez Zamora and Dolores Oreamuno y Carazo. He married Juana Ortiz Garita and studied law at the University of Santo Tomás, where he obtained a law degree.

Jiménez participated in the Constituent Assemblies of 1869 and 1871. He subsequently served as a member of the Chamber of Representatives from 1869 to 1870. His judicial career included appointments as a magistrate of the Supreme Court of Justice from 1876 to 1877 and again from 1882 to 1890. In 1882, he was elected as an alternate deputy for Cartago, but did not serve in order to assume judicial office.

From 1892 to 1894, he served as Secretary of Foreign Affairs, with responsibility for additional government portfolios. In 1894, he was elected president of the Supreme Court of Justice, serving until 1898. He subsequently served as a magistrate of the Chamber of Cassation from 1898 to 1902.

In 1902, Jiménez returned to the presidency of the Supreme Court of Justice, a position he held until 1904. He also served as a magistrate of the Chamber of Cassation from 1902 until his resignation in 1907.

== See also ==
- List of presidents of the Supreme Court of Costa Rica
