= José Antonio Pinto Castro =

Costa Rican lawyer and politician (1817–1887)

27th President of the Supreme Court of Costa Rica
- In office 8 May 1886 – 26 February 1887
- Preceded by: Rafael Orozco González
- Succeeded by: Vicente Sáenz Llorente

Acting President of Costa Rica
- In office 25 June 1872 – 26 January 1873
- Preceded by: Tomás Guardia Gutiérrez
- Succeeded by: Tomás Guardia Gutiérrez

First Designate to the Presidency
- In office 8 May 1872 – 8 May 1873
- President: Tomás Guardia Gutiérrez; Himself (acting)
- Preceded by: Rafael Barroeta Baca
- Succeeded by: Salvador González Ramírez

Magistrate of the Supreme Court of Costa Rica
- In office 10 August 1882 – 26 February 1887
- In office 8 May 1876 – 28 September 1876
- In office 13 December 1868 – 28 October 1870
- In office 22 January 1857 – September 1857

Member of the Chamber of Representatives
- In office 1 May 1860 – 1 November 1868
- Constituency: San José Province

Additional positions
- 1859: Member of the Constituent Assembly

Personal details
- Born: José Antonio Pinto Castro; 26 July 1817 San José, Captaincy General of Guatemala, Spanish Empire
- Died: 26 February 1887 (aged 69) San José, Costa Rica
- Party: Independent
- Parent(s): António Pinto Soares; María Castro Ramírez
- Relatives: José Concepción Pinto Castro (brother); José María Castro Madriz (second cousin)
- Education: Universidad de San Carlos de Guatemala (LLB)

José Antonio Pinto Castro (26 July 1817 – 26 February 1887) was a Costa Rican lawyer and politician who served as the 27th President of the Supreme Court from 1886 until his death in 1887. He previously served as First Designate to the Presidency, acting as president of Costa Rica from June 1872 to January 1873 during the absence of Tomás Guardia Gutiérrez. He also served as a deputy representing San José in Congress from 1860 to 1868.

== Biography ==
Pinto was born in San José on 26 July 1817, the son of General António Pinto Soares and María del Rosario Castro Ramírez. He was married to Juana Samayoa y Leiva and obtained a law degree from the Universidad de San Carlos de Guatemala. His brother, José Concepción Pinto Castro, was also a lawyer and politician. Pinto was a second cousin of José María Castro Madriz, with whom he would also later share membership at the Caridad Lodge of the Costa Rican Freemasonry. He adopted the symbolic masonic name "Tulio Severo".

Early in his career, Pinto served as Auditor de Guerra (War Auditor) and governor of San José Province. He was first appointed a magistrate of the Supreme Court of Justice in January 1857 at age 40, but resigned in September of that year. He supported the coup d'état against President Juan Rafael Mora Porras in August 1859, and was later elected as a deputy of the Constituent Assembly for San José. Pinto represented the province in the legislature from 1860 until the breakdown of the constitutional order in November 1868.

Pinto returned to the Supreme Court in December 1868 and was appointed president of its Second Chamber in May 1969. He served in the court until his appointment to the government in 1870.

In October 1870, provisional president Tomás Guardia Gutiérrez appointed Pinto Secretary of the Interior and Police. Following the 1872 general election, the Constitutional Congress elected him as the innagural First Designate to the Presidency under the Constitution of 1871, for a one-year term. During this period, Pinto served as acting president of Costa Rica for seven months between 25 June 1872 to 26 January 1873, while Guardia was on his first trip to Europe.

Following the 1876 election, Congress appointed Pinto to the Supreme Court. He remained in office after the coup of July 1876, but his position was abolished in September of that year. He was subsequently appointed prosecutor of the court, although he declined to serve in that position. He was also appointed as a magistrate once more in October in 1880, but declined the position.

After the restoration of constitutional government and the 1882 general election, Congress appointed Pinto a magistrate of the Supreme Court and president of its Second Chamber for a four-year term. Following the 1886 election, Congress appointed him president of the Supreme Court for the 1886–1890 term.

He died in San José on 26 February 1887, while holding the office, at the age of 69.
