= Nicolás Oreamuno Ortiz =

Costa Rican jurist and politician (1866–1945)

37th President of the Supreme Court of Costa Rica
- In office 8 May 1920 – 8 May 1934
- Preceded by: Ascensión Esquivel Ibarra
- Succeeded by: Octavio Béeche Argüello

Magistrate of the Supreme Court of Costa Rica
- In office 8 May 1920 – 8 May 1934
- Preceded by: Ascensión Esquivel Ibarra
- Succeeded by: Octavio Béeche Argüello
- In office 8 May 1904 – 8 May 1908
- Preceded by: Alejandro Alvarado García
- Succeeded by: Alberto Brenes Córdoba

Secretary of War, Navy and Public Instruction
- In office 8 May 1910 – 1913
- President: Ricardo Jiménez Oreamuno
- Preceded by: Demetrio Yglesias Castro

Deputy of the Constitutional Congress
- In office 1 May 1902 – 8 May 1904
- Constituency: Cartago Province
- In office 1 May 1894 – 30 April 1896
- Constituency: Cartago Province

Personal details
- Born: José Nicolás de Jesús Oreamuno Ortiz; 22 April 1866 Cartago, Costa Rica
- Died: 22 October 1945 (aged 79) San José, Costa Rica
- Party: Republican
- Other political affiliations: PUN (1902)
- Occupation: Lawyer; judge; politician

José Nicolás de Jesús Oreamuno Ortiz (22 April 1866 – 22 October 1945) was a Costa Rican jurist and politician who served as the 37th President of the Supreme Court of Costa Rica from 1920 to 1934. He served as a magistrate from 1904 to 1908 and from 1920 to 1934.

== Biography ==
José Nicolás de Jesús Oreamuno Ortiz was born in Cartago, Costa Rica, on 22 April 1866. He was the son of Rafael Oreamuno Carazo and Mercedes Ortiz Ortiz. Through his paternal family, he was a grandson of Joaquín de Oreamuno y Muñoz de la Trinidad, who served as Commander General of the Army from March to April 1823. He married Adelia Flores Camacho.

During his youth, Oreamuno worked as a primary school teacher and school inspector in Cartago. He subsequently studied law at the Law School of Costa Rica, where he graduated with a law degree in 1898.

Oreamuno served as a member of the Constitutional Congress representing Cartago from 1894 to 1896 and again from 1902 to 1904. In 1904, he was appointed a magistrate of the Chamber of Cassation of the Supreme Court of Justice, where he served until 1908. From 1910 to 1913, he served as Secretary of War, Navy, and Public Instruction under President Ricardo Jiménez Oreamuno.

In 1913, Oreamuno was elected for a five-year term as a magistrate of the Central American Court of Justice, an international judicial institution established under the Central American Court of Justice Convention. He served as its president from 1913 to 1914.

In 1918, due to his opposition to the Tinoco regime in Costa Rica, Oreamuno was forced to leave the country. He subsequently settled in Honduras, where he held several public offices. Following the fall of the Tinoco regime, he returned to Costa Rica. In May 1920, the Constitutional Congress elected him president of the Supreme Court of Justice and the Chamber of Cassation. He was re-elected in 1922, 1926, and 1930, remaining in office until 1934.

== Death ==
Oreamuno Ortiz died in San José on 22 October 1945, aged 79.
