= Tinoco =

Tinoco is a surname. Notable people with the surname include:

- Agustín Cruz Tinoco, Mexican wood carver
- Alfredo Tinoco (born 1934), Mexican middle-distance runner
- Alfredo Alves Tinoco (1904–1975), Brazilian football player
- Arnoldo André Tinoco, Costa Rican politician
- Francisco Márquez Tinoco (born 1960), Mexican politician
- Gerson Tinoco (born 1988), Guatemalan football player
- Jesús Tinoco (born 1995), Venezuelan baseball player
- José Tinoco (born 1974), Guatemalan sprinter
- Luís Tinoco
  - Luís Tinoco (composer), Portuguese composer
  - Luís Tinoco (footballer) (born 1986), Portuguese footballer
- Marcos Tinoco, Brazilian football manager
- María Fernández de Tinoco (1877–1961), Costa Rican writer
- Pedro Tinoco (c. 1928–1993), Venezuelan businessman and politician
- Pedro Nunes Tinoco (d. 1641), Portuguese architect
- Rodolfo Aguirre Tinoco (born 1927), Mexican artist
- Santos Velázquez y Tinoco (d. 1846), Costa Rican politician
- Tania Tinoco (born 1963), Ecuadorian journalist, author, producer
