= Patricia Vargas González =

Costa Rican lawyer and judge (born 1974)

55th President of the Supreme Court of Costa Rica
- Incumbent
- Assumed office 26 October 2026
- Preceded by: Orlando Aguirre Gómez

Magistrate of the Supreme Court of Costa Rica
- Incumbent
- Assumed office 21 September 2023
- Preceded by: Álvaro Burgos Mata

Personal details
- Born: Patricia Vargas González; 8 July 1974 (age 52) San José, Costa Rica
- Education: University of Costa Rica (LLB, LL.M.); University of Salamanca (PhD)
- Occupation: Lawyer; judge; professor

Patricia Vargas González (born 8 July 1974) is a Costa Rican jurist and academic who has served as the 55th President of the Supreme Court of Justice since 2026, becoming the second woman to hold the office. Vargas has served as a magistrate of the court's Criminal Appeals Chamber since 2023, following a career in the judiciary.

Alongside her judicial work, Vargas has pursued an academic career, teaching criminal law and legal research courses at the University of Costa Rica and contributing to research and scholarship in criminal law.

== Biography ==
Patricia Vargas González was born in San José, Costa Rica, on 8 July 1974. She completed her primary education at the Estados Unidos de América School and her secondary education at the Liceo San Joaquín de Flores, where she graduated with honors in 1991, both located in Flores.

Vargas studied law at the University of Costa Rica, where she earned a bachelor's degree in law in 1996 and qualified as a notary public in 1997. She subsequently completed a master's degree in criminal sciences at the same university in 2006. In 2012, she received a doctorate in criminal law from the University of Salamanca in Spain, where her doctoral thesis on the confiscation of criminal assets received the distinction cum laude. Her doctoral qualification was recognized by the University of Costa Rica in 2013.

Vargas has worked in several roles within Costa Rica's judicial system. Her previous positions include public defender in criminal proceedings and sentence execution, supervisor and legal assistant in the Public Defence Service, judge at a criminal trial court in the Third Judicial Circuit of San José, and judge at the Criminal Appeals Court of the Second Judicial Circuit of San José. She also worked as a legal clerk at the Supreme Court's Criminal Appeals Chamber.

Alongside her judicial career, Vargas has taught law at the University of Costa Rica and the National University of Costa Rica. Her teaching has included undergraduate and postgraduate courses on criminal law, legal research, criminal sciences and judicial administration. She also worked as a researcher at the University of Costa Rica's Institute of Legal Research from 2021 to 2022. As of 2026, Vargas taught the Special Criminal Law (III and IV) courses at its Faculty of Law.

On 18 September 2023, the Legislative Assembly elected Vargas as a full magistrate of the Supreme Court's Criminal Appeals Chamber, with 38 votes. She was sworn in on 21 September 2023 for a constitutional term of eight years, ending in September 2031.

On 26 October 2026, Vargas was elected president of the Supreme Court of Costa Rica by the full court (Corte Plena). She obtained 12 votes in the fifth round of voting, succeeding Orlando Aguirre Gómez. The other candidates were magistrates Patricia Solano Castro, Gerardo Rubén Alfaro Vargas and Damaris Vargas Vásquez.
