= 1906 Costa Rican general election =

- 20–22 August 1905 (popular vote); 1 April 1906 (electoral college)
- Presidential election

487 members of the Electoral College (Note: Out of the 855 electors chosen in the first round, only 487 took part in the second round.) 244 votes needed to win
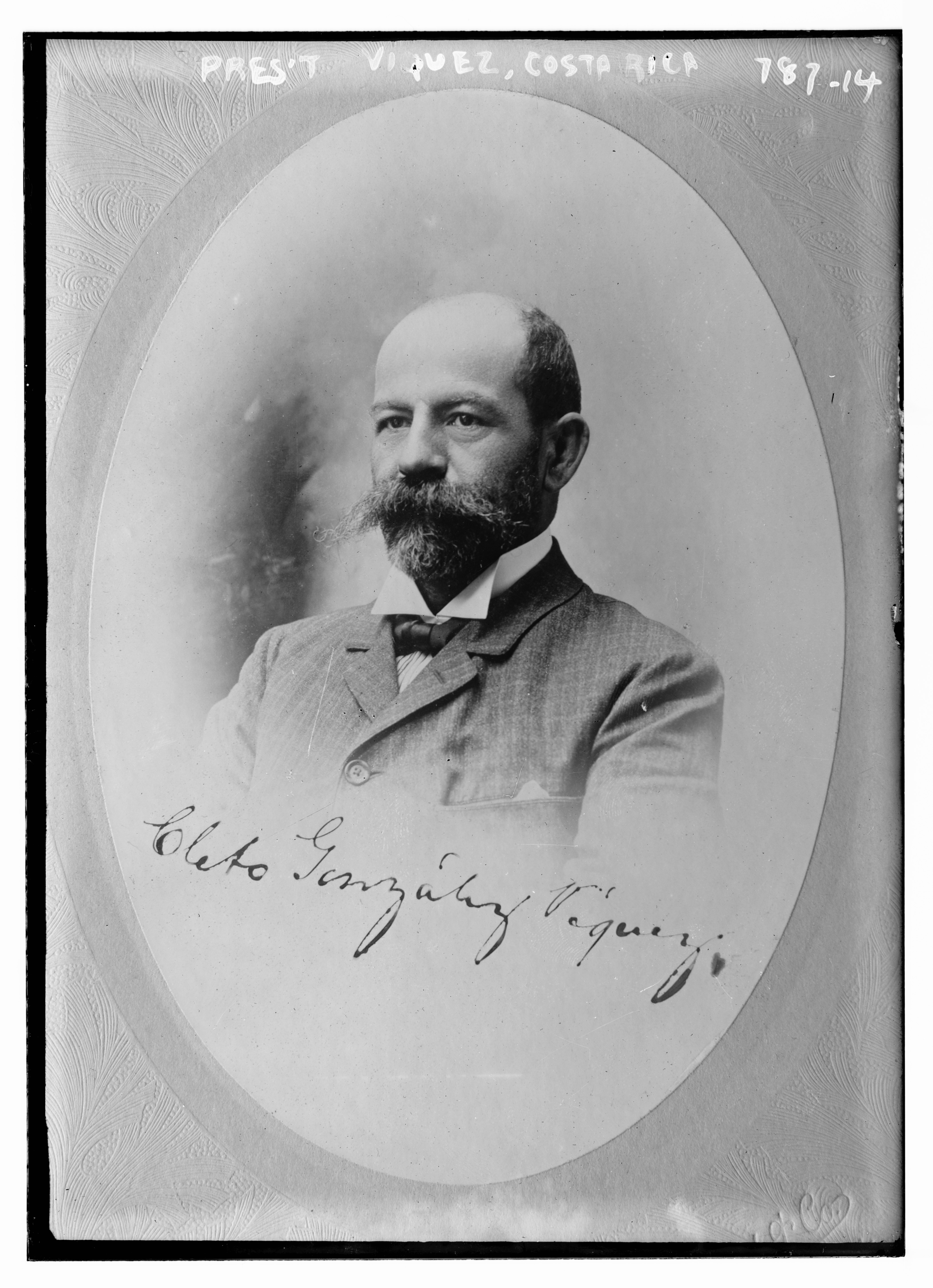

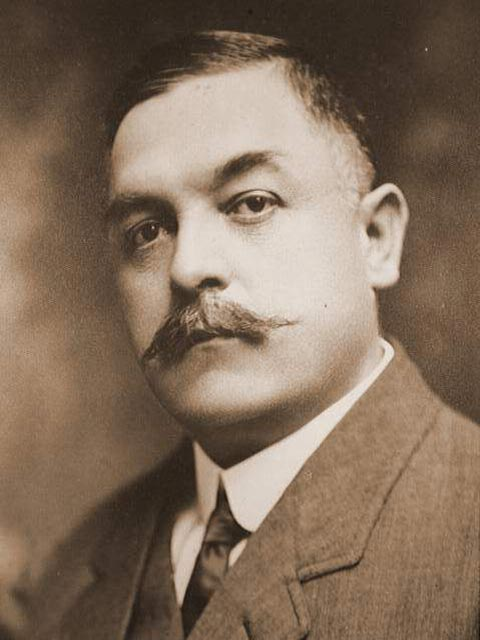
Nominee	Cleto González Víquez	Máximo Fernández Alvarado
Party	National	Republican
Electoral vote	427	24
Popular vote	17,850	Unknown
Percentage	47.73%	Unknown
- Official results by province (Note: First round official results are available by province, except for Alajuela, where the data has not been preserved.)
President before election
Ascensión Esquivel Ibarra
National
Elected President
Cleto González Víquez
National
- Legislative election
- 15 of the 32 seats in the Constitutional Congress

General elections were held in Costa Rica on 20–22 August 1905 to elect the president and half of the Constitutional Congress. Incumbent president Ascensión Esquivel was ineligible for a second term, endorsing National Party candidate Cleto González Víquez.

The first round of voting was relatively competitive for the period, with four prominent figures contesting the election against the government-backed candidate: former Secretary of the Interior Máximo Fernández Alvarado, former Secretary of the Interior and Police Tobías Zúñiga Castro, former president Bernardo Soto Alfaro, and former Secretary of Justice and Foreign Affairs Ezequiel Gutiérrez Iglesias. Political differences among the candidates were largely personal rather than ideological, as all but Gutiérrez broadly adhered to liberal political positions.

== Background ==
The election took place during the presidency of Ascensión Esquivel Ibarra, who had been elected in 1902 following the Transacción agreement between the Civil Party and a large faction of the Republican Party. While the official Republican leadership nominated party founder Máximo Fernández, the candidate jointly supported by the government and a significant segment of the opposition was Esquivel, who defeated Fernández by a wide margin in both the popular vote and the electoral college.

Beginning in 1902, Republican deputies introduced several legislative initiatives aimed at implementing constitutional reforms. As the party held a minority position in the Constitutional Congress, most of these proposals were rejected. The principal exception was an amendment to Article 97 of the 1871 Constitution, which reinstated the prohibition on immediate presidential reelection, reversing a change previously approved during the presidency of Rafael Yglesias Castro.

In the lead-up to the 1906 election, President Esquivel publicly endorsed Cleto González Víquez, a former Republican and Second Designate to the Presidency, who was widely regarded as the government’s preferred candidate. González Víquez had previously served as Secretary of Foreign Affairs in 1889, a deputy to Congress in 1892, Secretary of Finance and Commerce from 1902 to 1903, and Municipal President of San José beginning in 1904.

== Electoral system ==
Under the legislation, control of the electoral process was concentrated in the Executive Branch, particularly in the president and the Secretary of the Interior and Police. Provincial electoral boards were appointed by the executive and presided over by the respective provincial governors. These boards oversaw the vote count and appointed cantonal boards, which were chaired by the political chiefs and, in turn, designated district boards responsible for compiling voter registers.

The electoral process followed a two-stage system of indirect voting. In the first stage, eligible male citizens voted publicly to select second-degree electors. In the second stage, these electors chose the president by secret ballot. Eligibility to serve as an elector generally required property ownership and literacy, which meant that electors were drawn primarily from wealthier sectors and the middle class. Electors could be subject to political pressure to change their support from the candidate originally favored by voters.

The same body of electors also selected the deputies to the Constitutional Congress for four-year terms. Electoral assemblies were held in the capital city of each province and were presided over by the provincial governor, who was appointed by the president.

== Campaign ==
The election was marked by strong anti-Cletista sentiment—opposition to Cleto González Víquez—which united various political factions. One explanation circulated at the time was that, since the Civil Party did not contest the election, there existed a “secret pact” in which former president Rafael Yglesias agreed to transfer power to Ascensión Esquivel on the understanding that Esquivel would, in turn, hand it to González, after which Yglesias would return to office in 1910. González was formally proclaimed the National Party’s candidate in March 1905 at a political demonstration in San José. The party retained the white flag of the National Union Party, bearing the slogan "Progress, Labor, Liberty."

Although there were discussions about forming a united opposition front against González, no formal coalition emerged. Conservative candidate Ezequiel Gutiérrez Iglesias ran under the Democratic Union, a party created after the banning of the Catholic Union.

In the first round, González received only a plurality of both the popular vote and the electors, leaving open the possibility that a united opposition could defeat him in the second round. The National Union Party obtained no less than 17,850 votes (47.73%), while the opposition had a combined 19,313 votes (51.65%). Máximo Fernández Alvarado and Bernardo Soto Alfaro subsequently endorsed Tobías Zúñiga Castro, who was seen as the opposition figure with the best chance of prevailing.

On 15 February 1906, the three main opposition factions—supporters of Fernández, Soto, and Zúñiga—formed an alliance called the Republican Union, with their electors formally pledging in writing to support Zúñiga. Under this agreement, Zúñiga reportedly secured a majority in the second round, defeating González by 485 votes to 351, with the support of the 19 electors aligned with Gutiérrez.

However, on 7 March, while Congress was in recess, its Standing Committee approved a presidential request to suspend civil liberties for up to 60 days. Citing concerns for public order and “the peace and tranquility of the country,” President Esquivel declared martial law and ordered a crackdown on the opposition. Fernández, Soto, and Zúñiga were arrested and accused of plotting to assassinate Esquivel, González, and Interior Secretary José Astúa Aguilar. The three were subsequently exiled to New York City.

As a result, 57% of opposition electors abstained from participating in the second round, while others were reportedly pressured into voting for González, who was ultimately declared president. Following his inauguration, the exiled leaders were permitted to return to Costa Rica by presidential decree. Zúñiga withdrew from political life, while Fernández remained active, remaining at the leadership of the Republican Party.

Among the deputies elected to Congress were Ricardo Jiménez Oreamuno, Carlos María Jiménez Ortiz, Pánfilo Valverde Carranza, Andrés Venegas García, Luis Anderson Morúa, Félix Mata Valle.

== Results ==
Candidate	Party	Electoral College first round		Electoral College second round	
Candidate	Party	Votes	%	Votes	%
Cleto González Víquez	National Party	351	41.05	427	91.43
Máximo Fernández Alvarado	Republican Party	273	31.93	24	5.14
Tobías Zúñiga Castro	People's Party	130	15.20	3	0.64
Bernardo Soto Alfaro	Independent Republican Party	82	9.59	9	1.93
Ezequiel Gutiérrez Iglesias	Democratic Union Party	19	2.22	4	0.86
Total		855	100.00	467	100.00
Source: TSE, Salazar

=== Second round results by province ===
Province	González	Fernández	Zúñiga	Soto
San José Province	30	12	2	5
Alajuela	96	3	1	4
Cartago Province	101	-	-	-
Heredia	63	9	-	-
Guanacaste	78	-	-	-
Puntarenas	26	-	-	-
Limón	33	-	-	-
Total	427	24	3	9
Source: Salazar
