= List of political parties in Costa Rica =

This article lists political parties in Costa Rica. Costa Rica used to have a two-party system, which meant that there were two dominant political parties, the Social Christian Unity Party and the National Liberation Party, with extreme difficulty for anybody to achieve electoral success under the banner of any other party. After the 2002 elections and the strong showing of the brand-new Citizens' Action Party, it was considered very likely that the old two-party system was on the verge of giving way to a multi-party system. Several other parties have gained prominence since then, and the 2006 elections made it clear that Costa Rica is now a multi-party system.

Starting in the 2000s, disagreement about many of the neo-liberal policies promoted by the dominant PLN caused the traditional party system of alliances among a few parties to fracture. Although still a stable country, the shift toward many political parties and away from PUSC and PLN is a recent development. Various elected positions within the country, such as mayors and city council members, are held by many different national and local political parties.

== Party Lists ==
=== Parliamentary fractions of the Legislative Assembly, 2026-2030 ===
Beginning on May 1st, 2026.

Political Parties in Legislative Assembly of Costa Rica, 2026-2030
Party	Abbr.	Founded	Deputies	Ideology	Position
Sovereign People's Party; Partido Pueblo Soberano	PPSO	2022	31 / 57	Conservatism Right-wing populism	Right-wing
National Liberation Party; Partido Liberación Nacional	PLN	1951	17 / 57	Social democracy; Figuerism	Centre-left
Broad Front; Frente Amplio	FA	2004	7 / 57	Democratic socialism; Progressivism	Left-wing
Citizens' Action Party; Partido Acción Ciudadana	PAC	2000	1 / 57	Progressivism; Figuerism	Centre-left
Social Christian Unity Party; Partido Unidad Social Cristiana	PUSC	1983	1 / 57	Christian democracy; Liberal conservatism	Centre-right

=== Extra-parliamentary parties ===
Nationally Unrepresented Political Parties
Party Name (English)	Party Name (Spanish)	Ideology	Position	Historic Notes
Accessibility without Exclusion	Partido Accessibilidad sin Exclusión (PASE)	Single issue, rights for people with disabilities, Social conservatism	Right-wing	Founded in 2001.
Christian Democratic Alliance	Alianza Demócrata Cristiana (ADC)	Conservativism, Christian democracy, provincial (Cartago)	Right-wing	Founded in 2012.
Costa Rican Renewal Party	Partido Renovación Costarricense (PRC)	Christian politics, Social conservatism	Right-wing	Founded in 1995.
Democratic Force	Fuerza Democrática (PFD)	Socialism	Left-wing	Founded in 1994. Held three seats from 1998 to 2002. Defunct as of 2006. Refounded in 2021 but unable to nominate candidate.
Progressive Liberal Party	Partido Liberal Progresista (PLP)	Libertarianism, Classical liberalism	Centre-right	Founded in 2016.
Libertarian Movement	Partido Movimiento Libertario (PML)	Classical liberalism, Liberal conservatism, Libertarianism (originally)	Right-wing	Founded in 1994.
National Restoration Party	Partido Restauración Nacional (PREN)	Christian politics, social conservatism	Right-wing to far-right	Founded in 2005.
National Integration Party	Partido Integración Nacional (PIN)	Social conservatism, economic nationalism	Right-wing	Founded in 1998.
New Generation Party	Partido Nueva Generación (PNG)	Economic liberalism, social conservatism, anti-immigration	Centre-right to right-wing	Founded in 2012.
New Republic Party	Partido Nueva República (PNR)	Conservatism, Social conservatism, Christian right	Right-wing to far-right	Founded in 2019.
Social Christian Republican Party	Partido Republicano Social Cristiano (PRSC)	Conservatism, Christian democracy, classical liberalism	Centre-right	Founded in 2014.
Social Democratic Progress Party	Partido Progreso Social Democrático (PPSD)	Social democracy, Social conservatism, Economic liberalism	Centre to centre-right	Founded in 2018.

=== Local ===
Local parties
Party Name (English)	Party Name (Spanish)	Canton	Historic Notes
Party of the Sun	Partido del Sol	Santa Ana	Founded in 1997. Originally single issue to oppose trash dump construction. Controlled Santa Ana City Council for four consecutive terms.
21st Century Curridabat	Curridabat Siglo 21	Curridabat	Founded in 1997, controlled Curridabat Mayoralty and City Council for four consecutive terms
Escazu's Progressive Yoke	Yunta Progresista Escazuseña	Escazu	Founded in 1996, controlled Escazu Mayoralty and City Council for three consecutive terms.
Cartago Green Party	Partido Verde de Cartago	Cartago	Founded in 2004.

=== Defunct/Inactive Political Parties ===
Defunct Political Parties
Party Name (English)	Party Name (Spanish)	Ideology	Historic Notes
National Union Party	Partido Unión Nacional (PUN)	Conservatism, Center-right	Founded in 1901. Has existed in various forms and coalition parties until 2010. Won the presidency four times (1902, 1928, 1948, 1958, 1966). 1948 election was unrecognized. Defunct as of 2010.
National Rescue Party	Partido Rescate Nacional (PRN)	Center-left, Moderate socialist	Founded in 1996. Held one legislative seat in 2006. Defunct as of 2010.
Popular Vanguard Party	Partido Vanguardia Popular (PVP)	Marxist–Leninist, Far-left	Founded in 1931. Existed as The Workers' and Farmers' Party and Communist Party of Costa Rica.
National Unification Party	Partido Unificación Nacional	Center-right, liberal-conservative	Founded in 1966 as joint of National Republican and National Union. Defunct as of 1978.
National Republican Party	Partido Republicano Nacional	Centrist, personal	Founded in 1901. Often called "Calderonistas." Joined Unity Coalition in 1978, which later became PUSC. Defunct as of 1978.
Agrarian Labour Action Party	Partido Acción Laborista Agrícola (PALA)	Agrarian, Provincial Alajuela	Founded in 1990. Held one seat in 1998. Defunct as of 2007.

== See also ==
- Politics of Costa Rica
- Elections in Costa Rica
- List of Costa Rican politicians
