= Eusebio Prieto y Ruiz =

Costa Rican politician (1808–1850)

13th Regent of the Supreme Court of Costa Rica
- In office 7 August 1846 – 14 May 1847
- Preceded by: Luz Blanco y Zamora
- Succeeded by: Rafael Ramírez Hidalgo

Magistrate of the Supreme Court of Costa Rica
- In office 10 January 1845 – 14 May 1847

Personal details
- Born: José Eusebio Prieto y Ruiz; 7 November 1808 Cartago, Captaincy General of Guatemala, Spanish Empire
- Died: 21 March 1850 (aged 41) San José, Costa Rica

José Eusebio Prieto y Ruiz (7 November 1808 – 21 March 1850) was a Costa Rican politician who served as the 13th Regent of the Supreme Court of Justice from 1846 to 1847. He served as a magistrate from 1845 to 1847.

== Biography ==
Prieto was born in Cartago, Costa Rica, and was baptized on 7 November 1808. He was the son of José Ruperto Prieto y González del Suso and María Josefa Ruiz y Fernández. On 29 May 1832, he married María Ayala Corrales (1816–1866) in Cartago. She was the daughter of Juan de Dios de Ayala y Toledo, governor of Costa Rica, and Luisa Corrales. They had three children: Víctor Zacarías, who was born and died in 1833; María, who married Francisco Peña in 1850; and Agripina Prieto y Ayala, who married Guillermo Dent Cornejo.

In 1835, Prieto participated on the insurgent side in the League War, a civil conflict involving several Costa Rican towns. As a consequence of his involvement, he was briefly confined in San José. He was elected as a magistrate of the Supreme Court of Justice on 10 January 1845, for a two-year term.

On 4 August 1846, provisional Head of State José María Alfaro Zamora issued a decree granting the Senate, which had exercised power following the military coup of 7 June, the authority to appoint the president and prosecutor of the Supreme Court of Justice. On 7 August, the Senate appointed Prieto, then a magistrate, as president of the court. It also appointed a new prosecutor and three substitute magistrates to fill vacancies.

The composition of the court remained unsettled during the following months. In October 1846, new elections were called for two permanent magistrates because those elected in July had declined their appointments. Two of the individuals selected as substitute magistrates also refused to serve, requiring further appointments. The election of four new members of the court was not formally declared until February 1847. In March, one of the newly elected permanent magistrates and one substitute magistrate again declined their appointments. The de facto court ceased operating on 14 May 1847, when the magistrates appointed under the new Constitution, promulgated on 21 January of that year, assumed their positions.

Prieto died in San José, Costa Rica, on 21 March 1850, aged 41.
