= Gerardo Gómez =

Gerardo Gómez may refer to:

- Gerardo Gómez (footballer) (born 1989), Mexican footballer
- Gerardo Gómez (rower) (born 1976), Mexican rower
- Gerardo Gómez Ramírez (1901–1983), Costa Rican politician

== See also ==
- Gerard Gómez (disambiguation)
