= José Concepción Pinto Castro =

Costa Rican politician

Magistrate of the Supreme Court of Costa Rica
- In office 1 May 1864 – 6 May 1868
- Succeeded by: Manuel Argüello Mora

Prosecutor of the Supreme Court of Justice
- In office 1 May 1860 – 1 May 1864
- Preceded by: Vicente Herrera Zeledón
- Succeeded by: Eusebio Figueroa Oreamuno
- In office 17 August 1858 – 30 June 1859
- Preceded by: Emiliano Cuadra
- Succeeded by: Juan José Ulloa Solares

Personal details
- Born: José Concepción Pinto Castro; 8 January 1830 San José, Captaincy General of Guatemala, Spanish Empire
- Died: 15 April 1898 (aged 68) San José, Costa Rica
- Parent(s): António Pinto Soares; María Castro Ramírez
- Relatives: José Antonio Pinto Castro (brother); José María Castro Madriz (second cousin); José María Montealegre (brother-in-law)
- Education: Universidad de San Carlos de Guatemala (LLB)

José Concepción Pinto Castro (8 January 1830 – 15 April 1898) was a Costa Rican lawyer and politician.

His parents were General Antonio Pinto Soares and María del Rosario Castro y Ramírez. He married Aurelia Montealegre Fernández, daughter of Mariano Montealegre Bustamante, in 1859. His brother José Antonio Pinto Castro was President of the Supreme Court from 1886 to 1887.

He graduated in law from Universidad de San Carlos de Guatemala and served as secretary to President Rafael Carrera of Guatemala.

He was the Prosecutor for the Supreme Court of Justice of Costa Rica from 1858 to 1859 and again from 1860 to 1864, Governor of San José Province in 1859 and 1870, alternate deputy for San José in the Constituents Assembly from 1869, Chief of the National Seal, and magistrate of the Court from 1864 to 1868, when he declined a second term.

He actively participated in charitable activities. He was one of the founding members of the Brotherhood of Charity of San José and presided over the Board of Charity of San José.
