= Zarela =

Zarela is a feminine given name. Notable people with the name include:

- Zarela Martínez (fl. 1979), Mexican-American restaurateur and cookbook author
- Zarela Villanueva Monge (born 1952), Costa Rican magistrate
