= Rafael Orozco González =

Costa Rican lawyer and politician (1842–1897)

26th President of the Supreme Court of Costa Rica
- In office 16 October 1880 – 8 May 1886
- Preceded by: Miguel Macaya de la Esquina
- Succeeded by: José Antonio Pinto Castro

Magistrate of the Supreme Court of Costa Rica
- In office 8 May 1894 – 15 January 1897
- Succeeded by: José Astúa Aguilar
- In office 11 October 1877 – 8 May 1886

Under Secretary of Finance and Commerce
- In office April 1873 – December 1873
- President: Tomás Guardia Gutiérrez

Personal details
- Born: José Rafael Orozco González; 13 December 1842 Alajuela, Costa Rica
- Died: 15 January 1897 (aged 54) San José, Costa Rica
- Relatives: José María Castro Madriz (father-in-law)

José Rafael Orozco González (13 December 1842 – 15 January 1897) was a Costa Rican lawyer, academic and politician who served as the 26th President of the Supreme Court of Justice from 1880 to 1886. He served as a magistrate from 1877 to 1886 and from 1894 until his death in 1897.

== Biography ==
José Rafael Orozco González was born in Alajuela, Costa Rica, on 13 December 1842. He was the son of Rafael Orozco y Rojas and Marcelina González y Pérez. He married María Elena Castro Fernández, daughter of José María Castro Madriz, who served as president of Costa Rica.

He obtained a law degree in Honduras and subsequently pursued a career in public service and academia. He worked as a lawyer for the National Bank of Costa Rica and served as prosecutor for the National Treasury. From April to December 1873, he was Undersecretary of Finance and Commerce.

Orozco González was appointed a magistrate of the Supreme Court of Justice on several occasions, starting on 1877. He served as president of the court during the 1880–1881, 1881–1882, and 1882–1886 terms, remaining in the position until 1886.

Alongside his judicial and government responsibilities, Orozco was active in legal education and scholarship. At the University of Santo Tomás, he taught Roman law, international law, and criminal law. He drafted Costa Rica's 1880 Penal Code and published Elementos de Derecho Penal de Costa Rica (1882), a work dedicated to President Tomás Guardia Gutiérrez.

Orozo also served as honorary president of the Costa Rican Bar Association, corresponding member of the Royal Spanish Academy, and deputy director of the National Archives.

Orozco died in San José, Costa Rica, on 15 January 1897, while serving as a magistrate of the Chamber of Cassation.
