= Luis Paulino Mora Mora =

Costa Rican judge (1944–2013)

Luis Paulino Mora

50th President of the Supreme Court of Costa Rica
- In office 12 July 1999 – 17 February 2013
- Preceded by: Edgar Cervantes Villalta
- Succeeded by: Zarela Villanueva Monge

Magistrate of the Supreme Court of Costa Rica
- In office 27 September 1989 – 17 February 2013
- Preceded by: Seat established
- Succeeded by: Nancy Hernández López
- In office 7 September 1983 – 8 May 1986
- Preceded by: Hugo Porter Murillo
- Succeeded by: Mario Houed Vega

Minister of Justice and Grace
- In office 8 May 1986 – 27 September 1989
- President: Óscar Arias Sánchez
- Preceded by: Hugo Muñoz Quesada
- Succeeded by: Maruja Chacón Pacheco

Personal details
- Born: Luis Paulino Mora Mora; 8 April 1944 Santiago de Puriscal, Costa Rica
- Died: 17 February 2013 (aged 68) San José, Costa Rica
- Education: University of Costa Rica (LLB); Complutense University of Madrid (LL.D.)

Luis Paulino Mora Mora (8 April 1944 – 17 February 2013) was a Costa Rican judge and politician who served as the 50th President of the Supreme Court of Costa Rica from 1999 until his death in 2013.

He served as Criminal Judge and Juvenile Judge of Limón (1969-1975), First Criminal Judge of San José (1975), and Superior Criminal Judge of San José (1975-1983). In 1983, he was elected as Magistrate of the Third Chamber of Cassation of the Supreme Court of Justice, a position he held until his resignation in 1986.

From 1985 to 1986 he was director of the Technical Assistance Area of the Latin American Institute of the United Nations for the Prevention of Crime and Treatment of Offenders (ILANUD). From 1986 to 1989, he served as Minister of Justice and Grace in the first administration of Óscar Arias Sánchez.

In September 1989, the Legislative Assembly elected him as a magistrate of the newly established Constitutional Chamber of the Supreme Court of Justice of Costa Rica for the 1989-1997 term, and he was re-elected in 1997 and 2005. In 1999, he was elected President of the Supreme Court of Justice.

He died in San José on 17 February 2013, at the age of 68.
