= Rafael Ramírez =

Rafael Ramírez may refer to:

- Rafael Ramírez (baseball), Dominican baseball player
- Rafael Ramírez (politician) (born 1963), Venezuelan politician
- Rafael Ramírez (footballer) (born 1992), Mexican footballer
- Rafael Ramírez Hidalgo (1805–1875), Costa Rican politician and jurist
- One name for Ángel Maturino Reséndiz, the "Railroad killer"
