= Chaverri =

Chaverri is a surname. Notable people with the surname include:

- José Joaquín Chaverri Sievert (born 1949), Costa Rican diplomat
- Carlos Meléndez Chaverri (1926–2000), Costa Rican historian
