= Víctor Guardia Quirós =

Costa Rican Supreme Court justice (1879–1959)

40th President of the Supreme Court of Costa Rica
- In office 5 May 1938 – September 1945
- Preceded by: Luis Dávila Solera
- Succeeded by: Enrique Guier Sáenz

Magistrate of the Supreme Court of Costa Rica
- In office 5 May 1938 – September 1945
- In office 5 May 1908 – 16 August 1915
- Succeeded by: Ramón Bustamante Castro

Deputy of the Constitutional Congress
- In office 1 May 1916 – 27 January 1917
- Constituency: San José Province

Under Secretary of Foreign Affairs (Note: Simultaneously Under Secretary for the portfolios of Public Instruction, Justice, Grace, Worship and Charity.)
- In office 1907–1908
- President: Cleto González Víquez
- Preceded by: Juan Rafael Argüello De Vars
- Succeeded by: Pedro Yglesias Flores

Personal details
- Born: José Víctor Rogelio Guardia Quirós; 16 September 1879 Costa Rica
- Died: 2 November 1959 (aged 80) San José, Costa Rica
- Relatives: Tomás Guardia Gutiérrez (uncle)
- Education: University of Paris (LLB)
- Occupation: Lawyer; judge; professor; writer

José Víctor Rogelio Guardia Quirós (16 September 1879 – 2 November 1959) was a Costa Rican jurist, writer and politician who served as the 40th President of the Supreme Court of Justice from 1938 to 1945. He also held several judicial and government positions, served as a deputy of the Constitutional Congress, and was a member of the Costa Rican Academy of Language.

== Biography ==
José Víctor Rogelio Guardia Quirós was born in Costa Rica, on 16 September 1879. He was the son of Víctor Guardia Gutiérrez, brother of former president Tomás Guardia Gutiérrez, and Esmeralda Quirós Morales. He married Joaquina Uribe Rodríguez.

He obtained his law degree from the University of Paris in 1897 and subsequently served as a civil judge in Alajuela. From 1907 to 1908, he was Undersecretary of Foreign Affairs and held additional ministerial responsibilities. He also served as acting head of the Secretariat of Foreign Affairs from October 1907 to January 1908.

In 1908, Guardia was appointed a magistrate of the First Chamber of Appeals, serving until 1912. He continued as a magistrate from 1912 until his resignation in August 1915. That same year, he was elected to the Constitutional Congress as a representative of San José for the "Fusión" alliance, serving from 1916 until the coup d'état of 1917. In 1921, during the Coto War between Costa Rica and Panama, he commanded a battalion of Costa Rican forces.

In 1938, Guardia became president of the Chamber of Cassation and the Supreme Court of Justice of Costa Rica, positions he held until 1945.

In addition to his judicial and political career, Guardia was active in academic and literary circles. He was a professor at the Law School of Costa Rica, where he taught civil and commercial law. His legal publications included Prontuario de la legislación y jurisprudencia (1904) and Redacción de leyes mercantiles. He also published Escarceos literarios (1938), a collection of articles on literary and other subjects.

He was a member of the Costa Rican Academy of Language, joining in 1951 and occupying Chair S until his death. He was also named an honorary member of the Honduran Bar Association. In journalism, he served as director of the newspaper La República and regularly contributed to the Costa Rican press.

Guardia died in San José on 2 November 1959, aged 80.

== See also ==
- List of presidents of the Supreme Court of Costa Rica
