= Carmen Venegas =

Costa Rican electrical engineer and pilot

Carmen Venegas (c. 1912 – 1991) was a noted Costa Rican electrical engineer and pilot. Also known as Carmen Venegas Campos, or Carmencita Zeledon Venegas, she was the first Latin American woman to earn a degree in engineering at Virginia Polytechnic Institute (now known as Virginia Tech), the first woman to obtain her pilot's license in Central America, and the first woman to drive an electric locomotive.

== Early life and education ==
At an early age, Venegas was interested in mechanics and locomotives. Her father was a mechanic who owned his own shop, and this shop was where she learned how to operate different locomotive machines. In 1930, she conducted a train from San Jose to Puntarenas, Costa Rica at the age of 18. Her communication with President Cleto González Víquez allowed her to gain employment working on railroads in Costa Rica. Impressing the Costa Rican government with her work, she was awarded one of two scholarships given annually by her home country and enrolled at Virginia Tech in 1935.

At Virginia Tech, she joined the American Institute of Electrical Engineers and was the only woman in the organization at that time. She also helped found the Short Wave Club, training other students in radio operations. Furthermore, she was known as a pilot. She proposed the creation of an Aeronautics Club at Virginia Tech. In 1937, she was invited by the National Intercollegiate Flying Club to watch air races in Miami, Florida. Venegas flew her own 40-horsepower airplane that she kept in Lynchburg to Washington, D.C., where she met the convoy to watch the races. She was the only Virginia-based pilot to join the flight. She graduated from Virginia Tech in 1938 with a Bachelor of Science in electrical engineering.

== Career ==
At the end of her junior year of college, Venegas spent the summer back in Costa Rica working as an engineer at the Costa Rica Electric Light and Power Company.

After graduating from Virginia Tech, she applied to work on the Panama Canal but was turned down because of her sex. Not to be deterred, she flew out to the Panama Canal Zone where she was soon hired, becoming the first woman engineer to work on the canal.

After working on the power transmission problems of the Panama Canal, she returned in 1942 to the United States, where she worked as an application engineer in the government department of the Westinghouse Electrical International Company. She was the company's first woman engineer. At Westinghouse, she helped supply the United Nations with electrical equipment, which assisted the Allied Powers during the World War II. Venegas worked on handling technical engineering problems that arose in supplying generators and other necessary machinery to the Allies.

Venegas eventually pursued a career in performing and painting. Moving to Los Angeles, she attended the University of California Los Angeles studying music and art. She married Meade A. Livesay and began performing under the name "Carmen Lesay."
