= 1886 Costa Rican general election =

- 21–23 February 1886 (popular vote); 4 April 1886 (electoral college)
- Presidential election

542 members of the Electoral College 272 votes needed to win
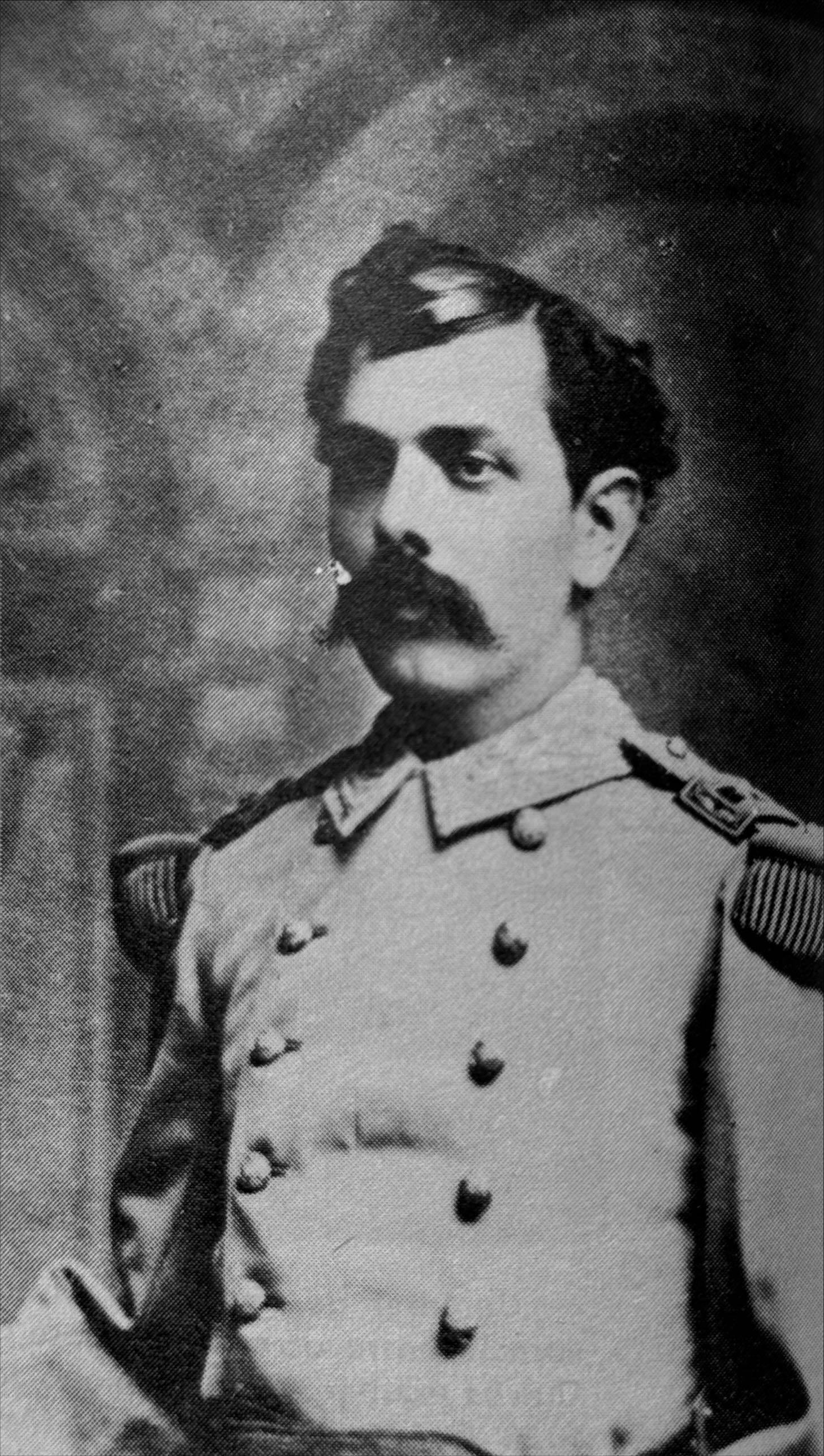
Nominee	Bernardo Soto Alfaro
Party	Independent
Electoral vote	547
Percentage	100%
President before election
Bernardo Soto Alfaro
Independent
Elected President
Bernardo Soto Alfaro
Independent
- Legislative election
- 16 of the 29 seats in the Constitutional Congress
Party	Seats	+/–
Independent	16	+16
This lists parties that won seats. See the complete results below.
Results by province

General elections were held in Costa Rica on 21–23 February 1886 to elect the president and half of the Constitutional Congress. Incumbent president Bernardo Soto, who had assumed office in 1885 as First Designate following the unexpected death of Próspero Fernández, was elected to a full constitutional term.

These were the last general elections held before the emergence of organized political parties in Costa Rica and the last won by a military officer.

== Background ==
The 1882 general election had resulted in the uncontested victory of the government-backed candidate, General Próspero Fernández Oreamuno, who was the brother-in-law of President Tomás Guardia Gutiérrez. Guardia had ruled under an unconstitutional regime since 11 September 1877. Shortly before his death in June 1882, he issued a decree restoring the 1871 Constitution with several reforms, including the abolition of the death penalty, a measure proposed by First Lady Emilia Solórzano Alfaro. The reinstated constitutional framework required the election of national authorities for the 1882–1886 term.

President Fernández presided over a liberal and strongly anti-clerical administration. During his tenure, Congress enacted a broad secularization agenda that transferred responsibilities traditionally held by the Catholic Church since the colonial period—such as public education, civil registration, and cemetery administration—to the state. These policies generated significant opposition among conservative sectors and ecclesiastical authorities.

Tensions culminated on 18 July 1884, when Fernández, together with Secretary of the Interior Bernardo Soto Alfaro, signed a decree expelling Bishop Bernhard August Thiel from the country. The decree also ordered the expulsion of priests belonging to the Society of Jesus. Fernández and Soto, both liberals and Freemasons associated with the Olympus Generation of intellectuals, justified these measures by accusing the clergy of excessive interference in political affairs, education, and state-led secularization policies, including those affecting cemeteries and church lands. The decree stated that there was "a clear tendency to overrule the State in its highest functions." Soto Alfaro had been appointed by Congress as First Designate to the Presidency in June 1883.

Following the sudden death of President Fernández in Atenas on 12 March 1885, Bernardo Soto assumed the presidency for the remainder of the constitutional term and announced his intention to seek election in his own right. At the time, Soto was 30 years old and faced the challenge of leading the country during the War of Reunification initiated by Guatemalan president Justo Rufino Barrios, who sought to re-establish the Federal Republic of Central America. The conflict, which began on 28 February 1885, placed significant political and military demands on Soto’s nascent administration and shaped the broader context of the ensuing electoral process.

== Electoral system ==
The election was conducted under the electoral law of 20 June 1870 with modifications enacted through a congressional decree on 16 June 1885. Under this framework, control of the electoral process was concentrated in the Executive Branch, particularly in the president and the Secretary of the Interior and Police. Provincial electoral boards were appointed by the executive and presided over by the respective provincial governors. These boards oversaw the vote count and appointed cantonal boards, which were chaired by the political chiefs and, in turn, designated district boards responsible for compiling voter registers.

The electoral process followed a two-stage system of indirect voting. In the first stage, eligible male citizens voted publicly to select second-degree electors. In the second stage, these electors chose the president by secret ballot. Eligibility to serve as an elector generally required property ownership and literacy, which meant that electors were drawn primarily from wealthier sectors and the middle class.

The same body of electors also selected the deputies to the Constitutional Congress for four-year terms. Electoral assemblies were held in the capital city of each province and were presided over by the provincial governor, who was appointed by the president.

== Campaign ==
The election was initially expected to be contested between two factions within Costa Rica’s liberal movement: the ruling Olympus faction, represented by Bernardo Soto Alfaro, and an opposition liberal faction. Following Fernández’s death, Soto put forward his candidacy to continue in office for the 1886–1890 term.

Potential opposition coalesced around General Víctor Guardia Gutiérrez, the uncle by marriage of Soto’s wife and the brother of former president Tomás Guardia Gutiérrez. However, Soto’s government employed a range of coercive measures that ultimately prevented Guardia’s candidacy from fully developing. According to contemporary accounts and later memoirs, Guardia’s supporters were harassed and persecuted, with several reportedly detained or exiled to remote regions such as Sarapiquí and Talamanca.

Press repression also accompanied these actions. F. B. Campuzano, editor of the newspaper El Nacional, which had supported Guardia’s candidacy since its founding in February 1884, was arrested, imprisoned for a month, and held incommunicado before being transferred to San Lucas Island. His offices were searched, and his papers were seized in an effort to uncover evidence against Guardia. In his memoirs, Guardia recalled being warned by an unnamed minister in Soto’s government that continued resistance could result in imprisonment under fabricated charges. According to Guardia, the minister advised him that Soto was determined to retain power “without pausing to consider the means,” and that a secret investigation was allegedly underway to implicate him in a conspiracy.

Amid mounting pressure and in an effort to halt the persecution of his associates, Guardia published a manifesto in El Nacional announcing his withdrawal from the race. In it, he cited the lack of electoral guarantees, expressed gratitude to his supporters, and declared his willingness to accept the outcome of the election. Following Soto's inauguration, Thiel and the religious orders were permitted to return in May 1886.

== Results ==
In Alajuela there were 140 electors, but 145 voted.

Among the 16 deputies elected to the Constitutional Congress were Andrés Venegas García (San José), José María Soto Alfaro (Alajuela), Máximo Fernández Alvarado (Alajuela) and Manuel de Jesús Jiménez Oreamuno (Cartago).

Candidate	Party	Electoral College first round		Electoral College second round	
Candidate	Party	Votes	%	Votes	%
Bernardo Soto Alfaro	Independent	542	100.00	547	100.00
Total		542	100.00	547	100.00
Source: TSE

=== Second round results by province ===
Province	Soto
San José Province	168
Alajuela	140
Cartago Province	90
Heredia	75
Guanacaste	42
Puntarenas	21
Limón	6
Total	542
Source: Salazar

=== Constitutional Congress ===
Party	Seats	
Party	Won	Total
Independent	16	29
Total	16	29
Source: Álvares & Girón

Constituency	Independent	
Constituency	%	Seats
San José		5
Alajuela		5
Cartago		3
Heredia		1
Guanacaste		0
Puntarenas		1
Limón		1
Total		16
Source: Álvares & Girón
