= José Simeón Guerrero de Arcos y Cervantes =

Nicaraguan-born lawyer and judge

José Simeón Guerrero de Arcos

1st, 4th & 6th President of the Supreme Court
- In office 22 January 1834 – 4 November 1836
- Preceded by: Atanasio Gutiérrez y Lizaurzábal
- Succeeded by: Luz Blanco y Zamora
- In office 18 July 1831 – 11 October 1832
- Preceded by: José Sacasa y Méndez
- Succeeded by: Atanasio Gutiérrez y Lizaurzábal
- In office 1 October 1826 – 2 August 1827
- Preceded by: Office established
- Succeeded by: Agustín Gutiérrez y Lizaurzábal

Personal details
- Born: José Simeón Guerrero de Arcos y Cervantes

José Simeón Guerrero de Arcos y Cervantes was a Nicaraguan-born lawyer and judge who served as the 1st, 4th and 6th President of the Supreme Court of Justice of Costa Rica, holding the office from 1826 to 1827, from 1831 to 1832, and from 1834 to 1836. He was among the earliest members of Costa Rica's judiciary following independence and played a leading role in the organization of the country's first high court.

== Early life and education ==
José Simeón Guerrero de Arcos y Cervantes was born in León, Nicaragua, the son of Fernando Guerrero de Arcos and Gertrudis Cervantes. He married Ana Bolandi y Ulloa.

He obtained a law degree, possibly from the University of León.

== Career ==
He served as subdelegate of the Intendancy of the Subtiava District. In 1823, he was elected as a deputy to the Constituent Assembly of the United Provinces of Central America, although he never took his seat. At the time, Guerrero was serving as a magistrate of the Territorial Court of Justice of León. In 1824, he was appointed by the Superior Governing Junta of Costa Rica to serve on the newly established Costa Rican judiciary and subsequently moved to San José. On 1 August 1825, he was elected Regent of the Superior Court of Justice. Although he accepted the appointment, the court did not begin operating immediately because a sufficient number of magistrates had not yet been appointed.

When the Superior Court formally started its functions on 1 October 1826, Guerrero became its first president. He served in that capacity until the court was dissolved at the end of 1827. He continued as a magistrate from 1828 to 1830 and was subsequently elected president of the court on two further occasions, serving from 1831 to 1832 and from 1834 to 1836.

== Death ==
In 1836, Guerrero returned to Nicaragua, where he is believed to have died. His widow, Ana, did return to Costa Rica and died in San José in July 1869, at the age of 78.
