= Orlando Aguirre Gómez =

Costa Rican lawyer and judge (born 1943)

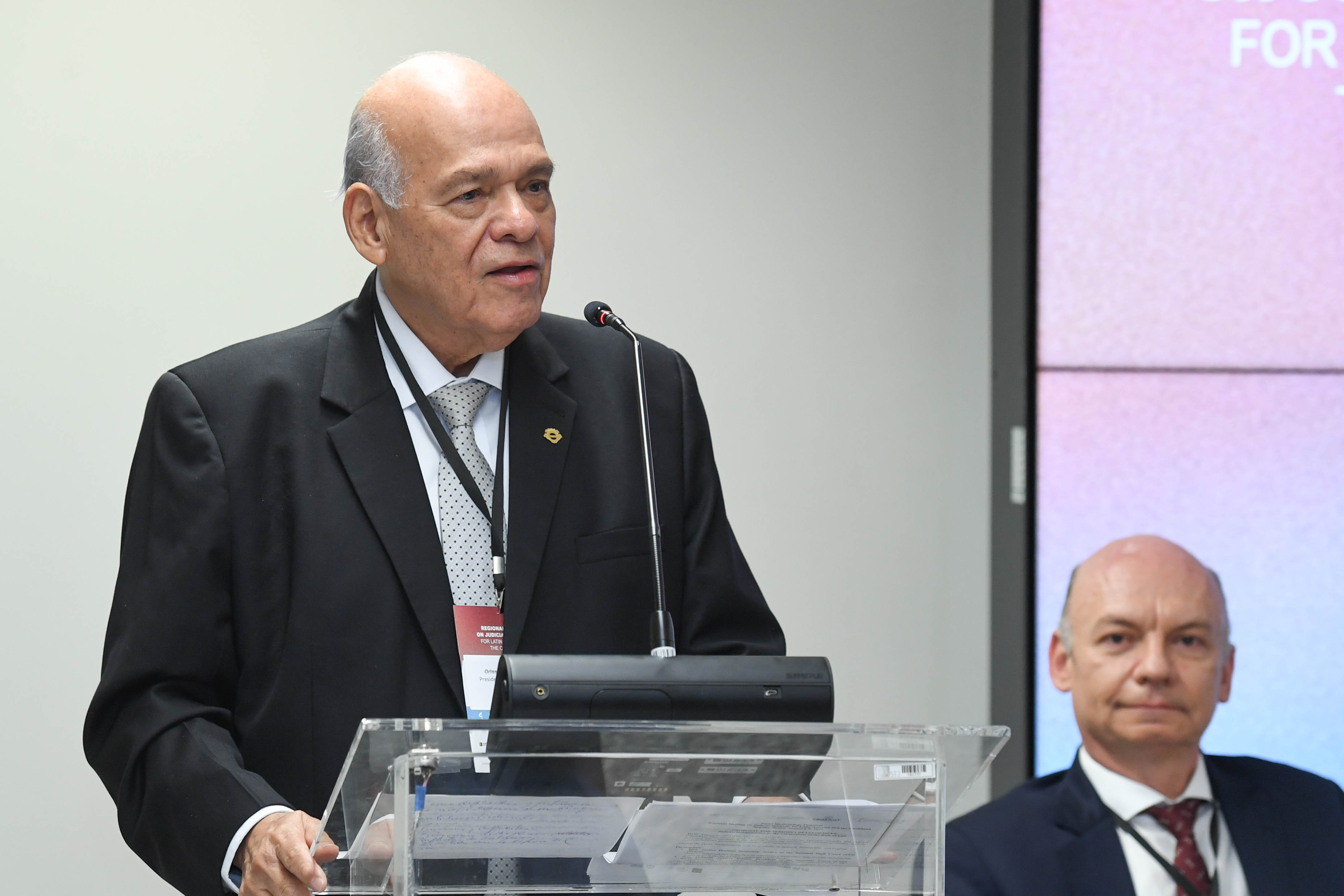

54th President of the Supreme Court of Costa Rica
- Incumbent
- Assumed office 26 September 2022
- Preceded by: Fernando Cruz Castro

Magistrate of the Supreme Court of Costa Rica
- Incumbent
- Assumed office 13 January 1989
- Preceded by: Eduardo Ching Murillo

Personal details
- Born: Catalino Orlando de Jesús Aguirre Gómez; 23 March 1943 (age 83) Puntarenas, Costa Rica
- Spouse: Petronila Quirós Mora (m. 1976)
- Education: University of Costa Rica (LLB)
- Occupation: Lawyer; judge; professor

Catalino Orlando de Jesús Aguirre Gómez (born 23 March 1943) is a Costa Rican judge and academic who has served as the 54th President of the Supreme Court of Justice since 2022. He has been a magistrate of the Second Chamber of the Supreme Court since 1989, making him the court's longest-serving sitting member.

He previously served as President of the Second Chamber from 1991 to 2022 and as President of the Council of the Judiciary from 1993 to 2022. Before his appointment to the Supreme Court, Aguirre served as a civil judge in the Costa Rican judiciary.

His tenure at the highest level of the judiciary has been marked by tensions with the Executive Branch and critical assessments in public opinion surveys, largely due to the fact that, during his presidency, Costa Rica recorded its three deadliest years in terms of homicides, reaching a peak of 905 murders in 2023, and experiencing a growing judicial backlog.

== Biography ==
Catalino Orlando de Jesús Aguirre Gómez was born on 23 March 1943 in Puntarenas, Costa Rica, the son of Otón Aguirre and Gloria Gómez.

According to his own account, he began his career in the Costa Rican Judiciary as a janitor at the Civil Court of Puntarenas. He subsequently served in a variety of support positions, including court officer and prisoner escort, while continuing his education. At the time he entered judicial service in 1964, he had completed only primary schooling, and later pursued both secondary and university studies while working within the judicial system. He studied law at the University of Costa Rica, earning a Bachelor of Laws degree in October 1976. He was admitted as a notary public in January 1978.

Aguirre began his judicial career in 1976 as a misdemeanour and minor claims judge in Aserrí. The following year, he was appointed minor claims judge in Tibás. From 1977 to 1979, he served as court clerk of the Second Civil Court of San José. He subsequently held the positions of First Civil Judge of San José (1979–1983) and Superior Civil Judge of San José (1983–1989).

In January 1989, the Legislative Assembly elected Aguirre as a magistrate of the Second Chamber of the Supreme Court of Justice, which has jurisdiction over labour and family law matters. He succeeded Eduardo Ching Murillo, who had retired on December 1988. Over the following decades, Aguirre became one of the court's longest-serving members and its most senior magistrate. He presided over the Second Chamber from 1991 to 2022, and the Council of the Judiciary from May 1983 to September 2022.

Alongside his judicial career, Aguirre pursued an academic career in legal education. He taught property law (ius in re) at the Faculty of Law of the University of Costa Rica in 1981 and later taught succession and insolvency law from 1982 onward. Between 1987 and 1988, he also taught inheritance law at a private university.

Aguirre has participated extensively in judicial training programs for judges and court personnel and has taken part in numerous national and international seminars and workshops on the administration of justice.

On 1 August 2022, Aguirre was elected by his fellow magistrates as the 54th President of the Supreme Court of Justice of Costa Rica, succeeding Fernando Cruz Castro after 19 rounds of voting. At the time of his election, he was the most senior member of the court, having served as a magistrate of the Second Chamber since 1989.
