= Fernando Cruz Castro =

Costa Rican lawyer and judge (born 1949)

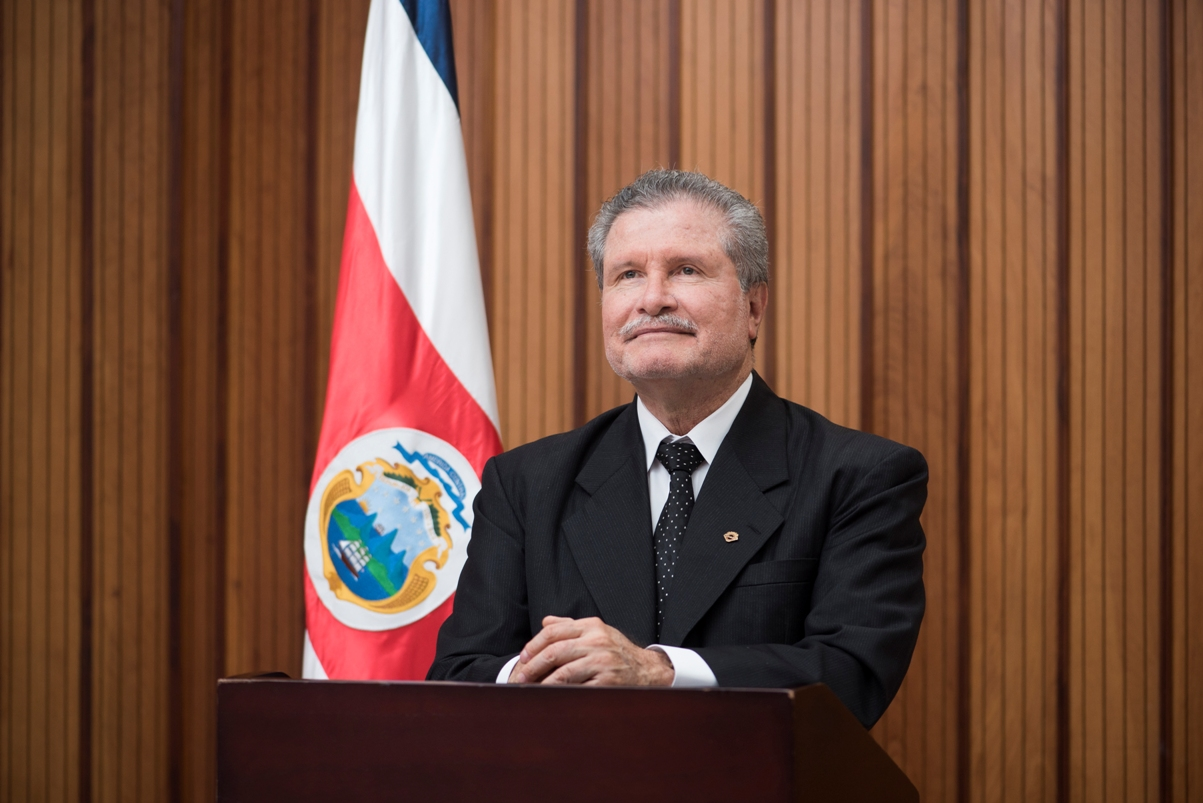
- Cruz in 2020

53rd President of the Supreme Court of Costa Rica
- In office 1 August 2018 – 26 September 2022
- Preceded by: Carlos Chinchillia Sandí
- Succeeded by: Orlando Aguirre Gómez

Magistrate of the Supreme Court of Costa Rica
- Incumbent
- Assumed office 14 October 2004
- Preceded by: Carlos Arguedas Ramírez

Personal details
- Born: Fernando Cruz Castro; 25 January 1949 (age 77) San José, Costa Rica
- Spouse: Virginia Chacón Vega (m. 1979)
- Education: University of Costa Rica (LLB); Complutense University of Madrid (LL.D.)
- Occupation: Lawyer; judge; professor

Fernando Cruz Castro is a Costa Rican lawyer and judge who served as the 53rd President of the Supreme Court of Justice of Costa Rica from 2018 to 2022.

== Early life ==
He has a degree in Law from the University of Costa Rica and holds a Law Doctorate from the Complutense University of Madrid.

== Career ==
He began his career as an agent of Faults and Misdemeanor in Alajuela in 1972, where he served as a public prosecutor, general prosecutor, general judge, superior judge and president of the Court of Criminal Cassation. He was appointed as magistrate of the Constitutional Chamber, replacing Carlos Arguedas Ramírez, who retired in 2004.

On 15 November 2012, 38 legislators of the Legislative Assembly did not re-elect Cruz, who received votes only from the benches of the Citizen Action Party, the Accessibility Without Exclusion Party and independent deputies José María Villalta and Luis Fishman. The then leader of the faction of the ruling National Liberation Party, Fabio Molina, stated that it was a call for attention to the Judiciary. The opposition accused the ruling party of forging a political vendetta since Cruz had voted against the interests of the National Liberation Party, such as the presidential re-election, the Dominican Republic–Central America Free Trade Agreement and the Crucitas mining case. His dismissal caused protests from citizens and staff of the Judiciary, as well as the condemnation of the International Association of Judges. Fishman filed an appeal before the Constitutional Chamber of the Supreme Court arguing that the vote was taken at the wrong time, resulting in Cruz' automatic re-election. The substitute magistrates who heard the appeal agreed and Cruz was reinstated.

Preceded by Carlos Chinchilla Sandí	President of the Supreme Court of Justice of Costa Rica; 2018-	Succeeded by
