= Fernando Coto Albán =

Costa Rican jurist (1919–1989)

46th President of the Supreme Court of Costa Rica
- In office 1 July 1975 – 16 May 1983
- Preceded by: Fernando Baudrit Solera
- Succeeded by: Ulises Odio Santos

Magistrate of the Supreme Court of Costa Rica
- In office 8 June 1967 – 28 September 1989
- Preceded by: Evelio Ramírez Chaverri
- Succeeded by: Rodrigo Montenegro Trejos

Personal details
- Born: Fernando Coto Albán; 30 October 1919 San José, Costa Rica
- Died: 28 September 1989 (aged 69) San José, Costa Rica
- Education: University of Costa Rica (LLB)
- Occupation: Lawyer; judge

Fernando Coto Albán (30 October 1919 – 28 September 1989) was a Costa Rican jurist who served as the 46th President of the Supreme Court of Justice from 1975 to 1983. He was a magistrate of the court from 1967 until his death in 1989.

== Biography ==
Coto was born in Cartago, Costa Rica, on 30 October 1919. He was the son of Manuel Coto Arias and Ernestina Albán Cordero. He married Virginia Martén Pagés.

He began working in the Judiciary in 1941, while studying law. His early positions included process server, clerk, and assistant secretary at the First Civil Magistrate's Court for Small Claims. He obtained his law degree in 1947 and was subsequently appointed a judge in Limón, serving until 1948.

From 1948 to 1951, he served as a criminal judge for public finance matters. He was subsequently appointed First Civil Judge of San José, a position he held from 1951 to 1963.

In 1967, the Legislative Assembly elected him a magistrate of the First Chamber (Chamber of Cassation) of the Supreme Court of Justice. He was re-elected to his seat in the Court in 1975 and 1983. Following the death of Fernando Baudrit Solera in 1975, Coto Albán was elected president of the Chamber of Cassation and president of the Supreme Court of Justice. He held these positions until 1983, when he declined to be considered for a second term.

Coto continued serving as a magistrate of the Chamber of Cassation until his death in San José on 28 September 1989, aged 69.
