= Zarela Villanueva Monge =

Costa Rican retired judge (born 1952)

51st President of the Supreme Court of Costa Rica
- In office 13 May 2013 – 13 May 2017
- Preceded by: Luis Paulino Mora Mora
- Succeeded by: Carlos Chinchilla Sandí

Magistrate of the Supreme Court of Costa Rica
- In office 11 October 1989 – 13 May 2017
- Preceded by: Hugo Eliécer Picado Odio
- Succeeded by: Roxana Chacón Artavia

Personal details
- Born: Zarela María Villanueva Monge; 24 May 1952 (age 74) Cartago, Costa Rica
- Education: University of Costa Rica (LLB); Distance State University (MA)

Zarela María Villanueva Monge (born 24 May 1952) is a Costa Rican lawyer and retired judge who served as the 51st President of the Supreme Court of Costa Rica from 2013 to 2017. She served as a magistrate of the Second Chamber of the Supreme Court from 1989 until her retirement in 2017 and was the first woman to hold the presidency of the Costa Rican Supreme Court.

== Early life and legal career ==
Villanueva was born in Cartago on 24 May 1952, the daughter of politician Jorge Luis Villanueva Badilla, a three-time deputy of the National Liberation Party. She graduated in law from the University of Costa Rica, where she served as president of the Law Students' Association between 1975 and 1976. She later specialized in agricultural law and earned a postgraduate degree in social and family violence from the Distance State University (UNED).

She began her judicial career in 1976, serving as judicial mayor of Turrialba Canton before entering the judiciary. She subsequently worked as a district attorney in Heredia, investigative judge and district attorney in Paraíso, Cartago, judge of first instance in civil and labor matters in Cartago until 1987, and later as a higher court judge in criminal and labor cases.

In 1989, the Legislative Assembly appointed Villanueva as a magistrate of the Second Chamber of the Supreme Court of Justice, where she specialized in labour and family law. She was elected Vice President of the Supreme Court in 2010. Following the death of Supreme Court President Luis Paulino Mora Mora in 2013, she served as acting president before being elected by the full court as the 51st President of the Supreme Court in May 2013, becoming the first woman to hold the office in Costa Rican history. She remained president until her retirement on 13 May 2017. Villanueva was succeeded in her seat by Roxana Chacón Artavia.

== Honors and personal life ==
In 2007, Villanueva was inducted into the Galería de las Mujeres de Costa Rica (Gallery of Women of Costa Rica), which recognizes women for their contributions to the country's development.

Her brother, Luis Gerardo Villanueva Monge, also a member of the National Liberation Party, served as a deputy in the Legislative Assembly and was President of the Legislative Assembly from 2010 to 2011.

Legal offices
Preceded by Luis Paulino Mora Mora	President of the Supreme Court of Justice of Costa Rica; 2013–2017	Succeeded by Carlos Chinchilla Sandí
