= Benito Serrano Jiménez =

Costa Rican judge and politician (1850–1945)

34th President of the Supreme Court of Costa Rica
- In office 25 May 1915 – 8 May 1916
- Preceded by: Alejandro Alvarado García
- Succeeded by: Ezequiel Gutiérrez Iglesias

Magistrate of the Supreme Court of Costa Rica
- In office 8 May 1922 – 8 May 1926
- In office 11 July 1888 – 27 January 1917

Personal details
- Born: Benito Serrano Jiménez; 19 March 1850 San José, Costa Rica
- Died: 23 December 1945 (aged 95) San José, Costa Rica
- Education: University of Santo Tomás (LLB)

Benito Serrano Jiménez (19 March 1850 – 23 December 1945) was a Costa Rican lawyer and politician who served as the 34th President of the Supreme Court of Justice from 1915 to 1916. He served as a magistrate from 1888 to 1917 and from 1922 to 1926.

== Biography ==
Serrano was born in San José, Costa Rica, on 19 March 1850. He was the son of Anastasio Serrano y Valdivieso, a native of New Granada, and Juanita Jiménez y Castro. He married Celina Thompson y McQuillen, a British national. He obtained a law degree from the University of Santo Tomás in 1876. In August 1881, he was elected treasurer of the first board of directors of the Costa Rican Bar Association.

Serrano subsequently held several positions in the judiciary and public administration. His appointments included judicial mayor of San José, Undersecretary of Finance, Commerce, and Public Instruction, deputy prosecutor of the Republic, administrative litigation judge, magistrate of the First Chamber of Appeals, and magistrate of the Chamber of Cassation. He was first appointed by Congress to the Court in July 1888, and was later re-appointed nine consecutive times until 1915.

In 1915, following the resignation of Alejandro Alvarado García, he was elected president of the Supreme Court of Justice to complete the latter's term. He remained in judicial office until the 1917 coup d'état.

Following the 1921 parliamentary election, the Constitutional Congress appointed him a magistrate for a four-year term. He subsequently retired from the judiciary.

Serrano died in San José, Costa Rica, on 23 December 1945, aged 95.
