= Fernando Baudrit Solera =

Costa Rican jurist and academic (1907–1975)

45th President of the Supreme Court of Costa Rica
- In office 11 May 1955 – 12 June 1975
- Preceded by: Jorge Guardia Carazo
- Succeeded by: Fernando Coto Albán

Magistrate of the Supreme Court of Costa Rica
- In office 5 September 1952 – 12 June 1975
- Preceded by: Francisco Ruiz Fernández
- Succeeded by: Ulises Odio Santos

Rector of the University of Costa Rica
- In office 1946–1952
- Preceded by: José Joaquín Jiménez Núñez
- Succeeded by: Rodrigo Facio Brenes

Personal details
- Born: Rafael Fernando Baudrit Solera; 23 October 1907 Heredia, Costa Rica
- Died: 12 June 1975 (aged 67) San José, Costa Rica
- Party: PUN (1948)
- Occupation: Lawyer; judge; professor

Rafael Fernando Baudrit Solera (23 October 1907 – 12 June 1975) was a Costa Rican jurist and academic who served as the 45th President of the Supreme Court of Costa Rica from 1955 until his death in 1975.

Born in Heredia, he was the son of Oscar Baudrit González and Carmen Solera Pérez. He married Adilia Gómez Mesén. He graduated from the Law School of Costa Rica. He was a professor and dean of the College of Law at the University of Costa Rica, rector of the university from 1946 to 1953, member of the National Constituent Assembly of 1949, and president of the Bar Association.

He was selected to be Magistrate of the Chamber of Annulment of the Supreme Court of Costa Rica for the period 1955–1963, and was later re-appointed for the periods 1963–1971 and 1971–1979, although he died during the latter.

He presided over the Chamber of Annulment and the Supreme Court as a whole from 1955 until his death. His term as president of the Supreme Court is the longest in Costa Rican history and is considered one of the most brilliant. He was succeeded by the Fernando Coto Albán.
