= Tobías Zúñiga Castro =

Costa Rican politician

Tobías Zúñiga Castro (February 10, 1854 – June 24, 1918) was a Costa Rican politician. He served as a diplomat and was Secretary of State. He was a member of the People's Party.

He was born in San Jose, Costa Rica, on February 10, 1854. He was the son of Pedro Zúñiga y Meléndez. He married Rosario Montúfar, the daughter of Lorenzo Montúfar, on November 7, 1875. He was Secretary of the Interior, police and promotions from April 30 to July 20, 1889.

In the election of 1905, he ran for President against Máximo Fernández Alvarado, Bernardo Soto Alfaro, Cleto González Víquez, and Ezequiel Gutiérrez Iglesias. For the run-off election scheduled to occur in April 1906, Fernández and Soto threw their support behind him. It seemed likely that he would win, but in March 1906, President Esquivel suspended civil liberties and had him expelled from the country. He, Fernandez, and Soto fled to New York City. Cleto González Víquez became president.

After a time, he returned from exile, but had no further involvement in politics. He died in San José on June 24, 1918.

== See also ==
- Tobías Zúñiga Castro on Spanish Wikipedia
