= Marco Vinicio Vargas Pereira =

Costa Rican politician

Marco Vinicio Vargas Pereira (born August 30, 1954) is a Costa Rican politician. He was Deputy Minister of Foreign Affairs of Costa Rica.
