= Gerardo Guzmán Quirós =

Costa Rican jurist and politician (1874–1959)

43rd President of the Supreme Court of Costa Rica
- In office 11 May 1948 – 8 November 1949
- Appointed by: Founding Junta of the Second Republic
- Preceded by: José María Vargas Pacheco
- Succeeded by: Jorge Guardia Carazo

Magistrate of the Supreme Court of Costa Rica
- In office 5 May 1920 – 8 November 1949
- Preceded by: Francisco Solórzano Chaverri
- Succeeded by: Jorge Guardia Carazo
- In office 19 May 1915 – 12 April 1917
- Preceded by: Francisco Solórzano Chaverri
- Succeeded by: Francisco Solórzano Chaverri

Personal details
- Born: Gerardo Guzmán Quirós; 18 October 1874 Heredia, Costa Rica
- Died: 9 December 1959 (aged 85) San José, Costa Rica

Gerardo Guzmán Quirós (18 October 1874 – 9 December 1959) was a Costa Rican jurist and politician who served as the 43rd President of the Supreme Court of Costa Rica from 1948 to 1949.

== Personal data ==
Born in San Jose, Costa Rica, on October 18, 1874, he was the son of Don and Dona Victoria Jacinto Guzman Quirós Marin. He married Dona Celina Ulloa Flores.

== Studies and public office ==
He began his public career as manager of the telegraph office messengers of San Jose and in 1894 was promoted to telegraph. He studied at the School of Law and graduated as a lawyer in 1903, the year he was appointed civil judge in Heredia.

From 1915 to 1917 he was magistrate of the First Civil Chamber and in 1917 returned to civil judgeship of Heredia. From 1920 to 1949 he was continuously re-appointed as magistrate of the First Civil Chamber and the Chamber of Cassation.

From 1947 to 1948 he was judge of the National Electoral Court of Costa Rica, from 1948 to 1949 President of the Supreme Court of Costa Rica and the Court of Appeals from 1949 to 1953, and Minister of the Interior and related portfolios from 1949 to 1950.

== Death ==
He died in San Jose, Costa Rica, on December 9, 1959.
