= Elections in Costa Rica =

Costa Rica elects a president (who is the head of state), two vice-presidents and a legislature. The President of Costa Rica and the vice-presidents are elected for a four-year term by the people. The Legislative Assembly (Asamblea Legislativa) has 57 members, elected for four-year terms by closed list proportional representation in each of the country's seven provinces. Voting is mandatory for registered citizens under Article 93 of the Constitution of Costa Rica, but this is not enforced.

== History ==
Prior to the 1913 election, elections in Costa Rica were indirect. Secret ballots were introduced in 1926 and fully implemented by 1953.

== Schedule ==
=== Election ===
Position	2018	2019	2020	2021	2022
Type	Presidential (February); National Congress (February)	None	Municipal (February)	None	Presidential (February); National Congress (February)
President and vice president	President and vice president	None	None	None	President and vice president
National Congress	All seats	None	None	None	All seats
Provinces, cities and municipalities	None	None	All positions	None	None

=== Inauguration ===
Position	2018	2019	2020	2021	2022
Type	Presidential (May); National Congress (May)	None	Municipal (May)	None	Presidential (May); National Congress (May)
President and vice president	8 May	None	None	None	8 May
National Congress	1 May	None	None	None	1 May
Provinces, cities and municipalities	None	None	1 May	None	None

== See also ==
- List of political parties in Costa Rica
