= Ezequiel Gutiérrez Iglesias =

Costa Rican politician

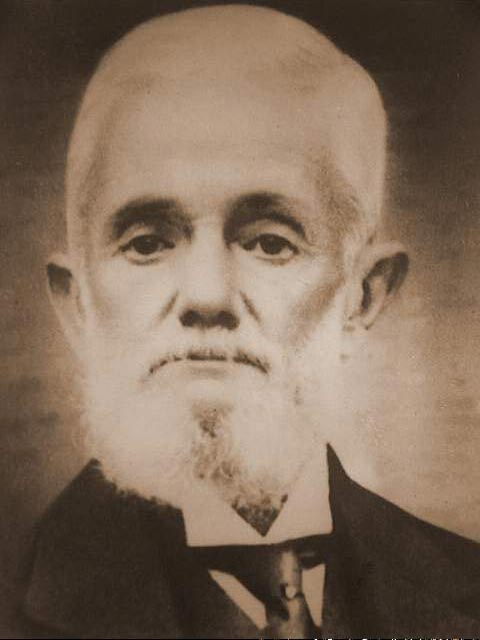

Third Designate to the Presidency
- In office 11 April 1917 – 2 September 1919
- President: Federico Tinoco Granados
- Preceded by: Francisco Aguilar Barquero
- In office 8 May 1910 – 8 May 1914
- President: Ricardo Jiménez Oreamuno
- Preceded by: José Astúa Aguilar
- Succeeded by: Francisco Aguilar Barquero

35th President of the Supreme Court
- In office 8 May 1916 – 19 April 1917
- Preceded by: Benito Serrano Jiménez
- Succeeded by: Ascensión Esquivel Ibarra

President of the Constitutional Congress
- In office 1 May 1910 – 30 April 1913
- Preceded by: Ricardo Jiménez Oreamuno
- Succeeded by: Máximo Fernández Alvarado

Deputy of the Constitutional Congress
- In office 1 May 1910 – 30 April 1914
- Constituency: Cartago Province

Secretary of Foreign Affairs
- In office 8 May 1890 – 27 July 1891
- President: José Rodríguez Zeledón
- Preceded by: Ricardo Jiménez Oreamuno
- Succeeded by: Pedro León-Páez y Brown
- In office 12 August 1889 – 26 September 1889
- President: Bernardo Soto Alfaro
- Preceded by: Cleto González Víquez
- Succeeded by: Ricardo Jiménez Oreamuno

Personal details
- Born: Ezequiel Gutiérrez Iglesias; 23 August 1840 Cartago, Costa Rica
- Died: 22 August 1920 (aged 79) San José, Costa Rica
- Party: Peliquista Party (1917–1919)
- Other political affiliations: Republican (Before 1917); Democratic Union (1906); Constitutional Democratic (1889–1890)

Ezequiel Gutiérrez Iglesias (23 August 1840 - 22 August 1920) was a Costa Rican jurist and statesman who served as the 35th President of the Supreme Court from 1916 to 1917.

Ezequiel Gutiérrez Iglesias was born in Cartago, Costa Rica, on 23 August 1840. He was the son of Francisco de Paula Gutiérrez y La Peña-Monje and Ramona Iglesias Llorente. He married Josefina Braun Bonilla.

Gutiérrez Iglesias pursued secondary studies in Guatemala and graduated with a bachelor's degree in law (Licenciado en Leyes) from the University of St. Thomas (Universidad de Santo Tomás), where he was also a professor of grammar and philosophy.

He held numerous public offices, especially in the educational, diplomatic, and judiciary fields: a teacher at the Cartago Liceo de Niñas (Girls' School), functionary of the Ministry of Foreign Affairs and associated portfolios (1862–1864), Attaché (1864–1866) and Chargé d'affaires (1866–1869) for Costa Rica in the United States of America, Secretary of the Costa Rican Legation in Europe (1868–1869), Inspector General of Schools (1869–1870), Representative for Cartago in the National Constitutional Convention (1870), and Counselor for the Costa Rican Legation in Peru and Chile (1870–1871).

Gutiérrez Iglesias began his work in the Supreme Court of Justice of Costa Rica as a minister (1871) and from 1876 to 1877 was a magistrate, an office from which he resigned to serve as the Costa Rican chargé d'affaires in Great Britain from 1877 to 1878. For his opposition to the dictatorship of President Tomás Guardia Gutiérrez, he was exiled from 1879 to 1882. After that, he was interim Judge of the National Treasury (1883), Minister Plenipotentiary of Costa Rica in the United States of America (1884), Financial Agent in Great Britain and Minister Plenipotentiary in El Salvador (1885). In 1886, he was newly elected as a magistrate, an office which he again resigned in August 1889 to fulfill the office of Secretary of Foreign Affairs and associated portfolios, from which he in turn resigned the next month and then again fulfilled from 1890 to 1891. In 1886, he was a member of the San José Charities Board and in 1893 Minister Plenipotentiary of Costa Rica in Nicaragua and Honduras. The Democratic Union party proposed him as a candidate for the presidency in the elections of 1906.

In 1910, he was elected a deputy for Cartago for the Republican Party, and later appointed Third Designate to the Presidency. He presided over the Constitutional Congress from 1910 to 1913 and in the fulfillment of this office he was chosen in 1912 to be the Costa Rican delegate at the centennial celebration of the Constitution of Cadiz (Spanish Constitution of 1812).

From 1913 to 1918, he was the alternate magistrate for Costa Rica on the Central American Court of Justice and from 1914 to 1916 he directed the National Archives. In 1916, Congress elected him to be President of the Supreme Court of Justice for the 1916-1920 period, which was to be interrupted in April 1917 when it named a new court as a result of the military coup that occurred in January of that year and the subsequent election of Federico Alberto Tinoco Granados. From 1917 to 1919, he was Third Designate to the presidency.

== Death ==
Gutiérrez Iglesias died in San José, Costa Rica, on 22 August 1920.
