= Eusebio Figueroa Oreamuno =

Costa Rican lawyer and politician (1827–1883)

Secretary of Foreign Affairs (Note: Simultaneously in charge of the portfolios of Public Instruction, Worship and Charity.)
- In office 2 April 1883 – 11 August 1883
- President: Próspero Fernández Oreamuno
- Preceded by: José María Castro Madriz
- Succeeded by: José María Castro Madriz

24th President of the Supreme Court
- In office 3 August 1876 – 10 October 1878
- Preceded by: Vicente Sáenz Llorente
- Succeeded by: Miguel Macaya de la Esquina

First Designate to the Presidency
- In office 8 May 1869 – 27 April 1870
- President: Jesús Jiménez Zamora
- Preceded by: Jesús Jiménez Zamora
- Succeeded by: Rafael Barroeta Baca

Prosecutor of the Supreme Court of Justice
- In office 1 May 1864 – 5 May 1868
- Preceded by: José Concepción Pinto Castro
- Succeeded by: Juan José Ulloa Solares

Personal details
- Born: Eusebio Figueroa Oreamuno; 5 November 1827 Cartago, Costa Rica, Federal Republic of Central America
- Died: 11 August 1883 (aged 55) San José, Costa Rica
- Party: Independent

Eusebio Figueroa Oreamuno (5 November 1827 – 11 August 1883) was a Costa Rican jurist, academic and politician who served as Secretary of Foreign Affairs in 1883. He previously served as the 24th President of the Supreme Court from 1876 to 1878.

Earlier in his career, he held a number of public offices in Nicaragua, including director of the official gazette, congressman, army prosecutor, diplomat, and minister plenipotentiary. He died after being wounded in a prominent duel with Minister to Spain León Fernández.

== Biography ==
Figueroa was born in Cartago on 5 November 1827, the son of Antonio Figueroa, a native of the Canary Islands, and Ramona Oreamuno Jiménez. Orphaned at an early age, he moved to Nicaragua, where he settled in Granada and completed his primary and legal studies at the Universidad Oriental. After obtaining his doctorate in law, he was admitted to the Costa Rican Bar on 3 May 1853.

While residing in Nicaragua, Figueroa held several public offices. He served as director of La Gaceta, the country's official gazette, as a member of the Nicaraguan Congress, army prosecutor, secretary of the Nicaraguan legations in Guatemala and France, and minister plenipotentiary to the Central American republics.

Figueroa returned permanently to Costa Rica in 1862. The following year, he was appointed Minister Plenipotentiary to El Salvador and married María Cristina Espinach Bonilla in Cartago. He subsequently held numerous public offices in Costa Rica. He served as editor of the Gaceta Oficial, and as prosecutor of the Supreme Court of Justice from 1864 to 1868. In May 1868, he was appointed a magistrate of the Supreme Court, resigning later that year to become Secretary of State for the Interior, War, Public Works, and Justice in the administration of President Jesús Jiménez Zamora.

Figueroa was vice president of the Constituent Assembly of 1869 and was elected First Designate to the Presidency. In that capacity, he exercised the executive power on 21 and 22 May 1869 during President Jiménez's temporary absence. As Secretary of War, he reorganized the military establishment, reducing the influence of senior military commanders who had played a dominant role in national politics during the preceding decades.

He later undertook a mission to the United Kingdom to negotiate a loan intended to finance construction of the proposed National Road. In May 1876, he returned to the Supreme Court as a magistrate and, on 3 August of that year, was elected President of the Court, serving until October 1878. Figueroa also played a leading role in Costa Rica's legal profession. He promoted the establishment of the Costa Rican Bar Association, created by Decree No. 24 of 6 August 1881.

In 1883, President Próspero Fernández Oreamuno appointed him Secretary of State for Foreign Affairs, Public Instruction, Worship, and Charity. During his tenure, he proposed an ambitious program of educational reform and secured congressional approval of a budget of 100,000 pesos to expand the country's public school system. Although his plans were never fully implemented because of political circumstances and his death, they influenced subsequent discussions on educational reform.

Figueroa also had a distinguished academic career at the University of Santo Tomás. He taught law, served repeatedly on the University's governing board, and in 1866 was appointed its first Director. Following the election of José María Castro Madriz to the presidency, Figueroa succeeded him as rector on 19 May 1866. Together, Castro and Figueroa were among the principal figures in the development of the University during the nineteenth century.

On 11 August 1883, Figueroa died after being mortally wounded in a duel with historian and diplomat León Fernández Bonilla.
