= António Pinto Soares =

General Antonio Pinto Soares
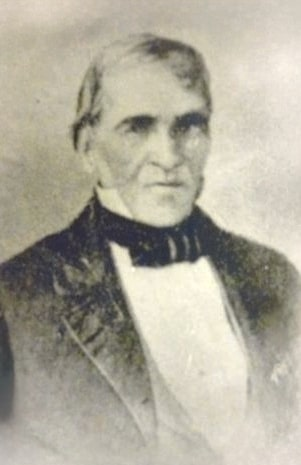

Head of State of Costa Rica Provisional
- In office 11 September 1842 – 27 September 1842
- Preceded by: Francisco Morazán
- Succeeded by: José María Alfaro Zamora

Personal details
- Born: Antonio Luiz Pinto Soares; 1780 Porto, Kingdom of Portugal
- Died: 6 April 1865 (aged 84–85) San José, Costa Rica
- Spouse: María del Rosario Castro Ramírez
- Parent(s): Alexandre Pinto; María Custodia Soares
- Occupation: Military, Sailor
- Nickname: Tata Pinto

Military service
- Battles/wars: Battle of Ochomogo; League War; Overthrow of Francisco Morazán

António Pinto Soares also known as Tata Pinto (1780 – 6 April 1865), was Head of State of Costa Rica from 11 to 27 September 1842. He led the popular uprising that overthrew Francisco Morazán.

== Early life and family ==
Born in Porto, Portugal, in 1780 to wealthy parents Alexandre Pinto and María Custodia Soares. He was a marine merchant and settled in Costa Rica circa 1810. He married María del Rosario Castro Ramírez on 26 April 1813, in San José. She was daughter of Francisco Castro y Alvarado and María de la Trinidad Ramírez y Ulloa. From this marriage he had fifteen children: José Dolores, Fernando, Mercedes, José Antonio, Baltazar, Petronila, José Antonio Raimundo, Francisca, Liborio, José Concepción, Jesús, Francisco, José, Manuel, and Remigio (all by the surnames of Pinto Castro).

== Public and private activities ==
He dedicated himself to sea trade, coffee agriculture, and commerce although he also served in the military and earned the rank of General. He commanded the Republican artillery units during the 1823 Battle of Ochomogo, served as Costa Rica's Commandant of Artillery, Prosecutor for the 1823 Special Tribunals, Second in Command of the Provincial Battalion for the Disciplined Militias, General Internal Commandant and lastly General Arms Commandant. He also aided the government during the 1835 Civil War before retiring from military service. After this he served as mayor of San José for several terms.

== Head of State ==
In September 1842, when discontent with Francisco Morazán had peaked and the country was on the brink of a war with Nicaragua, Pinto led a popular uprising to overthrow him. He became Head of State on 11 September 1842, but he did not desire this power and peacefully conceded to José María Alfaro Zamora who was elected as Temporary Head of State by a collection of nobles from the different cities in the country.

During his brief administration, Soares restored relations with the rest of Central America which had been broken with Morazán's rise to power and had even led to an alliance by them against his administration. The government of El Salvador granted him the rank of Division General.

== Later achievements and death ==
From September 1842 to April 1844 he once again served as General Arms Commandant.

He had great difficulties with the Juan Rafael Mora Porras administration, which in 1851 accused him of plotting against the government. This led to a criminal case being opened against him and his son Liborio but this was interrupted shortly after.

He died in San José on 5 April 1865.

Political offices
Preceded by Francisco Morazán	Head of State of Costa Rica; September 1842	Succeeded by José María Alfaro Zamora
