= Percy Rodríguez =

Costa Rican politician

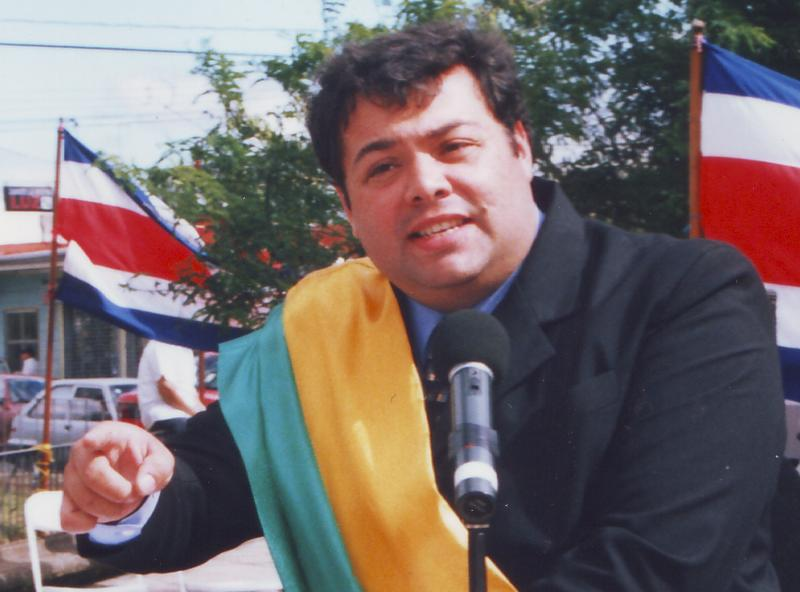
Percy Rodríguez in 2003

Percy Kenneth Rodríguez Argüello is a Costa Rican politician, writer, international analyst and diplomat. He was mayor of the Municipality of Tibás for the period 2003-2007.

He was born in the canton of Tibás. He graduated from the Buenaventura Corrales School where he attended primary school. He graduated as a Historian from the University of Costa Rica, as a Magister Scientae in International Relations and Diplomacy, with emphasis on Latin American Affairs from the National University and as a Master in Communication and Marketing from the Latin University of Costa Rica.

He was the first mayor appointed in the first democratic elections held in the canton of Tibás, verified on December 1, 2002, for the period 2003-2007.
