= Narciso Esquivel y Salazar =

Costa Rican politician

Narciso Esquivel y Salazar (died 1876) was a Costa Rican politician. He was a signer of the Costa Rican Act of Independence in 1821.

He was married to Ursula Saenz Ulloa. His son Aniceto Esquivel Sáenz later became President of Costa Rica.
