= List of presidents of the Supreme Court of Costa Rica =

Head of the Supreme Court of Costa Rica

President of the Supreme Court of Justice of Costa Rica
- Logo of the Judiciary of Costa Rica
- Incumbent; Patricia Vargas González since 26 October 2026
- Style: Magistrate President
- Appointer: Supreme Court of Justice
- Term length: 4 years, renewable
- Constituting instrument: Fundamental Law of the State of Costa Rica
- Inaugural holder: José Simeón Guerrero de Arcos y Cervantes
- Formation: 25 January 1825
- Website: pj.poder-judicial.go.cr

The president of the Supreme Court of Justice is the head of the Supreme Court of Costa Rica, an office established in 1825 as Regent of the Superior Court. Under Article 159 of the Constitution, the president is elected by the magistrates of the Full Court (Corte Plena) for a four-year term and may be re-elected. Unlike the other magistrates of the court, who may be naturalized Costa Rican citizens after ten years of residence, the president must be a Costa Rican citizen by birth.

The president's responsibilities include convening and presiding over sessions of the Full Court, overseeing the implementation of its decisions, representing the Judiciary before the other branches of government and national and international organizations, and directing policies aimed at the administration and modernization of the judicial system. The office also carries responsibility for safeguarding judicial independence and promoting transparency, impartiality, and access to justice.

Since the Supreme Court was established in 1825 as the Superior Court, there have been 55 presidencies. The first was José Simeón Guerrero de Arcos y Cervantes (1826–1827).

== List of presidents of the Supreme Court ==
No.	Name	Notes	Period
Office vacant (1825–1826)
1	José Simeón Guerrero de Arcos y Cervantes	First Regent of the Superior Court of Costa Rica.	1826–1827
Office vacant (1827–1829)
2	Agustín Gutiérrez y Lizaurzábal	Elected in 1829, position ended in 1830 as a new Superior Court was elected according to a constitutional reform	1829–1830
3	José Sacasa y Méndez	Elected in 1830, resigned in 1831	1830–1831
4	José Simeón Guerrero de Arcos y Cervantes	Elected in 1831, suspended in 1832	1831–1832
5	Atanasio Gutiérrez y Lizaurzábal	Elected in 1832, position ended in 1833 as a new Court was elected according to constitutional reform	1832–1833
6	José Simeón Guerrero de Arcos y Cervantes	Elected in 1833, abandoned in 1836 and Superior Court was dissolved	1833–1836
7	Luz Blanco y Zamora	Interim Regent (1836–1837)	1836–1839
8	Pedro César y Urroz		1839–1841
9	Luz Blanco y Zamora		1841–1842
10	Manuel Mora Fernández	Position ended after Coup d'état that year (August–September)	1842
Office vacant (1842–1843)
11	Ramón Castro y Ramírez		1843–1844
12	Luz Blanco y Zamora		1845–1846
13	Eusebio Prieto y Ruiz	Appointed by Senate in 1846	1846–1847
14	Rafael Ramírez Hidalgo	Elected as Regent of the Superior Court in 1847	1847–1850
15	Juan Mora Fernández	Resigned	1850–1854
16	Rafael Ramírez Hidalgo		1854–1856
17	Vicente Herrera Zeledón		1856–1860
18	José María Castro Madriz		1860–1866
19	Manuel Alvarado y Barroeta	Appointed to finish the 1864–1868 term	1866–1868
20	José Gregorio Trejos Gutiérrez		1868–1869
21	Juan José Ulloa Solares	Regent between 1869–1873; President of the Supreme Court after 1870 when the Court was reorganized	1869–1870
22	José María Castro Madriz		1870–1873
23	Vicente Sáenz Llorente	Interim President (1873–1874)	1873–1876
24	Eusebio Figueroa Oreamuno		1876–1878
25	Miguel Macaya de la Esquina		1878–1880
26	Rafael Orozco González		1880–1886
27	José Antonio Pinto Castro	Appointed by Congress 1886–1890; died in office	1886–1887
–	Vicente Sáenz Llorente	Interim President	1887–1888
28	José Joaquín Rodríguez Zeledón	Elected to end Pinto's term, resigned in 1889	1888–1889
–	Vicente Sáenz Llorente	Interim President	1889–1890
29	Ricardo Jiménez Oreamuno	Resigned before time in 1892 due to President Rodríguez's dissolution of Congress	1890–1892
–	Ramón Carranza Ramírez	Interim President	1892–1894
30	Manuel Vicente Jiménez Oreamuno		1894–1898
31	José Joaquín Rodríguez Zeledón		1898–1902
32	Manuel Vicente Jiménez Oreamuno		1902–1904
33	Alejandro Alvarado García	Resigned one year before ending his term	1904–1915
34	Benito Serrano Jiménez		1915–1916
35	Ezequiel Gutiérrez Iglesias		1916–1917
36	Ascensión Esquivel Ibarra		1917–1920
37	Nicolás Oreamuno Ortiz		1920–1934
38	Octavio Béeche Argüello		1934–1935
39	Luis Dávila Solera		1935–1938
40	Víctor Guardia Quirós		1938–1945
41	Enrique Guier Sáenz	Until 8 May 1948	1945–1948
42	José María Vargas Pacheco	May 8–11; Appointed by ruling Junta; resigned soon after	1948
43	Gerardo Guzmán Quirós	Appointed by ruling Junta	1948–1949
44	Jorge Guardia Carazo		1949–1955
45	Fernando Baudrit Solera	Died in office	1955–1975
46	Fernando Coto Albán		1975–1983
47	Ulises Odio Santos		1983–1986
48	Miguel Blanco Quirós		1986–1990
49	Edgar Cervantes Villalta		1990–1999
50	Luis Paulino Mora Mora		1999–2013
51	Zarela Villanueva Monge	First woman to hold the office.	2013–2017
52	Carlos Chinchilla Sandí		2017–2018
53	Fernando Cruz Castro		2018–2022
54	Orlando Aguirre Gómez		2022–2026
55	Patricia Vargas González		2026 – present
