= Manuel María de Peralta y López del Corral =

Costa Rican politician

Manuel María de Peralta y López del Corral (died 1837) was a Costa Rican politician.

He was a signatory to the Act of Independence of the Republic of Costa Rica in 1821. He served as a representative to the national congress and was its president 1829 to 1830.

He was involved in Costa Rica's 1835 civil war but went into exile.

He died in Nicaragua in 1837.
