= Tomás Enrique Soley Soler =

Costa Rican politician

Tomás Enrique Soley Soler (1939–2001) was a Costa Rican politician who served as political ambassador to several countries.

He began as a diplomat for Costa Rica in 1965. He died as an ambassador to Costa Rica in Honduras in 2001.
