= Juan Fernando Echeverría =

Costa Rican politician

Juan Fernando Echeverría (May 30, 1812 – January 7, 1871) was a Costa Rican politician. He was born in Cartago, Costa Rica, to Pedro José de Alvarado y Baeza, the president of the provisional autonomous government from 1821 to 1822; and Concepción Echeverría y Arleguí. He married María Alvarado y Barroeta in San José, Costa Rica on May 25, 1850. His wife was the daughter of Manuel de Alvarado y Alvarado and Rosalía Barroeta y Baca.

On May 13, 1861, the Congress chose him as the Vice President of the Republic for the period of 1861 to 1862, but he resigned from the position on June 18, 1861. The Congress selected Juan González Reyes as his successor.

Echeverría died on January 7, 1871, in San José.
