= Rodolfo Aguirre Tinoco =

Mexican artist (1927–2019)

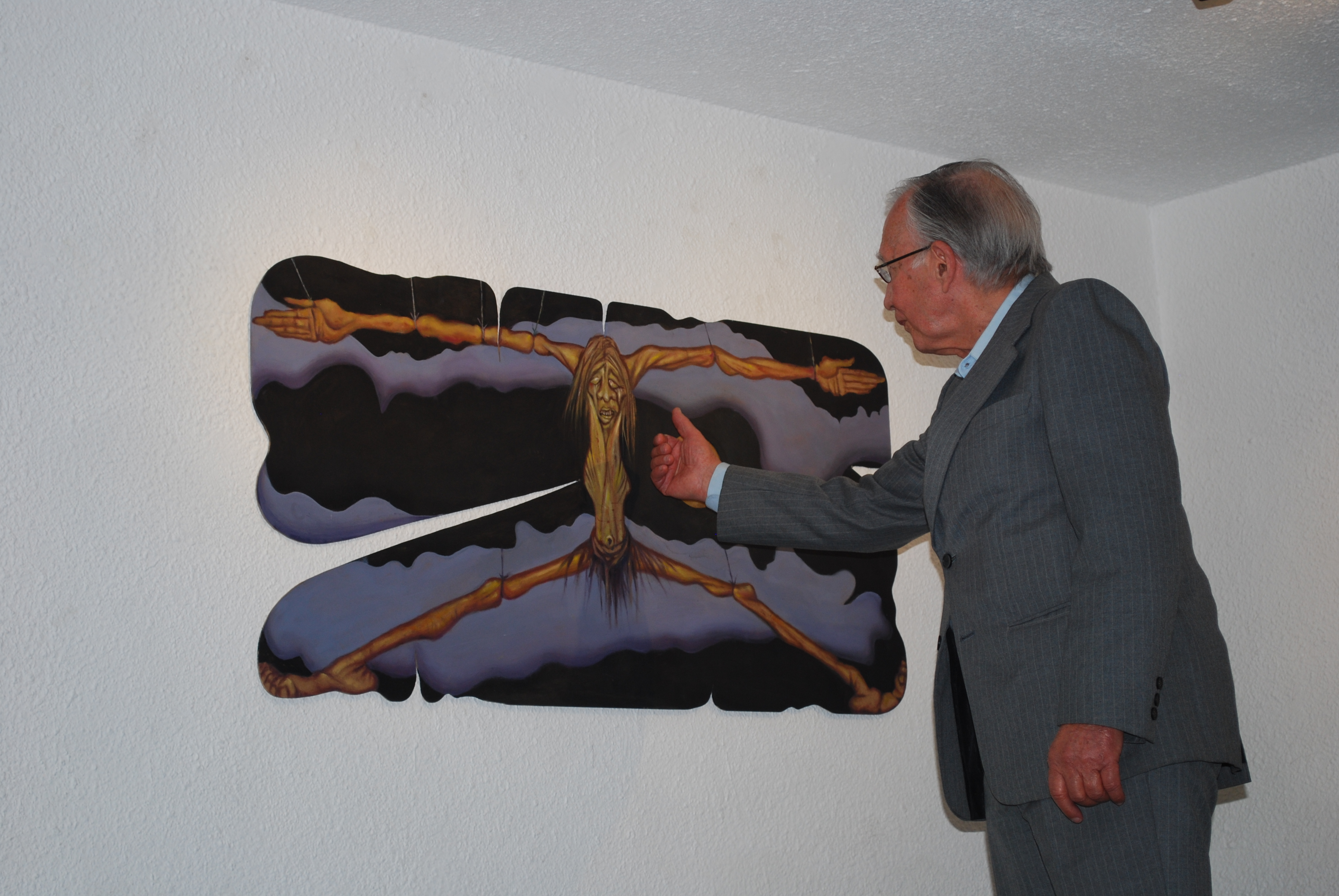
- odolfo Aguirre Tinoco demonstrating a work at the opening of Muroart at the Salón de la Plástica Mexicana
- Born: 1927
- Died: 14 June 2019 (aged 91); Mexico City, Mexico
- Education: Academy of San Carlos Escuela Nacional de Artes Plásticas
- Known for: painting and graphic arts

Rodolfo Aguirre Tinoco (1927 – 14 June 2019) was a Mexican artist.

Born in 1927, Aguirre Tinoco studied at the Academy of San Carlos, the Escuela Nacional de Artes Plásticas and the Escuela Nacional de Pintura, Escultura y Grabado "La Esmeralda".

Aguirre Tinoco had over 40 individual exhibitions and has participated in over 370 collective ones in both Mexico and abroad including the Palacio de Bellas Artes, the Museo Carrillo Gil, the Museo de Arte Moderno, the National Academy Galleries in New York and the Tokyo Metropolitan Teien Art Museum. His work can be found in the collections of the Mexican Engraving and Print Museum in Bulgaria, the Alfredo Guati Rojo National Watercolor Museum, the Museo de Arte Contemporáneo in Morelia and the Museo Amecatlel in Mexico City. He also exhibited at the Salón de la Plástica Mexicana, of which he was a member.

His work was a combination of free forms with elements which are done realistically in detail. His idea was to deepen the psyche of man, depicting both the negative and positive aspects of humanity in his art. His work often employed rough textured materials with dark, rich colors to indicate negativity and light, shiny colors on smooth surfaces to indicate the positive aspects of humanity. The main figures of his work are generally realistic with detail, especially his depictions of the female body which represent creation. However, there are elements of Expressionism in his work. Backgrounds are generally chaotic with abstractions, with shadows and light and broken faces, which the painter has called “psiquismo” (lit. psychism). Notable examples of this include El señor de las flores, Enigma, Lo que es arriba, a veces, no es abajo, La psiquis 28, Luces y sombras, Rostro de los 3 reinos No. 1 and Hombre apocalíptico de tierra, vegetal, animal de sentimientos y muerte.

Aguirre Tinoco lived in Mexico City. He died there on 14 June 2019, at the age of 91.
