= Juan de Obregón y Espinosa =

Central American politician

- Born: c.1600 Granada, Nicaragua
- Died: 1672 (aged 71–72); Nicaragua
- Occupation: Central American politician
- Known for: mayor of Granada and Nicoya in Nicaragua
- Notable work: Acting Governor of Nicaragua
- Spouse: Ana de Obando
- Father: Juan de Obregón

Juan de Obregón y Espinosa (c. 1600–1672) was a Central American politician who held offices under the Spanish Empire in present-day Nicaragua and Costa Rica.

== Early life and family ==
Born in about 1600 in Granada, Nicaragua, he was the son of Juan de Obregón, cavalry captain of the city of Granada, and Isabel de Espinosa. He married Ana de Obando, daughter of Bernardino de Obando and Juana Gómez. He died in Nicaragua.

== Career ==
He served twice as mayor of the city of Granada. In 1647 he became alderman of the Nicaraguan city of León. From 1663 to 1664 he was mayor of Nicoya, succeeding Lorenzo de la Madriz Paniagua in that position. On May 26, 1664, he was appointed Acting Governor of Costa Rica by General Martín Carlos de Mencos y Arbizu, president of the Audiencia of Guatemala, replacing Don Rodrigo Arias Maldonado y Góngora, who at the same time, at the direction of Mencos y Arbizu, took over Obregón y Espinosa's position as mayor of Nicoya.

Obregón y Espinosa assumed the role of Acting Governor on August 11, 1664, and held it until June 29, 1665, when he was replaced by Don Juan Lopez de la Flor y Reinoso, who had been appointed Governor by King Don Felipe IV on August 10, 1663. During his brief tenure, the Adelantado de Costa Rica Don Juan Fernandez de Salinas and Captain Juan de Vidamartel registered some mining deposits in area called Las Cóncavas, which was located one league from the city of Cartago, and another in a ravine in the valley of Aserrí, in the hill of the Coyotes, but they were not productive.

Upon stepping down from the role of Acting Governor, Obregón y Espinosa was again named mayor of Nicoya, a position he held until 1672. During the invasion of Eduard Mansvelt in 1666, he sent provisions to Costa Rica, which included 30 indigenous archers, 2 mulattos and 8 boletes or oarsmen, iron, lead, bows and arrows, "because it has no other weapons is strength of them". In 1667 he was commissioned by the Royal Court to go to the city of Nueva Segovia to investigate several accusations against the ordinary mayor Francisco de Bustamante.
