= Santos Velázquez y Tinoco =

Costa Rican politician

Santos Velázquez y Tinoco (born in León, Nicaragua, died in May 1846 in San José, Costa Rica) was a Costa Rican jurist.
