= Rafael Ramírez Hidalgo =

Costa Rican politician (1805–1875)

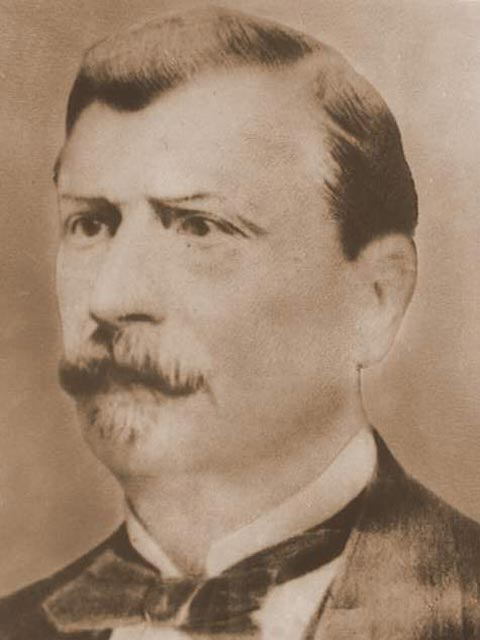
- Ramírez c. 1844

14th & 16th President of the Supreme Court
- In office 4 July 1854 – October 1856
- Preceded by: Juan Mora Fernández
- Succeeded by: Vicente Herrera Zeledón
- In office 14 May 1847 – 8 May 1850
- Preceded by: Eusebio Prieto y Ruiz
- Succeeded by: Juan Mora Fernández

Personal details
- Born: Rafael Ramírez Hidalgo; 1805 San José, Captaincy General of Guatemala, Spanish Empire
- Died: 14 September 1875 (aged 69–70) San José, Costa Rica

Rafael Ramírez Hidalgo (1805–1875) was a Costa Rican politician.

He was a member of the Constituent Assembly of 1838, 1859, 1869, 1870 and 1871, President of the House of Representatives from 1844 to 1845 and the Senate from 1862 to 1863 and judge on several occasions. He was the president of the Supreme Court of Costa Rica from 1847 to 1850 and from 1854 to 1855. He was also associate judge of the Supreme Court in 1859 and Secretary of State in 1873.

He was the author of the notes contained in the edition of the General Code of the State of Costa Rica from 1841 published in New York in 1858, which was declared official by the government of President Juan Rafael Mora Porras.

== Sources ==
- Loría, RO (1995). The legislative power in Costa Rica (in Spanish). Publications and Cultural Extension Section, Monsignor Sanabria Library, Legislative Assembly.
