= Alejandro Alvarado García =

Costa Rican jurist and politician (1839–1922)

33rd President of the Supreme Court of Costa Rica
- In office 8 May 1904 – 25 May 1915
- Preceded by: Manuel Vicente Jiménez Oreamuno
- Succeeded by: Benito Serrano Jiménez

Magistrate of the Supreme Court of Costa Rica
- In office 8 May 1895 – 25 May 1915
- In office 8 May 1890 – 29 March 1895
- In office 8 May 1876 – 28 August 1889
- In office 18 October 1870 – 8 May 1876

Secretary of Interior, Police and Public Works
- In office 14 November 1889 – 8 May 1890
- President: Carlos Durán Cartín (acting)
- Preceded by: Ricardo Jiménez Oreamuno (acting)
- Succeeded by: Joaquín Lizano Gutiérrez

Prosecutor of the Supreme Court of Justice
- In office 8 May 1876 – 8 August 1876
- Preceded by: José María Acosta
- Succeeded by: Mauro Fernández Acuña

Personal details
- Born: Alejandro Alvarado García; 9 January 1839 León, Nicaragua
- Died: 11 September 1922 (aged 83) San José, Costa Rica
- Education: Universidad de San Carlos de Guatemala (LLB)
- Occupation: Lawyer; judge; professor

Alejandro Alvarado García (9 January 1839 – 11 September 1922) was a Costa Rican jurist and politician who served as the 33rd President of the Supreme Court of Justice from 1904 to 1915. He was a member of the court on several occasions between 1870 and 1915 and served as Secretary of Interior and Police from 1889 to 1890.

== Biography ==
Alvarado was born in León, Nicaragua, on 9 January 1839. He was the son of Pedro Pablo Alvarado y Solano, a Costa Rican, and Ana María García y Matus, a Nicaraguan. He studied law at the University of San Carlos de Guatemala, where he obtained his law degree.

On 19 November 1871, he married Carolina Quirós Morales (1847–1941) in San José, Costa Rica. She was the daughter of José Antonio Quirós y Blanco and Juana Morales y Valverde. The couple had five children: José María (born 1872), Juan Alejandro Víctor Teodorico de Jesús (born 1873), Ana María Libia Carolina del Rosario (born 1874), Alejandro Alvarado Quirós (born 1876), and Federico Carlos Augusto (born 1881). Their son Alejandro Alvarado Quirós, originally named Alejandro Víctor Teodorico, became a lawyer and diplomat, while Federico pursued a career in medicine.

Alvarado García began his public career as Undersecretary of the Interior during the second administration of President José María Castro Madriz (1866–1868). He subsequently served as a judge in Alajuela and Puntarenas. In 1870, he was appointed a magistrate of the Supreme Court of Justice, beginning a judicial career that spanned several decades.

In 1887, he served as Rector of the University of Santo Tomás. In 1889, he represented Costa Rica at the Central American Unionist Conference in El Salvador. From 1889 to 1890, he served as Secretary of Interior, Police and Public Works.

In 1904, Alvarado García was elected president of the Supreme Court of Justice for the 1904–1908 term. He was subsequently re-elected for the 1908–1912 and 1912–1916 terms. He resigned in May 1915, before the end of his final term, citing health reasons.

Alvarado died in San José, Costa Rica, on 11 September 1922, aged 83.
