= José Joaquín Chaverri Sievert =

Costa Rican diplomat

José Joaquín Chaverri Sievert (born August 30, 1949) is a Costa Rican diplomat. In 2005 he was appointed Director of Foreign Policy of the Ministry of Foreign Affairs. He has also served as Costa Rican ambassador to Germany, Denmark and Czechoslovakia.
