= Gerardo Gómez Ramírez =

Costa Rican politician

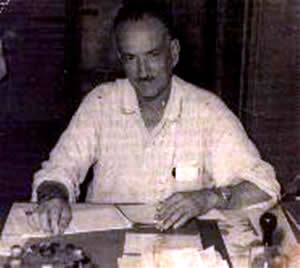
- Born: June 4, 1901; Cañas (canton)
- Died: November 5, 1983

Gerardo Gómez Ramírez (June 4, 1901 – November 5, 1983) was a Costa Rican politician.

On August 10, 1946, he participated in an artistic-literary evening that was organized in honor of the President of the Republic, Mr. Teodoro Picado and his wife.
