= Máximo Fernández Alvarado =

Costa Rican politician (1858–1933)

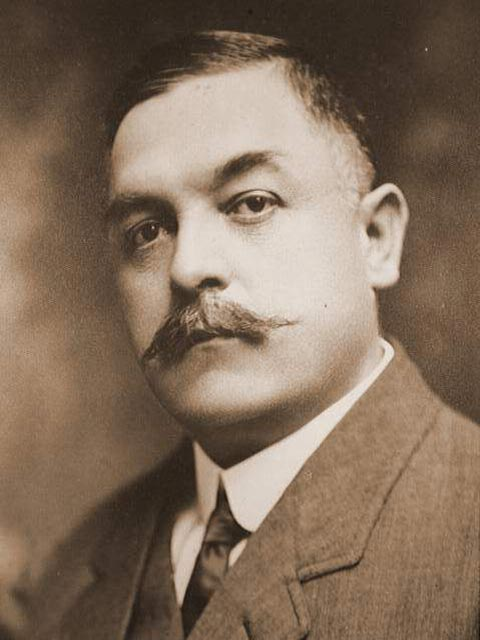
- Fernández Alvarado c.1900

President of the Constitutional Congress
- In office 1 May 1916 – 27 January 1917
- Preceded by: Leonidas Pacheco Cabezas
- Succeeded by: Arturo Volio Jiménez
- In office 1 May 1913 – 30 May 1914
- Preceded by: Ezequiel Gutiérrez Iglesias
- Succeeded by: Leonidas Pacheco Cabezas

Deputy of the Constitutional Congress
- In office 1 May 1912 – 27 January 1917
- Constituency: San José Province
- In office 1 May 1886 – 3 August 1888
- Constituency: San José Province

Secretary of Public Works
- In office 3 August 1888 – 1 May 1889
- President: Bernardo Soto Alfaro

Secretary of Interior and Police
- In office 3 August 1888 – 1 May 1889
- President: Bernardo Soto Alfaro

Personal details
- Born: 18 November 1858 Desamparados, Costa Rica
- Died: 10 February 1933 (aged 74) San José, Costa Rica
- Party: Republican Party (from 1897)
- Other political affiliations: Constitutional Democratic (1889–1890)
- Education: University of Santo Tomás
- Occupation: Politician; lawyer; businessman; journalist; writer

Máximo Fernández Alvarado (18 November 1858 – 10 February 1933) was a Costa Rican lawyer and politician.

Born in Desamparados in 1858, he graduated as a Bachelor in Philosophy and Letters at the University of Santo Tomas at fourteen years old and as a lawyer in the same institution in 1881 with merit.

He occupied several important positions, among them these are Secretary of State, Deputy and President of the Constitutional Congress 1913–1914 and 1916–1917. He founded the Partido Republicano, an ideology that combined doctrines of liberalism and populism, and was a candidate to the presidency in Costa Rican elections of 1902, 1906 and 1913. On several occasions he was exiled for political reasons. He also published a poetic anthology.

He died in San José in 1933.
