= Supreme Court of Justice of Costa Rica =

Highest court in Costa Rica

Coordinates: 9.9303°N 84.0697°W

- Building of the Supreme Court of Justice of Costa Rica
- Interactive map of Supreme Court of Justice of Costa Rica
- Established: January 25, 1825; 201 years ago
- Location: San José
- Website: https://pj.poder-judicial.go.cr

President of the Supreme Court of Justice
- Currently: Orlando Aguirre Gómez
- Since: September 26, 2022; 3 years ago

The Supreme Court of Costa Rica (Spanish: Corte Suprema de Justicia de Costa Rica) is the court of greater hierarchy of Law and Justice in Costa Rica.

Established on 25 January 1825, the current president of the Supreme Court of Justice is Fernando Cruz Castro since 1 August 2018. All of the courts in the country are dependent on the Supreme Court of Justice. Its organizational structure is based on three factors: the matter of the subjects to solve, the territory where they take place, and the quantity (amount of money that is involved in the subject).

The Supreme Court has 22 proprietary magistrates, 25 substitute magistrates in three first chambers and 12 substitute magistrates in the Constitutional Chamber. They are distributed of the following way: five in each one of the three Chambers of Annulment and seven in the Constitutional Chamber. They are nominated by the Legislative Assembly of Costa Rica every eight years.

== History ==
Within as little as two months from which they received the news of Independence, the Costa Ricans organized themselves politically and formed their own government. The representatives of different cities and towns formulated the Pact of Concord (Pacto Social Fundamental Interino de Costa Rica) on 1 December 1821, and is considered the first constitutional document of Costa Rica. In it they established the Joint Superior Government to exert the government functions and established the Supreme Court of Justice of Costa Rica to have an authority on law and order in the country, and to lay down the laws over the Spanish and Amerindian population.

By means of Decree V of 24 September 1824 dictated by the Constituent Assembly of Costa Rica of that year, the state was organized by three powers: The Legislative Authority, the Executive Authority and the Judicial Authority. In the judicial branch, the power would reside in the Superior Court of Justice.

Nevertheless, it was not until 25 January 1825, with the Fundamental Law of the Free State of Costa Rica, that the judicial branch took constitutional shape. The Court had numerous initial problems with installation. At this time Costa Rica had a high number of independent lawyers, which made it difficult to completely fulfill the obligations to the Court of Justice stipulated by the Political Constitution. Integration to this new hierarchy of legal authority was difficult for towns in the country where a supreme court was virtually unheard of.

Various elected governors of the Constitutional Congress resigned their positions before their installation, because of financial reasons. On 1 October 1826 the Court was put into operation, The first presidents of the Court were Nicaraguan and Guatemalan. It wasn't until 1842 that a Costa Rican, Manuel Mora Fernandez, held the position of President of the Supreme Court of Justice. The situation of Costa Ricans as presidents of the Court improved after 1843.

For a period of about 20 years, the justice administration was based on the laws of the native Indians. In 1841 Braulio Carrillo Colina, governor of Costa Rica, enacted the General Code that included three parts: civilian, penitentiary and procedures, which established the pillars of modern Costa Rican law. In 1843, José María Alfaro Zamora, who replaced Francisco Morazán, set up the Constituent Assembly. A year later, this Assembly formulated a new political constitution, in which it was named the Supreme Court of Justice (Corte Suprema de Justicia) for the first time and increased the number of magistrates to seven.

In 1851, Juan Rafael Mora Porras decreed the Statutory Law of the Judicial Power, that established the organization of justice and the means for legal authority to be conducted by means of election. The Constitution of 1859, summoned by the President Jose Maria Montealegre Fernandez, created a new position of Co-judge, that is today known as a Substitute Magistrate.

In the military coup of 1869, President José María Castro Madriz was overthrown, which provided the background to a revised new political constitution. The Court was divided in two Chambers: First and Second, and the number of magistrates temporarily increased to nine. The ascendancy of the general Tomás Guardia Gutiérrez to the presidency in 1871, saw the writing of a new constitution. It established that the Judicial Power of Costa Rica would be operated by the Supreme Court of Justice and other courts that the law established. In future, the Court would be divided into two Chambers under the responsibility of a president, the number of magistrates returned to seven and a public prosecutor was introduced. In addition, the election of the magistrates were arranged on behalf of the Legislative Assembly of Costa Rica.

The Statutory law of Courts in 1887 established for the first time the independence of the Judicial Power. There was an attempt to change the Constitution in 1917, but Francisco Aguilar Barquero, president in 1919-1920 was able to keep the 1871 constitution intact in the aftermath.

On 6 September 1937 the Statutory law of the Judicial Power was approved, which reaffirmed the principle of autonomy and established for the first time the division of the Supreme Court of Justice with a Chamber of Annulment, a Civilian Chamber and a Penitentiary Chamber. The number of magistrates increased to eleven. In 1940 the Court was reorganized again in four Courts of appeals, two civilians, two penitentiaries and one of annulment. From that moment it was conformed the Court to 17 magistrates. In 1948, there was an attempt to restore the Political Constitution of 1871, but on 7 November 1949 the Constituent Assembly drew up the revised Constitution that exists today.

Later, there were series of singular innovations in judicial organization. For example, a new Penal Code was introduced and two years later, a Code of Penal Procedures. With the reform of article 177 of the Political Constitution on 25 October 1956, the Judicial Power obtained economic independence of the others. On 30 April 1980, the Legislative assembly approved the Law of Reorganization of the Supreme Court of Justice to improve its organization and the distribution of the work.

With this disposition the Civilian and Penal Courts where converted to the Appellate Civil and Penal Court (Salas de Casación Civil y Penal), and the second instance y moved to the Superior Tribunal. Also said law the secretary of the courts obtained the capability of authenticating signatures of notary public and judicial functionaries.

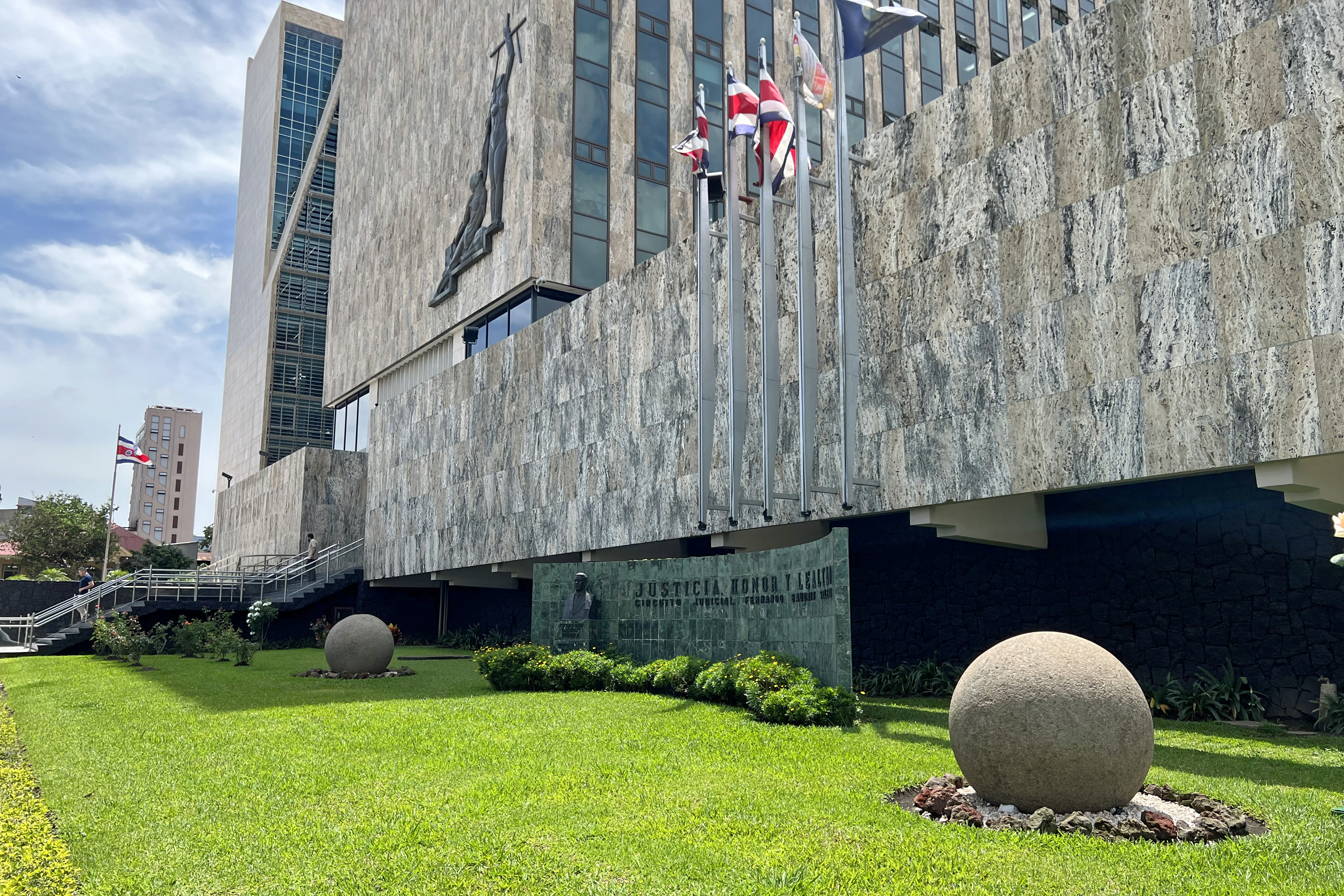
Main entrance to the Supreme Court building in San José, Costa Rica.

On June 2, 1982, the Legislative Assembly passed the Reform Law to article 162 of the Political Constitution, through which, the Supreme Court magistrates obtained the right to elect the court's president. In September 1989 the Assembly passed a new reform to the Constitution. This time articles 10, 48, 105, and 128 were modified, creating the Constitutional Chamber of the court or Sala Constitucional with the mandate that it served to receive and process declarations of unconstitutionality for any kind of laws and regulations and of acts subject to public legislation and made up of seven magistrates finally increasing the count to 22.

On 1 January 1994, Law #7333 substantially reformed the Organic Law of the Judicial Branch (Ley Orgánica del Poder Judicial). On 1 January 1998 the Judicial Reorganization Law (Ley de Reorganización Judicial) was created to reform the Penal Judicial Order. Also, it established a new organization and competency of judicial offices, partially reforming the Ley Orgánica del Poder Judicial and revoking other laws.

In spite of the multiple changes indicated above, the Judicial Branch has been one and the same in its spirit. Throughout the judicial history of the country, it has maintained itself strong, despite multiple attempts to weaken it.

== Functions ==
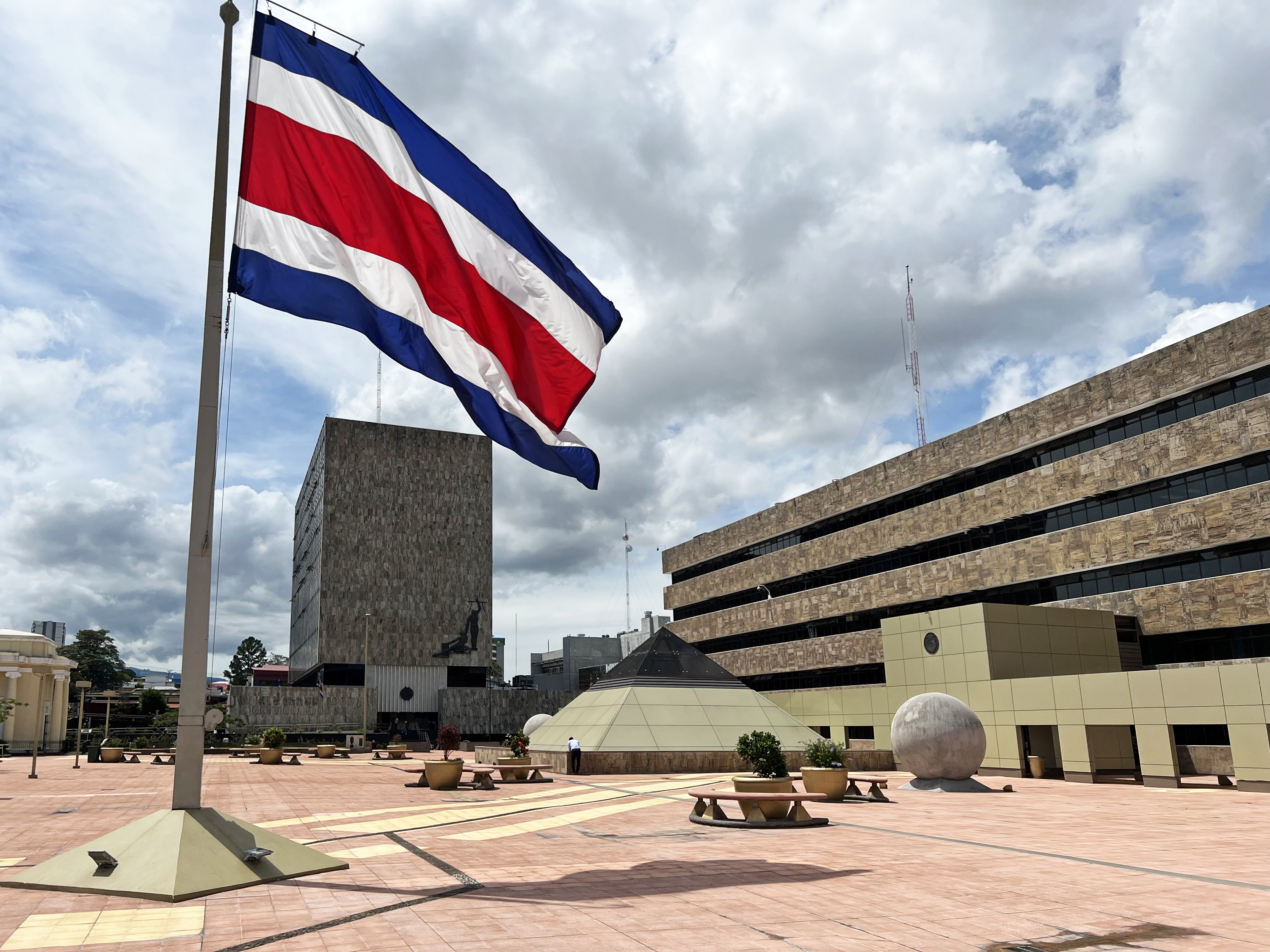
The Justice Plaza is located on the east side of the Supreme Court building.

The Supreme Court of Justice of Costa Rica has the following functions:

- To inform to the other Powers of the State in the subjects in which the Constitution or the laws determines that it is to be consulted and to give opinion when it is required about the projects of reform to the codified legislation or that which affect the organization or function of the Judicial Power.
- To propose the prescribed legislative reforms and an advisable judge to improve the administration of justice.
- To approve the budget of the Judicial Power, which once promulgated by the Legislative Assembly, will be able to enact by means of the council
- To name the proprietary and substitute members of the Supreme Court of Elections.
- To resolve any disputes between the chambers of the court, except the Constitutional Chamber.
- To designate in secret voting, the president and vice-president of the court for periods of four years and two years respectively, and could mean re-elections for equal periods.
- To promulgate an initiative or following a proposal by the Council Superior of the Judicial Power, the internal procedures of order and rebuke what it considers pertinent.
- To annul or revise sentences dictated by the Second and Third Chambers.

The sole exception to the jurisdiction of the Judicial Power exists with the elections, where decisions correspond exclusively to the Tribunal Supremo de Elecciones, according to Article 103 of the constitution.

== See also ==
- List of presidents of the Supreme Court of Costa Rica
- Judicial Investigation Department
- Public Prosecutor of Costa Rica
- Supreme Court of Justice hostage crisis

== Bibliography ==
- Educación Cívica XII. Ediciones Magisterio, Costa Rica. 2005.
- Instituciones de Derecho Público Costarricense. EUNED, Costa Rica. 2005. VI Edición.
- Costa Rica: su historia, tierra y gentes. Tomos I y II. Grupo Océano, España. 1987.
- Constitución Política de Costa Rica. Editec Editores, Costa Rica. 2008.
- Cartilla Histórica de Costa Rica. EUNED, Costa Rica. 2005.
- Historia del Derecho Costarricense. EUNED, Costa Rica. 2007. III Edición.
