= Floria Pinto =

Costa Rican artist

Floria Pinto González de Herrero (September 18, 1923 – 2012) was a Costa Rican artist known for her paintings, prints, and sculpture. A member of the avant-garde Grupo Taller in the 1960s, she later returned to more classical, figurative works in the 1990s.

== Biography ==
Floria Pinto was born in 1923 in San José, Costa Rica.

Beginning in the 1950s, she studied for four years at the University of Costa Rica's School of Fine Arts. She trained under Margarita Bertheau and Francisco Amighetti, among others. Later, in 1974, she studied sculpture with Francisco Zúñiga in Mexico.

Her work—paintings, drawings, sculptures, prints—shifted between figurative and abstract, though her figurative work is better known. She often explored the female figure, and she produced a significant number of intimate self-portraits. In the 1970s, she frequently participated in the country's Sculpture Salons.

Pinto was a part of the Grupo Taller, a group of avant-garde artists in Costa Rica starting in 1963, led by Manuel de la Cruz González. Her later work, in the 1990s, turned back toward classical styles and away from the expressionism that marked her previous output, thanks in part to the influence of her mentor Alberto Ycaza.

Throughout her life, Pinto's work was exhibited in various exhibitions in Costa Rica and abroad, including solo shows at the Costa Rican Museum of Art in 1971 and 1978. Her work is held in international collections in Europe, the United States, and elsewhere. In the 1970s, her painting Christ appeared on a Costa Rican 1 colón stamp.

Pinto died in 2012 in San José In 2025, a posthumous retrospective of her work, "Floria Pinto: Aproximaciones," was staged at the Costa Rican Museum of Art.
