= Victoria Garrón de Doryan =

Costa Rican educator and writer (1920–2005)

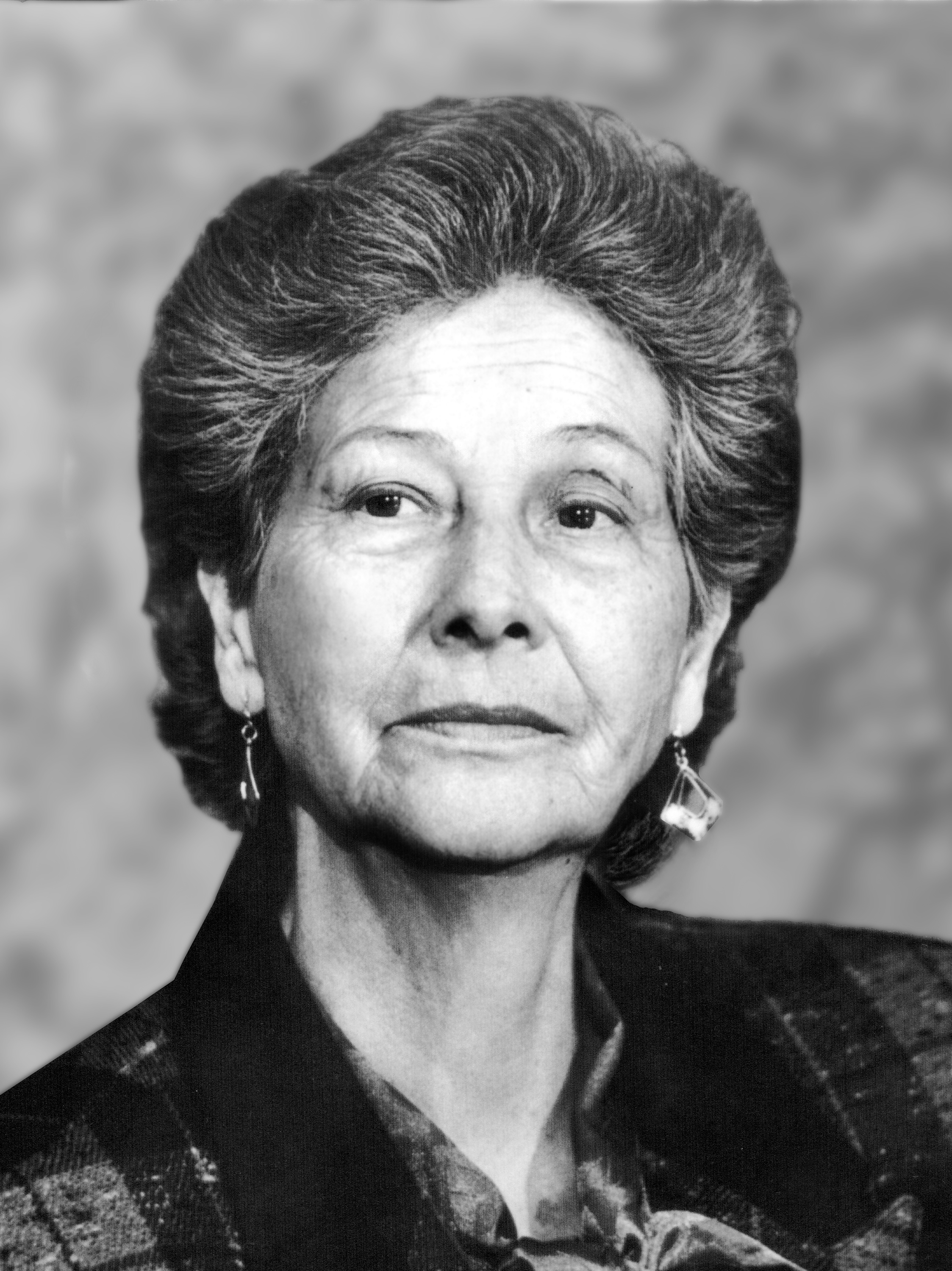

Second Vice President of Costa Rica
- In office 8 May 1986 – 8 May 1990
- President: Óscar Arias Sánchez
- Preceded by: Armando Aráuz Aguilar
- Succeeded by: Arnoldo López Echandi

Personal details
- Born: Victoria María Garrón Orozco; 8 October 1920 San José, Costa Rica
- Died: 30 July 2005 (aged 84) San José, Costa Rica
- Party: PLN
- Spouse: Eduardo Doryan (m. 1951)
- Education: University of Costa Rica (BA)
- Occupation: Educator; politician; writer

Victoria María Garrón Orozco (8 October 1920 – 30 July 2005) was a Costa Rican educator, writer and politician who served as Second Vice President of Costa Rica from 1986 to 1990. A member of the National Liberation Party, she was the first woman to hold the post and during her tenure was acting president of the country over a dozen times. As a writer, she produced numerous biographies of historical Costa Ricans, as well as poetry.

== Early life ==
Victoria María Garrón Orozco was born on 8 October 1920 in San José, Costa Rica to Claudia Orozco Casorla and Estanislao Garrón Lermitte. Her grandfather, François Garrón Lafont, was a pioneer in soap manufacture in Costa Rica. Her father's family were originally from France and she was encouraged to study European humanism and developed a passion for art and culture. She completed her primary education at Escuela Julia Lang and then graduated from secondary school at the Colegio Superior de Señoritas. Studying to be a teacher, she attended normal school, before completing a degree in literature and philosophy from the University of Costa Rica in 1937. Winning a scholarship to study abroad, she went to Paris and completed post-graduate work at the Central American Advanced School of Public Administration (Spanish: Escuela Superior de Administración Pública para la América Central (ESAPAC)) in social pediatrics.

== Career ==
Returning to Costa Rica, Garrón began working as a teacher in secondary education, teaching at the Normal School of Heredia and the Anastasio Alfaro Lyceum and the Colegio Superior de Señoritas, both in San José. She worked with Emma Gamboa Alvarado to develop pedagogy in the country. She became the principal of the Anastasio Alfaro Lyceum and later joined the faculty of the University of Costa Rica, as president of the Graduate College of Letters and Philosophy. Garrón was a member of the Costa Rican Association of University Women, serving in numerous positions on the board and eventually serving as president of the organization. In 1949, she returned to France as a UNESCO fellow and became the Permanent Secretary of the Costa Rican Cooperative Commission for the organization. Garrón married Edward Doryan, and in 1951, the couple had their only child Eduardo.

In 1986, Garrón was elected to serve as the Second Vice President of Costa Rica under Óscar Arias Sánchez. Since 1949, the Costa Rican Constitution has provided that the Executive consist of an elected president and two vice presidents, as well as nineteen appointed cabinet members. Garrón was the first woman elected to the vice presidency and during her tenure to 1990 served as acting president fourteen times.

Garrón wrote poetry and one novel, but she was most known for her biographies of historic personalities of Costa Rica. She published a biography of Joaquín García Monge in 1971, Anastasio Alfaro in 1974, José María Zeledón "Brillo" in 1978, María Teresa Obregón Zamora in 1985, and in 2003 published a biography on her grandfather François Garrón, with the title La canción de la vida (Song of Life).

== Death and legacy ==
Garrón died on 30 July 2005 at the Blanco Cervantes Hospital in San José, Costa Rica. She was buried in the Cemetery of Santo Domingo in Heredia. She is remembered as the first woman in either Central America or North America to hold the post of second vice president of a nation.
