= Eduardo Doryan =

Costa Rican politician (born 1951)

Eduardo Doryan Garrón

Personal details
- Born: 30 October 1951 (age 73); San José, Costa Rica
- Political party: National Liberation Party (PLN)

Eduardo Augusto Doryan Garrón (born 30 October 1951) was Executive President of the Costa Rican Electricity Institute (ICE) for the period 2010–2011. Until April 2010 he was the Executive Presidente of the Caja Costarricense de Seguro Social (CCSS, Costa Rican Social Security Fund). He assumed the role in May 2006, following the second election of president Oscar Arias. He has also previously served as Minister of Education (1994-1998) and Vice-Minister of Science and Technology (1986-1990), all under National Liberation Party governments. Doryan has also had a long and diverse career in academic, public service, consulting and with international organizations.

== Early life ==
Born in San José, Costa Rica, to Dr. Edward Doryan and future Vice-president Victoria Garrón (1986–1990), he graduated from Colegio Saint Francis before attending University of Costa Rica and receiving a B.Sc. in Electrical Engineering. He went on to attend the Graduate Program on Power Systems Engineering at the University of Strathclyde in Scotland. From Harvard University he received a Master in Public Administration from the John F. Kennedy School of Government, and a PhD in Political Economy and Government from the Graduate School of Arts and Science.

== Public service in Costa Rica ==
Doryan served as Costa Rica's Deputy Minister for Science and Technology from 1986 to 1990, during which time he promoted a substantial increase in the number of students pursuing masters and doctoral-level studies in leading North American and European universities. He also played an active role in the efforts to upgrade levels of science and technological research, laboratory facilities, and strengthening the linkages between academia and private companies.

Afterwards, he became Minister of Education from 1994 to 1998 during José María Figueres' presidency. During that time, among some of the important initiatives implemented were those to establish technical education programs to upgrade the skills of the country's workforce, widespread use of computers in primary and secondary schools, the extension of the school year, and the introduction of more challenging curricula to the classroom. He was part of the team at the highest level of the Government that led the attraction of a new wave of foreign direct investment with a higher technological content.

After six years abroad, he became Executive President of the CCSS from 2006 to 2010. The CCSS is a public social sector agency—the largest public or private entity of the country, which is responsible for both the national health insurance and the national retirement/pension insurance; two central pillars of the social protection network that cover the majority of the inhabitants of the country. Following the election of Laura Chinchilla he was appointed to the Costa Rican Electricity Institute, which until recently also had a state monopoly over telecommunications in the country.

== International career ==
Doryan served from 1999 to 2001 as vice president for Human Development at the World Bank where he was responsible for overseeing the Bank's operations in education, health, nutrition, population and social protection (pensions, unemployment and other social assistance). During that time, he was an active member of The Commission on Macroeconomics and Health sponsored by the World Health Organization.

At that same rank within the World Bank's hierarchy, he assumed from 2001 to 2005 the position of Special Representative to the United Nations. Doryan was charged with advancing the new agenda of the World Bank at the time of building common ground with the United Nations and other key partners to advance the global development agenda. He was involved in the Bank's engagement in the United Nations Conference on Financing for Development that took place in Monterrey, Mexico in March 2002, in the World Summit on Sustainable Development held in Johannesburg, South Africa in August 2002 and in the first part of World Summit on the Information Society held in Geneva in December 2003.

He was also active in following-up the Millennium Development Goals and their implications for the way the Bank and the United Nations partners to do their business both at the global and national levels. Doryan also had oversight responsibility of the broad policy relationship between the Bank and the intergovernmental processes at the United Nations, including the Economic and Social Council, the General Assembly and the Security Council, as well as with the United Nations agencies, programs and funds. He followed closely the process leading to the 2005 World Summit.

== Other roles ==
He was a tenured full professor at the University of Costa Rica and later on he also taught at INCAE (Instituto Centroamericano de Administración de Empresas), a leading graduate business school in Latin America with activities in more than a dozen countries.

As head of various major projects while at INCAE he gave advice at the highest levels of government on economic, social and institutional reforms in Central and South America, at different times he was consultant to the Organization of American States, the United Nations Development Program, and the United Nations Industrial Development Organization. He was also the Director of the Latin American Center for Competitiveness and Sustainable Development at INCAE. In that capacity, he provided intellectual and managerial oversight to a team of professionals collaborating with the Central American presidents to develop and implement a strategic framework for competitiveness and sustainable development in the region.

As a private consultant he participated in numerous exercises of strategic planning and organizational reform of medium and large firms, and small and large cooperatives. He has also been in his different capacities a speaker in Asia, North America, Latin America, the Caribbean, Europe and Africa on issues related to global reform, knowledge society, economic and social policy, strategic planning and organizational reform, and health and education-related issues.

== Personal life ==
Doryan lives in San José, Costa Rica. He is married to Dra. Carla Victoria Jara and has two children.
