= Lola Fernández =

Costa Rican teacher and abstract painter

- Born: 15 November 1926 (age 99); Cartagena, Colombia
- Known for: abstract paintings

Lola Fernández (born 15 November 1926) in Colombia is a leading Costa Rican teacher and abstract painter.

== Life ==
Fernández was born in Cartagena, Colombia in 1926 but she moved with her family to Costa Rica whilst still a child. This was where she began her artistic training at the Escuela de Artes Plásticas (University of Costa Rica) in 1941. Francisco Amighetti was one of the artists she studied under. She then studied abroad, first at Escuela Nacional de Bellas Artes in Colombia starting in 1950. In 1954 she went to Italy where she studied at the Accademia di Belle Arti until 1958. She had travelled also to Morocco, and the Middle East during the course and afterwards she went to Asia funded by UNESCO. During that time her travelling included Japan, India and China.

She became a professor at the University of Costa Rica. Her students included Virginia Pérez-Ratton. In 1980 her painting of a volcano was used on a Costa Rican stamp. She was given the Magón National Prize for Culture in 1995.

She was in the first wave of Costa Rican women artists that included Margarita Bertheau, Dinorah Bolandi and Sonia Romero. These four who all taught fine art at the University of Costa Rica are said to have created the second generation of Costa Rican women artists.
