= Sistema de Información de la Población Objetivo =

The Sistema de Información de la Población Objetivo (SIPO) is a social registry used by the Joint Social Welfare Institute of Costa Rica to classify the population of Costa Rica as to levels of poverty and extreme poverty. It seeks to ensure that institutional resources effectively reach the most vulnerable groups of Costa Rican society.

The registry works as an information tool for communities to develop projects, and, more importantly, enables government institutions to use it to implement programs to benefit target populations. Information in the registry is obtained from the Social Information Sheet (FIS), which contains a set of variables, grouped into 10 sections.
