= Medaglia =

Medaglia is an Italian surname. Notable people with the surname include:

- Eros Medaglia (born 1994), Argentine footballer
- Jorge Cabrera Medaglia, Costa Rican jurist
- Júlio Medaglia (born 1938), Brazilian musician
- Diamante Medaglia Faini (1724–1770), Italian poet

== See also ==
- Medaglia d'Oro (horse)
