= Sebnem Kalemli-Ozcan =

Economist

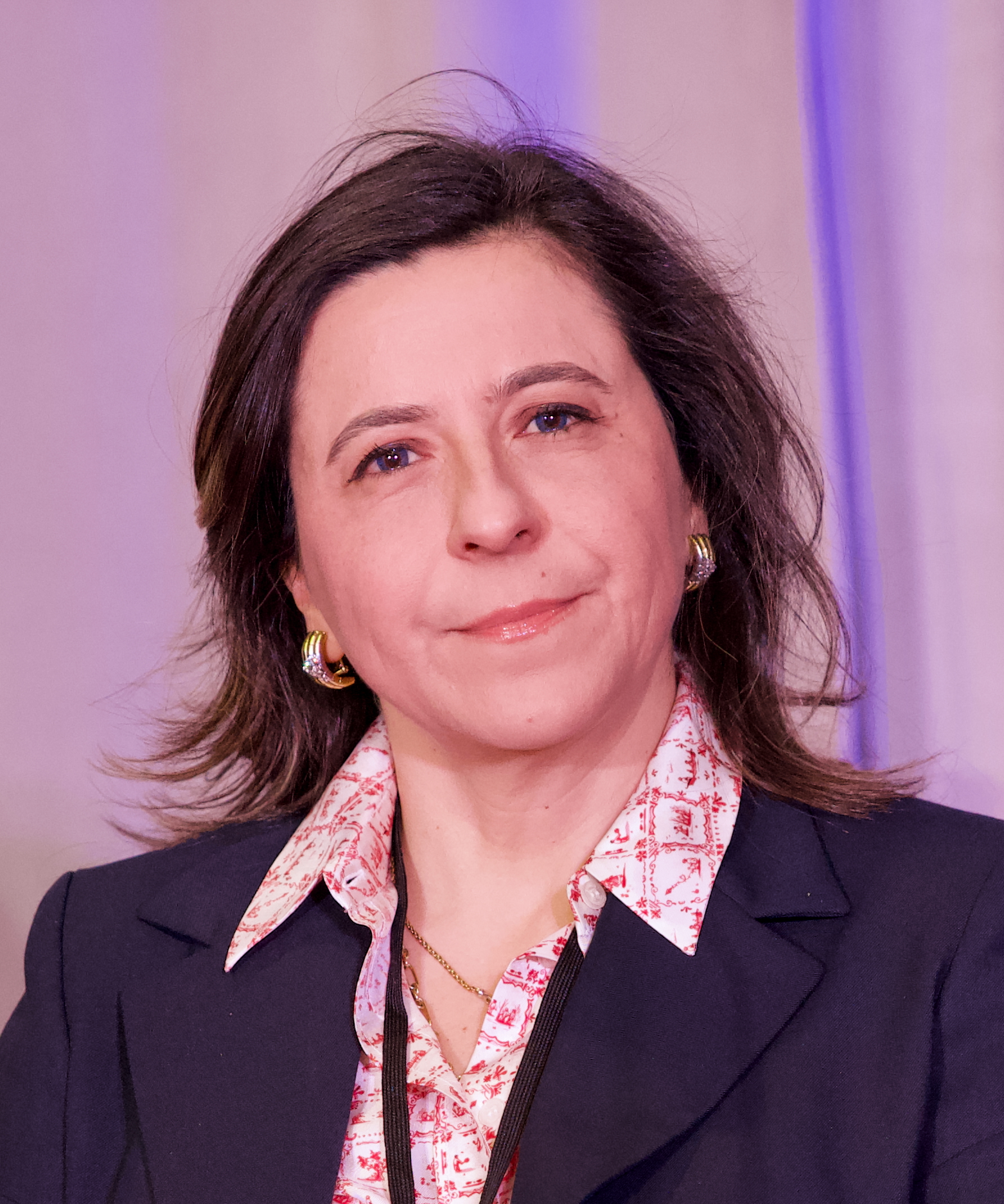
- Kalemli-Özcan at ASSA 2026
- Born: 1974 (age 51–52); Turkey
- Citizenship: Turkey; United States
- Education: Middle East Technical University (BS); Brown University (MA, PhD)
- Children: 2
- Parent: Mustafa Kalemli
- Scientific career
- Fields: International finance, international development
- Workplaces: Brown University; University of Maryland, College Park; University of Houston
- Website: http://econweb.umd.edu/~kalemli/

Ṣebnem Kalemli-Özcan is an economist and the Schreiber Family Professor of Economics at Brown University. She is a co-editor of the Journal of International Economics, on the board of editors of the American Economic Review, an associate editor of the Journal of the European Economic Association and an associate editor of the Journal of Development Economics. She is a research fellow at the NBER and CEPR.

== Education and career ==
She obtained a bachelor's degree from Middle East Technical University and her MA and PhD from Brown University. In 2007-08, she was a Wim Duisenberg Fellow at the European Central Bank. From 2010 to 2011, she was an advisor to the World Bank as Lead Economist for the Middle East and North Africa Region. In 2015, she became the Neil Moskowitz Professor of Economics and Finance at the University of Maryland.

== Research ==
Her research focuses on international finance, economic growth and development economics. Her works have been cited 12900 times. She studies foreign direct investment (FDI) and has given evidence on why capital flow do not go from developed to developing economies. In a 2008 paper with Laura Alfaro and Vadym Volosovych, she found that the quality of institutions were one of the main reasons. Her research has been featured in The New York Times, The Economist, Reuters, NPR, Bloomberg, and the Washington Post.

=== Selected works ===
- Alfaro, Laura, Areendam Chanda, Sebnem Kalemli-Ozcan, and Selin Sayek. "FDI and economic growth: the role of local financial markets." Journal of international economics 64, no. 1 (2004): 89–112.
- Alfaro, Laura, Sebnem Kalemli-Ozcan, and Vadym Volosovych. "Why doesn't capital flow from rich to poor countries? An empirical investigation." The review of economics and statistics 90, no. 2 (2008): 347–368.
- Kalemli-Ozcan, Sebnem, Bent E. Sørensen, and Oved Yosha. "Risk sharing and industrial specialization: Regional and international evidence." American Economic Review 93, no. 3 (2003): 903–918.
- Kalemli-Ozcan, Sebnem, Harl E. Ryder, and David N. Weil. "Mortality decline, human capital investment, and economic growth." Journal of development economics 62, no. 1 (2000): 1-23.
- Alfaro, Laura, Areendam Chanda, Sebnem Kalemli-Ozcan, and Selin Sayek. "Does foreign direct investment promote growth? Exploring the role of financial markets on linkages." Journal of Development Economics 91, no. 2 (2010): 242–256.

== Awards and recognition ==
In 1999, she was nominated Best Young Economist by the Central Bank of the Republic of Turkey. In 2008, she won a Marie Curie International Reintegration Grant. In 2017–18, she was Houblon Norman Fellow at the Bank of England. She is one of the 50 most cited women in economics according to IDEAS.
