= Himno Nacional =

Himno Nacional means National Anthem in Spanish. It may refer to:

- Himno Nacional Argentino
- Himno Nacional de Bolivia
- Himno Nacional de Chile
- Himno Nacional de Costa Rica
- Himno Nacional de El Salvador
- Himno Nacional de Guatemala
- Himno Nacional de Honduras
- Himno Nacional de la República de Colombia
- Himno nacional de Panamá
- Himno Nacional del Perú
- Himno Nacional de Uruguay
- Himno Nacional Dominicano
- Himno Nacional Mexicano
- Himno Nacional de Venezuela

== See also ==
- National anthem
