= Laura Alfaro =

Costa Rican politician and economist

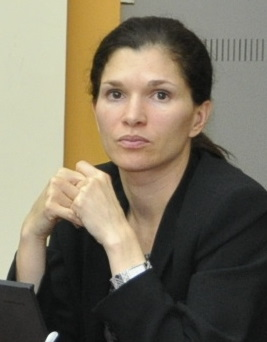
Laura Alfaro

Laura Alfaro is chief economist and economic counselor at the Inter-American Development Bank (IDB), a leading source of financing and knowledge for the economic, social, and institutional development of Latin America and the Caribbean.

She was previously the Warren Alpert Professor of Business Administration at Harvard Business School.

Her specific areas of interest include capital markets, economics, foreign direct investment, globalization, and international finance.

From 2010 to 2012, she served as Minister of National Planning and Economic Policy in the government of President Laura Chinchilla of Costa Rica.

== Career ==
Alfaro holds a PhD in economics from the University of California, Los Angeles and a Bachelor of Arts in economics from the University of Costa Rica.

At Harvard, Alfaro has taught in the General Management Program, the Program for Leadership and Development, and in the MBA and doctoral programs.

Alfaro has published on global markets and finance, supply and demand shocks, and current events.

== Other activities ==
- Kiel Institute for the World Economy, Member of the Scientific Advisory Board

== Recognition ==
Along with being named Warren Alpert Professor of Business Administration in 2013, Alfaro was also the recipient of a 2016 Lemann Brazil Research Fund Award from Harvard University and in 2018 she was the recipient of a Harvard China Fund Faculty Grant.
