= María Luisa Ávila Agüero =

Costa Rican politician (born 1961)

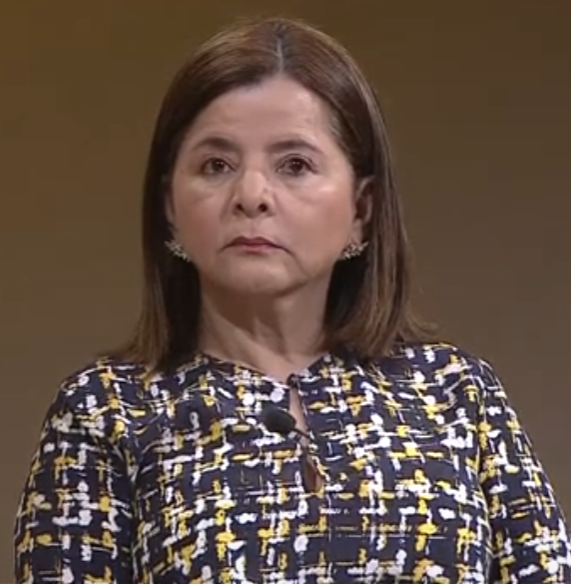

Minister of Public Health
- In office 8 May 2010 – 1 September 2011
- President: Laura Chinchilla Miranda
- Succeeded by: Daisy Corrales

Minister of Public Health
- In office 8 May 2006 – 8 May 2010
- President: Óscar Arias Sánchez
- Preceded by: María del Rocío Sáenz

Personal details
- Born: 30 January 1961 (age 65) San José, Costa Rica
- Party: National Liberation Party
- Education: University of Costa Rica
- Occupation: Pediatric infectious disease specialist
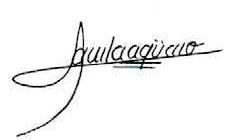
- Signature

María Luisa Ávila Agüero (born 30 January 1961) is a Costa Rican pediatric infectious disease specialist who was Minister of Public Health during the administrations of Óscar Arias Sánchez (2006–2010) and Laura Chinchilla Miranda (2010–2014).

== Biography ==
The daughter of Claudio Ávila Quirós and Evelia Agüero Garro, María Luisa Ávila Agüero studied at the Escuela República de Paraguay and the Colegio Anastasio Alfaro. She graduated as a pediatrician from the University of Costa Rica and specialized in infectious disease. She became the Chief of Infectious Disease at the National Children's Hospital. In 2006, President Óscar Arias Sánchez appointed her Minister of Public Health, and in the following administration, Laura Chinchilla Miranda retained her in the post. She was a member of the research committee at the University of Texas Southwestern Medical Center in Dallas from 1998 to 2002.

== Arias Sánchez administration ==
Through the publication of Executive Decree No. 34510-S "Organic Regulation of the Ministry of Health", a new institutional structure and development of the organizational model was implemented.

In July 2008, through the Executive Decree, the Costa Rica Solid Waste Plan was made official. In 2009, the country achieved the lowest infant mortality rate in its history, ranking third in Latin America, behind only Chile and Cuba.

The basic vaccination scheme for the entire population was extended, through the incorporation of four new vaccines for children: chickenpox, pneumococcus, pertussis, and rotavirus. In April 2010, Law 8809 was passed, creating the National Directorate of CEN-CINAI and providing it with an organizational and managerial structure, as well as resources to be able to advance the coverage of comprehensive care for the country's children.

Ávila resumed the program of vector-borne disease control, giving special emphasis to the fight against malaria, which had been abandoned by previous administrations and left in the hands of local levels of the Ministry of Health. Thanks to Dr. Ávila's management, Matina's Area of Health team was able to obtain support to control the increasing incidence of malaria which had been taking place in that canton of Limón since the early 2000s, and with that, avoid its spread to the rest of the country's low areas.

At the end of the administration in 2010, Costa Rica reported its lowest incidence of dengue fever in nine years, and mortality from hemorrhagic dengue remained at 0.

At the end of July 2009, at the Ministry's request, the Catholic Church canceled the pilgrimage of the faithful to the city of Cartago for the August 2 festival at the Basilica of Our Lady of the Angels, due to the H1N1 flu pandemic.

In February 2010, the Ministry's audit questioned a series of agreements and contracts that it had made with the University of Costa Rica (UCR) to implement an organizational development process at the institution, for a sum of close to 900 million colones (approximately US$1.5 million).

On 20 March 2010, Ávila was part of a group of five ministers – together with Leonardo Garnier (Education), Roberto Gallardo (Planning), Marco Vinicio Ruiz (Foreign Trade), and María Elena Carballo – to ask President Arias Sánchez to promote Bill 16.390 on "civil unions between people of the same sex".

== Chinchilla Miranda administration ==
At the beginning of the Chinchilla Miranda administration, due to a lack of foresight and administrative problems at the Ministry of Public Health, a total of 135,000 children and mothers in poverty did not receive milk normally provided by the government. This caused Ávila to be called to appear before the Legislative Assembly, where some confrontations took place.

In June 2010, members of the PAC and PUSC filed a motion of censure against the Minister of Public Health for friction created after she ordered the closure of 40 offices in the Legislative Assembly's facilities that did not meet appropriate conditions.

María Luisa Ávila presented her resignation from the Ministry of Public Health in July 2011 for differences with President Laura Chinchilla on the intervention process to seek solutions to various problems in the Department of Social Security. The resignation became effective on September 1.

== See also ==
- Politics of Costa Rica
