= National anthem of Costa Rica =

Himno Nacional de Costa Rica
English: Costa Rican National Anthem
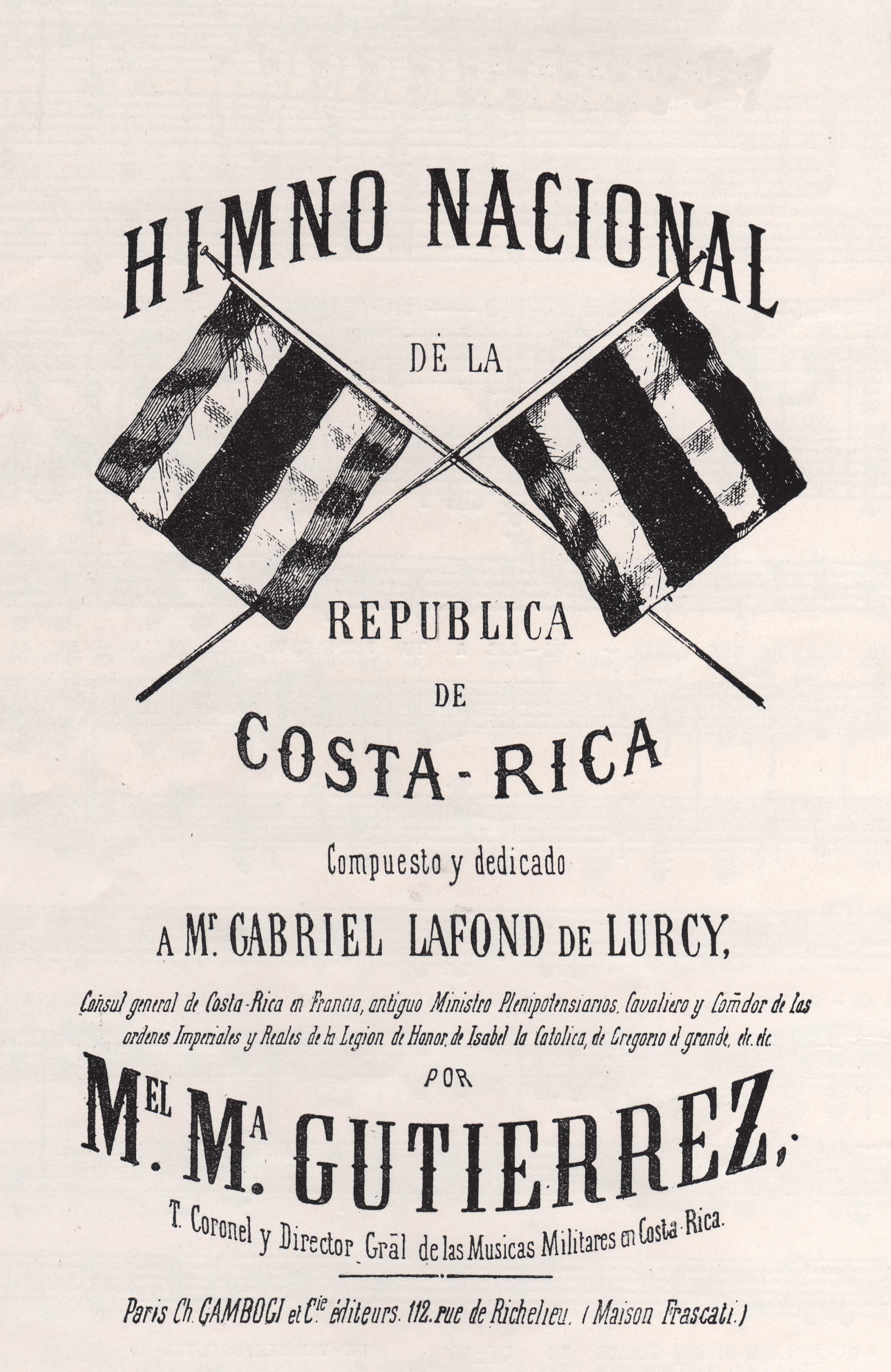
- Cover of the first edition of the national anthem, 1864
- National anthem of Costa Rica
- Also known as: Noble patria, tu hermosa bandera (English: Noble fatherland, your beautiful flag)
- Lyrics: José María Zeledón Brenes, 1903
- Music: Manuel María Gutiérrez Flores
- Adopted: 1852

Audio sample
- U.S. Navy Band instrumental version: file; help

The National Anthem of the Republic of Costa Rica (Spanish: Himno Nacional de la República de Costa Rica), also known by its incipit as "Noble patria, tu hermosa bandera" ("Noble Fatherland, Your Beautiful Flag"), was first adopted in 1852. Its music was composed by Manuel María Gutiérrez Flores, who dedicated the score to French adventurer Gabriel-Pierre Lafond de Lurcy. The music was created to receive delegates from the United Kingdom and the United States that year for the Webster-Crampton Treaty. It was the first Central American national anthem.

The anthem has had several lyrics; the current lyrics were written for a contest held in 1903 by the government of Ascensión Esquivel Ibarra to give the anthem lyrics that reflected the idea of being Costa Rican. The contest was won by José María Zeledón Brenes.

The anthem's lyrics were made official in 1949 by the Founding Junta of the Second Republic, led by José Figueres Ferrer. The music was made official in 1979, under President Rodrigo Carazo Odio.

== History ==
From the period of independence within the First Mexican Empire from 1821 to the beginning of the First Costa Rican Republic in 1848, Costa Rica did not have a national anthem. After the establishment of the republic, Costa Rica began to gain more recognition from other nations. In 1852, then president, Juan Rafael Mora Porras, learnt of the arrival of diplomatic representatives from the United Kingdom and United States in order to establish embassies.

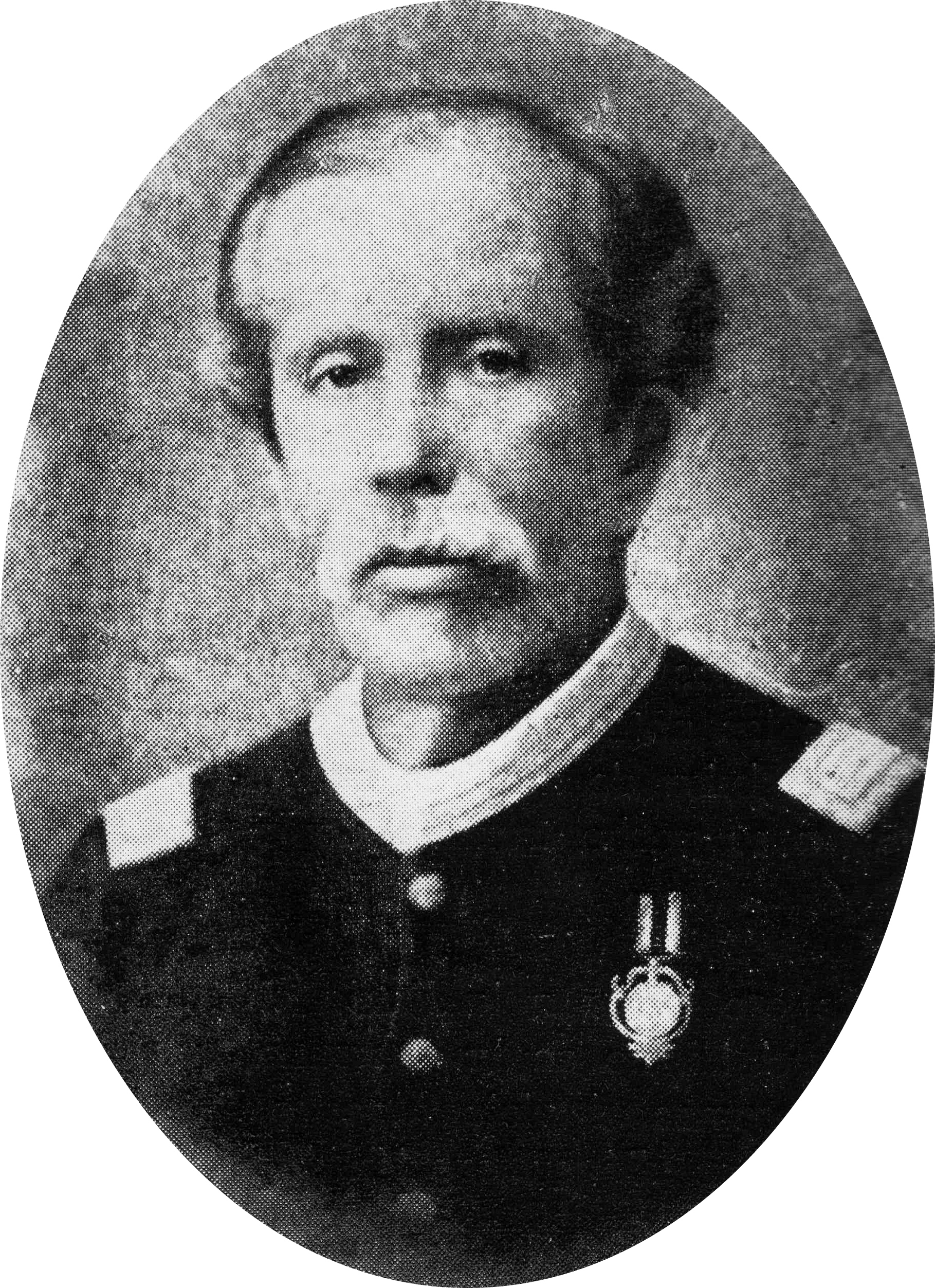
Composer of the national anthem, Captain Manuel María Gutiérrez Flores (1829–1887)

Musician and Director of the Costa Rican Military Band, Manuel María Gutiérrez, then 22 years old, was asked to compose an anthem. Professing a lack of experience and little time, Gutiérrez asked for help from French adventurer Gabriel-Pierre Lafond de Lurcy, who instructed and encouraged him. After consulting Lafond, Gutiérrez composed the anthem in three or four days in his home in central San José. An apocryphal story circulates that Gutiérrez had to compose the music for the anthem while locked in a prison cell for refusing the order the president gave him to compose the anthem, and that he composed the anthem in 24 hours.

The anthem was played in public for the first time by the Banda de San José (San José Band) at the welcome receptions for the delegations from the United Kingdom and United States on 11 June 1852 at the Casa de Gobierno (Government House). The event was held in the Main Barracks, where the Raventós Theatre was later situated, today the Melico Salazar Theatre.

The anthem was largely forgotten after this, so much so that lyrics for it were not made official until 1949, after the civil war and the founding of the Second Republic, and the music was not made official until 1 September 1979, with decree 10471-E, during the presidency of Rodrigo Carazo Odio. The decree was intended to coincide with Gutiérrez's birthday (which is now known to be 3 September).

== Lyrics ==
There was no intention to add lyrics at the time of the anthem's creation, as it was urgently needed for the welcome ceremonies for the foreign delegations. Some lyrics had been written in 1856 during the Filibuster War, to encourage troops on the battlefield, but they were quickly forgotten.

=== 1873 lyrics ===
The first lyrics of the national anthem were written by a Colombian poet living in Costa Rica, José Manuel Lleras, and premiered in 1873. In the context of looming threats by other states to overthrow then president Tomás Guardia Gutiérrez, as well as a threat of the instrumental anthem becoming forgotten by non–military band members, Lleras wrote long lyrics that included high praise of President Guardia, intended to encourage Costa Ricans in the event of war:

Spanish original

Coro:
¡Ciudadanos! El sol de los libres
ha subido radiante al cenit!
Su esplendor nos infunda el aliento
de vencer por la Patria o morir!

I
Costa Rica rompió las cadenas
que la ataban a extraño poder;
soltó al viento su propria (Note: Also written la propia, a more modern form.) bandera
y el imperio fundó de la ley. (Note: Sometimes written el imperio fundo de la lei..)

Libertad proclamó entusiasmada,
Libertad en el orden y el bien;
del progreso ciñó la guirnalda
¡en su virgen (Note: Sometimes written virjen.) y cándida sien!

Coro

II
La ambición de un oscuro extranjero
someterla al yugo intentó,
indignados se alzaron los pueblos,
y gritaron: «atrás invasor!»

Y de Walker las huestes rabiosas
escucharon templando la voz,
pues sobre ellas, las lides heroicas,
Costa Rica clavó su pendón.

Coro

III
Largos años entonces el cielo
quiso darnos de dicha y de paz
I (sic) a su sombra benigna, el Progreso
la riqueza fundó nacional.

El trabajo constante i (sic) activo
daba al pueblo, munifico, el pan
I (sic) era Guardia, el deber circunscrito,
Del derecho del pueblo, el guardián.

Coro

IV
La codicia de hermanos celosos
agitada en constante inquietud:
no consciente vivamos nosotros
en la paz, el progreso i la luz;

I nos retan a lid fraticida
preparando el traidor arcabuz;
¡vengan, pues, que jamá la injusticia
vencerá nuestra noble actitud!

Coro

V
El cañón que en San Juan i San Jorge
hizo el polvo otro tiempo morder
al intruso bandido del Norte,
su estampido prepara otra vez;

Si el clarín sanguinario resuena,
Costa Rica, con noble altivez,
´guerra, guerra´ dirán sus cornetas,
«¡Ciudadanos, morir o vencer!»

Coro

VI
I del mar i del prado i del bosque,
Del desierto i poblado la voz
La ha escuchado el lejano horizonte
Repitiendo: «¡Jamás! ¡Invasor!»

»Nuestro suelo no huella la planta
de una alianza cobarde feroz,
Mientras brille la chispa sagrada,
en el pueblo, de bélico ardor»

Coro

VII
Mientras Guardia, el soldado aguerrido,
Trace al pueblo del pueblo el deber,
aunque se halle la patria en peligro,
Guardar puede su honor i su fe;

¡Salve oh Guardia, valiente i patriota!
¡Salve, oh Guardia, de heroica altivez!
Salve, oh Guardia, su honor i sus glorias
son de un pueblo de libres, sostén.

Coro

English translation

Chorus:
Citizens, the sun of the free
has risen radiantly to the zenith:
its splendour gives us the breath
to win for the Fatherland or die.

I
Costa Rica broke the chains
that bound her to foreign power;
she let loose her own flag to the wind
and founded the empire of law.

Liberty proclaimed enthusiastically,
Liberty in order and good;
she girded the garland of progress
on her virgin and innocent temple!

Chorus

II
The ambition of a suspicious foreigner
tried to submit her to the yoke,
outraged, the peoples rose up,
and they cried: "Back off, invader!"

And Walker's enraged troops
listened, tempering their voices,
for over them, the heroic battles,
Costa Rica nailed her banner.

Chorus

III
For long years thereupon heaven
wanted to give us happiness and peace
and in its benign shadow, progress
founded national wealth.

Constant and active work
gave the people, generous, bread
and Guardia was, the circumscribed duty,
Of the right of the people, the guardian.

Chorus

IV
The greed of jealous brothers
agitated in constant restlessness:
let us not consciously live
in peace, progress and light;

And they challenge us to a fratricidal fight
preparing the traitorous arquebus;
Come, then, so that injustice never
will overcome our noble attitude!

Chorus

V
The cannon that in San Juan and San Jorge
once made the dust bite
the intruder bandit from the North,
its blast prepares again;

If the bloodthirsty clarion resounds,
Costa Rica, with noble pride,
'War, war' will say its horns,
"Citizens, death or victory!"

Chorus

VI
And from the sea and the meadow and the forest,
From the desert and settlement, the voice
Has been heard by the distant horizon
Repeating: "Never! Invader!"

"Our soil does not mark the plant
of a fierce cowardly alliance,
As long as the holy spark shines,
in the people, of warlike ardour"

Chorus

VII
As long as Guardia, the hardened soldier,
Outlines the duty of the people to the people,
even if the fatherland finds itself in danger,
It can keep its honour and his faith;

Hail oh Guardia, brave and patriotic!
Hail, oh Guardia, of heroic pride!
Hail, oh Guardia, your honour and your glories
Are the sustenance of a free people.

Lleras's lyrics were forgotten after the events regarding President Guardia.

=== 1879 lyrics ===
In 1879, the anthem began to be sung with shorter lyrics written by seminarian Juan Garita y Guillén, which premiered on 24 June that year at the Colegio Seminario (Seminary College). Garita's lyrics were very simplistic:

Spanish original

Cantaré de la patria querida
el honor, libertad y esplendor
Con el alma de júbilo henchida
cantaré de la patria el honor.

En tu faz, sin afán, tus hijos vivirán
siempre unidos gozarán del honor
sin triste desdén animados (Note: Sometimes written animosos.) irán
al glorioso clamor, a la voz de la libertad.

Ceñiré de la Patria la sien inmortal
de laurel y de mirto triunfal.
Tocaré con placer el clarín del afán,
honor cantaré a tu gloria y valor.

English translation

I will sing of the dear fatherland
the honour, liberty and splendour
with the soul filled with jubilation
I will sing the honour of the fatherland.

In your face, without hardship, your children will live
always together, they will enjoy honour
without sad disdain, animated they will go
to the clamour of honour, to the voice of freedom.

I will gird the immortal temple of the Fatherland
of laurel and triumphal myrtle.
I will play the clarion of eagerness with pleasure,
honour I will sing to your glory and courage.

Like Lleras's lyrics, Garita's lyrics also stopped being sung. The Lleras and Garita lyrics were never officially adopted.

=== 1888 lyrics ===
In 1888, Spanish pedagogue Juan Fernández Ferraz wrote a poetic third set of lyrics for the national anthem, which were longer than the previous lyrics. After being distributed in schools and colleges, they were sung for longer and were made official:

Spanish original

Coro:
De la patria el amor nos inspira,
elevémosle un himno triunfal
De Tirteo en la bélica lira
celebremos su gloria inmortal.

I
Nuestra voz acordada resuene viril
desde el Ande gigante a la mar;
y repitan los valles, cual trueno rugiente,
𝄆 las bélicas notas del patrio cantar. 𝄇

Desde el bosque sombrío al florido pensil,
cunda el eco potente, sublime, ferviente
y al ara bendita, holocausto de amor,
las preseas llevemos de gloria y honor.

Coro

II
Nuestro hogar defendamos sin miedo a la lid
que el laurel nos espera al vencer;
y si acaso tendidos a tierra caemos,
𝄆 espléndida gloria nos da el perecer. 𝄇

Sobre el campo tendido a la patria decid,
que del bueno el cadáver jamás dejaremos,
y al suelo confiando su cuerpo mortal,
cantaremos al héroe el himno triunfal.

Coro

III
Nuestros bosques frondosos aliento nos dan,
Con su dulce fragancia sutil;
Y del valle la verde llanura florida,
𝄆 Enérgico impulso de ardor juvenil. 𝄇

De la patria querida las glorias serán
luz inmensa y calor que sustenta la vida,
y en ella al rendir en suspiro postrer,
miraremos la muerte con hondo placer.

Coro

IV
Gloria, honor a la patria que amante nos dio
Cuanto es grato a la vida mortal:
gloria, honor a la tierra y bendita y hermosa,
𝄆 que a altísima gloria aspira ideal 𝄇

Si su nombre sin mancha doquiera brilló,
cual estrella radiante de lumbre preciosa;
por ella juremos cual bravos reñur;
sí, juremos por ella vencer o morir.

Coro

English translation

Chorus:
The love of the fatherland inspires us.
Let us raise it a triumphal hymn
on the warlike lyre of Tyrtaeus.
Let us celebrate its immortal glory.

I
Our accordant voice resounds virile
from the giant Andes to the sea;
and the valleys repeat, like roaring thunder,
the singing of the warlike notes of the fatherland.

From the shady forest to the flowery garden,
spreads the powerful, sublime, fervent echo
and to the blessed altar, a burnt offering of love,
we carry the medals of glory and honour.

Chorus

II
Let us defend our home without fear of battle
since the laurel awaits us when we win;
and if we may fall lying on the ground,
death gives us splendid glory.

Over the extensive countryside, say to the homeland,
that we will never leave the corpse of the good,
and to the ground, entrusting his mortal body,
we will sing the triumphal hymn to the hero.

Chorus

III
Our lush forests give us breath,
With their sweet, subtle fragrance;
And from the valley, the green flowery plain,
An energetic impulse of youthful ardour.

From the dear fatherland, the glories will be
an immense light and warmth that sustains life,
and in it, when taking our last breath,
we will look at death with deep pleasure.

Chorus

IV
Glory, honour to the fatherland that, beloved, gave us
All that is gratifying to mortal life:
glory, honour to the earth, blessed and beautiful,
that aspires an ideal to the highest glory

If its spotless name shone everywhere,
like a radiant star of precious brilliance;
for it we swear like brave fighters;
yes, we swear to win or die for it.

Chorus

=== Current lyrics ===
Although Fernández Ferraz's composition had literary merit, its language was somewhat too elevated to take root in the people, in addition to not adapting well to the music of the anthem, and adjustments had to be made to the original score by maestro Gutiérrez. All of this led to a decision to replace Fernández Ferraz's lyrics with new lyrics, for which a public contest was held in 1903. The contest was won by a composition by José María Zeledón Brenes, presented under the pseudonym "El Labrador". Zeledón Brenes was declared the winner on 24 August, and his lyrics were first sung publicly on 15 September.

Zeledón Brenes's lyrics, with minor changes, are the current lyrics of the national anthem of Costa Rica. They were officially adopted on 10 June 1949 by the Founding Junta of the Second Republic with decree number 551:

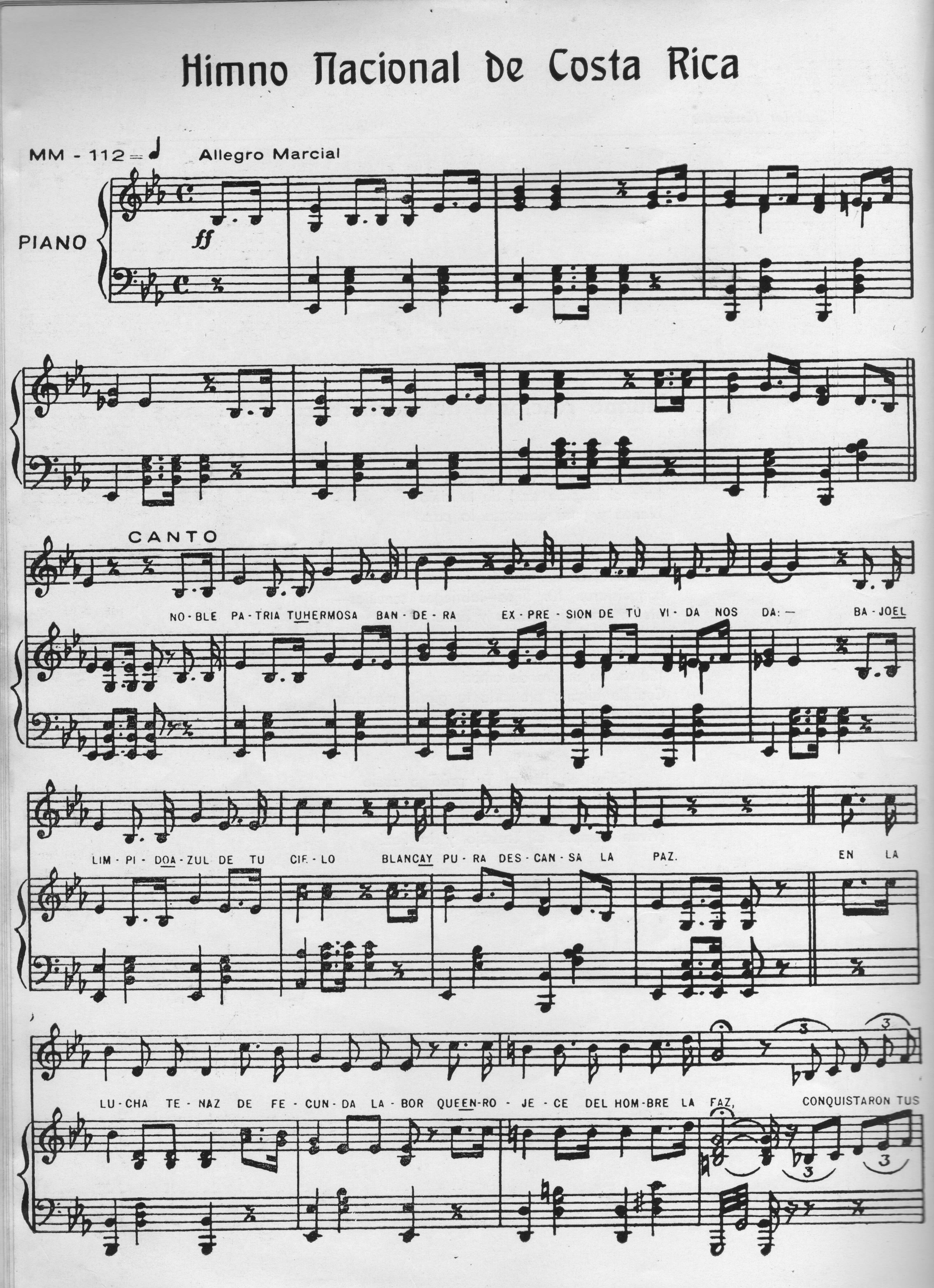
Sheet music of the anthem with the lyrics adopted in 1949

Spanish original

¡Noble patria!, tu hermosa bandera
expresión de tu vida nos da;
bajo el límpido azul de tu cielo
blanca y pura descansa la paz.

En la lucha tenaz, de fecunda labor,
que enrojece del hombre la faz;
conquistaron tus hijos, labriegos sencillos,
𝄆 eterno prestigio, estima y honor. 𝄇

¡Salve, oh tierra gentil!
¡Salve, oh madre de amor!
Cuando alguno pretenda tu gloria manchar,
verás a tu pueblo, valiente y viril,
la tosca herramienta en arma trocar.

¡Salve, oh patria!, tu pródigo suelo
dulce abrigo y sustento nos da;
bajo el límpido azul de tu cielo,
¡vivan siempre el trabajo y la paz!

English translation

Noble fatherland! Your beautiful flag
shows us the expression of your life;
under the limpid blue of your sky,
white and pure, rests peace.

In the tenacious struggle, of fecund labour,
that reddens the man's face;
your children, simple farmhands, conquered
𝄆 eternal prestige, esteem and honour. 𝄇

Hail, oh gentle land!
Hail, oh mother of love!
When someone intends to tarnish your glory,
you will see your people, brave and virile,
the rustic tool into a weapon transform.

Hail, oh fatherland! Your prodigal soil
gives us sweet warmth and sustenance;
under the limpid blue of your sky,
may work and peace always live!

In Zeledón's original wording, the first stanza read:

Spanish original

Costa Rica tu hermosa bandera
expresión de tu vida nos da;
Bajo el manto azul de tu cielo
blanca y pura descansa la paz.

English translation

Costa Rica, your beautiful flag
gives us expression of your life;
under the blue cloak of your sky,
white and pure, rests peace.

And the last:

Spanish original

¡Salve, oh patria!, tu pródigo suelo
dulce abrigo y sustento nos da;
Bajo el límpido azul de tu cielo,
¡blanca y pura descansa la paz!

English translation

Hail, oh fatherland! Your prodigal soil
gives us sweet shelter and sustenance;
under the limpid blue of your sky,
white and pure, rests peace!
