= José María Zeledón Brenes =

Costa Rican politician and writer, author of the national anthem.(1877–1949)

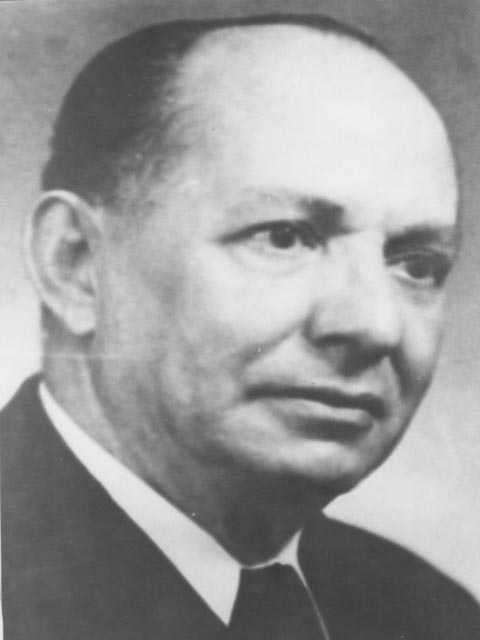
Image of José María Zeledón Brenes

José María Zeledón Brenes (April 26, 1877 – December 6, 1949) was a Costa Rican politician, poet, journalist and writer under the pen name Billo Zeledón. He is known as the author of Costa Rica's national anthem.

== Biography ==
His mother died at childbirth and his father when he was very young; he was raised by two of his aunts, both his father's sisters. His aunts being impoverished, he attended only the first year in the Liceo de Costa Rica, before leaving school to work for a living.

In 1892 he began to work as a court recorder in the Supreme Court of Justice of Costa Rica (Corte Suprema de Justicia), a position that helped him become a journalist. His first articles were published in 1898 in El Diarito (The Little Diary), and from that date until 1948 he was published in all the major newspapers and magazines in Costa Rica.

On December 24, 1899 he married his cousin Ester Venegas Zeledón. They had five children.

When he was 27 years old, he participated in a competition to provide lyrics for the National Anthem, which already had music composed by Manuel María Gutiérrez. He gained the first prize and his lyrics have remained in use since 1903.

He wrote two books for children: Jardin para Niños (Garden For Children) in 1916 and Alma Infantil (Childlike Soul) in 1928. His other books Campo de Batalla (Battlefield) and Germinal were burned before they were published.

He earned his livelihood and his family's by working in accounting for diverse institutions and enterprises. From 1914 to 1917 he was the director of the National Printing press; from 1917 to 1924 he was the administrator of the Botica Francesa (French Drugstore). In 1920 he was chosen to be a Legislator of Congress. From 1924 to 1936 he worked as audit in the Municipalidad de San Jose. In 1925, he worked as chairman of Banco Nacional de Seguros, until 1936. That year he began to work in the Contraloria de Hospitales until 1940, year when he went to live to Puntarenas as Audit of the Compañia Atunera until 1944.

In 1946 he was named General Secretary of Hospital San Juan de Dios, a position he had until 1949. In 1948, during the Costa Rican Civil War he was sent to jail and severely beaten.

In 1949 he supported the creation of the Unidad Nacional party and worked in the Constituent Assembly as a representative of the party. By then his health was very delicate and he could not return to the Assembly, and retired to his property "La Pastora" (The Shepherd) in Esparza. He died there on December 6, 1949 at the age of 72. His funeral took place in San Jose.
