= José María Rico =

Spanish-born Costa Rican lawyer and writer

First Gentleman of Costa Rica
- In role May 8, 2010 – May 8, 2014
- President: Laura Chinchilla
- Preceded by: Leila Rodríguez Stahl; Vacant (2006–2010)
- Succeeded by: Mercedes Peñas Domingo

Personal details
- Born: August 12, 1934 Granada, Andalusia, Spain
- Died: April 15, 2019 (aged 84) San José, Costa Rica
- Spouse: Laura Chinchilla (m. 2000; his death 2019)
- Children: 1
- Education: University of Granada; University of Montreal
- Profession: Lawyer

José María Rico Cueto (August 12, 1934 – April 15, 2019) was a Spanish-born Costa Rican lawyer and writer specializing in criminal law who served as the First Gentleman of Costa Rica during the presidency of his wife, former President Laura Chinchilla, from 2010 to 2014. Rico was the first First Gentleman in Costa Rica's history and has been the only First Gentleman of Costa Rica as of 2023.

== Biography ==
=== Early life and Careers ===
Born in Loja, Granada, Spain, he moved in 1965 to Montreal to pursue his career in international law; Son of José Rico Gaya and Carmen Cueto Narváez, he acquired Canadian nationality and later Costa Rican nationality when he married Laura Chinchilla Miranda. From there he traveled frequently to Latin America and the United States. He was a lawyer and expert in penal code.

In 1990, Rico met his spouse, Laura Chinchilla, while both were working as consultants for the Center for the Administration of Justice at the University of Florida in Miami. The couple had a son, José María Rico Chinchilla, in 1996 and married on March 26, 2000.

=== Legacies ===
He has served as a consultant for the United Nations for Latin America and as an honorary professor in the Department of Criminology at the University of Montreal, Canada. In numerous nations (Canada, Spain, Costa Rica, El Salvador, Guatemala, Panama, the Dominican Republic, and Venezuela), he provided police consultations. He provided consulting services on a range of subjects pertaining to the administration of justice (judicial councils, judicial careers, judicial police, citizen security, police reform, public corruption, and thesaurus on criminology and criminal justice) to a number of international organizations, including the World Bank, IDB, UNDP, ILANUD, and AID.

He has written over 60 articles, over 20 books, and monographs on subjects pertaining to law enforcement, criminal justice administration, and public safety.

=== Death ===
On July 11, 2010, Rico accidentally slipped and fell after watching the 2010 FIFA World Cup Final with Chinchilla at a hotel in Nandayure Canton. He suffered massive fractures in his hipbone, femur, and ribs. The next day he was airlifted to Hospital CIMA where he successfully underwent surgery.

Rico was diagnosed with Alzheimer's disease in 2016. In March 2019, he was hospitalized at the Hospital Metropolitano in San Jose, Costa Rica, as his health rapidly declined. Rico died in the same hospital from complications of Alzheimer's disease on April 15, 2019, at the age of 84.
