= Silvia Lara Povedano =

Costa Rican politician and sociologist

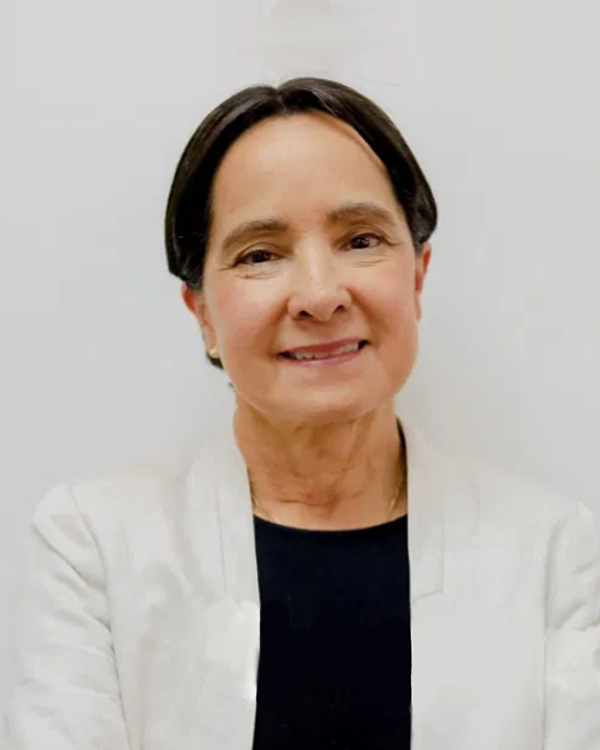
Silvia Lara Povedano (2021)

Silvia Lara Povedano (1959) is a Costa Rican politician and sociologist. She was president of the Joint Social Welfare Institute (Instituto Mixto de Ayuda Social) (IMAS) during the administration of Abel Pacheco (PUSC) and vice-presidential candidate of the National Liberation Party for the 2014 elections as running mate of presidential candidate Johnny Araya Monge.

Lara graduated with a master's degree in sociology from the University of Costa Rica. She was executive director of the Business Association for Development, director of the National Women's Institute (INAMU), consultant for various UN agencies, including UNDP, UNICEF, UNIFEM, and ECLAC between 2003 and 2007, the World Conservation Union and the Instituto Interamericano de Derechos Humanos. She was also the social sector consultant for the Costa Rican government during the Óscar Arias administration.
