= Laura Chinchilla =

President of Costa Rica from 2010 to 2014

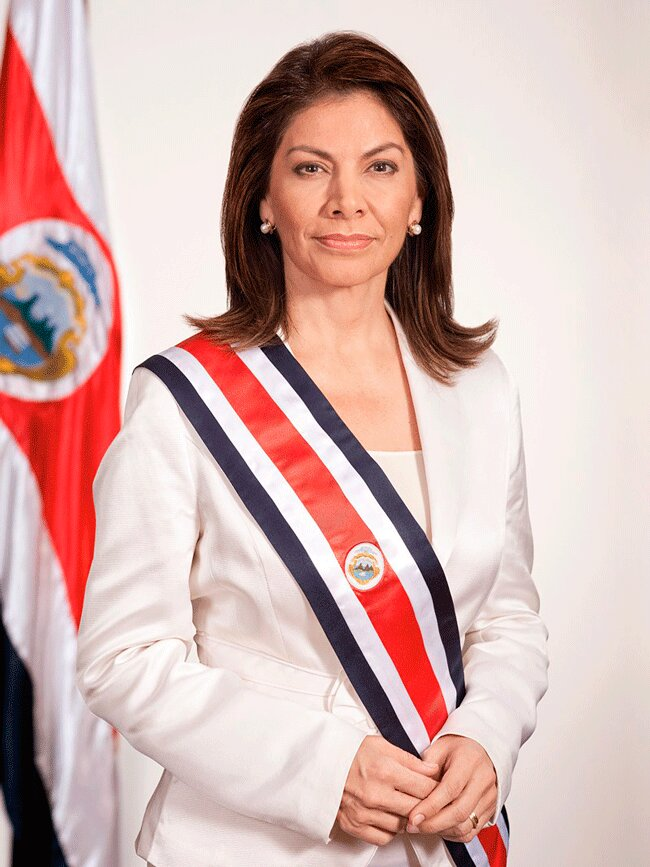
- Official portrait, c. 2010

46th President of Costa Rica
- In office 8 May 2010 – 8 May 2014
- Vice President: First Vice President Alfio Piva; Second Vice President Luis Liberman
- Preceded by: Óscar Arias
- Succeeded by: Luis Guillermo Solís

15th First-Vice President of Costa Rica
- In office 8 May 2006 – 8 October 2008
- President: Óscar Arias
- Preceded by: Lineth Saborío Chaverri
- Succeeded by: Alfio Piva (2010)
Additional offices
President pro tempore of CELAC
In office 28 January 2014 – 8 May 2014
Preceded by	Raúl Castro
Succeeded by	Luis Guillermo Solís
Minister of Justice and Grace
In office 8 May 2006 – 8 October 2008
President	Óscar Arias
Preceded by	Patricia Vega Herrera
Succeeded by	Viviana Martín Salazar
Minister of Public Security
In office 30 March 2008 – 14 April 2008
President	Óscar Arias
Preceded by	Fernando Berrocal Soto
Succeeded by	Janina del Vecchio Ugalde
In office 12 November 1996 – 8 May 1998
President	José María Figueres
Preceded by	Bernardo Arce Gutiérrez
Succeeded by	Juan Rafael Lizano Sáenz
Vice Minister of Public Security
In office 8 May 1994 – 12 November 1996
President	José María Figueres
Succeeded by	Óscar Albán Chipsen

Deputy of the Legislative Assembly
- In office 1 May 2002 – 30 April 2006
- Preceded by: Guido Monge Fernández
- Succeeded by: Evita Arguedas Maklouf
- Constituency: San José (13th Office)

Personal details
- Born: Laura Chinchilla Miranda; 28 March 1959 (age 67) San José, Costa Rica
- Party: National Liberation Party (until 2022); Independent (2022-present)
- Spouses: Mario Alberto Madrigal Díaz (m. 1982; div. 1985); José María Rico (m. 2000; died 2019)
- Children: 1
- Education: University of Costa Rica; Georgetown University
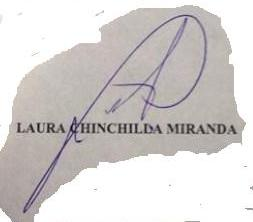
- Signature

Laura Chinchilla Miranda (Spanish: [ˈlawɾa tʃinˈtʃiʝa miˈɾanda]; born 28 March 1959) is a Costa Rican political scientist and politician who served as President of Costa Rica from 2010 to 2014. She was one of Óscar Arias Sánchez's two Vice-Presidents and his administration's Minister of Justice. She was the governing PLN candidate for president in the 2010 general election, where she won with 46.76% of the vote on 7 February. She was the eighth woman president of a Latin American country and the first woman to become President of Costa Rica. She was sworn in as President of Costa Rica on 8 May 2010.

After leaving office, she taught at Georgetown University in 2016. Chinchilla is co-chair of the Inter-American Dialogue, previously served as a Fellow at the Georgetown Institute of Politics and Public Service.

Since January 2026, she has been president of the Club of Madrid, an organization of which she was previously vice president, and since June 2026 she has been co-chair of the South-North Commission on Development alongside former German Chancellor Olaf Scholz

== Early life ==
Laura Chinchilla was born in the Desamparados district of San José, the oldest child of her family with three younger brothers. Her father is Rafael Ángel Chinchilla Fallas, who served as comptroller of Costa Rica from 1972 to 1987, and maintained general popularity among the public. Her mother is Emilce Miranda Castillo. She attended the University of Costa Rica where she obtained a degree in political science, and she then attended Georgetown University in the United States for a master's degree in public policy. She then returned to Costa Rica to work as a policy consultant for security and judicial reform.

Chinchilla married Mario Alberto Madrigal Díaz on 23 January 1982. They divorced on 22 May 1985. Chinchilla met her second husband, José María Rico Cueto, a Spanish lawyer who held Canadian citizenship, in 1990 while both were working as consultants for the Center for the Administration of Justice at the Florida International University in Miami, Florida. The couple had a son, José María Rico Chinchilla, in 1996. Chinchilla married Rico on 26 March 2000. Chinchilla's marital history and the child she had out of wedlock did not significantly affect her political life—despite the country's significant Catholic population—due to a culture in Costa Rican politics of avoiding personal attacks.

Chinchilla became the Vice Minister of Public Security under President José María Figueres. Figueres then appointed her Minister of Public Security, and she became the first woman to hold the position. She was elected to the Legislative Assembly of Costa Rica in 2002. Chinchilla became the First Vice President of Costa Rica in 2006, also taking the position of Minister of Justice and Peace. She held these positions until 2008, when she resigned to run for President of Costa Rica in the 2010 general election.

== 2010 presidential campaign ==
Chinchilla's presidential campaign was unexpected, as she was not a prominent member of her political party, the National Liberation Party, and she had previously given little indication of an interest in the presidency. Commentators have credited President Óscar Arias with mentoring her for the presidency. During her campaign, she benefited from an image that she was an outsider while still representing political continuity from Arias's administration. Chinchilla's opponents accused her of being "a puppet of Arias", with one campaign advertisement depicting her as a marionette in his hands. She and her allies criticized double standards related to her gender, such as an increased focus on her wardrobe and suggestions that she was weaker.

Chinchilla campaigned on the issues of social welfare, economic competitiveness, environmental protection, and domestic security. She used the slogan firme y honesta (firm and honest), suggesting both a strong criminal policy and an anti-corruption platform, both of which were significant priorities for the public. She did not explicitly campaign on women's issues so as not to alienate voters, instead promoting issues that benefited families. Major campaign promises included the construction of 20,000 low-income housing units, a reduction of the unemployment rate from 7.8% to 5.0%, and switching the nation to 95% renewable resources. She also spoke of improving infrastructure, child care, and law enforcement.

In the National Liberation Party's primary election, Chinchilla won with a 15% margin over the runner up, in part due to Arias's endorsement of her candidacy. During the general election, Chinchilla's main opponents were Ottón Solís of the Citizens' Action Party and Otto Guevara of the Libertarian Movement. She won with approximately 47% of the vote, with Solís and Guevara splitting much of the rest between them. Chinchilla had stronger support among women and the elderly. Her personality, her campaign strategy, and her womanhood were all represented as reasons for support in voter surveys. Despite this, Chinchilla did not emphasize her gender during her campaign, instead campaigning on ideas of the traditional family.

== Presidency (2010–2014) ==
=== Political capital ===
Chinchilla took office with the National Liberation Party holding 24 of the Legislative Assembly's 57 seats, giving her party a plurality. It attempted to reelect Luis Gerardo Villanueva as the assembly's president in violation of procedure, resulting in Juan Carlos Mendoza García of the Citizen's Action Party taking the position. Chinchilla had a mixed relationship with the legislature, feuding with both the opposition and with members of her own party. Political researcher Constantino Urcuyo estimated that only 12 members of the legislature were allied with her. One year into her term, Chinchilla rejected Mendoza's proposal to raise congressional pay, causing the coalition government to break down.

Chinchilla did not have a strong political base among her constituents while president, even from voters within her own party. Much of her political capital was contingent on her association with Arias. When she diverged from his policy positions, she lost his backing as well as that of his supporters.

Chinchilla's leadership was challenged in 2011 when Arias's brother, Rodrigo Arias Sánchez, announced his candidacy for president in the 2014 general election. Making such an announcement shortly after Chinchilla took office was seen as a criticism of her leadership. This dispute caused legislators in the National Liberation Party to split into factions, with Arias supporters demanding changes in Chinchilla's administration.

=== Isla Calero ===
In 2010, the military of Nicaragua occupied the uninhabited Isla Calero, a disputed territory between the two nations. Chinchilla responded by writing a criticism of the action in the Miami Herald and seeking adjudication from the International Court of Justice. The court ordered both nations to evacuate the island in March 2011, and her response to the incident is often considered a high point of her presidency.

By mid-2011, President Chinchilla decided to build a 160 kilometer gravel road along the river, as a response to what she and her government saw as a Nicaraguan invasion of Costa Rican territory. The road was officially named “Ruta 1858, Juan Rafael Mora Porras” to honor a Costa Rican hero in a show of national pride.

The road was to stretch more than 150 km. A decree of emergency allowed the government to waive environmental regulations and oversight from the General Comptroller (Contraloria General de la Republica). Neither environmental nor engineering studies were conducted before the road was announced. There were accusations of mismanagement and corruption. The Ministerio Publico (Costa Rican attorney general) announced an official inquiry about the charges of corruption. Francisco Jiménez, minister of public works and transportation, was dismissed by Chinchilla as a consequence of the affair.

=== Public image ===
Chinchilla presented a significant image of "soft or feminine" leadership. This was in part because of her leadership style of collaborating with others. Her supporters saw this as a sign of conciliation, while detractors saw it as an inability to act independently. Her leadership was often contrasted with that of her predecessor, Arias, who maintained a strong, authoritative image and was less open to collaboration.

In 2013, the Mexican opinion poll firm Consulta Mitofsky released a survey that placed Chinchilla as the least popular president in Latin America with a 13% approval rate, just behind Porfirio Lobo of Honduras. At the end of Chinchilla's presidency, Costa Rica had many economic troubles. Public debt had reached 50% of GDP, unemployment was steadily rising and, despite high annual growth, 20% of the population lived below the poverty line. In 2016, Chinchilla was considered one of the most powerful women in Central America according to the World Economic Forum.

=== Cabinet ===
Chinchilla appointed 42 cabinet ministers during her presidency, and she kept several ministers from the Arias presidency. Her selection of ministers emphasized technocratic and academic experience, though the appointment of Minister of Planning Laura Alfaro was seen as a personal gesture. Minister of Public Works and Transportation Francisco Jiménez was relieved from his position due to scandal. Chinchilla elevated the National Institute of Women to cabinet level status.

The following were members of Chinchilla's presidential cabinet. Names marked with an asterisk (*) also held the position during Arias's presidency.

Portfolio	Minister	Took office	Left office
Minister of Agriculture and Livestock	Gloria Abraham Peralta	May 2010	May 2014
Minister of Telecommunications, Energy and Environment	Teófilo de la Torre	May 2010	August 2012
Minister of Telecommunications, Energy and Environment	René Castro	August 2012	May 2014
Minister of Social Well Being and Family	Fernando Marín	May 2012	May 2014
Minister of Culture and Youth	Manuel Obregón	May 2010	May 2014
Minister of Decentralization & Local Governments	Juan Marín	May 2012	June 2013
Minister of Economy, Industry & Trade	Mayi Antillón	May 2010	May 2014
Minister of Education	Leonardo Garnier*	May 2010	May 2014
Minister of Finance	Fernando Herrero	May 2010	May 2012
Minister of Finance	Edgar Ayales Esna	May 2012	May 2014
Minister of Foreign Affairs	René Castro	May 2010	July 2011
Minister of Foreign Affairs	Carlos Roverssi	July 2011	September 2011
Minister of Foreign Affairs	José Enrique Castillo	September 2011	May 2014
Minister of Foreign Trade	Anabel González	May 2010	May 2014
Minister of Health	María Luisa Ávila*	May 2010	August 2011
Minister of Health	Daisy María Corrales Díaz	August 2011	May 2014
Minister of Housing	Irene Campos Gómez	May 2010	October 2012
Minister of Housing	Guido Alberto Monage Fernández	December 2012	May 2014
Minister of Justice and Peace	Hernando París*	May 2010	May 2012
Minister of Justice and Peace	Fernando Ferraro Castro	May 2012	June 2013
Minister of Justice and Peace	José Enrique Castillo	June 2013	May 2014
Minister of Labor and Social Security	Sandra Piszk	May 2010	October 2012
Minister of Labor and Social Security	Olman Segura	October 2012	May 2014
Minister of Planning and Economic Policy	Laura Alfaro	May 2010	March 2011
Minister of Planning and Economic Policy	Roberto Gallardo Núñez*	March 2011	May 2014
Minister of the Presidency	Marco Vargas	May 2010	April 2011
Minister of the Presidency	Carlos Ricardo Benavides	April 2011	May 2014
Minister of Public Security	José María Tijerino Pacheco	May 2010	April 2011
Minister of Public Security	Mario Zamora Cordero	May 2011	May 2014
Minister of Public Works and Transportation	Francisco Jiménez	May 2010	May 2012
Minister of Public Works and Transportation	Luis Llach Cordero	June 2012	September 2012
Minister of Public Works and Transportation	Pedro Castro Fernández	September 2012	May 2014
Minister of Science and Technology	Clotilde Fonseca	May 2010	February 2011
Minister of Science and Technology	Alejandro Cruz Molina	February 2011	March 2014
Minister of Sports	Guiselle Goyenaga	May 2010	February 2011
Minister of Sports	Carlos Ricardo Benavides*	February 2011	May 2011
Minister of Sports	William Todd McSam	May 2011	April 2012
Minister of Sports	Manuel Obregon López	May 2012	June 2012
Minister of Sports	William Corrales	December 2012	May 2014
Minister of Tourism	Carlos Ricardo Benavides	May 2010	April 2011
Minister of Tourism	Allen Flores	April 2011	March 2014

=== Controversies and Political Crises ===
During her presidency, the Chinchilla Miranda administration faced a sharp decline in its approval ratings. Multiple public opinion surveys conducted by the Center for Research and Political Studies (CIEP) at the University of Costa Rica, along with private polling firms, indicated a sustained deterioration in public perception of her governance, placing her at various points among the leaders with the lowest approval ratings in the region. Factors contributing to this low popularity included frequent cabinet reshuffles, controversies surrounding public infrastructure projects, and strategic communication crises within her administration. According to the Sociopolitical Opinion Study conducted by CIEP in January 2014, 63.6% of respondents rated the administration's performance as poor or very poor.

==== Appointment of Celso Gamboa ====
During her administration, Chinchilla appointed Celso Gamboa to key national security positions, leading to his role as Vice Minister of Public Security. In subsequent years, following Gamboa's arrest and criminal investigation for alleged ties to drug trafficking operations and corruption, the former president publicly stated that his initial appointment to public office was based on the recommendation of the Minister of Public Security, maintaining that no allegations existed against him at the time.

==== Private Aircraft Controversy ====
In May 2013, the president faced a severe political crisis following revelations that she had taken two international trips aboard a private Gulfstream 200 aircraft owned by THX Energy. The flight to Peru for a private event disclosed that the aircraft was linked to Colombian businessman Gabriel Morales Fallon, who had been investigated for alleged connections to drug trafficking and money laundering. The controversy led to the resignations of the Minister of the Presidency, Carlos Ricardo Benavides; the Minister of Communication, Mayrení Barahona; and the Director of the Intelligence and Security Service (DIS), Mauricio Boraschi.

==== Dismissal of the Vice Minister of Youth Following Intimate Video Leak ====
In July 2012, the administration became entangled in a media controversy following the dismissal of the Vice Minister of Youth, Karina Bolaños, after an intimate video was leaked on social media networks. The government's decision sparked national and international debate regarding right to privacy and gender discrimination. The decision was criticized for its swiftness—which denied the official an opportunity to present a defense—as well as for treating the victim as the responsible party, according to legal and gender analysts.

==== Protests in Defense of the CCSS and Allegations of Police Repression ====
Protests in Costa Rica, 2012.

Throughout 2012, the Chinchilla administration faced a series of social demonstrations led by healthcare trade unions, university collectives, and civil society organizations, centered on demanding solutions to the financial and institutional crisis of the Social Security Fund (CCSS). The peak of tension occurred on November 8, 2012, when a demonstration by healthcare workers and citizens outside the CCSS headquarters in San José led to clashes with the Public Force. The day ended with the arrest of several individuals, including trade union leaders and physicians, alongside allegations of excessive use of police force. The events of November 8 generated widespread social and academic condemnation. The University Council and the President's Office of the University of Costa Rica (UCR) issued official statements denouncing the police action, which triggered a massive student and civic march on November 15, 2012, protesting against police repression and in defense of civil liberties. During the mobilization, the student body formally delivered to the CCSS Board of Directors the petition that could not be submitted the previous week due to the altercations.

==== Inter-Power Friction and the "Gag Law" Debate ====
Parallel to the social unrest, the country's political landscape in 2012 was marked by friction between the branches of government and legislative instability. Among the main points of public debate were criticisms of the reform to the Cybercrime Law—popularly known as the "Gag Law" (Ley Mordaza) initially passed by Congress. The legislation drew sharp opposition from journalistic associations, academics, and human rights defenders, who argued that it created loopholes for the criminalization of investigative journalism and restricted freedom of the press and expression. Public pressure ultimately forced subsequent revisions to the legal framework to amend the disputed articles.

== Policies and political views ==
Chinchilla's politics have been described as centre-right, and she is considered a social conservative.

=== Economy ===
At the time of Chinchilla's inauguration, the Great Recession had caused Costa Rica's economy to decline, and recovery from the recession took place during her term. GDP growth reached 5% at its highest point while she was president, while overall poverty and unemployment increased.

Chinchilla was expected to give continuity to the previous government's pro-free trade policies. She signed free trade agreements with China and Singapore, but the deals were not completed. Chinchilla also began the process of incorporating Costa Rica into the OECD.

Chinchilla increased taxes on corporations and allocated the funds to security.

=== Crime and security ===
Chinchilla had significant experience in security issues when she was elected president, as this was the main area in which she worked, and it was one of her main policy areas of interest. Her security policy saw a mixed response. During her presidency, the number of homicides went down, but other violent crimes became more common. Femicide declined during her term by nearly 70%. In her first hundred days as president, Chinchilla hired hundreds of police officers and expanded the country's prison capacity. After conducting a citizen consultation, the Citizen Security and Social Peace Policy (POLSEPAZ) was designed, defining the main strategic lines of action and the need to promote a comprehensive, sustainable and state policy on the matter.

Chinchilla rejected more punitive measures against crime outside of major drug trafficking crimes. Instead, she described poverty and inequality as leading causes of crime, and her welfare policy was integrated with her security policy. She held a moderate position on crime, favoring strong enforcement in conjunction with prevention.

=== Environment ===
Chinchilla was a supporter of environmentalist policies while she was president. During her campaign, she declared her intention to see Costa Rica be carbon neutral by 2021. In 2011, she implemented Costa Rica's second moratorium on petroleum exploitation, which was later extended. To do so, she cited the constitution's guarantee of a right to a health environment. Costa Rica only had limited petroleum operations, but the move was met with extended legal challenges from energy companies.

The government sustainability variable was displayed by Chinchilla promoting policies for the generation of clean energy which exceeded 90% of electricity generation from renewable sources, at the end of her term. Equal importance was given to the protection of the seas, through Chinchilla's extension of marine protection zones and a strong fight against shark finning, this led to international recognition for her efforts made towards sustainability.

One of Chinchilla's first actions upon taking office was to restore a ban on open-pit gold mining, which had been a subject of controversy in Arias's presidency.

=== Education ===
Education became one Chinchilla's greatest priorities. She moved into action Article 78 of Costa Rica’s Constitution, The Strengthening Education Effort, whereby the government must allocate 8% of its funding toward education. During her tenure the actual figure reached 7.2%, the highest of any country in the region.

Chinchilla continued the Avancemos program that Arias had established in 2006 to give financial support to families in extreme poverty as their children progress in school.

=== Foreign relations ===
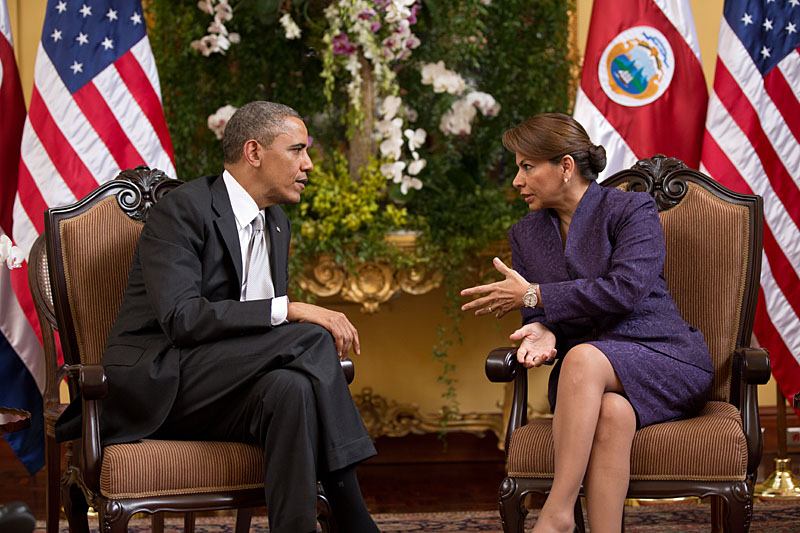
Chinchilla meets with U.S. President Barack Obama on 3 May 2013

After leaving office, Chinchilla joined Arias and other Latin American figures in a joint statement supporting the Cuban thaw and demanding democracy in Cuba.

=== Social issues ===
One of Chinchilla's main programs as president was Red de Cuido (Network of Care), which funded child care and elderly care. It was first established after she took office in 2010, having spoken about it extensively during her campaign. The program involved many organizations, such as the Joint Social Welfare Institute, CEN-CINAI PANI, local governments, community NGOs, and churches. The program was expanded in May 2014 when Chinchilla signed the National Network of Care into law, creating the Technical Secretariat of the Network of Care. 852 new care sites had been built through the program during Chinchilla's presidency. This program was recognized by international organizations.

Chinchilla opposed separation of church and state in Costa Rica, wishing to retain its status as a Roman Catholic nation.

Chinchilla opposed abortion and emergency contraception as president. She also opposed in vitro fertilisation, but she legalized it in April 2013 following an order from the Inter-American Court of Human Rights.

Chinchilla personally opposed same-sex marriage as president, but she agreed to sign a bill that made it legal. The law was later rejected as invalid by the courts.

== Post-presidency (2014–present) ==
Chinchilla led the Observation Mission deployed by the OAS to Mexico to observe the June 2015 federal election, as well as the Observation Electoral Mission during the 2016 elections in the US, and the electoral process in Brazil and in Paraguay in 2018.

Chinchilla currently teaches at Georgetown University at the Institute of Politics and Public Service and is also the titular of the Cathedra José Bonifácio, at the University of São Paulo, since 2018, and leads the Latin American Chair of Citizenship in the School of Government and Public Transformation of the Monterrey Institute of Technology and Higher Education.

Since 2016, Chinchilla has been serving as the president of the Advisory Council of She Works, a company focused on the empowerment of women; and is also a rapporteur for the freedom of expression of the Telecommunications Organization of Latin America.

Chinchilla was widowed on 15 April 2019, when her husband died of Alzheimer's.

In 2019, Chinchilla served on the advisory board of the annual Human Development Report of the United Nations Development Programme (UNDP), co-chaired by Thomas Piketty and Tharman Shanmugaratnam. In 2020, she was Costa Rica's candidate to head the Washington-based Inter-American Development Bank. Shortly before the vote, she dropped her bid, arguing that the process favored U.S. President Donald Trump’s nominee Mauricio Claver-Carone.

In addition, Chinchilla holds numerous other positions, including the following:

- International Institute for Democracy and Electoral Assistance (International IDEA), Member of the Board of Advisers (since 2020)
- Atlantic Council, Member of the Advisory Council to the Adrienne Arsht Latin America Center
- Club of Madrid, Vice-President
- Concordia Summit, Member of the Board
- Council of Women World Leaders, Member
- Inter-American Dialogue, Member of the Board of Directors Co-Chair (since 2019)
- International Olympic Committee, Member (since 2019)
- Kofi Annan Foundation, Co-Chair of the Commission on Elections and Democracy in the Digital Age (since 2019)

== Awards and recognition ==
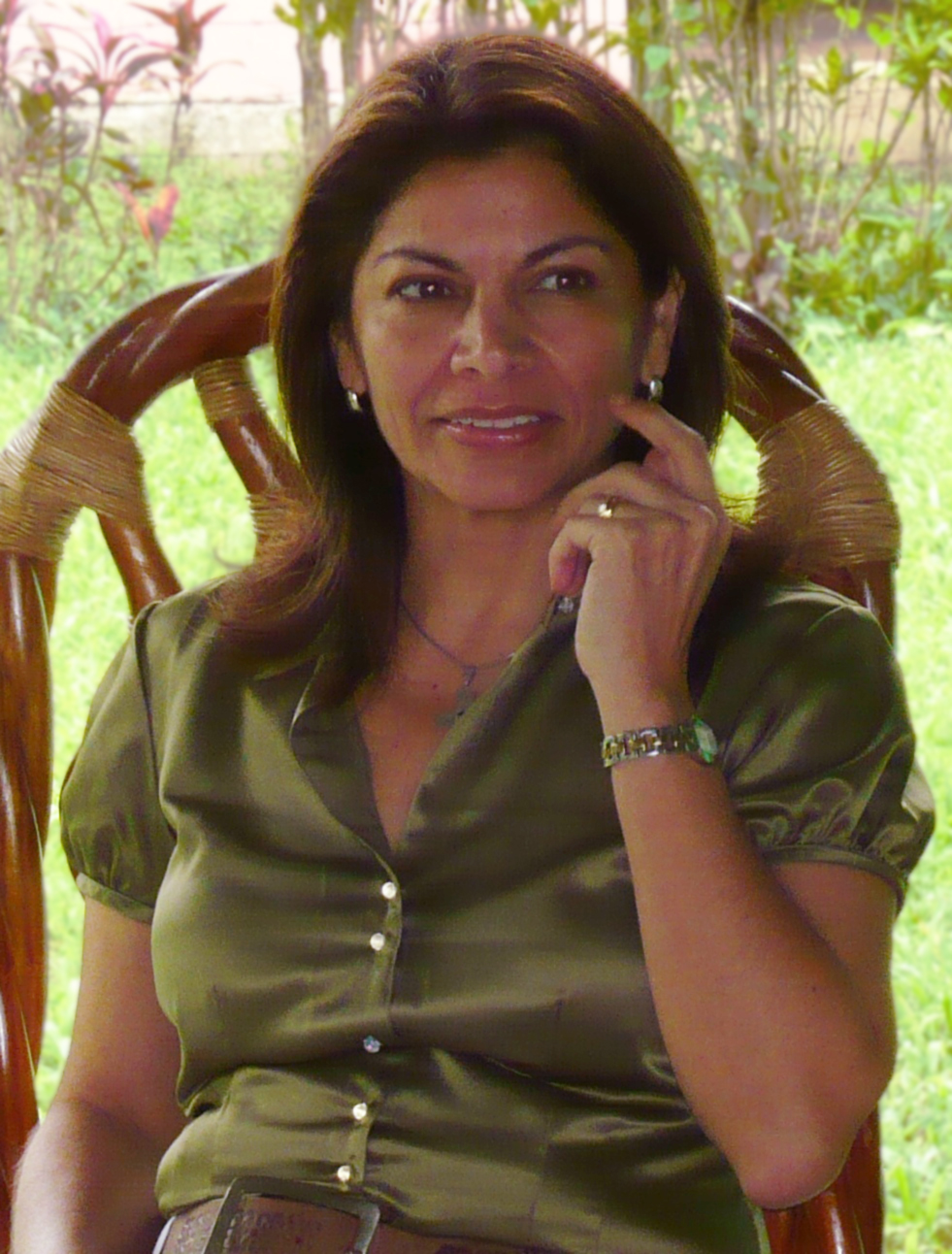
Laura Chinchilla in 2010

Chinchilla was awarded with the “Women of the Decade in Public Life and Leadership Award” at the Women Economic Forum in Amsterdam. She holds Honorary Doctorates from the University for Peace of the United Nations, Georgetown University, and Kyoto University of Foreign Studies.

== Publications ==
She has several publications, in Spanish and English—books, monographs and articles—on issues related to the administration of justice, citizen security, and police reform. Among the most prominent are:

- Community Crime Prevention, Center for the Administration of Citizen Security Justice in Latin America, Siglo XXI Editors (2002).
- Police Reforms in Latin America, Open Society Institute (2006).
- Seguridad Ciudadana en América Latina y el Caribe. Laura Chinchilla and Doreen Vorndran. BID (2018).
- Unfulfilled Promises. Latin America Today The InterAmerican Dialogue (2019).

== See also ==
- Politics of Costa Rica
- Religion in Costa Rica

Assembly seats
Preceded by Guido Monge Fernández	Deputy of the Legislative Assembly of Costa Rica for San José's 13th Office; 2002–2006	Succeeded by Evita Arguedas Maklouf
Party political offices
Preceded by Fernando Naranjo Villalobos	PLN nominee for First-Vice President of Costa Rica; 2006	Succeeded by Alfio Piva
Preceded by Óscar Arias	PLN nominee for President of Costa Rica; 2010	Succeeded by Johnny Araya Monge
Political offices
Preceded by Lineth Saborío Chaverri	First-Vice President of Costa Rica; 2006–2008	Succeeded by Alfio Piva
Preceded by Óscar Arias	President of Costa Rica; 2010–2014	Succeeded by Luis Guillermo Solís
Diplomatic posts
Preceded by Raúl Castro	President pro tempore of CELAC; 2014	Succeeded by Luis Guillermo Solís
