= Dinorah Bolandi =

Costa Rican artist

Dinora Bolandi
- Born: 28 April 1923; San José, Costa Rica
- Died: 2004; Costa Rica
- Occupation: painter

Dinora(h) Bolandi Jimenez (1923 – 2004) was a Costa Rican artist. She studied in the United States, taught at the University of Costa Rica and created hundreds of paintings. She won the leading national prize for art in 1990.

== Life ==
Bolandi was born in 1923 in San José. Her father, Walter Bolandi, was a leading photographer and cinematographer and her mother, Marina Jiménez, was a pianist. She had drawing lessons from Fausto Pacheco. Her mother became her companion after she returned from fifteen years studying in Colorado and in New York with Ivan Olinsky and Robert Brackman.

She worked as a photographer in the 1960s before she became a professor at the University of Costa Rica and later at the National University of Colombia. Bolandi was not interested in exhibiting her work and only showed four pieces of work and only to please others. She was given the Magón National Prize for Culture although she did not consider herself worthy of it. She retired in 1983.

She was in the first wave of Costa Rican women artists that included Margarita Bertheau, Lola Fernandez and Sonia Romero. These four who all taught fine art at the University of Costa Rica are said to have inspired the second generation of Costa Rican women artists.

Dinora eventually became a near recluse in Escazú, selling little, and using her mother, her dog, and the occasional stranger as models.

== Death and legacy ==
Bolandi died in 2004 leaving over two hundred paintings to the Central Banks museums. In 2014 it was announced that a new combined gallery and waiting area at the second floor of Melico Salazar Theatre would be named in honour of Bolandi.
