= Melico Salazar Theatre =

Theatre in San José, Costa Rica

Teatro Popular Melico Salazar
- Raventós Theater
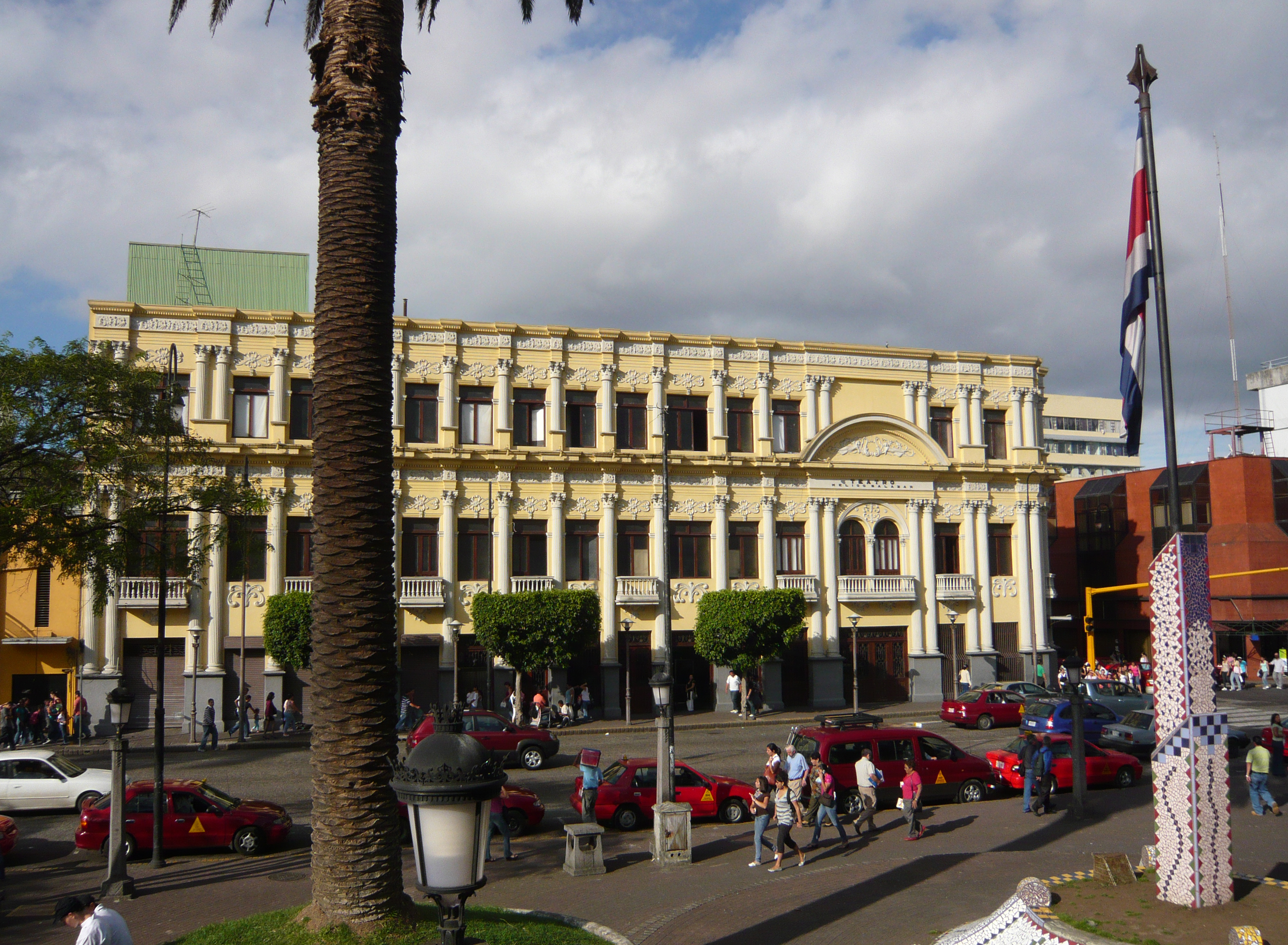
- Interactive map of Teatro Popular Melico Salazar
- Address: San José, Costa Rica
- Coordinates: 9.9335°N 84.0794°W
- Owner: Ministry of Culture, Youth, and Sports
- Capacity: 1,040
- Type: Historic property

Construction
- Opened: 7 February 1928
- Years active: 1928-present
- Architect: José Fabio Garnier Ugalde

The Melico Salazar Theatre is located in San José, Costa Rica. It maintains a full schedule of concerts, recitals, and plays.

While large and built in the European Baroque style, it is far simpler than the Parisian influenced National Theatre one block east.

The land was bought by Jose Raventós, who dreamed of building a theatre in which to produce zarzuelas, usually comic) Spanish operettas. The building was designed by Jose Fabio Garnier Ugalde, dramatist and architect. Construction began 8 February 1927, and was completed 7 October 1928. The inauguration featured operettas of Esperanza Iris, the famous Mexican singer known as the Empress of Operetta.

In 1960 a new gallery was added that included a screen for cinemascope. Seven years later, in 1967, during the dawn of 23 April, a fire destroyed the room.

In the early 1970s, the Ministry of Culture, Youth, and Sports decided that Costa Rica must buy the theater and renew it. In December 1981, a pre-inauguration occurred. Shortly afterwards, the building was closed to finish the restoration. There was a re-inauguration 6 March 1985, and 7 April the following year. "The Gaceta", the official newspaper of the government, announced law 7023 that gave the Melico Salazar the position of "cultural institution especializada" of the Costa Rican State.

In 2014 it was announced that a new combined gallery and waiting area at the theatre would be named in honour of Dinora Bolandi who was a Costa Rican teacher and artist.

The whole facility was once named the Raventós Theater, it was renamed in 1986 to honor the famous Costa Rican tenor Manuel "Melico" Salazar.
