= Jorge Cabrera Medaglia =

- Born: Costa Rica
- Education: BCL, LLM, MBA, DCL, University of Costa Rica
- Awards: Latin-American Leaderships for the New Millennium (Líderes Latinoamericanos para el Nuevo Milenio), 1999 (Time Magazine and CNN), La Nacion

Jorge Cabrera Medaglia is an international and national jurist in biodiversity law and legal aspects relating to Access and Benefit Sharing, and a professor in the graduate program in law at the University of Costa Rica. In addition, he is a Legal Adviser to Instituto Nacional de Biodiversidad in Costa Rica, a consultant, and Lead Counsel for Biodiversity at the Centre for International Sustainable Development Law.

== Education ==
Cabrera completed his Bachelor of Civil Law, Master of Law, and later a Doctorate of Civil Law at the University of Costa Rica. In addition, he obtained a Master of Business Administration from the National University of Costa Rica.

== Professional career ==
Cabrera was a negotiator for Costa Rica at the first meeting of the Conference of the Parties to the Convention on Biological Diversity, as well as a member of the National Biodiversity Commission (1995-1998). He continued on the delegation of Costa Rica from 2000-2010, and at COP 10 in 2010 co-chaired the negotiations on Traditional Knowledge.

In 1999 Cabrera was named Latin-American Leaderships for the New Millennium (Líderes Latinoamericanos para el Nuevo Milenio), La Nacion

Cabrera is a professor of environmental law at the University of Costa Rica. and a Legal Adviser to Instituto Nacional de Biodiversidad. In addition, Cabrera is Lead Counsel for Biodiversity at the Centre for International Sustainable Development Law, and has acted as a consultant for intergovernmental organizations such as the Convention on Biological Diversity, FAO, ICTSD, and UNCTAD among others.

Through his work Cabrera has contributed in the drafting of ABS laws in Costa Rica, Nicaragua, Panama, El Salvador, Chile, Dominica, Bhutan, Seychelles, Honduras, and Paraguay.

== Publications ==
Cabrera has contributed to over 100 articles and technical reports on ABS.
