= Manuel María Gutiérrez =

Costa Rican musician, composer, and military man

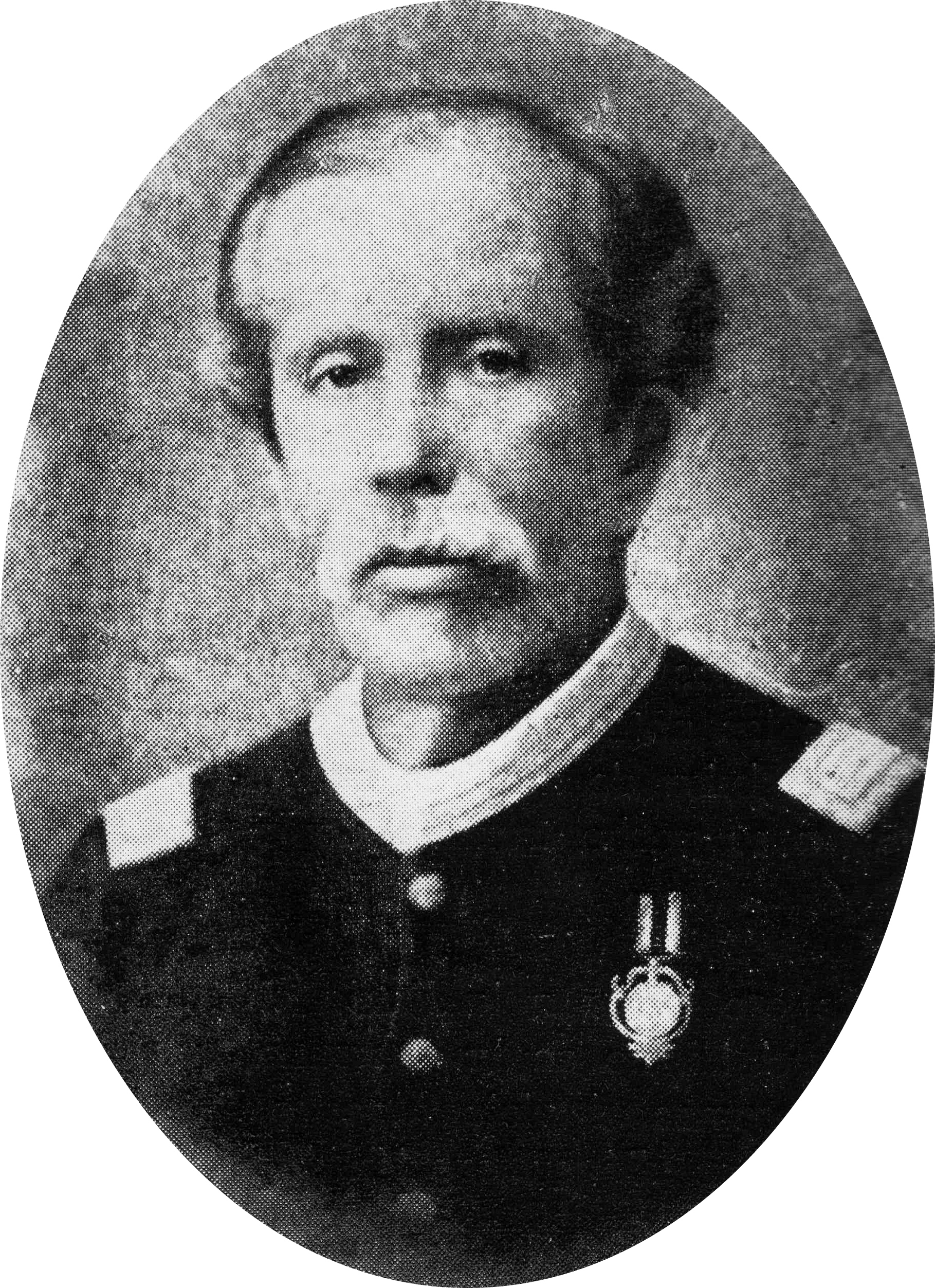
- Manuel María Gutiérrez
- Born: Manuel María de Jesús Gutiérrez Flores; 3 September 1829; Heredia, Costa Rica
- Died: 25 December 1887 (aged 58); San José, Costa Rica
- Citizenship: Spanish
- Occupations: Musician; Composer; Politician; Military man
- Known for: Author of the National anthem of Costa Rica

Manuel María de Jesús Gutiérrez Flores (3 September 1829 – 25 December 1887) was a Costa Rican musician, composer, and military man. He was the author of the music of the National anthem of Costa Rica, whose first performance took place on 11 June 1852, when President Juan Rafael Mora Porras received the delegations from the United States and Great Britain. He is also the author of the music of the Patriótica costarricense.

In addition to his merits as an artist, he also held important public and military positions, being a veteran of the Filibuster War, having achieved the rank of Captain of the Army of the Republic. He was declared Benemérito de la Patria in 1977.

== Early and personal life ==
Manuel María Gutiérrez was born on 3 September 1829 in Heredia, Costa Rica, as the oldest child of Anna María Gutiérrez Flores, who does not appear with a registered husband. In his baptismal certificate, dated September 1829, he is recorded as "natural son of Ana Gutiérrez" and in his marriage certificate of 1856, it is said that he is "son of Mrs. Doña Ana Gutiérrez", as it appears in all registered documents.

On 24 October 1856, Gutiérrez married Joaquina Regina Umaña Orozco (1835–1910) in his native Heredia, and the couple had at least seven Gutiérrez Umaña children, Ana María Elisa del Rosario (1859), Adelina Sinforosa del Carmen (1862), Manuel Félix (1865–66), Julia (1867–68), Ana María Margarita (1872), José Carlos Sixto (1874), and Víctor Segundo de los Dolores (1876). Notably, the eldest of his daughters was baptized in 1859, in the Parish of Our Lady of El Carmen in San José.

== Musical career ==
=== Early stages ===
Gutiérrez did his primary studies in Heredia, where he developed a deep interest in musical art. From a very young age, Gutiérrez attracted attention for his ability to play the violin. The musician Damián Dávila (1800–1861), who went on to found a family that achieved renown in the musical and intellectual field in Costa Rica, became his close relative after he married Antolina Gutiérrez Flores (1806–1872), first cousin of his mother, and subsequently, his first music teacher, training Gutiérrez professionally. On 13 May 1842, the 12-year-old Gutiérrez provided his services as a piccolo player in the main barracks of San José, and in September of the same year, he was transferred to the Plaza de Heredia, where he appeared as a musician in the Military Band until 1845. In Holy Week of 1843, he disobeyed the order to play and for this reason, he was arrested for eight days, which revealed his rebellious and somewhat violent character.

In 1845, Gutiérrez became a disciple of maestro José Martínez, who was appointed as Master General of Bands of the Republic on 1 January 1846. On 3 September 1846, precisely the day he turned 17, he was chosen by Martínez to become First Sergeant of the Band of the Heredia Regiment and Veteran Drum Major, which was the equivalent of being the Director of the Band. In addition to his merits as an artist, he also held important public and military positions; for instance, in his military functions, he actively participated in suppressing the uprisings against the Government in 1847 and 1848, the first led by the brothers José María and Florentino Alfaro Zamora, and the second by Juan Alfaro Ruiz. In 1848, when the Heredia and Alajuela bands were suppressed, Gutiérrez moved to the Capital Band, and on 22 March 1852, he occupied the position of General Directorate of Bands of the Republic, for which both José Martínez and General José Joaquín Mora had recommended him, the former having died just a few days earlier on 2 March. Three months later, on 11 June, he composed the National Hinno, which has since been officially accepted for all solemn acts of the Republic.

=== Composition of the National Anthem of Costa Rica ===
In June 1852, Gutiérrez was commissioned by the then president of Costa Rica, Juan Rafael Mora Porras, who was his relative through the maternal line, to compose the National Anthem, which was to be performed as part of the preparations to receive delegates from the United Kingdom (Charles L. Wyke) and the United States (Robert M. Walsh) for the Webster-Crampton Treaty. Finally, on 11 June 1852, the National Anthem of Costa Rica was played for the first time in the Government House. The music of the anthem was official for more than 100 years, but it was not until 1 September 1979, that a decree made it official, according to article 1 of decree No. 10471-E, on the 150th anniversary of the birth of the author of the music of the National Anthem: Gutiérrez.

According to myth, Gutiérrez had to compose the music of the anthem locked in a cell, for refusing the order given to him by President Mora Porras to compose the anthem in 24 hours, but despite the dissemination of such a story, the truth is that it took him several days to accomplish the not so easy task of creating the National Anthem, with the place of work being his own house, located in the center of the capital and not a prison. According to his son Víctor, it must have taken at least four days to compose the music, because in addition to the main melody, he had to do the orchestration for the San José Band, in charge of performing the patriotic notes for the first time. However, this myth is based on some truth, because among Gutiérrez's military superiors was General José Joaquín Mora Porras, the brother of the president, who when asked Gutiérrez to compose the anthem, which was interpreted by some as an order and not so much as a request, Gutiérrez refused for the moment, alleging incapacity and very little time, thus justifying the version of the arrest.

== The Filibuster War ==
On 27 June 1853, President Mora Porras granted him the rank of "Lieutenant of the National Militias" in consideration of the great services provided to the Homeland, and on that same year, he was re-appointed as Director of the San José Military Band. On the occasion of the inauguration of the National Palace of Costa Rica in 1855, he composed the waltz El Palacio which was very popular at the time, and of which no sheet music remains to date; there is no score left for the knowledge of current generations.

At the beginning of 1856, Gutiérrez was part of the military mobilization that left Liberia towards the Hacienda Santa Rosa, from where the filibusters were expelled. That first victory motivated him to write his also famous "Santa Rosa March", around which a legend has been generated where it is said that Gutiérrez was writing the march on a stone, in the shade of a tree and suddenly heard cavalry steps, so he climbed the tree and remained hidden there until the horsemen passed by, which is unlikely to be true.

On 11 April, when the filibusters tried to take the city of Rivas, Nicaragua, the Costa Rican General Staff decided to request reinforcements from Lieutenant Colonel Juan Alfaro Ruiz, who was in La Virgen, but the main escape routes were blocked by the enemy; this mission to request reinforcements was entrusted to Lieutenant Gutiérrez, who offered himself, mounted his horse and set off at full speed, opening a field between the enemy ranks by riding the horse sideways to protect himself from the bullets, and then successfully completed the mission, which tilted the forces in favor of Costa Rica, who won the battle. He was awarded a medal of recognition for those deeds.

== Later life ==
At the end of that year, when the second campaign was undertaken, to enrage the soldiers, he composed a patriotic hymn that was sung in the Capital Choir with lyrics by Augustín Mendoza.

In 1858, Gutiérrez understood that he lacked knowledge about the mechanism of the string and wind musical instruments essential to properly arranging an orchestra, suitable for the lyrical companies that could enter the country, so he begged General Cañas, Minister at the time, to lend him the sum of five hundred pesos from the Public Treasury to go to Havana to study and listen their music, the progress of which there was on par with Europe. He lent her the money that upon his return she deducted for monthly payments in accordance with his commitment. In the capital of Cuba he dedicated himself to arranging instrumentation to train musicians in the lyrical genre and he successfully achieved his goal, because when he returned, he was able to present a regular orchestra. For a few years, Gutiérrez was responsible for the organization of all the Bands of the Republic that have exerted so much influence on the development of the country's culture.

== Death ==
Gutiérrez died in San José, on 25 December 1887, at the age of 58. He was declared Benemérito de la Patria and Honorary Associate of the Association of Composers and Musical Authors (ACAM). The Park in front of the Church of El Carmen de Heredia, where a bust is located in his memory, is named after him.

== Works ==
In addition to the National anthem of Costa Rica, some of his memorable works are the El Palacio waltz (lost), the Santa Rosa march (written during the National Campaign), the Regina mazurka (dedicated to his wife), the funeral march "Memories from a friend" (in honor of the national hero José María Gutiérrez, a relative of his who died in the Battle of Santa Rosa), the marches El artillero, La Costarricense, Resurrección, the bullseye La Independencia. His last composition was Plegaria, which he performed on the day of the death of his third cousin, General Tomás Guardia Gutiérrez. He composed in total about 40 musical works.

== Bibliography ==
- Meléndez Chaverri, Carlos (1994). Manuel María Gutiérrez (2ed. edición). San José, Costa Rica [Manuel María Gutiérrez (2nd edition). San Jose Costa Rica]. UNED. pp. 38–132. ISBN 9977-64-791-7.
