= Margarita Bertheau =

Costa Rican painter, ballerina and costume designer (1913–1975)

- Born: Margarita Bertheau Odio; 13 May 1913; San José, Costa Rica
- Died: 21 November 1975 (aged 62); Escazú canton, Costa Rica
- Education: Academia Nacional de Bellas Artes San Alejandro
- Occupations: Painter; ballerina; ballet teacher; set designer; costume designer

Margarita Bertheau Odio (13 May 1913 – 21 November 1975) was a Costa Rican painter, ballerina, ballet teacher, scenic and costume designer. Bertheau was a member of the first wave of Costa Rican female artists.

== Biography ==
Bertheau was born on 13 May 1913 in San José to Alberto Bertheau Zenea, a businessperson and shoemaker, and Rosalía Odio Méndez. Bertheau's mother was Cuban whilst her father was Costa Rican and of French descent.

In 1924 (Note: Also cited as 1929.), Bertheau's family settled in Havana and she began studying at the Academia Nacional de Bellas Artes San Alejandro.

== Havana and Bogotá ==
In 1929, Bertheau joined the atelier of Rafael Lillo y Foraster, a Spanish painter and architect, whom she studied under for 10 years. Upon attending a performance at the Ballet Pro Arte, Bertheau joined the workshop of Nikolai Yavorsky. Bertheau performed in several ballet productions, and began creating costume and set designs.

In 1940, Bertheau returned to Costa Rica before settling in Bogotá, Colombia the following year. In Bogotá, Bertheau worked as a ballet teacher, costume and scenic designer for the Teatro de Cristóbal Colón.

== Costa Rica ==
In 1942, Bertheau relocated to San José and began teaching at the University of Costa Rica. Bertheau had independent views and was contemporary with the first wave of Costa Rican artists that included Dinora Bolandi, Lola Fernandez and Sonia Romero. These four are famous for teaching fine art at the University of Costa Rica and to have created the second generation of Costa Rican women artists.

During the 1940s and 1950s, Bertheau and Francisco Amighetti developed of mural painting techniques to suit Costa Rica's tropical environment. In 1948, Bertheau and Amighetti created the mural Agriculture for the presidential palace, and has been called both pastoral and shocking. It depicts the peasants farming and others running in the distance as a person is being shot.

The Costa Rican Museum of Art states that she is known for "landscapes, portraits, watercolor figures and her geometric, surrealistic and abstract work." Bertheau was called the first female watercolor artist in her country.

=== Ballet ===
Bertheau co-founded the Pro-Arte Ballet Musical, where she worked as a teacher and designer. During this period Bertheau taught Mireya Barboza Mesén (1935–2000), one of the founders of the modern dance movement in Costa Rica. In 1948, the Pro-Arte was shut down by the government for allegedly promoting communist ideas.
