= Francisco Amighetti =

Costa Rican painter

Francisco Amighetti (1907–1998) was a Costa Rican painter. In addition to his paintings, Amighetti also produced wood engravings, poetry and works of art criticism. He based his artwork on basic lifestyle in Costa Rica.

He worked with Margarita Bertheau on a mural called Agriculture. The mural was for the presidential palace and has been called both "pastoral" and "shocking", as it shows the peasants farming but in the distance others run as a person is shot.
