= University of Costa Rica =

Public university in Costa Rica

- Universidad de Costa Rica
- Other name: UCR
- Motto: Lucem Aspicio
- Motto in English: "In search for the light"
- Type: Public, undergraduate, graduate.
- Established: August 26, 1940; 86 years ago
- Budget: CRC 353 711 000 000,00 (610M USD)
- Rector: Carlos Araya Leandro
- Faculty: 3,006
- Students: 42,750 (2018)
- Undergraduates: 39,801
- Postgraduates: 2,949
- Location: San Pedro Montes de Oca, San José, 11501, Costa Rica; 9.935833°N 84.050556°W
- Campus: Both Urban and Rural
- Campus size: 77.5 ha, 775.000 m^{2}
- Colours: Sky blue and white
- Sporting affiliations: CF Universidad de Costa Rica
- Website: www.ucr.ac.cr

The University of Costa Rica (Spanish: Universidad de Costa Rica, abbreviated UCR) is a public university in the Republic of Costa Rica, in Central America. Its main campus, Ciudad Universitaria Rodrigo Facio, is located in San Pedro Montes de Oca, in the province of San José. It is the oldest and largest institution of higher learning in Costa Rica, originally established as the Universidad de Santo Tomás in 1843. Approximately 45,000 students attend UCR throughout the year.

== History ==
The first institution dedicated to higher education in Costa Rica was the University of Saint Thomas (Universidad de Santo Tomás), which was established in 1843. That institution maintained close ties with the Roman Catholic Church and was closed in 1888 by the progressive and anti-clerical government of President Bernardo Soto Alfaro as part of a campaign to modernize public education. The schools of law, agronomy, fine arts, and pharmacy continued to operate independently. In 1940, those four schools were re-united to establish the modern UCR, during the reformist administration of President Rafael Ángel Calderón Guardia.

The UCR remained the country's sole university until the Costa Rica Institute of Technology (Tecnológico de Costa Rica) and the National University of Costa Rica (Universidad Nacional de Costa Rica) were opened by the government in 1972 and 1973, respectively. Years later, in 1979, another public university opened: the Distance State University (Universidad Estatal a Distancia), modeled after the British Open University, and lastly the National Technical University opened in 2008 after merging several trade schools. Today, Costa Rica has those five public universities, and approximately fifty-three small private ones, but the UCR remains the largest and most well funded institution.

== Application ==
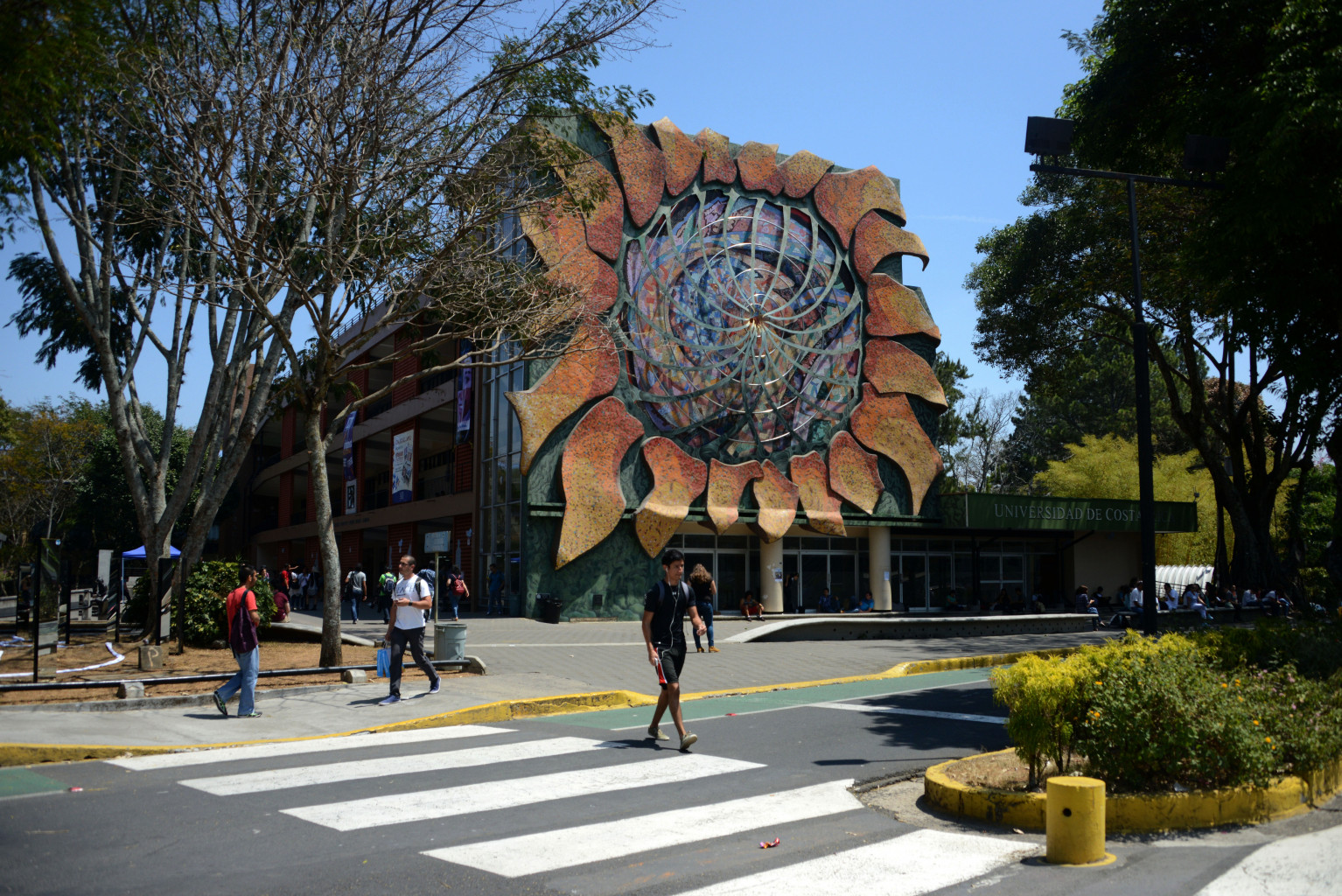
The famous sunflower mural on the building of the Escuela de Estudios Generales at Ciudad Universitaria Rodrigo Facio.

Costa Rican applicants to the UCR must take an admission test. This test is similar to the SAT in the United States. The score of this test is used along with the grades from the student's last years in high school to determine the student's admission score, which is later used to determine admission to a specific major and financial aid. 800 is the highest possible score on the admission test and 442 is the minimum score required for admission. Students who score 800 usually appear in the front pages of Costa Rican newspapers.

Undergraduate Admission is highly selective, having an acceptance rate of approximately 25%. In 2009, out of the 31.042 that completed the admission test, only 16,593 obtained a score above the 442 points required to gain admission. Gaining admission to the university, however, does not assure admission to a chosen departmental program or major. In 2007, only 60% of those admitted to the university were accepted into their chosen major. The remaining 40% have to take classes that may not work for their major, hoping it will lift their grade point average to the level necessary in order to be admitted to the program of their liking.

International applicants must revalidate their high school certificate and grades from their country of origin at the Ministry of Public Education (Ministerio de Educación Pública) in order to apply and take the admission test. Graduate school applicants must revalidate their undergraduate certificate also.

== Campuses and local branches ==
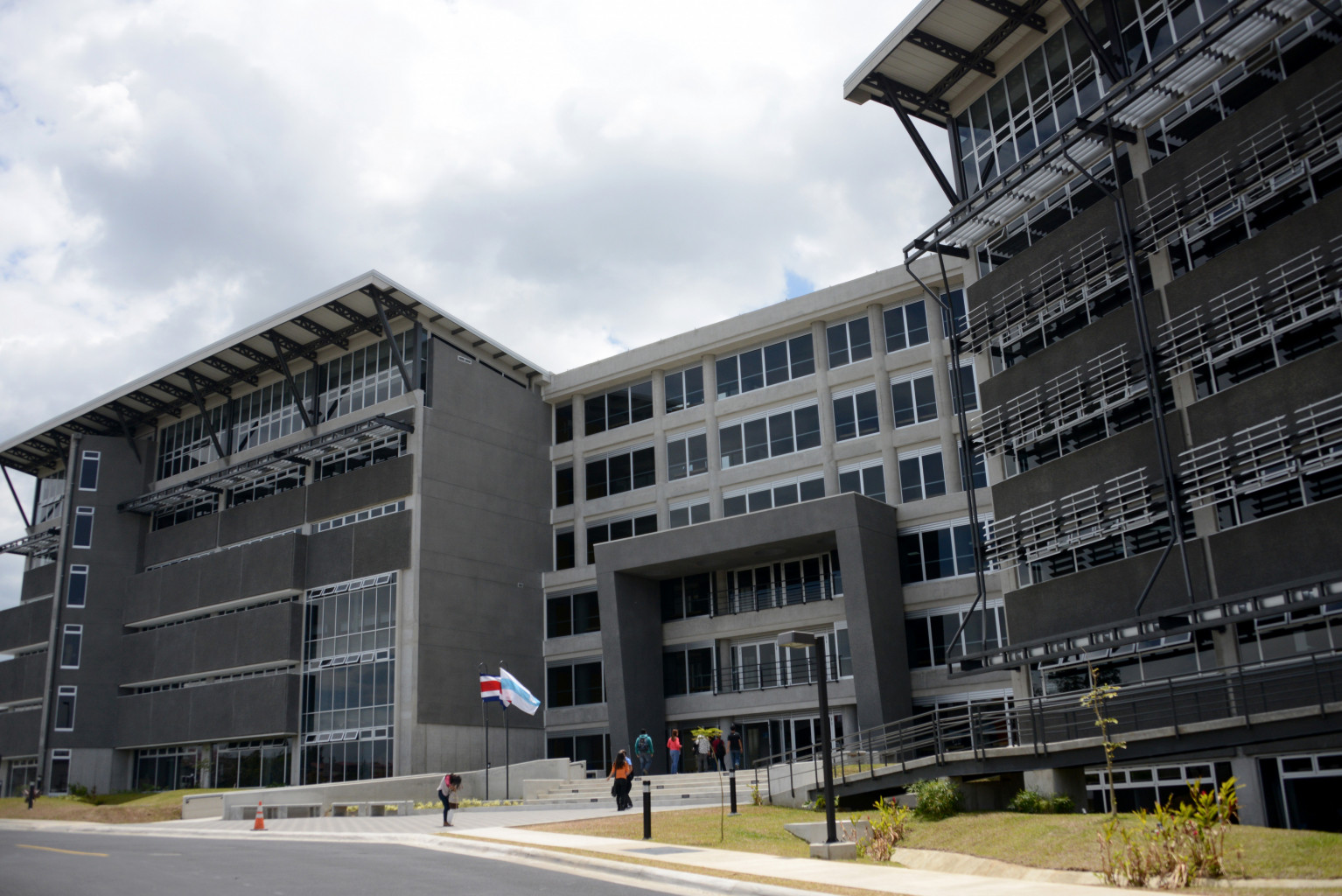
College of Social Sciences building at Ciudad de la Investigación (San Pedro, San José)

The main campus is located on a 100 ha (250-acre) campus in San Pedro, San José (Rodrigo Facio campus). Other regional campuses are located throughout the country to reach plural eata Costa Ricans. The regional campuses are:

- Western Campus (In the city of San Ramón, Alajuela): includes a local branch in Tacares, Grecia
- Atlantic Campus (In the city of Turrialba, Cartago): includes a local branch in Paraíso, Cartago and another one in Guápiles, Limón
- Guanacaste Campus (In the city of Liberia, Guanacaste): includes a local branch in Santa Cruz
- Limon Campus (In the City of Port Limón, Limon).
- Pacific Campus (In the city of Puntarenas, Puntarenas).
- The Golfito Campus (Southern Pacific coast) (in the City of Golfito, Puntarenas).

The main campus in San Pedro offers the most diverse course curricula of any other campus, in addition to hosting the Medical School and graduate programs.

== Social relevance ==
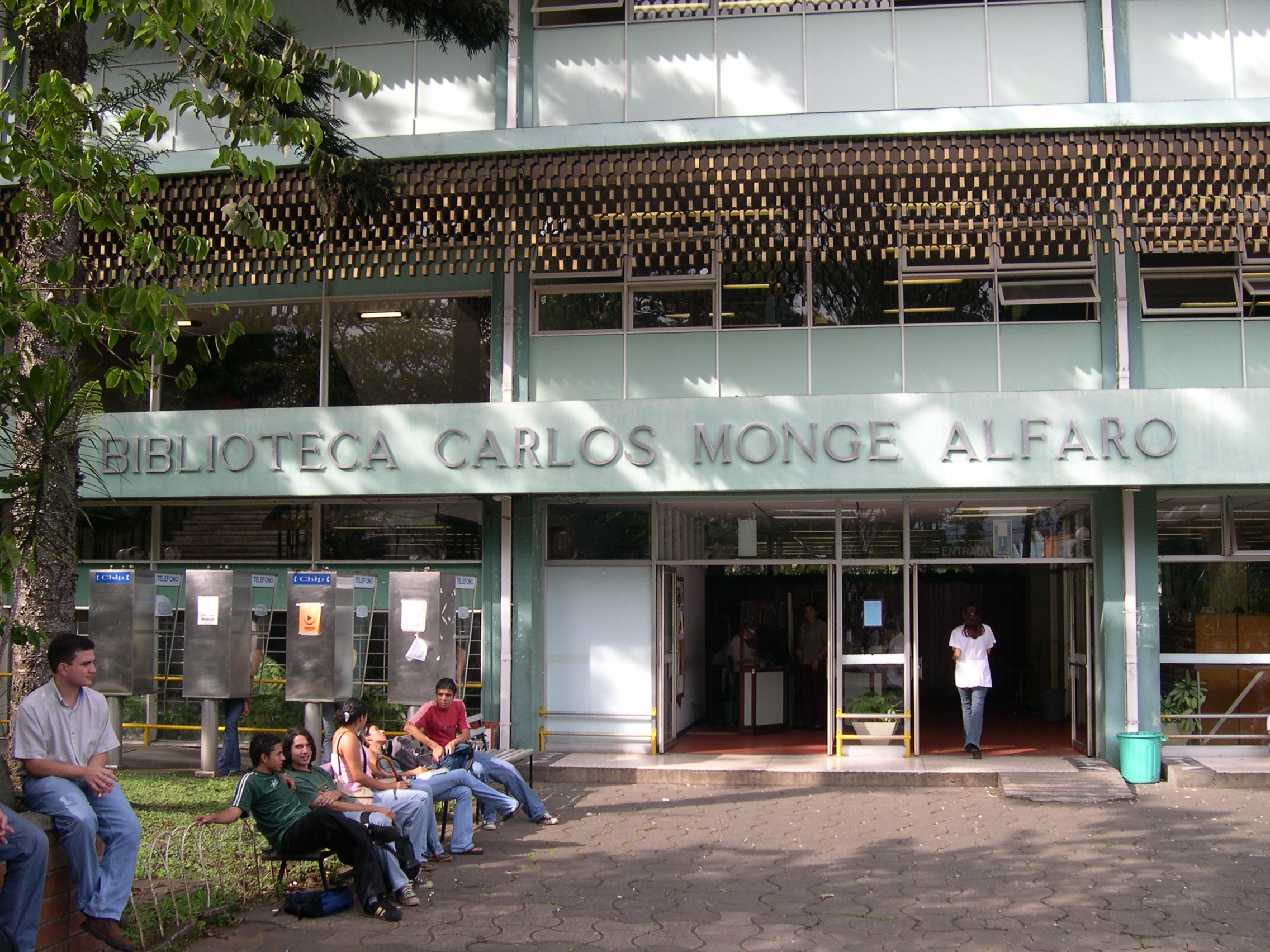
Carlos Monge Library, a library on the main campus in San Pedro.

The university, while neutral on most aspects of Costa Rican life, defines itself as a secular and humanist institution. The university encourages social work and social research activities. In order to graduate, most students must work in the Trabajo Comunal Universitario (University Community Service), which is organized by the university. The university maintains a prestigious position in Costa Rican society and is the most often cited governmental institution in Costa Rican media. Opinions generated on scientific, ethical and economic matters strongly influence Costa Rican policies and public sentiment. Costa Rican law requires the Costa Rican Congress to request the university's opinion (amongst other institutions) on whether a new law should be approved or not.

UCR counts Costa Rica's Nobel laureate Oscar Arias, ex-presidents, many ministers, and many heads of the country's public institutions as alumni.

UCR is also part of the Consejo Nacional de Rectores (National Council of University Rectors), a watchdog body that overviews higher education quality, and recognition of university-level degrees from foreign countries.

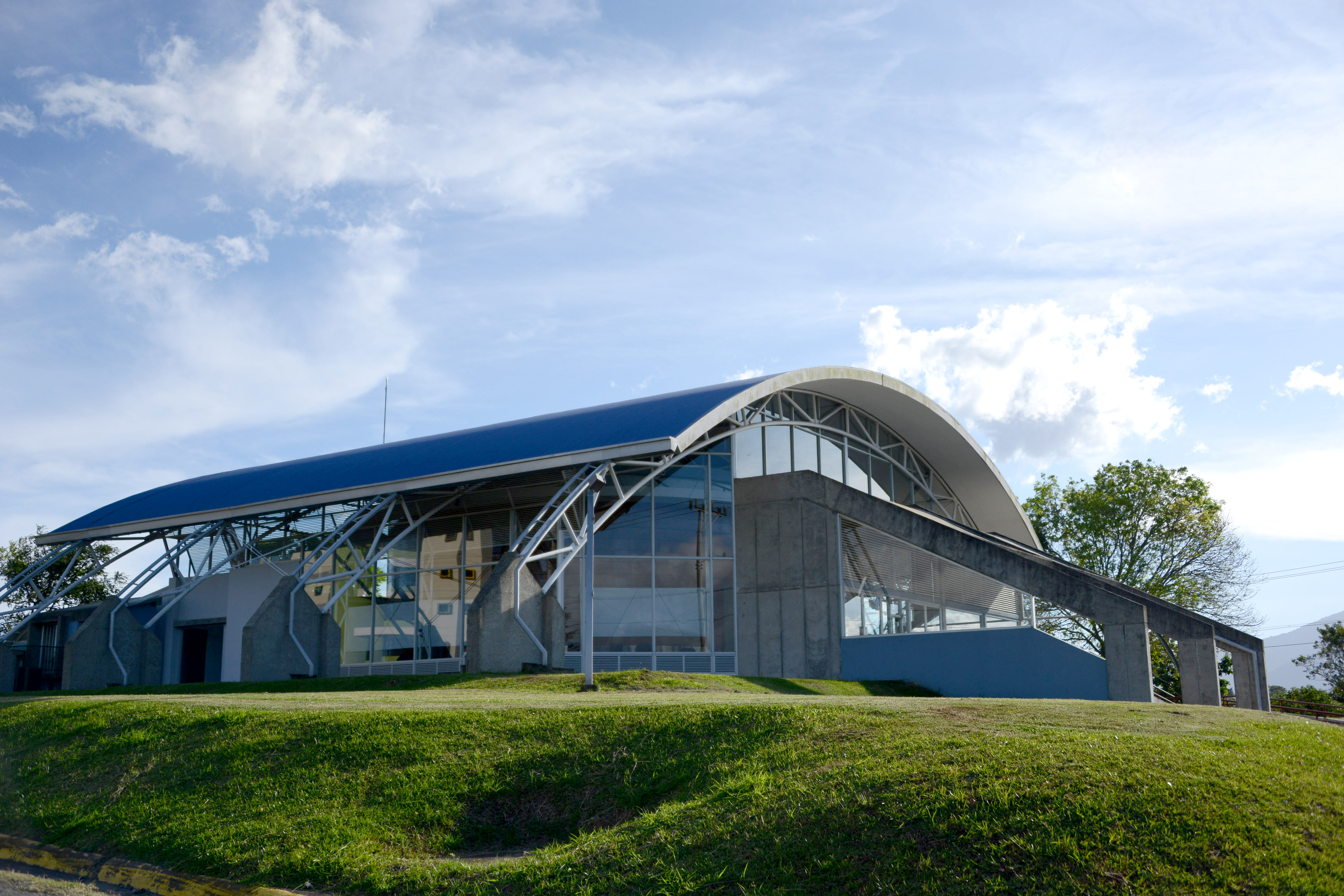
The Planetarium at Ciudad de la Investigación in San Pedro de Montes de Oca

For many years, UCR grew in close partnership with public action of the State, forming the professional staff necessary for the growth of new public institutions such as the Instituto Costarricense de Electricidad (ICE), the Costa Rican Social Security Fund may Social (CCSS) and the State Bank.

== Reputation and rankings ==
University rankings

Global – Overall
- QS World: =499 (2026)
- THE World: 601-800

Regional – Overall
- QS Latin America: 19
- THE Latin America: 37

Currently, the university occupies the first place in Central America and the Caribbean, 19th place in Latin America and 511-520th place worldwide in the QS World University Rankings. In the Webometrics Ranking of World Universities it occupies the 4th place in Central America and the Caribbean, 28th in Latin America and 844 globally.

== International cooperation ==
The university maintains international cooperation alliances with the DAAD (the German Academic Trust), the governments of Japan, France, Mexico, Spain, Taiwan (R.O.C.), the European Union, the OAS and United States research institutions such as the Organization for Tropical Studies, whose headquarters in Costa Rica are located within UCR's central campus (Rodrigo Facio campus). Other universities with ties to the University of Costa Rica are: University of Florida, State University of New York at Albany, University of Texas at Austin, University of Illinois, University of Maryland, Rutgers University and the University of Kansas, which is the oldest standing agreement between two universities in the Western Hemisphere.

The university maintains academic relationships with more than 41 countries, including (in alphabetical order): Argentina, Austria, Belgium, Bolivia, Brazil, Canada, Chile, Colombia, Cuba, Denmark, the Dominican Republic, Ecuador, El Salvador, Finland, France, Germany, Honduras, Iceland, Israel, Italy, Japan, Jamaica, Mexico, the Netherlands, Nicaragua, Norway, Panama, Peru, Portugal, Puerto Rico, Russia, South Korea, Spain, Sweden, Switzerland, Taiwan (R.O.C.), Uruguay, the United Kingdom, the United States, and Venezuela.

== Organization ==
UCR is divided into six major academic areas: Agricultural Sciences, Arts and Letters, Basic Sciences, Engineering, Health and Social Sciences. These areas are divided into colleges, schools and departments, research centers and institutes. The Graduate Studies System offers masters and doctorate degrees in a variety of academic fields.

== Research institutes ==
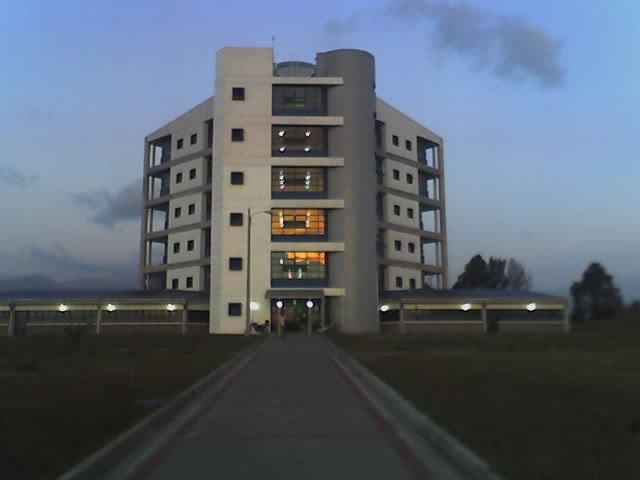
School of Electrical Engineering

The university manages 42 research institutes:

- Center of Studies on Latin American Identity and Culture (CIICLA)
- Institute of Linguistic Research (INIL)
- Institute of Philosophical Research (INIF)
- Agronomical Research Center (CIA)
- National Research Center on Food Science (CITA)
- Center for Research on Agribusiness (CIEDA)
- Research Center on Grains and Seeds (CIGRAS)
- Research Center on Animal Nutrition (CINA)
- Research Center on Plant Protection (CIPROC)
- Institute of Agronomical Investigations (IIA)
- Molecular and Cellular Biology Research Center (CIBCM)
- Center for Research on Materials Science & Engineering (CICIMA)
- Research Center on Microscopic Structures (CIEMIC)
- Research Center on Nuclear and Molecular Sciences ( CICANUM)
- Research Center on Sea Sciences (CIMAR)
- Environmental Pollution Research Center (CICA)
- Research Center on Geological Sciences (CICG)
- Electro-Chemical Energy Research Center (CELEQ)
- Research Center on Natural Products (CIPRONA)
- Center on Space Research (CINESPA)
- Research Center on Geophysics (CIGEFI)
- Research Center on Mathematics and Meta-mathematics (CIMM)
- Research Center on Pure and Applied Mathematics (CIMPA)
- Center for Research on Sustainable Development (CIEDES)
- Institute of Investigations in Engineering (INII)
- Research Center on Information and Communication Technologies (CITIC)
- Central American Population Studies Center (CCP)
- Center for Research and Training on Public Management (CICAP)
- Research Center on Communication (CICOM)
- Center on Women Studies (CIEM)
- Center for Central American Historical Studies (CIHAC)
- Research Center on Political Studies "Dr. José María Castro Madriz" (CIEP)
- Institute of Investigations in Economic Sciences (IICE)
- Institute of Investigations in Psychology (IIP)
- Institute of Juridical Investigations (IIJ)
- Institute of Social Research (IIS)
- Research Center on Tropical Diseases (CIET)
- Research Center on Abnormal Hemoglobins and Related Ailments (CIHATA)
- Research Center on Neurosciences (CIN)
- Clodomiro Picado Institute (ICP)
- Institute of Pharmaceutical Research (INIFAR)
- Institute of Investigations in Health (INISA)
- Human Movement Science Research Center (CIMOHU)

== Events ==
The school calendar runs from March to December, while the academic year in Costa Rican schools and high schools starts in February. The school year is divided into two semesters, plus one additional summer term that may be mandatory depending on the student's chosen career and that extends from early January to late February.

Semana U is an event held during the first semester and involves the participation of the different student organizations. There are many concerts, talks, expositions, and other activities.

The Expo UCR (sometimes called la Expo) is a bi-annual event that showcases the university's work and developments in various areas.

== Transportation ==
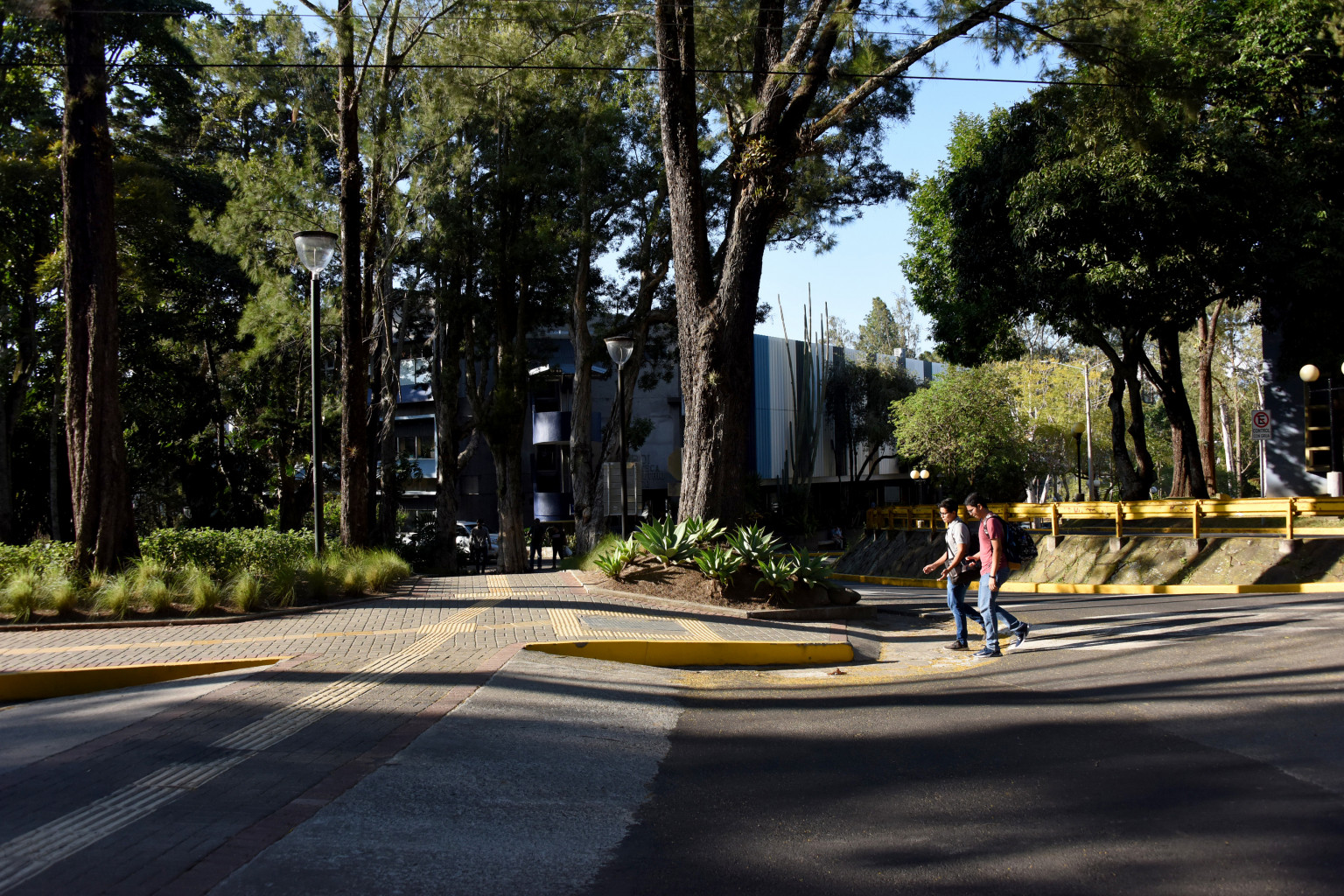
Ciudad Universitaria Rodrigo Facio

An internal free shuttle moves students around its main campus and satellite areas (fincas) including the research campus, sports facilities, and a cluster of laboratories and research centers detached from the main campus by a river and several neighborhoods.

== People ==
The following are notable individuals associated with the University of Costa Rica:

=== Alumni ===
- Josette Altmann Borbón, First Lady of Costa Rica (1994–1998)
- Andrea Álvarez Marín, member of the Legislative Assembly of Costa Rica
- Oscar Arias, President of Costa Rica (1986–1990; 2006–2010), Nobel Peace Laureate
- María Luisa Ávila Agüero (born 1961), Minister of Public Health of Costa Rica from 2006 to 2011
- Jeannette Benavides (born 1952), doctor in physical chemistry, former NASA employee
- Laura Chinchilla, President of Costa Rica (2010–2014)
- Helio Fallas, Vice President of Costa Rica (2014–2018)
- Floria Pinto, artist (1923–2012)
- Silvia Lara Povedano, politician and sociologist
- Danny Vargas Serrano (born 1979), member of the Legislative Assembly of Costa Rica
- Luis Guillermo Solís, President of Costa Rica (2014–2018)
- Carlos Alvarado Quesada, President of Costa Rica (2018–2022)
- Daniel Salas Peraza, Minister of Public Health of Costa Rica (2018–2022)
- Jorge Cabrera Medaglia, lawyer
- Johanna Segovia, Salvadoran marine ecologist

=== Faculty ===
- Marco Antei, mathematician
- Fernando Baudrit Solera, former dean of the University of Costa Rica College of Law and public jurist
- Juan Bernal Ponce, artist
- Margarita Bertheau, artist
- Dinorah Bolandi, artist
- Mónica Aguilar Bonilla, archaeologist
- Maria Eugenia Bozzoli, anthropologist
- Víctor Cañas, architect
- Bélgica Castro, actress
- Francisco Dall'Anese, Attorney-General of Costa Rica
- Eduardo Doryan, government official
- Lola Fernández, artist
- Helio Gallardo, philosopher
- Mirta González Suárez, emeritus professor of psychology
- Virginia Grutter, writer
- Dora Emilia Mora de Retana, botanist
- Alejandra Mora Mora, lawyer
- Alice L. Pérez Sánchez, former Vice-Dean of Research
- Montserrat Sagot, sociologist
