= Joint Social Welfare Institute =

Welfare organisation in Costa Rica

The Joint Social Welfare Institute (Spanish: Instituto Mixto de Ayuda Social) (IMAS) is an autonomous institution with legal status in Costa Rica for welfare. It was created under Act 4760 of April 30, 1971, which put it into operation from May 8 of that year. Its purpose is to serve the populations suffering the most from poverty in Costa Rica through the distribution of resources and institutional programs to improve their well-being.

The institute uses the Social Information Sheet (Ficha de Información Social) (FIS) to conduct research and evaluate the population living in poverty. The FIS contains a set of fifty-six variables grouped into 10 sections.

== Notable people ==
- Silvia Lara Povedano (born 1959), president of the IMAS during the administration of Abel Pacheco
- Carlos Alvarado Quesada (born 1980), executive chairman of IMAS in 2014
