= 1882 Costa Rican general election =

- 15–17 June 1882 (popular vote); 9 July 1882 (electoral college)
- Presidential election

363 members of the Electoral College 182 votes needed to win
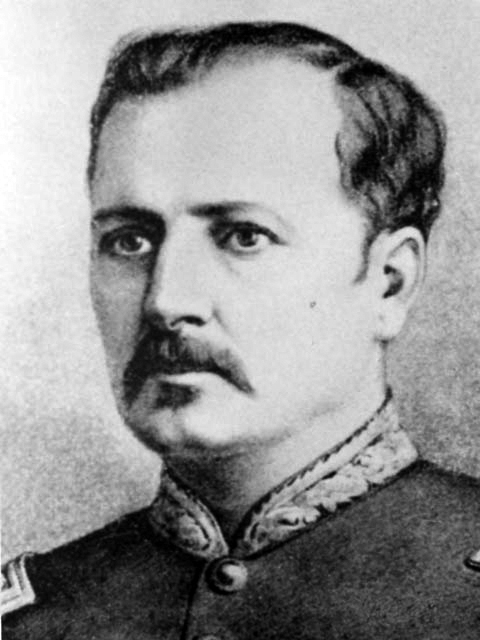
Nominee	Próspero Fernández Oreamuno
Party	Independent
Electoral vote	359
Percentage	99.17%
President before election
Saturnino Lizano Gutiérrez
Independent
Elected President
Próspero Fernández Oreamuno
Independent
- Legislative election
- All 22 seats in the Constitutional Congress; 12 seats needed for a majority
Party	Seats	+/–
Independent	22	+22
This lists parties that won seats. See the complete results below.
Results by province

General elections were held in Costa Rica on 15–17 June 1882 to elect the president and all members of the restored Constitutional Congress. They were the first national elections held since the 1876 coup d'état, which dissolved the legislature and inaugurated a period of authoritarian rule under President Tomás Guardia Gutiérrez.

The elections followed several years of de facto governments after Guardia overthrew the administration of President Aniceto Esquivel Sáenz in 1876. Guardia initially installed former Secretary of Interior Vicente Herrera Zeledón as president, although political authority remained largely in Guardia's hands. After Herrera resigned in 1877, citing health reasons, Guardia immediately resumed the presidency himself.

On 7 May 1882, suffering from a terminal illness, Guardia issued the decree restoring the 1871 Constitution, calling presidential and congressional elections. On 17 June, shortly before his death, he instructed First Designate Saturnino Lizano Gutiérrez to exercise executive power and appointed General Próspero Fernández Oreamuno as acting commander-in-chief of the army. Guardia died on 6 July 1882 at age 50 in Alajuela, after the first phase of the elections had been held but before the new administration took office, and Lizano succeeded him in the presidency.

Fernández, a freemason, liberal politician and career military officer associated with the Olympus Generation, was elected president with 99.2% of the electoral vote. Three electors voted for other candidates: one for former President José María Castro Madriz, one for former President Aniceto Esquivel Sáenz, and one for Joaquín Lizano Gutiérrez.

== Results ==
Candidate	Votes	%
Próspero Fernández Oreamuno	359	99.17
José María Castro Madriz	1	0.28
Aniceto Esquivel Sáenz	1	0.28
Joaquín Lizano Gutiérrez	1	0.28
Total	362	100.00
Registered voters/turnout	363	–
Source: TSE

=== By province ===
Province	Fernández
San José Province	109
Alajuela	78
Cartago Province	66
Heredia	50
Guanacaste	28
Puntarenas	14
Limón	14
Total	359
Source: Salazar
