= 1876 Costa Rican general election =

- 1–3 March 1876 (popular vote); 2 April 1876 (electoral college)
- Presidential election

322 members of the Electoral College 162 votes needed to win
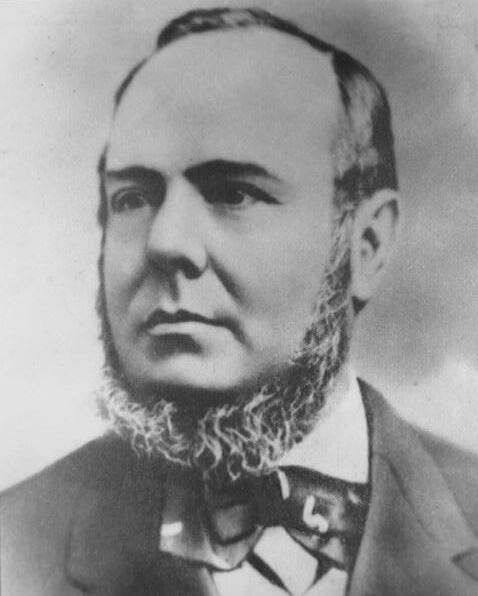
Nominee	Aniceto Esquivel Sáenz
Party	Independent
Electoral vote	322
Percentage	100%
President before election
Tomás Guardia Gutiérrez
Independent
Elected President
Aniceto Esquivel Sáenz
Independent
- Legislative election
- 13 of the 32 seats in the Constitutional Congress
Party	Seats	+/–
Independent	13	+13
This lists parties that won seats. See the complete results below.
Results by province

General elections were held in Costa Rica on 1–3 March 1876 to elect the president and half of the Constitutional Congress. Incumbent president Tomás Guardia was constitutionally ineligible to seek a second consecutive term and endorsed congressman Aniceto Esquivel as his successor.

Esquivel became the first head of state since the re-election of Juan Mora Fernández in 1829 to be elected unanimously, without any dissenting electoral votes.

== Background ==
The preceding general election had been the first held under the 1871 Constitution and resulted in the election of Tomás Guardia Gutiérrez, who had come to power in 1870 following a coup and initially governed as provisional president. Guardia’s administration marked the beginning of a period commonly known as the Liberal State, during which political elites implemented reforms grounded in liberal and modernizing principles. These reforms aimed to centralize political authority in San José and strengthen the concept of the nation-state. This political framework would persist for several decades, with the 1871 Constitution remaining formally in force for most of the period, until its replacement in 1917 during the Tinoco dictatorship.

As Guardia was constitutionally barred from seeking immediate re-election, he sought to ensure continuity by endorsing a successor he believed would remain loyal to his leadership, while he himself retained the position of commander-in-chief of the army. He selected Aniceto Esquivel Sáenz, a 52-year-old lawyer who had served as a deputy in the first Constitutional Congress and briefly as Secretary of Foreign Affairs between 1868 and 1869.

The election resulted in the selection of 13 deputies to the Constitutional Congress. Those elected were Manuel Antonio Bonilla Nava, Adolfo Bonilla Carrillo, Miguel Guardia Gutiérrez, and Andrés Sáenz Llorente from San José; Anselmo González Bonilla and Florentino Montenegro from Alajuela; Vicente Aguilar, Dionisio Bonilla y Peralta, Rafael Brenes, and Fulgencio Bonilla from Cartago; Blas Gutiérrez Uriza from Heredia; Juan Félix Fernández Salazar from Guanacaste; and Genaro Morales from Puntarenas. The election of Morales was deemed invalid as he had not reached the minimum age of 21 established by the Constitution.

Esquivel would not finish his period since that same year he would be overthrown by the brothers Pedro and Pablo Quirós Jiménez in conspiracy with Guardia who was dissatisfied with him. In his place was named the more lenient Vicente Herrera Zeledón, who was Guardia's puppet.

== Electoral system ==
The election was conducted under the electoral law of 20 June 1870. Under this framework, control of the electoral process was concentrated in the Executive Branch, particularly in the president and the Secretary of the Interior and Police. Provincial electoral boards were appointed by the executive and presided over by the respective provincial governors. These boards oversaw the vote count and appointed cantonal boards, which were chaired by the political chiefs and, in turn, designated district boards responsible for compiling voter registers.

The electoral process followed a two-stage system of indirect voting. In the first stage, eligible male citizens voted publicly to select second-degree electors. In the second stage, these electors chose the president by secret ballot. Eligibility to serve as an elector generally required property ownership and literacy, which meant that electors were drawn primarily from wealthier sectors and the middle class. For the 1876 election, a total of 348 electors were to be chosen nationwide, although 26 ultimately did not participate in the second round of voting.

The same body of electors also selected the deputies to the Constitutional Congress for four-year terms. Electoral assemblies were held in the capital city of each province and were presided over by the provincial governor, who was appointed by the president.

== Results ==
Candidate	Votes	%
Aniceto Esquivel Sáenz	322	100.00
Total	322	100.00
Registered voters/turnout	348	–
Source: TSE

=== Constitutional Congress ===
Party	Seats	
Party	Won	Total
Independent	13	32
Total	13	32
Source: Sáenz Carbonell

Constituency	Independent	
Constituency	%	Seats
San José		4
Alajuela		2
Cartago		4
Heredia		1
Guanacaste		1
Puntarenas		1
Total		13
Source: Álvares & Girón
