= Joaquín Lizano Gutiérrez =

Costa Rican businessman and politician (1829–1901)

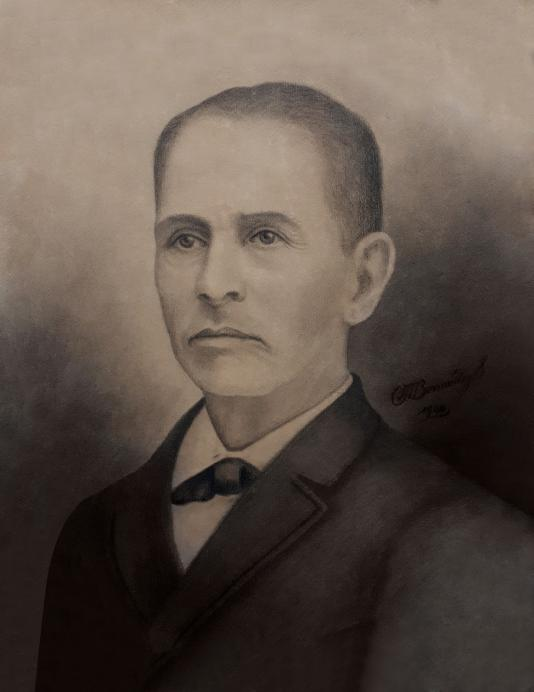

Third Designate to the Presidency
- In office 8 May 1890 – 8 May 1894
- President: José Joaquín Rodríguez Zeledón
- Preceded by: Carlos Durán Cartín
- Succeeded by: Ascensión Esquivel Ibarra

Second Designate to the Presidency
- In office 8 May 1875 – 8 May 1876
- President: Tomás Guardia Gutiérrez
- Preceded by: Rafael Barroeta Baca
- Succeeded by: Tomás Guardia Gutiérrez

Secretary of Finance and Commerce
- In office 31 July 1876 – 9 October 1877
- President: Vicente Herrera Zeledón; Tomás Guardia Gutiérrez
- Preceded by: Braulio Morales Cervantes
- Succeeded by: Salvador Lara Zamora

Personal details
- Born: Joaquín de Jesús Lizano Gutiérrez; 1 January 1829 Heredia, Costa Rica, Federal Republic of Central America
- Died: 28 May 1901 (aged 72) Heredia, Costa Rica
- Party: Independent
- Spouse: Matilde Ulloa Solares (m. 1859)
- Children: 13
- Relatives: Saturnino Lizano Gutiérrez (brother); Juan José Ulloa Solares (brother-in-law)
- Profession: Businessman; politician

Joaquín de Jesús Lizano Gutiérrez (1 January 1829 – 28 May 1901) was a Costa Rican businessman and politician who served as Second Designate to the Presidency from 1875 to 1876 and Third Designate from 1890 to 1894. He also served as acting President of Costa Rica from 28 May to 4 November 1875 during the temporary absence of President Tomás Guardia Gutiérrez.

== Early life and career ==
Lizano was born in Heredia on 1 January 1829, the son of José Dámaso Lizano Avendaño and Dámasa Gutiérrez Flores. In 1859, he married Matilde Ulloa Solares, daughter of politician José Nicolás Ulloa Soto, and they had thirteen children.

Early in his career, he served as sacristan of the church in Esparza and later worked as a schoolteacher in Guanacaste. He subsequently entered public service as Secretary of Administration for the province of Guanacaste.

== Public career ==
Lizano served as a deputy and senator during several legislative terms between 1860 and 1895. He was also a member of the Constituent Assemblies of 1859, 1869, and 1880. He served as a councilman in Puntarenas in 1858 and was appointed Governor of Heredia in 1867 during the administration of President José María Castro Madriz.

In 1870, Lizano participated in the movement that overthrew President Jesús Jiménez Zamora. Following the establishment of the provisional government of Bruno Carranza Ramírez, he was appointed Secretary of State. Later that year, he was a candidate for the provisional presidency before the National Convention, narrowly losing to Colonel Tomás Guardia Gutiérrez by two votes. After the vote, he was appointed Secretary of Finance and Commerce.

In 1875, the Constitutional Congress elected Lizano as Second Designate to the Presidency. During President Guardia's absence from the country, he served as acting president from 28 May to 4 November 1875. The following year, he was elected to the Council of State as the representative for Heredia. He returned to the Finance and Commerce portfolio on July 1876 under provisional president Vicente Herrera Zeledón.

During the administration of President José Joaquín Rodríguez Zeledón, Lizano served as Secretary of the Interior, Police and Public Works. In 1890, he was elected Third Designate to the Presidency for the 1890–1894 constitutional term. Lizano died in Heredia on 28 May 1901 at the age of 72.
