= Braulio Morales Cervantes =

Costa Rican businessman and politician (1824–1898)

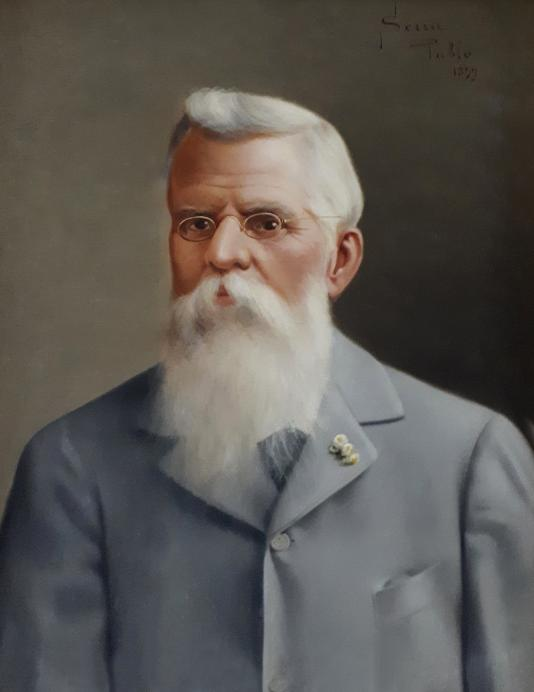

Second Designate to the Presidency
- In office 11 May 1876 – 30 July 1876
- President: Aniceto Esquivel Sáenz
- Preceded by: Rafael Barroeta Baca
- Succeeded by: Manuel Antonio Bonilla Nava

Secretary of Finance and Commerce
- In office 4 January 1876 – 30 July 1876
- President: Tomás Guardia Gutiérrez; Aniceto Esquivel Sáenz
- Preceded by: Joaquín Lizano Gutiérrez
- Succeeded by: Joaquín Lizano Gutiérrez

Governor of Heredia
- In office 8 May 1866 – 17 December 1868
- President: José María Castro Madriz; Jesús Jiménez Zamora
- Preceded by: Saturnino Trejos Gutiérrez
- Succeeded by: José Gregorio Trejos Gutiérrez

Member of the Chamber of Representatives
- In office 1 May 1860 – 30 April 1863
- Constituency: Heredia

Personal details
- Born: Braulio de las Mercedes Morales Cervantes; 20 March 1824 Heredia, Costa Rica, Federal Republic of Central America
- Died: 8 July 1898 (aged 74) London, United Kingdom
- Party: Independent
- Spouse: Joséfa Gutiérrez Flóres (m. 1850)
- Children: 18
- Profession: Businessman; politician

Braulio de las Mercedes Morales Cervantes (20 March 1824 – 8 July 1898) was a Costa Rican businessman and politician who served as Second Designate to the Presidency from May to July 1876. He also held cabinet positions, including Secretary of Finance and Commerce, and was active in municipal government and commercial affairs in Heredia.

== Early life and education ==
Morales was born in Heredia on 20 March 1824, the son of José Estanislao Morales and Mariana Cervantes Paniagua. He completed his primary education at the Municipal School of Heredia before studying at the Colegio del Padre Paul and the University of Santo Tomás.

Morales married Esmeralda Gutiérrez Flores (1835–1924), a sister of Manuel María Gutiérrez Flores, composer of the Costa Rican national anthem. Among their children was Delia Morales Gutiérrez, who married future President Alfredo González Flores in 1922.

== Public career ==
From an early age, Morales devoted himself to commerce, coffee cultivation, and agriculture. He was associated with the commercial firm of Ricardo Brealey and later became a shareholder in the Bank of Costa Rica and administrator of the Bank of Issue and Credit in 1876.

His public career began in municipal government. He served as City Attorney (Procurador Síndico) of Heredia in 1851 and was elected to the municipal council on several occasions. He served as an alternate deputy for Alajuela in Congress from 1855 to 1859 and for Heredia from 1858 until the 1859 coup. He was subsequently elected to the Constituent Assembly of 1859 for his native province, and served as Governor of Heredia during the second administration of President José María Castro Madriz (1866–1868).

Morales participated in a number of civic and charitable initiatives in Heredia. He was a member of the Economic Board established to oversee the reconstruction of the parish church following the 1851 earthquake, contributed to the Filibuster War of 1856–1857, and supported projects including the establishment of the city's public library, Heredia Hospital, educational institutions, and public parks. He was also a member of the Friends Center (Centro de Amigos), founded in 1866, and later served on the board of the El Grito de Yara Club, an organization established in 1895 to support the Cuban independence movement.

In government, Morales served as Secretary of Finance and Commerce in 1874 and again in January 1876, and later held responsibility for the Interior and Police portfolio. In May 1876, the Constitutional Congress elected him Second Designate to the Presidency in replacement of Vicente Herrera Zeledón, who had rejected the office. He also acted as an adviser to President Tomás Guardia Gutiérrez on financial and commercial matters.

Morales travelled to Europe on several occasions. He died in London on 8 July 1898, and his remains were returned to Costa Rica for burial in Heredia the following month. A public elementary school in Heredia was later named in his honor.
