= Fernando Esquivel Bonilla =

Costa Rican businessman and politician (1898–1992)

Second Vice President of Costa Rica
- In office 8 November 1953 – 8 May 1958 Serving with Raúl Blanco Cervantes
- President: José Figueres Ferrer
- Preceded by: Alfredo Volio Mata
- Succeeded by: José Joaquín Peralta Esquivel

Personal details
- Born: Fernando Esquivel Bonilla; 14 August 1898 San José, Costa Rica
- Died: 18 April 1992 (aged 93) San José, Costa Rica
- Spouse: Cristina Goicoechea Quirós (m. 1929)
- Children: 6
- Relatives: Aniceto Esquivel Sáenz (grandfather); René Picado Michalski (brother-in-law)
- Occupation: Businessman; politician; landowner

Fernando Esquivel Bonilla (14 August 1898 – 18 April 1992) was a Costa Rican businessman, landowner, and politician who served as Second Vice President of Costa Rica from 1953 to 1958. A member and co-founder of the National Liberation Party, he was one of the country's leading coffee producers and a grandson of former president Aniceto Esquivel Sáenz.

Esquivel was born in San José on 14 August 1898 to Roberto Esquivel Carazo and Arabela Bonilla Mora. In 1929, he married María Cristina "Maruja" Goicoechea Quirós. The couple had six children, one of whom died in childhood.

Esquivel was active in Costa Rica's coffee sector and acquired prominence as an agricultural entrepreneur. He was among the signatories of the charter establishing the National Liberation Party in 1951. In 1953, Esquivel was elected Second Vice President of Costa Rica, serving under President José Figueres Ferrer until 1958. During his term, he temporarily exercised executive authority on two occasions, from 16 February to 5 March 1956 and from 20 to 24 July 1956.

Esquivel was also connected to several prominent political families. His sister, María del Rosario Esquivel Bonilla, married politician René Picado Michalski in 1930. He died on 18 April 1992 at the age of 93.
