= Pedro Quirós Jiménez =

Costa Rican military officer and politician (1819–1883)

General Pedro Quirós Jiménez
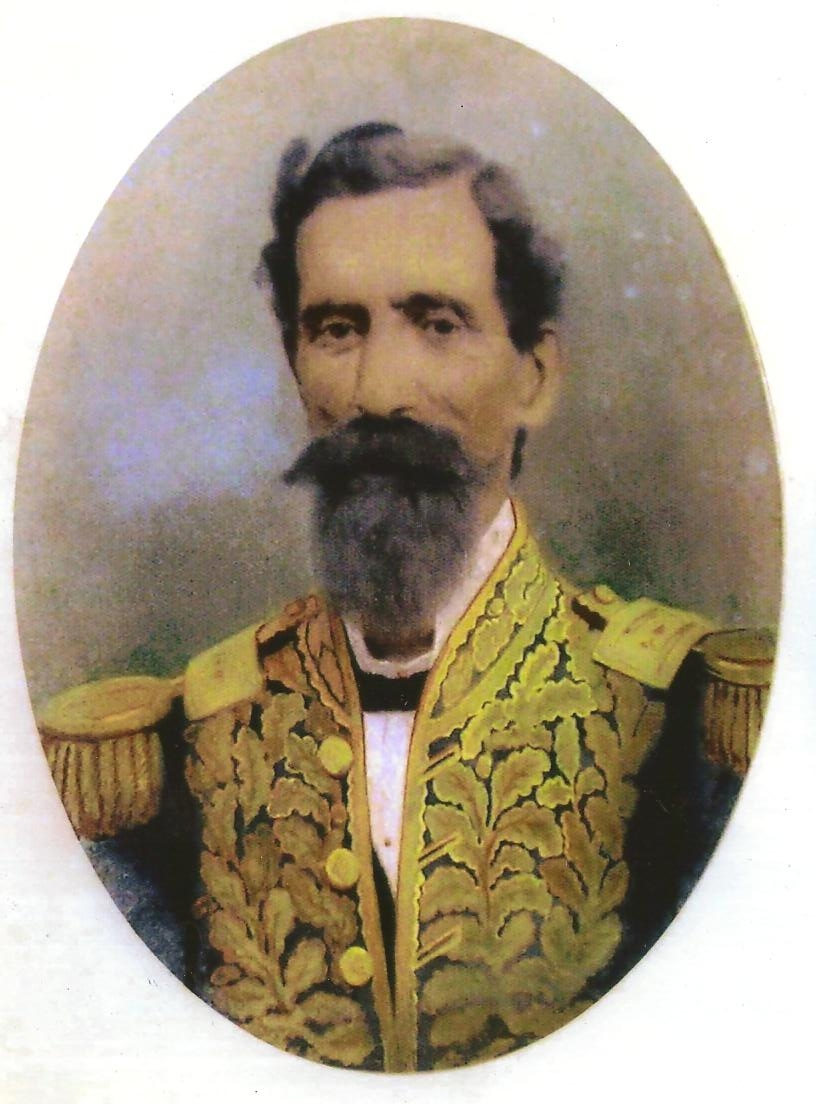
- Portrait by Aquiles Bigot

Fifth Designate to the Presidency
- In office 23 April 1881 – 10 August 1882
- President: Tomás Guardia Gutiérrez; Saturnino Lizano Gutiérrez
- Preceded by: Office established
- Succeeded by: Office abolished

First Designate to the Presidency
- In office 19 October 1877 – 23 April 1881
- President: Tomás Guardia Gutiérrez
- Preceded by: Tomás Guardia Gutiérrez
- Succeeded by: Saturnino Lizano Gutiérrez

Personal details
- Born: Pedro de Jesus Quirós Jiménez; 1 August 1819 San José, Captaincy General of Guatemala, Spanish Empire
- Died: 1 May 1883 (aged 63) San José, Costa Rica
- Party: Independent

Pedro de Jesus Quirós Jiménez (1 August 1819 – 1 May 1883) was a Costa Rican military officer, landowner, and politician who served as First Designate to the Presidency from 1877 to 1881. He participated in the Central American campaign against William Walker's filibusters in 1856–1857 and, together with his brother Pablo Quirós Jiménez, attained the rank of general in the Costa Rican Army.

== Biography ==
Quirós was born in San José on 1 August 1819.

He married Bernarda Marín Segura (1822–1854), with whom he had several children. Following her death, he married María Josefa Aguilar Castro (1829–1885) on 8 September 1856 in San Juan de Tibás. Among his descendants were President José Joaquín Trejos Fernández, President Daniel Oduber Quirós, and Archbishop Carlos Humberto Rodríguez Quirós.

Quirós served in the Costa Rican Army during the campaign against William Walker and his filibusters in 1856 and 1857. He later rose to the rank of general.

On 27 April 1870, Quirós participated in the coup d'état that overthrew President Jesús Jiménez Zamora. Acting alongside Colonel Tomás Guardia Gutiérrez and other military officers, including his brother Pablo Quirós Jiménez and his son Eliseo Quirós Marín, he took part in the capture of the San José Artillery Barracks.

Pedro and Pablo Quirós subsequently commanded the two principal military garrisons in the capital. Pedro commanded the Artillery Barracks, while Pablo commanded the Main Barracks of San José. On 30 July 1876, the brothers were among the military officers who signed the Act of Non-Recognition of President Aniceto Esquivel Sáenz, supporting the installation of Vicente Herrera Zeledón as head of state.

From 1877 to 1881, Quirós served as First Designate to the Presidency under Guardia, and as Fifth Designate from 1881 to 1882. He died on 1 May 1883 at the age of 63.
