= Rafael Barroeta Baca =

Costa Rican lawyer and politician (1898–1880)

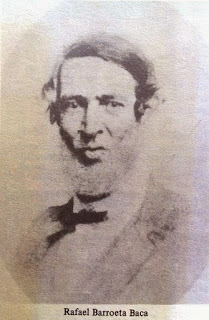

First Designate to the Presidency
- In office 8 May 1874 – 8 May 1875
- President: Tomás Guardia Gutiérrez
- Preceded by: Salvador González Ramírez
- Succeeded by: Joaquín Lizano Gutiérrez
- In office 27 April 1870 – 8 May 1872
- President: Bruno Carranza Ramírez; Tomás Guardia Gutiérrez
- Preceded by: Eusebio Figueroa Oreamuno
- Succeeded by: José Antonio Pinto Castro

Second Designate to the Presidency
- In office 8 May 1872 – 8 May 1873
- President: Tomás Guardia Gutiérrez
- Preceded by: José Antonio Pinto Castro
- Succeeded by: Vicente Herrera Zeledón

Deputy of the Constitutional Congress
- In office 1 May 1872 – 30 April 1874
- Constituency: San José Province

Deputy of the Congress of the Republic
- In office 1 May 1863 – 1 November 1868
- Constituency: San José Province
- In office 1 May 1858 – 14 August 1859
- Constituency: Alajuela Province
- In office 1 May 1849 – 30 April 1852
- Constituency: Alajuela Province

Personal details
- Born: Rafael Barroeta Baca; 1798 Cartago, Captaincy General of Guatemala, Spanish Empire
- Died: 1880 (aged 81–82) Esparza, Costa Rica
- Party: Independent

Rafael Barroeta Baca (1798 – 1880) was a Costa Rican lawyer, philanthropist and politician who served as First Designate to the Presidency from 1870 to 1872 and again from 1874 to 1875. He also served as a deputy to Congress, magistrate of the Supreme Court of Justice, and acting Secretary of Public Works. He is chiefly remembered for establishing the Barroeta Foundation, a scholarship fund created through his will.

== Biography ==
Barroeta was born in Cartago in 1798, the son of Rafael Barroeta y Castilla, a prominent lawyer and politician, and Bárbara Baca Palacios. He married twice: first to Rosario de la Guardia y Robles, an aunt of President Tomás Guardia Gutiérrez, and later to Trinidad Gutiérrez y Peñamonje. From his first marriage he had an only daughter, María Justina Barroeta y Guardia, who was born on 26 September 1838 and died in San José on 20 August 1840.

He pursued a legal career and held several judicial offices, serving as a judge, prosecutor, and magistrate of the Supreme Court of Justice from 1846 to 1849. He also briefly served as acting Secretary of Public Works. As a legislator, he represented Cartago in the Congress during the terms 1849–1852, 1858–1859, 1863–1868, and 1872–1874.

In 1870, Barroeta was appointed as First Designate to the Presidency by decree, retaining the office by election of the Constitutional Congress under the 1871 Constitution. He served until 1872, and from 1874 to 1875.

Outside public life, Barroeta amassed a considerable fortune through agriculture and livestock. He owned extensive estates in Alajuela and Guanacaste, including coffee, cacao, and sugar plantations, as well as cattle ranches. Barroeta died in Esparza on 23 June 1880.

== Barroeta Foundation ==
In the fifth clause of his will, Barroeta directed that 100,000 pesos deposited in a bank be used to establish a permanent scholarship fund for academically distinguished young people. Preference was also given to applicants who could demonstrate kinship with Barroeta or either of his wives.

The Barroeta Foundation, formally established in 1883, awarded beneficiaries a monthly stipend and, upon reaching the age of twenty-five, the accumulated principal and interest to help them begin their professional careers. The foundation was administered according to the strict provisions of Barroeta's will, and because the scholarship amount was never adjusted for inflation, its payments gradually became insignificant. The foundation ultimately ceased operations in 1894.

Barroeta's philanthropic legacy has received relatively little scholarly attention. One of the few works devoted specifically to the foundation is Jorge Murillo Chaves' La Institución Barroeta (1969).
