= Rafael Calderón Muñoz =

Costa Rican physician and politician (1869–1943)

First Designate to the Presidency
- In office 8 May 1940 – 15 June 1943
- President: Rafael Ángel Calderón Guardia
- Preceded by: Carlos Pupo Pérez
- Succeeded by: Teodoro Picado Michalski

President of the Constitutional Congress
- In office 1 May 1931 – 30 April 1932
- Preceded by: Óscar Rohrmoser Carranza
- Succeeded by: Arturo Volio Jiménez

Deputy of the Constitutional Congress
- In office 1 May 1942 – 15 June 1943
- Constituency: San José Province
- In office 1 May 1930 – 30 April 1934
- Constituency: San José Province
- In office 1 May 1912 – 30 April 1916
- Constituency: San José Province

Personal details
- Born: José María Vicente Esteban Rafael de Jesús Calderón Muñoz; 24 October 1869 San José, Costa Rica
- Died: 15 June 1943 (aged 73) San José, Costa Rica
- Party: PRN

José María Vicente Esteban Rafael de Jesús Calderón Muñoz, known as Rafael Calderón Muñoz (24 October 1869 – 15 June 1943) was a Costa Rican politician and physician. He is cited as "one of the leaders of a circle of Catholic politicians with social concerns". Calderón Muñoz was vice president from 1940 until his death.

== Biography ==
Born in San José, Costa Rica to Adolfo Calderón Calderón and María Muñoz y Vargas, he graduated in medicine, surgery and obstetrics at the Catholic University of Leuven, east of Brussels. Calderón Muñoz became a member of the Constituent Assembly in 1917. He was a member of the Senate and Consul of Costa Rica in Belgium. He was elected to the Constitutional Congress in 1930, and reelected ten years later. He was President of the First Legislature from 1918–1919, and 1931–1932.

Calderón Muñoz held numerous administrative positions, including superintendent of Hospital San Juan de Dios and president of National Bank Insurance.

Married to Ana María, they were the parents of President Rafael Ángel Calderón Guardia, in 1940, Calderón Muñoz became one of the vice presidents of the country along with Teodoro Picado Michalski, Jorge Hine Saborío and Francisco Calderón Guardia, which he held until his death in 1943.
