= Apolinar de Jesús Soto Quesada =

Costa Rican military officer and politician (1827–1911)

Apolinar Soto Quesada

First Designate to the Presidency
- In office 8 May 1886 – 8 May 1890
- President: Bernardo Soto Alfaro
- Preceded by: Bernardo Soto Alfaro
- Succeeded by: Pánfilo Valverde Carranza

Second Designate to the Presidency
- In office 1885 – 8 May 1886
- President: Bernardo Soto Alfaro
- Preceded by: José María Castro Madriz
- Succeeded by: Ascensión Esquivel Ibarra

Personal details
- Born: 23 June 1827 Alajuela, Costa Rica, Federal Republic of Central America
- Died: 13 June 1911 (aged 83) Alajuela, Costa Rica
- Party: Independent
- Children: 5, including Bernardo and José María

Apolinar de Jesús Soto Quesada (23 July 1827 – 13 June 1911) was a Costa Rican military officer and politician who served as First Designate to the Presidency from 1886 to 1890.

He was born on 23 July 1827 in Alajuela, Costa Rica, to Bernardo Soto Herrera and Josefa Quesada González. He married Joaquina Alfaro Muñoz on 23 April 1849 in Alajuela, with whom he had ten children: Bernardo Soto Alfaro, President of the Republic from 1885 to 1890, and José María Soto Alfaro, presidential candidate in 1919.

He had three more children from a relationship with Mercedes Fernández Bonilla, daughter of Juan Mora Fernández's cousin: María Josefina Fernández Bonilla, Clemente Fernández Bonilla, and María Adelaida Fernández Bonilla.

He followed a career in the army and rose to the rank of General in the Costa Rican army. A supporter of President Tomás Guardia Gutiérrez, he was a member of the Consejo de Estado (Council of State) from 1880 to 1882. Subsequently, during the terms of his son Bernardo Soto Alfaro, on whom he exercised enormous influence, he held positions of great importance. He was Second Designate to the Presidency from 1885 to 1886, First Designate to the Presidency from 1886 to 1890, and Secretary of War and Navy from 1886 to 1887 and from 1888 to 1889.

In his native city he was called Tepezcuintle. He died in Alajuela, Costa Rica, on 13 June 1911.
