= Saturnino Lizano Gutiérrez =

President of Costa Rica in 1882

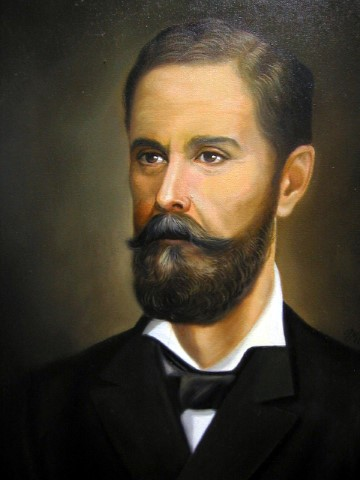
- Portrait by Aquiles Bigot

12th President of Costa Rica
- In office 6 July 1882 – 10 August 1882; Acting: 17 June – 6 July 1882
- Preceded by: Tomás Guardia Gutiérrez
- Succeeded by: Próspero Fernández Oreamuno

First Designate to the Presidency
- In office 23 April 1881 – 6 July 1882
- President: Tomás Guardia Gutiérrez
- Preceded by: Pedro Quirós Jiménez
- Succeeded by: Luis Diego Sáenz Carazo

Third Designate to the Presidency
- In office 30 July 1876 – 23 September 1877
- President: Vicente Herrera Zeledón
- Preceded by: Office established
- Succeeded by: José María Castro Madriz (1881)

Secretary of Foreign Affairs
- In office 30 July 1876 – 7 August 1876
- President: Vicente Herrera Zeledón
- Preceded by: Juan Rafael Mata Lafuente
- Succeeded by: Rafael Machado y Jáuregui

Deputy of the Constitutional Congress
- In office 1 May 1894 – 26 June 1894
- Constituency: Puntarenas Province

Alternate Deputy of the Constitutional Congress
- In office 1 May 1886 – 30 April 1890
- Constituency: Alajuela Province

Personal details
- Born: 29 November 1826 Esparza, Costa Rica, Federal Republic of Central America
- Died: 19 April 1905 (aged 78) San José, Costa Rica
- Party: Independent
- Other political affiliations: Catholic Union (1889–1894)
- Spouse: Angélica Guardia Solórzano (m. 1875)
- Children: 5
- Relatives: Tomás Guardia Gutiérrez (father-in-law); Próspero Fernández Oreamuno (uncle-in-law); Estrella Zeledón Lizano (great-granddaughter)
- Profession: Businessman; politician

Saturnino Lizano Gutiérrez (29 November 1826 – 19 April 1905) was a Costa Rican businessman and politician who served as the 12th President of Costa Rica from July to August 1882. He assumed the office in his capacity as First Designate to the Presidency following the death of President Tomás Guardia Gutiérrez due to illness. Throughout his political career, Lizano held various ministerial portfolios under the administrations of Aniceto Esquivel Sáenz, Vicente Herrera Zeledón, and Tomás Guardia, between 1876 and 1881. He also served as Governor of Puntarenas on four non-consecutive occasions between 1863 and 1900.

Following the death of Guardia, Lizano oversaw the 1882 general election, in which General Próspero Fernández Oreamuno, a cabinet member and the Seventh Designate to the Presidency, stood as the sole candidate. After the results were announced, and with Fernández enjoying the support of the armed forces, Lizano ceded power by appointing him Acting President on 20 July 1882, ahead of his formal inauguration on 10 August.

== Early life and family ==
Saturnino Lizano Gutiérrez was born on 29 November 1826 in Esparza, Puntarenas, Costa Rica. He was the son of Dámaso Lizano y Avendaño, a local mayor and schoolteacher, and Dámasa Gutiérrez y Flores, both originally from Heredia. Lizano was orphaned at a young age when both of his parents died simultaneously as a result of poisoning. Due to these early circumstances, he did not receive a formal education.

On 4 April 1875, Lizano married Angélica Guardia Solórzano, daughter of President Tomás Guardia Gutiérrez. The couple had two children: Gonzalo Lizano Guardia and María del Rosario Lizano Guardia.

Prior to his marriage, Lizano had a relationship with Procopia Casares y Moreno, with whom he had three sons: Francisco, Nicolás, and Benito Lizano Casares, all of whom he formally recognized. Notably, Nicolás Lizano Casares was the maternal grandfather of Estrella Zeledón Lizano, who later married Rodrigo Carazo Odio, President of Costa Rica from 1978 to 1982.

In 1874, Lizano was initiated into the Sincere Friendship Lodge of Costa Rican Freemasonry.

== Private activities ==
He was dedicated to agriculture and commerce, especially in the city of Puntarenas.

== Early political career (1863–1882) ==
Saturnino Lizano Gutiérrez began his political career on 5 October 1863, when he was appointed Governor of the Puntarenas Province (then shire) by President Jesús Jiménez Zamora at the age of 37. He assumed office three days later, on 8 October. During his tenure, he oversaw the construction of the first public bathing facilities in the port of Puntarenas and supported the reconstruction of the local parish church. He resigned from the governorship on 14 May 1866, with the resignation officially accepted on 21 May.

In 1868, Lizano served as a member of the Puntarenas electoral board, and in 1869, he was elected to represent the province in the House of Representatives. However, he did not assume the parliamentary seat. In 1870, he was elected as a delegate to the National Constituent Convention, which convened on 9 August. He was sworn in on 27 September, but the Assembly was dissolved shortly thereafter by President Tomás Guardia Gutiérrez on 10 October 1870.

Lizano briefly served again as interim governor of Puntarenas in 1870 and 1871 under the Guardia administration. On 2 September 1873, President Guardia reappointed him as Governor of Puntarenas. During this term, he implemented regulations for the San Lucas Island prison, signed a contract to provide medical services to the region, and confronted a revolutionary attempt led by Joaquín Eulogio Fernández Oreamuno in October 1874.

His first national-level ministerial appointment came on 8 May 1876, when the recently elected President Aniceto Esquivel Sáenz appointed him Secretary of State for War, Navy, Interior, Police, Agriculture, and Industry. He held this position until 30 July 1876, when Esquivel was overthrown. Following the change in government, President Vicente Herrera Zeledón appointed Lizano Secretary General of Government, overseeing all secretariats of state, and named him Third Designate to the Presidency in July 1876. Lizano resigned from the latter post in October 1877.

From 7 August 1876, he served as Secretary of the Interior, with oversight of the portfolios of Police, Public Works, War and Navy, Finance, Commerce, Agriculture, and Industry, a position he held until March 1877. On 7 April 1877, Lizano was appointed Financial Commissioner in Europe, tasked with negotiating Costa Rica's debt obligations related to railroad construction loans. While serving in this role, he traveled to Great Britain for negotiations and attended several major international events, including the wedding of King Alfonso XII of Spain to Mercedes of Orléans, the funeral of Pope Pius IX, and the enthronement of Pope Leo XIII. He returned to Costa Rica on 31 May 1878.

On 19 July 1880, President Guardia appointed him Secretary of the Interior, Police, Agriculture, and Industry, and temporarily assigned him responsibilities for the Ministry of War and Navy. Later, on 23 April 1881, he was appointed First Designate to the Presidency by Guardia. In that role, he was recalled to assume the presidency on 17 June 1882, due to the president's deteriorating health. During his interim administration, Lizano took actions to support Catholic missionary work led by Bishop Bernhard August Thiel and implemented measures for the protection of the Guatuso (Maleku) indigenous people.

== Presidency (1882) ==
In September 1877, Tomás Guardia Gutiérrez had returned to the presidency and established a military dictatorship, suspending the Constitution of 1871, which he had originally enacted, and halting both presidential and parliamentary elections. He ruled under these conditions until 1882, when he became seriously ill with tuberculosis. Prior to the deterioration of his health, Guardia reinstated the constitution with certain reforms, including the abolition of capital punishment.

As Guardia's health quickly worsened, Lizano –then serving as First Designate to the Presidency and Secretary of the Interior, Police, Worship and Charity– was called upon by decree to assume the presidency in an acting capacity. Upon Guardia's death on 6 July 1882, Lizano formally became President of the Republic. Lizano's administration was brief. The second round of the presidential election was held on 9 July 1882, resulting in a decisive victory for General Próspero Fernández Oreamuno, the Seventh Designate to the Presidency and commander-in-chief of the army. Fernández was scheduled to begin his constitutional term on 10 August 1882.

During Lizano's short tenure, several administrative measures were enacted. A state funeral was held for the late President Guardia with significant ceremony. Land grants were awarded to the municipalities of Alajuela, Heredia, and San José, and reforms were introduced to support public health as well as to amend the jury law.

On 20 July 1882, Lizano, without formally resigning, transferred executive authority to General Fernández, recognizing both his electoral victory and his control of the military. Fernández served as interim president until officially assuming the presidency on 10 August.

== Later posts ==
After his departure, he served as a substitute deputy for Alajuela from 1886 to 1890. He was later elected deputy for Puntarenas in the 1894 general election as a member of the Catholic Union Party, but resigned due to difficulties fulfilling his responsibilities in Puntarenas. He subsequently returned to serve as Governor of Puntarenas from 1894 to 1896, and again from 1898 to 1900.

== Death ==
He died in San José, Costa Rica on April 19, 1905. His portrait was hung on the Former Presidents Hall of the Legislative Assembly in 1996.

Political offices
Preceded by Tomás Guardia Gutiérrez	President of Costa Rica; 1882	Succeeded by Próspero Fernández Oreamuno
