= José Miguel Alfaro Rodríguez =

Costa Rican lawyer and politician (1940–2013)

Second Vice President of Costa Rica
- In office 8 May 1978 – 8 May 1982 Serving with Rodrigo Altmann Ortiz
- President: Rodrigo Carazo Odio
- Preceded by: Fernando Guzmán Mata
- Succeeded by: Armando Aráuz Aguilar

Minister of Economy, Industry and Commerce of Costa Rica
- In office 1 July 1980 – 8 May 1982
- President: Rodrigo Carazo Odio
- Preceded by: Fernando Altman Ortiz
- Succeeded by: Marco Lopez Aguero

Personal details
- Born: José Miguel Alfaro Rodríguez; 14 July 1940 San José, Costa Rica
- Died: 2 September 2013 (aged 73) San José, Costa Rica
- Party: Unity Coalition (1977–1983)
- Children: 2
- Education: University of Costa Rica (LLB)
- Occupation: Lawyer; politician; professor; consultant

José Miguel Alfaro Rodríguez (14 July 1940 – 2 September 2013) was a Costa Rican lawyer, academic and politician who served as Second Vice President of Costa Rica from 1978 to 1982 and as Minister of Economy, Industry and Commerce from 1980 to 1982. He was an Associate Justice of the Supreme Court from 1991 to 1995 and from 1997 to 2005. He was a law professor at the University of Costa Rica and a member of the University Council at the Distance State University (UNED) from 2007 to 2012.

He died from pancreatic cancer in 2013.
