= René Picado Michalski =

Costa Rican politician (1905–1956)

Second Designate to the Presidency
- In office 8 May 1944 – 8 May 1948
- President: Teodoro Picado Michalski; Santos León Herrera (acting)
- Preceded by: Jorge Hine Saborío
- Succeeded by: Office abolished

Secretary of Public Security
- In office 8 May 1944 – 19 April 1948
- President: Teodoro Picado Michalski
- Preceded by: Francisco Calderón Guardia
- Succeeded by: Miguel Brenes Gutiérrez

Personal details
- Born: René Picado Michalski; 28 December 1905 San José, Costa Rica
- Died: 12 July 1956 (aged 50) San José, Costa Rica
- Party: PRN
- Relatives: Teodoro Picado Michalski (brother)

René Picado Michalski (28 December 1905 – 12 July 1956) was a Costa Rican politician who served as Second Designate to the Presidency from 1944 to 1948. A brother of President Teodoro Picado Michalski, he also served as Secretary of Public Security.
