= Luis Diego Sáenz Carazo =

Costa Rican businessman and politician (1835–1895)

First Designate to the Presidency
- In office 10 August 1882 – 15 June 1883
- President: Próspero Fernández Oreamuno
- Preceded by: Saturnino Lizano Gutiérrez
- Succeeded by: Bernardo Soto Alfaro

Secretary of Finance and Commerce
- In office 10 August 1882 – 6 October 1882
- President: Próspero Fernández Oreamuno
- Succeeded by: Bernardo Soto Alfaro

Secretary of Foreign Affairs (Note: Simultaneously in charge of the portfolios of Public Instruction, Worship and Charity.)
- In office 1873 – 3 March 1874
- President: Tomás Guardia Gutiérrez
- Preceded by: Lorenzo Montúfar y Rivera
- Succeeded by: Vicente Herrera Zeledón (acting)

Personal details
- Born: 21 June 1835 Cartago, Costa Rica, Federal Republic of Central America
- Died: 8 April 1895 (aged 59) San José, Costa Rica
- Party: Independent
- Spouse: María Echeverría Alvarado (m. 1859)
- Children: 11
- Profession: Businessman; politician

Luis Diego Sáenz Carazo (21 June 1835 – 8 April 1895) was a Costa Rican businessman and politician who served as First Designate to the Presidency from 1882 to 1883. During his public career, he also held several cabinet posts, including Secretary of Foreign Affairs, Secretary of Public Works, and Secretary of Finance and Commerce.

== Biography ==
Sáenz Carazo was born in Cartago on 21 June 1835. He was the son of Diego María Sáenz y Ulloa and Micaela Carazo Bonilla, a sister of former Vice President Manuel José Carazo Bonilla. His business activities were primarily in commerce and agriculture. In 1859, he married María Brígida Echeverría Alvarado, with whom he had eleven children.

Sáenz was elected to the Constituent Assembly of 1871, where he served as Second Secretary. In 1873, he was appointed Costa Rican Minister to the United Kingdom before briefly serving as Secretary of Public Works. In 1873, he was appointed as Secretary of Foreign Affairs and related portfolios in the administration of President Tomás Guardia Gutiérrez, which he held until his resignation in March 1874.

He served as a member of the Council of State from 1880 to 1881 and again in 1882. Between 1881 and 1882, he returned as Secretary of Foreign Affairs and related portfolios, and in 1882 he also served as Secretary of Finance and Commerce.

In 1882, the Constitutional Congress elected Sáenz as First Designate to the Presidency for the 1882–1886 constitutional term. He resigned from the office in June 1883 following the bankruptcy of his business enterprises and was succeeded by Bernardo Soto Alfaro, who was elected by Congress to complete the remainder of the term.

Outside government, Sáenz served as president of the San José Charity Board from 1874 to 1875, honorary consul of Chile in Costa Rica from 1876 to 1878, and vice president of the National Bank of Costa Rica from 1881 to 1882.

Sáenz died in San José on 8 April 1895.
