= Armando Aráuz Aguilar =

Costa Rican lawywer politician (1922–2002)

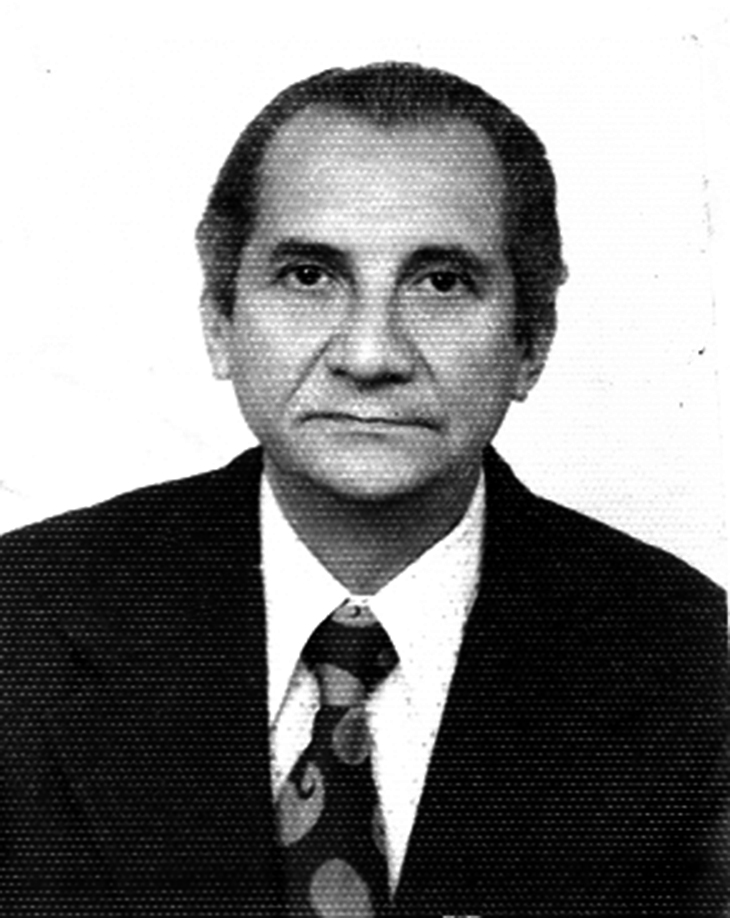

Second Vice President of Costa Rica
- In office 8 May 1982 – 8 May 1986 Serving with Alberto Fait Lizano
- President: Luis Alberto Monge
- Preceded by: José Miguel Alfaro Rodríguez
- Succeeded by: Victoria Garrón de Doryan

Deputy of the Legislative Assembly of Costa Rica
- In office 1 May 1978 – 30 April 1982
- Preceded by: Guillermo Villalobos Arce
- Succeeded by: Gerardo Mora Zúñiga
- Constituency: San José (10th Office)
- In office 1 May 1966 – 30 April 1970
- Preceded by: Danilo Flores Cárdenas
- Succeeded by: Rosa Aiza Carrillo
- Constituency: Guanacaste (1st Office)

Personal details
- Born: Armando Aráuz Aguilar; 22 January 1922 Nicoya, Costa Rica
- Died: 11 May 2002 (aged 80)
- Party: PLN
- Spouse: Ligia Cavallini Quiros
- Children: 3
- Education: University of Costa Rica (LLB)

Armando Aráuz Aguilar (26 January 1922 – 11 May 2002) was a Costa Rican lawyer and politician who served as Second Vice President of Costa Rica between 1982 and 1986, serving under president Luis Alberto Monge. A member of the National Liberation Party, he was previously a Deputy in the Legislative Assembly of Costa Rica between 1966 and 1970 and again between 1979 and 1982. He was a law professor at the University of Costa Rica. He died of a heart attack.
