= Fabio Baudrit González =

Costa Rican intellectual and politician (1875–1954)

First Designate to the Presidency
- In office 8 May 1928 – 8 May 1932
- President: Cleto González Víquez
- Preceded by: Carlos María Jiménez Ortiz
- Succeeded by: Carlos Pupo Pérez

Deputy of the Constitutional Congress
- In office 1 May 1908 – 30 April 1912
- Constituency: Heredia Province

Personal details
- Born: Fabio Baudrit González; 1878 Barva, Costa Rica
- Died: 1954 (aged 75–76) San José, Costa Rica
- Party: PUN

Fabio Baudrit González (1878 – 1954) was a Costa Rican lawyer, writer and politician who served as First Designate to the Presidency from 1928 to 1932. He also held several cabinet positions, including Secretary of the Interior and Secretary of Finance, and was a founding member of the Costa Rican Academy of Language.

== Biography ==
Baudrit was born in Barva in 1878, the son of Doroteo Baudrit Murillo and Adelaida González Víquez. He earned a law degree from the Costa Rican School of Law in 1902, where he later taught as a professor. He was a nephew of President Cleto González Víquez, with whom he practiced law. He served as a deputy in the Constitutional Congress from 1908 to 1912.

Baudrit was elected as member of the Constituent Assembly of 1917 and subsequently served as a senator representing Heredia during the dictatorship of Federico Tinoco Granados. He participated in the enactment of the Public Order Law (Law No. 7 of 2 August 1917), legislation that expanded the government's powers to restrict political opposition and freedom of expression. The law, popularly known as the Ley Baudrit ("Baudrit Law") or Ley Candado ("Lock Law"), established penalties for acts considered to undermine public confidence in the government and assigned jurisdiction over offenses under the law to police and political authorities rather than the ordinary courts.

Following the fall of the Tinoco regime, Baudrit continued his public career. He served as Secretary of the Interior and Secretary of Finance, was appointed Minister Plenipotentiary on a special mission to Panama in 1928, and was elected by Congress as First Designate to the Presidency for the 1928–1932 constitutional term. In 1931, he was awarded the Order of Merit of Ecuador.

In addition to his political career, Baudrit wrote short stories, essays, newspaper articles, and translations. He frequently wrote in various national magazines and newspapers under the pseudonyms "Chebo", "Chebito", "Nemo", "Un diputado poco iluso", "Tempel", "Fazes". A selection of his writings was published posthumously in 1956 under the title Cifra antológica de Fabio Baudrit González. In 1922, Baudrit was appointed a corresponding member of the Royal Spanish Academy. He was a founding member of the Costa Rican Academy of Language in 1923, occupying Seat H until his death, when he was succeeded by Arturo Agüero Chaves.
