= José María Castro Madriz =

President of Costa Rica (1847–1849; 1866–1868)

Founder of the Republic José María Castro Madriz LH
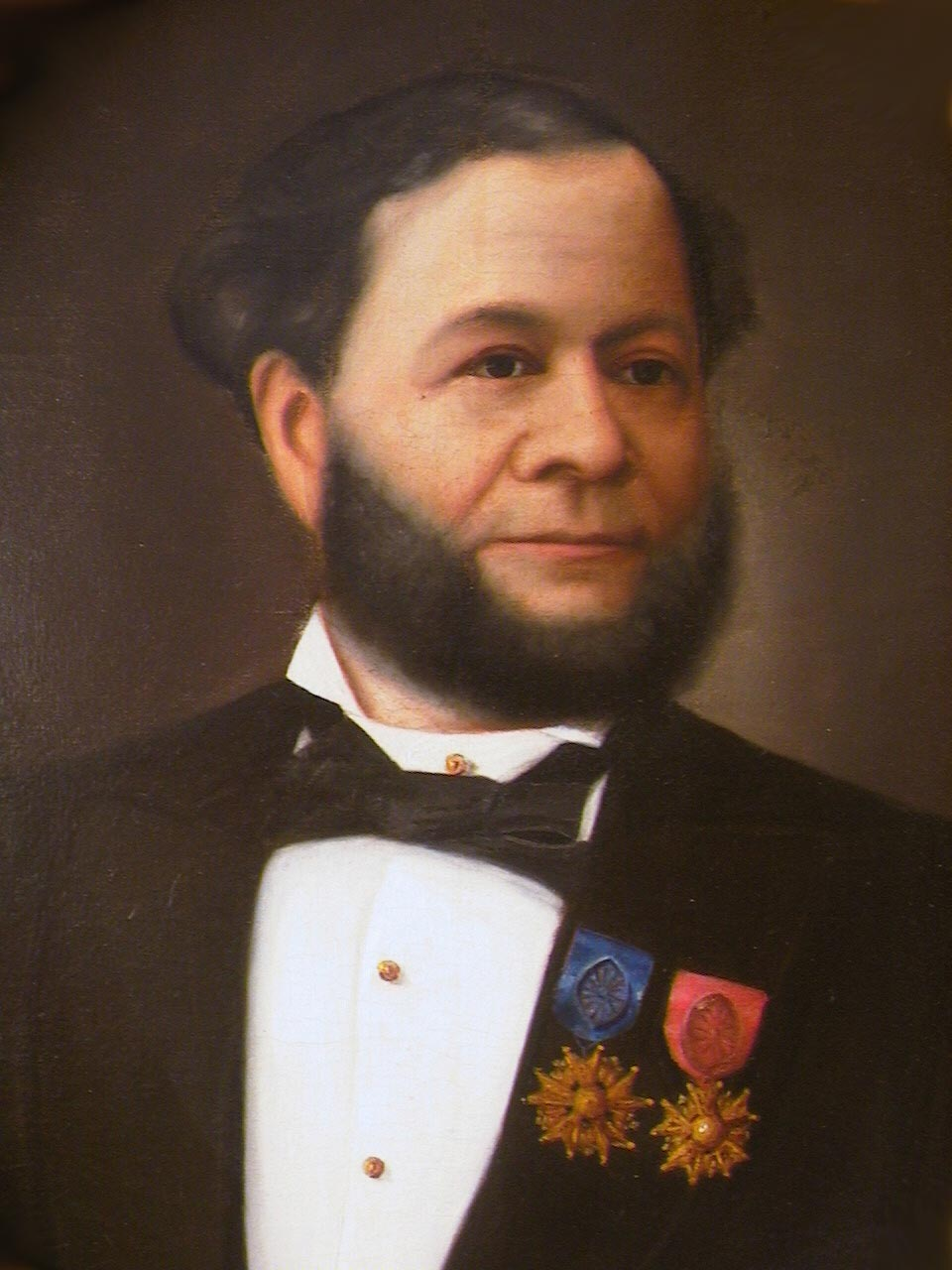
- Portrait by Aquiles Bigot

1st and 5th President of Costa Rica
- In office 8 May 1866 – 1 November 1868
- Preceded by: Jesús Jiménez Zamora
- Succeeded by: Jesús Jiménez Zamora
- In office 8 May 1847 – 16 November 1849
- Vice President: José María Alfaro Zamora; Juan Rafael Mora Porras; Manuel José Carazo Bonilla
- Preceded by: José María Alfaro Zamora
- Succeeded by: Miguel Mora Porras (Acting)

Second Designate to the Presidency
- In office 10 August 1882 – 11 May 1885
- President: Próspero Fernández Oreamuno; Bernardo Soto Alfaro
- Preceded by: Salvador Lara Zamora
- Succeeded by: Apolinar Soto Quesada

Third Designate to the Presidency
- In office 23 April 1881 – 10 August 1882
- President: Tomás Guardia Gutiérrez; Saturnino Lizano Gutiérrez
- Preceded by: Position established
- Succeeded by: José María Oreamuno y Oreamuno
Other positions
18th and 22nd President of the Supreme Court
In office 21 October 1870 – 25 November 1873
Preceded by	Juan José Ulloa Solares
Succeeded by	Vicente Sáenz Llorente
In office 29 April 1860 – 8 May 1866
Preceded by	Vicente Herrera Zeledón
Succeeded by	Manuel Alvarado y Barroeta
Secretary of Foreign Affairs
In office 16 August 1883 – 11 May 1885
President	Próspero Fernández Oreamuno; Bernardo Soto Alfaro
Preceded by	Eusebio Figueroa Oreamuno
Succeeded by	Ascensión Esquivel Ibarra
In office 8 October 1877 – 2 April 1883
President	Tomás Guardia Gutiérrez; Saturnino Lizano Gutiérrez; Próspero Fernández Oreamuno
Preceded by	Saturnino Lizano Gutiérrez
Succeeded by	Eusebio Figueroa Oreamuno
In office 25 November 1873 – 1 December 1873
President	Tomás Guardia Gutiérrez
Preceded by	Lorenzo Montúfar y Rivera
Succeeded by	Luis Diego Sáenz Carazo
In office 14 August 1859 – 17 August 1859
President	Juan Rafael Mora Porras
Preceded by	Nazario Toledo Murga
Succeeded by	Jesús Jiménez Zamora
In office 7 June 1846 – 8 May 1847
President	José María Alfaro Zamora
Preceded by	Joaquín Calvo Rosales
Succeeded by	Joaquín Calvo Rosales
In office 11 April 1844 – July 1844
President	José María Alfaro Zamora
Preceded by	Position established
Succeeded by	Joaquín Calvo Rosales
Vice President of Costa Rica (Note: As Vice Head of State from 16 September 1846 to 8 May 1847.)
In office 16 September 1846 – 8 May 1847
President	José María Alfaro Zamora
Preceded by	Francisco Oreamuno Bonilla
Succeeded by	Manuel Antonio Bonilla Nava
President of the House of Representatives
In office 3 March 1845 – 1 March 1846
Member of the House of Representatives for Desamparados
In office July 1844 – 1 March 1846

Personal details
- Born: 1 September 1818 San José, Captaincy General of Guatemala, Spanish Empire
- Died: 4 April 1892 (age 73) San José, Costa Rica
- Party: Independent
- Spouse: Pacífica Fernández Oreamuno (m. 1843; died 1885)
- Children: 13
- Parents: Ramón Castro y Ramírez; Lorenza Madriz Cervantes
- Relatives: António Pinto Soares (uncle-in-law); Próspero Fernández Oreamuno (brother-in-law); Minor Cooper Keith (son-in-law); Rafael Yglesias Castro (grandson)
- Education: National Autonomous University of Nicaragua at León (DCL, PhD)
- Occupation: Lawyer; philosopher; professor; politician; diplomat; writer
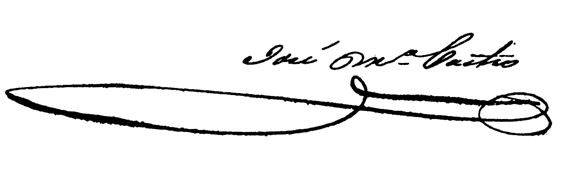
- Signature

José María Castro Madriz (1 September 1818 – 4 April 1892) was a Costa Rican intellectual and statesman who served as President of Costa Rica from 1847 to 1849 and from 1866 to 1868. Inaugurated at age 29, he was the youngest person to ever serve as President of Costa Rica. Over a public career spanning more than four decades, he held numerous offices of state and became the first person to preside over all three branches of the Costa Rican government.

He was indirectly elected president in 1847 and served until 1849 when he resigned under the threat of a coup. He was indirectly president again in 1866 and served 1868 when again he resigned under military pressure.

Ideologically a liberal, Castro was a strong believer in the principles of the Enlightenment and in freedom of the press. He pushed for reforms to strengthen democracy in Costa Rica. He was also a member of Freemasonry. Throughout his career, he advocated the abolition of the death penalty, antimilitarism, and free compulsory education.

On both occasions, Castro was prevented from completing his presidential term as a result of military coups. During his first presidency, on 31 August 1848, he proclaimed Costa Rica a sovereign republic, formally ending its remaining ties to the defunct Federal Republic of Central America. He also adopted the national tricolour flag designed by his wife, Pacífica Fernández.

== Life ==
Castro was born in San José. He was the son of Ramón Castro y Ramírez and Lorenza Madriz Cervantes. He was educated at the University of León in Nicaragua, where he graduated as bachelor of philosophy and doctor of law. He occupied many public offices throughout his life, both before and after serving as President. He was the rector of the national University (which he had helped to create) for sixteen years, and served several administrations as cabinet minister and ambassador. He also presided over the judiciary (as chief judge of the Supreme Court of Justice from 1860 to 1866 and from 1870 to 1873) and the legislature (as president of the Congress of Deputies in 1844-1845 and of the fourth Constitutional Convention in 1859), making him the only other Costa Rican besides Ricardo Jiménez to have headed all three branches of the government.

An active Freemason, Castro was consistently critical of the political influence of the Roman Catholic Church. He was also a strong defender of freedom of the press at a time when many Costa Rican governments practiced widespread censorship. His constitutional reform of 1848, however, established the most restricted suffrage that ever existed in independent Costa Rica. As president his lack of a committed political base made him an easy target for overthrow by the military. As the minister of foreign affairs, education, justice, public aid, and religious affairs, Castro was the most influential figure in the government of his brother-in-law, President Próspero Fernández (1882–1885), and he was largely responsible for the anti-clerical legislation adopted by that government.

He was married to Pacífica Fernández, who designed the 1848 version of the Costa Rican flag. His daughter Cristina Fernández Castro married Minor C. Keith in 1883. Their grandson, Rafael Yglesias Castro, served as President of Costa Rica from 1894 to 1902.

Inaugurated at age 29, he was the youngest person to ever serve as President of Costa Rica.

== Notes ==
Political offices
Preceded by José María Alfaro Zamora	President of Costa Rica; 1847–1849	Succeeded by Miguel Mora Porras
Preceded by Jesús Jiménez Zamora	President of Costa Rica; 1866–1868	Succeeded by Jesús Jiménez Zamora
