= Juan Bautista Quirós Segura =

President of Costa Rica in 1919

General Juan Bautista Quirós Segura
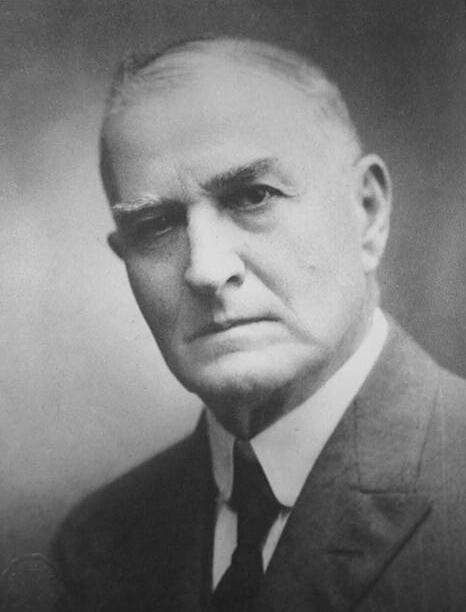

22nd President of Costa Rica
- In office 12 August 1919 – 2 September 1919; Acting: 12 – 19 August 1919
- Preceded by: Federico Tinoco Granados
- Succeeded by: Francisco Aguilar Barquero

First Designate to the Presidency
- In office 9 August 1919 – 12 August 1919
- President: Federico Tinoco Granados
- Preceded by: Joaquín Tinoco Granados
- Succeeded by: Andrés Venegas García
Other positions
Secretary of War and Navy
In office 2 September 1919 – 8 September 1919
President	Francisco Aguilar Barquero
Preceded by	Víctor Manuel Quirós Fonseca
Succeeded by	Aquiles Bonilla Gutiérrez
In office 8 December 1899 – 3 June 1901
President	Rafael Yglesias Castro
Preceded by	José Astúa Aguilar
Succeeded by	Demetrio Yglesias Castro (acting)
In office 8 May 1894 – 8 May 1898
President	Rafael Yglesias Castro
Preceded by	Rafael Yglesias Castro
Succeeded by	Demetrio Tinoco Iglesias
Secretary of Public Works
In office 28 January 1917 – 10 December 1917
President	Federico Tinoco Granados
Preceded by	Enrique Pinto Fernández
Succeeded by	Alejandro Aguilar Mora
President of the Constitutional Congress
In office 1 May 1908 – 30 April 1909
Preceded by	Federico Tinoco Iglesias
Succeeded by	Ricardo Jiménez Oreamuno
Deputy of the Constitutional Congress
In office 1 May 1908 – 30 April 1912
Constituency	San José Province
In office 1 May 1902 – 30 April 1906
Constituency	San José Province
Third Designate to the Presidency
In office 8 May 1902 – 8 May 1906
President	Ascensión Esquivel Ibarra
Preceded by	Federico Tinoco Iglesias
Succeeded by	José Astúa Aguilar
Second Designate to the Presidency
In office 8 May 1898 – 8 May 1902
President	Rafael Yglesias Castro
Preceded by	Carlos Durán Cartín
Succeeded by	Cleto González Víquez
Secretary of Finance and Commerce
In office 8 May 1898 – 3 June 1901
President	Rafael Yglesias Castro
Preceded by	Ricardo Montealegre
Succeeded by	Eloy Truque García (acting)

Personal details
- Born: Juan Bautista Quirós Segura; 18 January 1853 Tibás, San José, Costa Rica
- Died: 7 November 1934 (aged 81) San José, Costa Rica
- Party: Democratic (1919)
- Other political affiliations: Peliquista Party (1917–1919); Civil Party (Before 1917)
- Spouses: Teresa Aguilar Guzmán (m. 1883; died 1899) Clementina Quirós Fonseca (m. 1900)
- Children: 17
- Occupation: Military officer; politician; landowner; businessman

Juan Bautista Quirós Segura (18 January 1853 – 7 November 1934) was a Costa Rican military officer, businessman and politician who served as the 22nd President of Costa Rica from August to September 1919, following the resignation of Federico Tinoco Granados. His government was not recognized by the United States and he was forced to resign.

== Family and early life ==
Juan Bautista Quirós Segura was born in San Juan de Tibás, Costa Rica on January 18, 1853, to his parents General Pablo Quirós Jiménez and Mercedes Segura Masís. He first married Teresa Aguilar Guzmán (who died in 1899), granddaughter of then head of state Manuel Aguilar Chacón, and on November 4, 1900, he married Clementina Quirós Fonseca (1880–1953), daughter of José Quirós Montero and Florinda Fonseca Guzmán.

== Military and private activities ==
He pursued a military career and achieved the rank of General in the Costa Rican army. He was also a farmer and entrepreneur, and eventually earned a large capital.

== First public offices ==
During Rafael Yglesias Castro's second administration he was designated second in line to the presidency and secretary of commerce, war, and navy as well as treasurer.

He later served as deputy, third in line to the presidency, president of the Constitutional Congress, and president of the International Bank of Costa Rica. On August 19, 1919, President Federico Tinoco's fall seemed imminent, Congress named him first in line to the presidency. On August 12, President Tinoco asked him to temporarily hold the office. His first orders were to reestablish all public liberties and to free all political prisoners.

== Presidency (1919) ==
He officially took office on August 20, 1919, after Federico Tinoco's resignation was accepted. His period was scheduled to end on May 8, 1923, but, even though his government took a very prudent approach, the United States government refused to recognize him as a legitimate head of state. Being faced with a possible armed intervention, Quirós decided to quit the office and on September 20 was replaced by Francisco Aguilar Barquero.

== Other public offices ==
He was briefly secretary of war under President Aguilar. During Julio Acosta García's administration, and by Acosta's own recommendation, Congress designated him as the first head of the Control Office, which was in charge of government internal control.

He died in San José on November 7, 1934.

== Bibliography ==
- Jesús Manuel Fernández Morales, Las Presidencias del Castillo Azul (2010)
- Ernesto Quirós Aguilar, Los Quirós en Costa Rica (1948)

Political offices
Preceded by Federico Tinoco Granados	President of Costa Rica; 1919	Succeeded by Francisco Aguilar Barquero
