= Alberto Fait Lizano =

Costa Rican politician

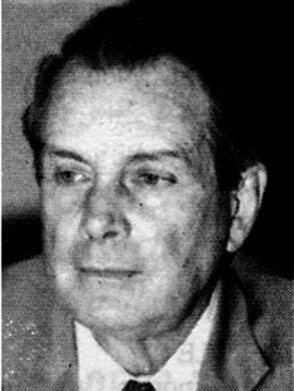

First Vice President of Costa Rica
- In office 8 May 1982 – 8 May 1986 Serving with Armando Aráuz Aguilar
- President: Luis Alberto Monge
- Preceded by: Rodrigo Altmann Ortiz
- Succeeded by: Jorge Manuel Dengo Obregón

Personal details
- Born: Alberto Fait Lizano; 1929
- Died: 2 June 1997 (aged 67–68)
- Party: PLN
- Spouse: Ana Teresa Pacheco
- Children: 5

Alberto Fait Lizano (1929 – 2 June 1997) was a Costa Rican politician who was First Vice President of Costa Rica between 1982 and 1986, serving under president Luis Alberto Monge. He was also a Deputy in the Legislative Assembly of Costa Rica between 1986 and 1990.
