= Andrés Venegas García =

Costa Rican lawyer and politician (1848–1939)

Third Designate to the Presidency
- In office 8 May 1928 – 8 May 1932
- President: Cleto González Víquez
- Preceded by: Felipe José Alvarado Echandi
- Succeeded by: León Cortés Castro

First Designate to the Presidency
- In office 2 September 1919 – 8 May 1920
- President: Francisco Aguilar Barquero
- Preceded by: Juan Bautista Quirós Segura
- Succeeded by: Aquiles Acosta García

Personal details
- Born: Andrés Venegas García; 30 November 1848 Puntarenas, Costa Rica
- Died: 9 November 1939 (aged 90) San José, Costa Rica
- Education: Universidad de San Carlos de Guatemala (LLB)

Andrés Venegas García (30 November 1848 – 9 November 1939) was a Costa Rican lawyer and politician who served as First Designate to the Presidency from 1919 to 1920 and as Third Designate from 1928 to 1932.

He graduated from the Universidad de San Carlos de Guatemala and became a member of the constituent assembly in 1880. Among other positions, he was an associate judge on the Supreme Court. He also served briefly as the foreign affairs minister from November 1919 to May 1920.
