= Próspero Fernández Oreamuno =

President of Costa Rica from 1882 to 1885

General Próspero Fernández Oreamuno
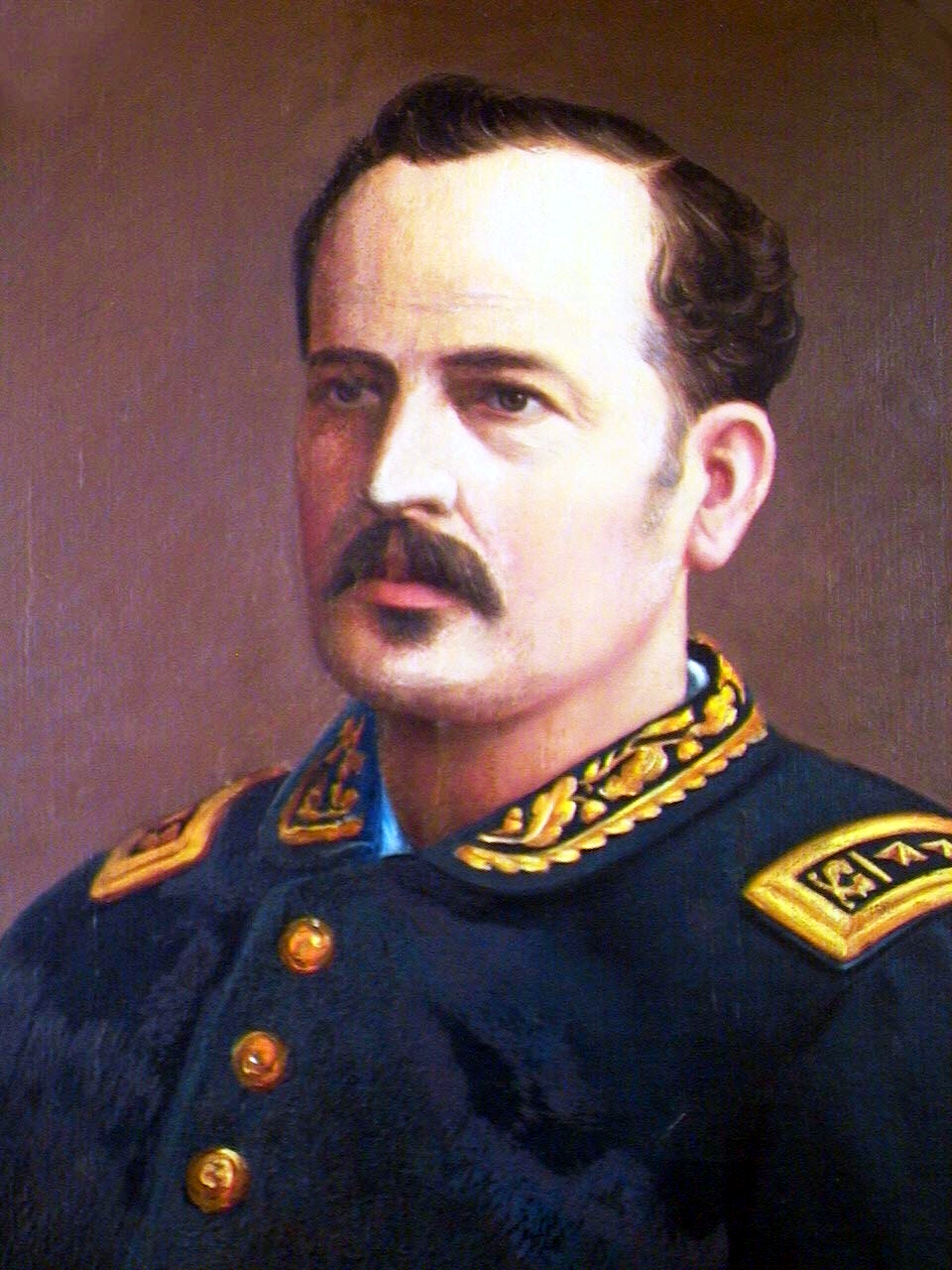

13th President of Costa Rica
- In office 10 August 1882 – 12 March 1885
- Preceded by: Saturnino Lizano Gutiérrez
- Succeeded by: Bernardo Soto Alfaro

Seventh Designate to the Presidency
- In office 23 April 1881 – 10 August 1882
- President: Tomás Guardia Gutiérrez; Saturnino Lizano Gutiérrez
- Preceded by: Office established
- Succeeded by: Office abolished

Personal details
- Born: Juan Primitivo Próspero Fernández Oreamuno; 18 July 1834 San José, Costa Rica, Federal Republic of Central America
- Died: 12 March 1885 (aged 50) Atenas, Costa Rica
- Party: Independent
- Spouse: Cristina Guardia Gutiérrez (m. 1861)
- Relations: Tomás Guardia Gutiérrez (brother-in-law); José María Castro Madriz (brother-in-law); Bernardo Soto Alfaro (son-in-law)
- Children: 2
- Education: Universidad de San Carlos de Guatemala (BA)

Juan Primitivo Próspero Fernández Oreamuno (18 July 1834 – 12 March 1885) was a Costa Rican military officer and politician who served as the 13th President of Costa Rica from 1882 until his death in 1885.

Fernández studied philosophy at the University of San Carlos of Guatemala before embarking on a military career. He fought in the war of 1856–1857 against William Walker and participated in the military coup that overthrew Jesús Jiménez in 1870. He was married to a sister of Tomás Guardia and under Guardia's government he was appointed commander of the Alajuela barracks and given the rank of Major General.

He was elected to succeed Guardia in 1882. As president he implemented measures that sought to undermine the power of the Roman Catholic Church. He withdrew the Concordat with the Holy See, expelled both the Jesuits and the bishop of Costa Rica from the country, and in 1884 passed laws that placed cemeteries under state control, introduced civil marriage, and legalized divorce. The most powerful figure within his government was his brother-in-law, former president José María Castro Madriz, who served as minister of foreign and religious affairs, education, justice, and public aid.

During his administration the state defaulted on its financial obligations to Minor C. Keith, who was building a railway to the Caribbean port of Limón. To compensate him, cabinet minister Bernardo Soto signed a deal that gave Keith 800,000 acres (3,200 km^{2}) of tax-free land along the railroad, plus a 99-year lease on the operation of the train route. Keith would later use those lands and his command of the railroad to build a powerful banana trading concern (see United Fruit Company).

President Fernández died in office shortly after declaring war on Guatemala which, under Gen. Justo Rufino Barrios, had embarked on the reunification of the dissolved United Provinces of Central America.

National Highway CR-27 connecting the capital city of San José with the Pacific coast's port of Caldera is named in his honor.

Political offices
Preceded by Saturnino Lizano Gutiérrez	President of Costa Rica; 1882-1885	Succeeded by Bernardo Soto Alfaro
