= Juan José Ulloa Solares =

Costa Rican politician (1827–1888)

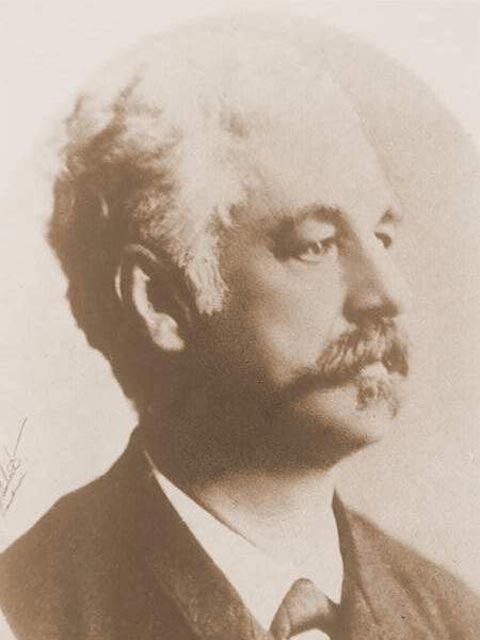
- Ulloa in 1869

21st President of the Supreme Court
- In office 7 May 1869 – 21 October 1870
- Preceded by: José Gregorio Trejos Gutiérrez
- Succeeded by: José María Castro Madriz

Second Designate to the Presidency
- In office 8 May 1864 – 8 May 1866
- President: Jesús Jiménez Zamora
- Preceded by: Aniceto Esquivel Sáenz
- Succeeded by: Aniceto Esquivel Sáenz

Secretary of Justice, Interior and Police
- In office 8 May 1863 – 8 May 1866
- President: Jesús Jiménez Zamora

Personal details
- Born: Juan José Ulloa Solares; 27 September 1827 Heredia, Costa Rica, Federal Republic of Central America
- Died: 23 June 1888 (aged 60) San José, Costa Rica
- Party: Independent
- Education: Universidad de San Carlos de Guatemala (BA)

Juan José Ulloa Solares (27 September 1827 – 23 June 1888) was a Costa Rican lawyer, judge and politician who served as the 21st President of the Supreme Court from 1869 to 1870.

Solares was born in Heredia, on September 27 1827. He was the son of Nicolás Ulloa Soto and Florencia Solares y Sandoval.

He graduated with a Bachelor of Philosophy from the University of Santo Tomás in 1845 and a Bachelor of Laws from the University of San Carlos de Guatemala in 1853.

He was Judge of First Instance in San José in 1855, diplomatic agent in Guatemala in 1856, Secretary of the Interior and related portfolios, Second Designated to the Presidency, Prosecutor of the Supreme Court of Justice of Costa Rica from 1866 to 1869 and President of the Assembly Constituent of 1869 .

On May 5th, 1869, the congress designated him the Regent of the Supreme Court of Justice, for the period 1869-1873, and on the 7th of that month he was sworn in.

Beginning in 1888, Solares was Acting Rector of the University of Santo Tomás.
