= Santos León Herrera =

Interim president of Costa Rica in 1948

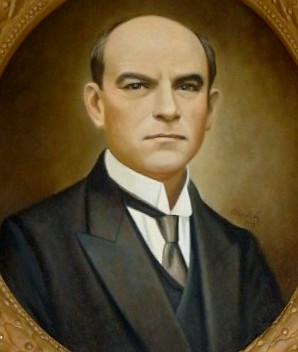

Interim President of Costa Rica
- In office 20 April 1948 – 8 May 1948
- Preceded by: Teodoro Picado Michalski
- Succeeded by: José Figueres Ferrer

Third Designate to the Presidency
- In office 8 May 1944 – 8 May 1948
- President: Teodoro Picado Michalski
- Preceded by: Francisco Calderón Guardia
- Succeeded by: Position abolished

Secretary of Interior and Police
- In office 8 May 1932 – 8 May 1936
- President: Ricardo Jiménez Oreamuno
- Preceded by: Fabio Baudrit González
- Succeeded by: Luis Fernández Rodríguez

Deputy of the Constitutional Congress
- In office 1 May 1926 – 30 April 1930
- Constituency: Cartago Province

Personal details
- Born: 21 May 1874 San José, Costa Rica
- Died: 8 May 1950 (aged 75) San José, Costa Rica
- Party: National Republican Party
- Spouse: Luisa Zavaleta Brenes (m. 1904)
- Children: 6

Santos León Herrera (21 May 1874 – 8 May 1950) was a Costa Rican engineer and politician who served as interim President of Costa Rica for 18 days during the country's 1948 civil war, serving from April 20 - May 8 of that year. He also previously served as vice president of the country, as part of the Teodoro Picado Michalski administration of 1944–1948. Before that, he served as interior minister from 1932–1936.

Political offices
Preceded by Teodoro Picado Michalski	President of Costa Rica; 1948	Succeeded by José Figueres Ferrer
