= Vice President of Costa Rica =

Second-highest constitutional office of Costa Rica

Vice Presidents of the Republic of Costa Rica
- Vicepresidentes de la República de Costa Rica
- Coat of arms of Costa Rica

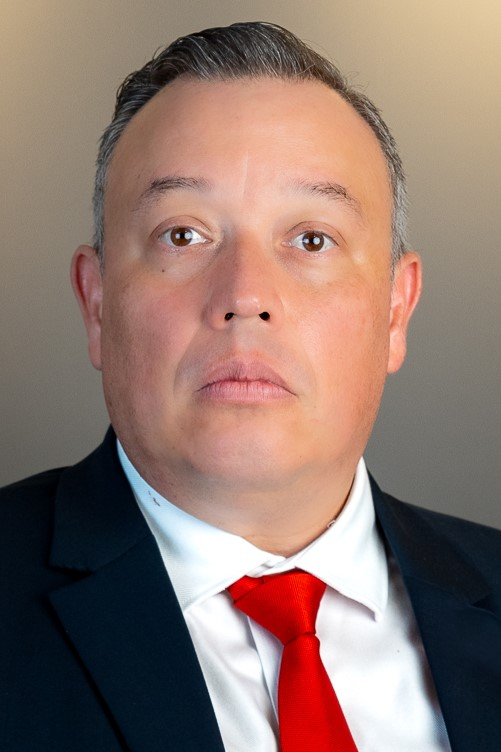
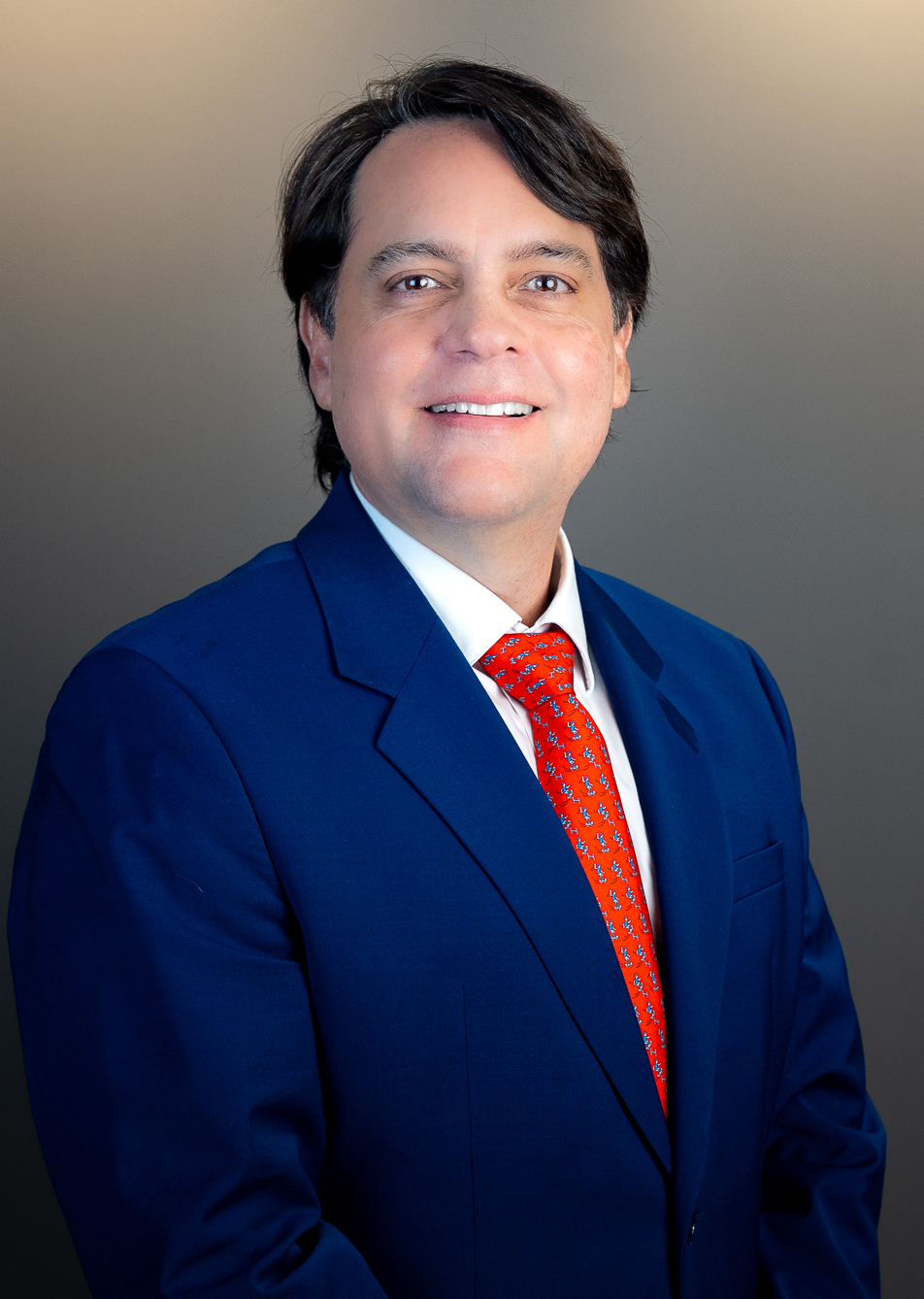
- Incumbent; Francisco Gamboa • Douglas Soto since 8 May 2026
- Term length: Four years term, renewable non-consecutively
- Inaugural holder: Alberto Oreamuno Flores
- Formation: 7 November 1949

The 1949 Constitution of Costa Rica established two vice presidencies of Costa Rica, which are directly elected through a popular vote on a ticket with the president for a period of four years, with no immediate re-election. There have been various incarnations of the office. Vice presidents replace the president in cases of temporary or permanent absence.

== History ==
Throughout the history of independent Costa Rica, there have been different systems to cover the temporary or permanent absence of a president. Several different names have been used for this position:

- From 1821 to 1824, the governing committee (junta) selected a vice-president.
- From 1824 to 1841 there was a vice-head-of-state who was popularly elected.
- From 1841 to 1842 there was a second-head-of-state, elected for life by popular vote.
- From 1842 to 1844 there was a vice-head-of-state selected by the Constitutional Assembly.
- From 1846 to 1847 there was a popularly elected vice-head-of-state.
- From 1847 to 1848 there was a vice-president of the state, elected by popular vote.
- From 1848 to 1859 there was a vice-president of the Republic, selected through popular election.
- From 1859 to 1949 there was a system of designates to the presidency, usually selected by the legislature.
- Since 1949 there have been two popularly elected vice presidents.

The following tables contain a list of the officials elected to the vice-presidential position since 1821.

== Role ==
In addition to succeeding to the Presidency and First Vice Presidency in the case of a vacancy or an inability to serve, Vice Presidents may be appointed to lead ministries in the cabinet.

== List ==
=== Vice Presidents of the Governing Committees of Costa Rica (1821–1824) ===
Between 1821 and 1824 Costa Rica was governed through a system of Governing Committees who chose from among their members a president and a vice-president.

Name	Title	Time in office	Notes
Nicolás Carillo y Aguirre	Vice-president of the Interim Governing Committee	1821–1822	
José Maria de Peralta y La Vega	Vice-president of the High Governing Committee	1822–1823	Acted as interim president on some occasions
José Francisco Madriz	Vice-president of the High Governing Committee	1 January – 20 March 1823	
Santiago de Bonilla y Laya-Bolívar	Vice-president of the Provincial Constitutional Congress	16–30 April 1823	Acted as interim president for some sessions
Manuel García-Escalante	Interim Vice-president of the Provincial Constitutional Congress	30 April – 6 May 1823	Acted as interim president for some sessions
Santiago de Bonilla y Laya-Bolívar	Vice-president of the Provincial Constitutional Congress	6–10 May 1823	
Eusebio Rodríguez y Castro	Vice-president of the High Governing Committee	1823–1824	
Alejo Aguilar	Vice-president of the High Governing Committee	8 January – 12 February 1824	
Eusebio Rodríguez y Castro	Vice-president of the High Governing Committee	12 February – 8 September 1824	

=== Vice-Heads-of-State of Costa Rica (1824–1841) ===
Between 1824 and 1841, in accordance with the Basic Law of 21 January 1825 and 1844, a Vice-Head-of-State was elected by the people.

Name	Time in Office	Notes
Mariano Montealegre Bustamante	1824–1825	Provisional
José Rafael de Gallegos y Alvarado	1825–1833	Elected 1825 and 1829; acted as interim head of state on a number of occasions
Manuel Fernández Chacón	1833–1837	Elected 1833; acted as interim head of state from June to July 1835
Juan Mora Fernández	1837–1838	Elected 1837, but his government was overthrown in 1838; acted as interim head of state on a number of occasions
Miguel Carranza Fernández	1838–1841	Filled term of office left by his predecessor

=== Second Heads of State (1841–1842) ===
In line with the Decree of Rules and Guarantees of 1841, a popularly elected Second-Head-of-State was created to replace the Head of State in case of temporary or permanent absence.

Name	Time in office	Notes
Manuel Antonio Bonilla Nava	1841–1842	Acted as interim president in 1842; his government was overthrown that year

=== Vice-Heads-of-State (1842–1844; 1846–1847) ===
From 1842 to 1844 and from 1846 to 1847 the country returned to the system of Vice-Heads-of-State.

Name	Time in Office	Notes
Juan Mora Fernández	1842	Provisional, elected by the Constitutional Assembly of 1842; his government was overthrown in 1842
Francisco María Oreamuno Bonilla	1843–1844	Provisional, elected by the Constitutional Assembly in 1843; replaced by a new position in 1844; acted as Head-of-State on a number of occasions
José María Castro Madriz	1846–1847	Provisional, popularly elected, became vice-president of State in 1847; acted as Head-of-State on a number of occasions

=== Vice-Presidents of State (1847–1848) ===
From 1847 to 1848 Costa Rica had a vice-president of State, who was popularly elected.

Name	Time in Office	Notes
José María Castro Madriz	1847	Acted as interim president
José María Alfaro Zamora	1847	Elected to a six-year term in 1847, resigned
Juan Rafael Mora Porras	1847–1848	Acted as president on a number of occasions; elected to fill term of predecessor, but resigned

=== Vice-Presidents of the Republic of Costa Rica (1848–1859) ===
From 1848 to 1849 the popularly elected Costa Rican Vice-president of the Republic presided over the Legislature.

Name	Time in Office	Notes
Manuel José Carazo Bonilla	1849	Elected to complete the 1849–1853 of his predecessor, but resigned; acted as president from March–April 1849
Juan Rafael Mora Porras	1849	Elected to complete Alfaro's mandate 1849–1853; was elected president in 1849
Francisco María Oreamuno Bonilla	1849–1856	Elected to complete Alfaro's mandate 1849, re-elected 1853, died in 1856; acted as president on a number of occasions
Vicente Aguilar Cubero	1856–1857	Elected to complete Oreamuno's mandate, resigned
Rafael García-Escalante Nava	1857–1859	Elected to complete Oreamuno's mandate, re-elected 1859, overthrown 1859; acted as president on a number of occasions

=== Designates to the Presidency 1859–1881 ===
In the Costa Rican constitutions of 1859, 1869 and 1871, the role of popularly elected vice-president was replaced by two designates to the presidency, elected annually by the Legislature.

Designates to the Presidency	Period of Mandate	Notes
1) Francisco Montealegre Fernández; 2) Vicente Aguilar Cubero	1860–1861	
1) Jesús Jiménez Zamora; 2) Juan Fernando Echeverría (resigned) and Juan González Reyes	1861–1862	
1) Julián Volio Llorente; 2) Manuel José Carazo Bonilla	1862–1863	
1) Agapito Jiménez Zamora; 2) Aniceto Esquivel Sáenz	1863–1864	
1) José María Castro Madriz; 2) Juan José Ulloa Solares	1864–1865; re-elected for the period 1865–1866	
1) Julián Volio Llorente; 2) Aniceto Esquivel Sáenz	1866–1867	
1) José María Montealegre Fernández; 2) Manuel Antonio Bonilla Nava	1867–1868	
1) Jesús Jiménez Zamora; 2) Francisco María Iglesias Llorente	Elected for the period 1868–1869; their mandate ended when the government was overthrown in 1868	
1) Eusebio Figueroa Oreamuno; 2) Agapito Jiménez Zamora	1869–1870; ended their mandate when the government was overthrown in April 1870	Eusebio Figueroa Oreamuno acted as interim president in April 1869
1) Rafael Barroeta Baca	Appointed Designate to the presidency by the de facto Government in 1870; performed the role until the constitutional government assumed power in 1872	Acted as president on a number of occasions
1) José Antonio Pinto Castro; 2) Rafael Barroeta Baca	1872–1873	José Antonio Pinto Castro acted as president from 1872 to 1873
1) Salvador González Ramírez; 2) Rafael Barroeta Baca	1873–1874	Salvador González Ramírez acted as president from November to December 1873 as did Rafael Barroeta Baca from 1873 to 1874
1) Rafael Barroeta Baca; 2) Vicente Herrera Zeledón	1874–1875	
1) Joaquín Lizano Gutiérrez; 2) Rafael Barroeta Baca	1875–1876	Joaquín Lizano Gutiérrez acted as interim president in 1875
1) Tomás Guardia Gutiérrez; 2) Vicente Herrera Zeledón (resigned) and Braulio Morales Cervantes	Elected for the period 1876–1877; ended their mandates when the government was overthrown in July 1876	
1) Tomás Guardia Gutiérrez; 2) Manuel Antonio Bonilla Nava	Appointed in 1876 by President Vicente Herrera Zeledón; ended their mandates in 1877	Tomás Guardia Gutiérrez acted as interim president in September 1877 and refused to recognise President Vicente Herrera Zeledón
1) Pedro Quirós Jiménez; 2) Rafael Barroeta Baca (died in 1880)	1877–1881	

=== Designates to the Presidency 1881–1882 ===
In 1881 President Tomás Guardia Gutiérrez replaced the system of two Designates to the presidency with one of seven Designates. This situation lasted until the constitutional government assumed power in 1882

Designates to the Presidency	Period of Mandate	Notes
1) Saturnino Lizano Gutiérrez (ended his mandate in July 1882 as he became President of the Republic); 2) Salvador Lara Zamora; 3) José María Castro Madriz; 4) Manuel Argüello Mora; 5) Pedro Quirós Jiménez; 6) Víctor Guardia Gutiérrez; 7) Próspero Fernández Oreamuno	Appointed by President Tomás Guardia Gutiérrez in 1881; ended their mandates when constitutional rule was restored in 1882	Saturnino Lizano Gutiérrez acted as interim president during June and July 1882, as did Salvador Lara Zamora from 1881 to 1882 and Próspero Fernández Oreamuno during July and August 1882. Saturnino Lizano Gutiérrez assumed the presidency on the death of President Tomás Guardia Gutiérrez in July 1882

=== Designates to the Presidency 1882–1948 ===
In 1882, with the restoration of the 1871 Constitution, Costa Rica returned to the system of Designates to the presidency, but with three designates, elected by the Legislature for same four-year period as the president of the Republic.

Designates to the Presidency	Period of Mandate	Notes
1) Luis Diego Sáenz Carazo (resigned in 1883) and Bernardo Soto Alfaro; 2) José María Castro Madriz (resigned in 1885) and Apolinar de Jesús Soto Quesada; 3) José María Oreamuno y Oreamuno	1882–1886	Bernardo Soto Alfaro assumed the presidency on the death of President Próspero Fernández Oreamuno in 1885
1) Apolinar de Jesús Soto Quesada; 2) Ascensión Esquivel Ibarra; 3) Carlos Durán Cartín	1886–1890	All three Designates acted as interim presidents
1) Pánfilo Valverde Carranza; 2) Carlos Durán Cartín; 3) Joaquín Lizano Gutiérrez	1890–1894	
1) José Rodríguez Zeledón; 2) Carlos Durán Cartín; 3) Ascensión Esquivel Ibarra	1894–1898	
1) Juan José Ulloa Giralt (resigned in 1898) and Demetrio Iglesias Llorente; 2) Juan Bautista Quirós Segura; 3) Ascensión Esquivel Ibarra (resigned in 1898), Demetrio Iglesias Llorente (Became First Designate in August 1898) and Federico Tinoco Iglesias;	1898–1902	Demetrio Iglesias Llorente acted as interim president on a number of occasions.
1) Rafael Yglesias Castro (resigned in July 1902) and Ricardo Jiménez Oreamuno; 2) Cleto González Víquez; 3) Juan Bautista Quirós Segura	1902–1906	
1) Carlos Durán Cartín; 2) Andrés Venegas García; 3) José Astúa Aguilar	1906–1910	
1) Manuel de Jesús Jiménez Oreamuno; 2) Alberto González Soto; 3) Ezequiel Gutiérrez Iglesias	1910–1914	
1) Alfredo González Flores; 2) Domingo González Pérez; 3) Francisco Aguilar Barquero	Elected for the period 1914–1918; ended their mandates when the government was overthrown in January 1917	Alfredo González Flores was appointed to the presidency for the period of this mandate
1) José Joaquín Tinoco Granados (resigned in 1919) and Juan Bautista Quirós Segura; 2) Rafael Cañas Mora; 3) Ezequiel Gutiérrez Iglesias	Elected for the period 1917–1923; ended their mandates with the end of constitutional rule in September 1919	Juan Bautista Quirós Segura acted as interim president and assumed the presidency, when President Federico Alberto Tinoco Granados resigned in August 1919
1) Andrés Venegas García; 2) Carlos María Jiménez Ortiz; 3) Carlos Brenes Ortiz	1919–1920	
1) Aquiles Acosta García; 2) Alfredo González Flores; 3) Arturo Volio Jiménez	1920–1924	
1) Carlos María Jiménez Ortiz; 2) Jorge Volio Jiménez; 3) Felipe José Alvarado Echandi	1924–1928	
1) Fabio Baudrit González; 2) Francisco Ross Ramírez; 3) Andrés Venegas García	1928–1932	
1) Ricardo Jiménez Oreamuno; 2) Julio Acosta García; 3) León Cortés Castro	1932–1936	Ricardo Jiménez Oreamuno was appointed president for the period 1932–1936
1) Carlos Pupo Pérez; 2) Jorge Hine Saborío; 3) Rafael Ángel Calderón Guardia	1936–1940	
1) Rafael Calderón Muñoz (died in 1943) and Teodoro Picado Michalski; 2) Jorge Hine Saborío; 3) Francisco Calderón Guardia	1940–1944	Rafael Calderón Muñoz, Jorge Hine Saborío and Francisco Calderón Guardia acted as interim presidents
1) Francisco Calderón Guardia; 2) René Picado Michalski; 3) Santos Leon Herrera	1944–1948	René Picado Michalski and Santos Leon Herrera acted as interim presidents.

=== Vice Presidents of Costa Rica (since 1949) ===
In accordance with the Costa Rican constitution of 7 November 1949 there are two vice presidents, popularly elected at the same time as the president.

Vice Presidents of Costa Rica	Period of Mandate	Notes
1) Alberto Oreamuno Flores; 2) Alfredo Volio Mata	Elected Vice-presidents of the Republic for the period 1949–1953	Both acted as interim presidents
1) Raúl Blanco Cervantes; 2) Fernando Esquivel Bonilla	Elected Vice-presidents of the Republic for the period 1953–1958	Both acted as interim presidents
1) Abelardo Bonilla Baldares; 2) José Joaquín Peralta Esquivel	Elected Vice-presidents of the Republic for the period 1958–1962	Abelardo Bonilla Baldares acted as interim president
1) Raúl Blanco Cervantes; 2) Carlos Sáenz Herrera	Elected Vice-presidents of the Republic for the period 1962–1966	Both acted as interim presidents
1) Jorge Vega Rodríguez; 2) Virgilio Calvo Sánchez	Elected Vice-presidents of the Republic for the period 1966–1970	Both acted as interim presidents
1) Manuel Aguilar Bonilla; 2) Jorge Rossi Chavarría	Elected Vice-presidents of the Republic for the period 1970–1974	Both acted as interim presidents
1) Carlos Manuel Castillo Morales; 2) Fernando Guzmán Mata	Elected Vice-presidents of the Republic for the period 1974–1978	Both acted as interim presidents
1) Rodrigo Altmann Ortiz; 2) José Miguel Alfaro Rodríguez	Elected Vice-presidents of the Republic for the period 1978–1982	Both acted as interim presidents
1) Alberto Fait Lizano (resigned); 2) Armando Aráuz Aguilar	Elected Vice-presidents of the Republic for the period 1982–1986	Both acted as interim presidents
1) Jorge Manuel Dengo Obregón; 2) Victoria Garrón Orozco de Doryan	Elected Vice-presidents of the Republic for the period 1986–1990	Both acted as interim presidents
1) Germán Serrano Pinto; 2) Arnoldo López Echandi	Elected Vice-presidents of the Republic for the period 1990–1994	Both acted as interim presidents
1) Rodrigo Oreamuno Blanco; 2) Rebeca Grynspan Mayufis	Elected Vice-presidents of the Republic for the period 1994–1998	Both acted as interim presidents
1) Astrid Fischel Volio; 2) Elizabeth Odio Benito	Elected Vice-presidents of the Republic for the period 1998–2002	Both acted as interim presidents
1) Lineth Saborío Chaverri; 2) Luis Fishman Zonzinski	Elected Vice-presidents of the Republic for the period 2002–2006	Lineth Saborío Chaverri acted as interim president. Luis Fishman Zonzinski never formally took office as the country's second vice president.
1) Laura Chinchilla Miranda (resigned 8 October 2008); 2) Kevin Casas Zamora (resigned 22 September 2007)	Elected Vice-presidents of the Republic for the period 2006–2010	Both have acted as interim presidents. As both resigned before completing their terms,^{Note 1} Legislative Assembly President Francisco Antonio Pacheco Fernández acted as interim president during temporary absences of then-President Óscar Arias.
1) Alfio Piva Mesén; 2) Luis Liberman Ginsburg	Elected Vice-presidents of the Republic for the period 2010–2014	Both have acted as interim presidents.
1) Helio Fallas Venegas; 2) Ana Helena Chacón Echeverría	Elected Vice-presidents of the Republic for the period 2014–2018	First members of Citizens' Action Party to be elected as the country's vice presidents.
1) Epsy Campbell Barr; 2) Marvin Rodríguez Cordero	Elected Vice-presidents of the Republic for the period 2018–2022	First woman of African descent elected as vice-president.
1) Stephan Brunner (resigned 31 July 2025); 2) Mary Munive	Elected Vice-presidents of the Republic for the period 2022–2026	
1) Francisco Gamboa; 2) Douglas Soto	Elected Vice-presidents of the Republic for the period 2026–2030	

== See also ==
- List of current vice presidents

== Notes ==
Note 1.Casas Zamora resigned following a political scandal, while Chinchilla resigned the next year in order to pursue presidency.
