= Ramón Castro y Ramírez =

Costa Rican judge and politician (1795–1867)

11th President of the Supreme Court
- In office 8 June 1843 – November 1844
- Preceded by: Manuel Mora Fernández
- Succeeded by: Luz Blanco y Zamora

Magistrate of the Supreme Court of Justice
- In office 14 May 1847 – 8 May 1850
- In office 8 June 1843 – November 1844
- In office 29 April 1835 – 12 March 1839

Personal details
- Born: José Ramón Castro y Ramírez; 8 December 1795 San José, Captaincy General of Guatemala, Spanish Empire
- Died: 27 May 1867 (aged 71) San José, Costa Rica
- Spouse: María Lorenza Madriz Cervantes (m. 1818; died 1870)
- Children: José María Castro Madriz
- Relatives: Antonio Pinto Soares (brother-in-law); Juan de los Santos Madriz y Cervantes (brother-in-law)

José Ramón Castro y Ramírez (8 December 1795 – 27 May 1867) was a Costa Rican judge, landowner and politician who served as the 11th President of the Supreme Court of Justice from 1843 to 1844. He was a magistrate of the country's highest court during three separate periods between 1835 and 1850 and also served several terms in the Senate. He was the father of President José María Castro Madriz.

== Biography ==
José Ramón Castro y Ramírez was born in San José on 8 December 1795, the son of Francisco Castro y Alvarado and María de la Trinidad Ramírez y Ulloa. His sister, María del Rosario Castro, was married to Antonio Pinto Soares, who briefly served as acting Head of State of Costa Rica in 1842.

On 1 April 1818, he married Lorenza Madriz y Cervantes. The couple had one son, José María Castro Madriz, who later became the first President of Costa Rica.

Castro was involved in both public service and agricultural activities throughout his life. He served as port captain of Puntarenas and was appointed a magistrate of the Superior Court of Justice, serving from 1835 to 1839. On 8 June 1843, the Constituent Assembly appointed him president of the Judicial Chamber, then the country's highest judicial body. He held the position until 1844, presiding over a court composed of magistrates Juan Rafael Ramos, Juan González y Reyes, and Ramón Gómez, with Santos Velázquez y Tinoco serving as prosecutor.

In addition to his judicial career, Castro was active in national politics. He served as a senator from 1845 to 1847, returned to the judiciary as a magistrate from 1847 to 1850, was elected alternate senator in 1863, and again served as senator from 1864 until his death.

Although he held several public offices, agriculture remained his principal occupation. During the last fifteen years of his life, he resided primarily on his coffee plantation near San José. He was also known as a benefactor of the town of Escazú.

Castro died in San José on 27 May 1867.
