= Jorge Hine Saborío =

Costa Rican businessman and politician (1878–1962)

Second Designate to the Presidency
- In office 8 May 1936 – 8 May 1944
- President: León Cortés Castro; Rafael Ángel Calderón Guardia
- Preceded by: Julio Acosta García
- Succeeded by: René Picado Michalski

Personal details
- Born: Jorge Hine Saborío; 6 October 1878 San Ramón, Costa Rica
- Died: 16 May 1962 (aged 83) San José, Costa Rica
- Party: PRN

Jorge Hine Saborío (6 October 1878 – 16 May 1962) was a Costa Rican businessman and politician who served as Second Designate to the Presidency from 1936 to 1944.

He was born in San Ramón, Costa Rica, to Luis Hine Ramírez and Enriqueta Saborío Iglesias. He married Ana María García Bottino, the daughter of Vespancio García Cuervo and Colomba Bottino Capiro, on June 17, 1904, in San José.

He was a businessman of substantial means, and he was the Bank Manager of Costa Rica. He was Vice President of the Republic from May 8, 1936 to May 8, 1944. From March 4 to March 16, 1943, he acted temporarily as president while President Rafael Ángel Calderón Guardia was absent, traveling to Panama.
