= Francisco Calderón Guardia =

Costa Rican businessman and politician (1906–1977)

First Designate to the Presidency
- In office 8 May 1944 – 8 May 1948
- President: Teodoro Picado Michalski; Santos León Herrera (acting)
- Preceded by: Teodoro Picado Michalski
- Succeeded by: Office abolished

Third Designate to the Presidency
- In office 8 May 1940 – 8 May 1944
- President: Rafael Ángel Calderón Guardia
- Preceded by: Rafael Ángel Calderón Guardia
- Succeeded by: Santos León Herrera

Personal details
- Born: Francisco Calderón Guardia; 23 June 1906 San José, Costa Rica
- Died: 16 July 1977 (aged 71) San José, Costa Rica
- Party: PRN
- Relatives: Rafael Ángel Calderón Guardia (brother)

Francisco Calderón Guardia (13 June 1906 – 17 July 1977) was a Costa Rican businessman and politician who served as First Designate to the Presidency from 1944 to 1948.

Guardia was a member of the influential Calderón-Guardia family, born in San José, the son of Rafael Ángel Calderón Muñoz and Ana Maria Guardia Mora. He was married three times, first in 1937 with Leticia G.H.G. Bernini, second with Josefina Gonzalez and third in 1965 with Maria Luisa Lopez Mejia.

During the presidential administration of his brother Rafael Ángel Calderón Guardia, Francisco Calderón Guardia was Secretary of the Interior (1940-1942) and Minister of Public Security (1942-1944). From 1940 until 1944, Guardia was third Vice President of Costa Rica. During which time he served for five days (1 to 5 December 1941) as the interim President, while his brother was on a trip to Nicaragua. He was first Vice President of Costa Rica in the following administration of Teodoro Picado Michalski, 1944-1948.

After the civil war of 1948, Guardia and his brothers fled to Nicaragua. Later he moved to Mexico, from whence he returned to Costa Rica in 1958. He was again a member of the Costa Rican government as a deputy from 1958 to 1962 in the administration of Mario Echandi Jiménez. In 1966, he joined with his brother, Rafael Ángel, in forming the National Unification Party, and after his brother's death in 1970, Guardia became the most prominent figure in the party.

Francisco Calderón Guardia died in San Jose, Costa Rica, on 17 July 1977.
