= Nazario Toledo =

Costa Rican politician

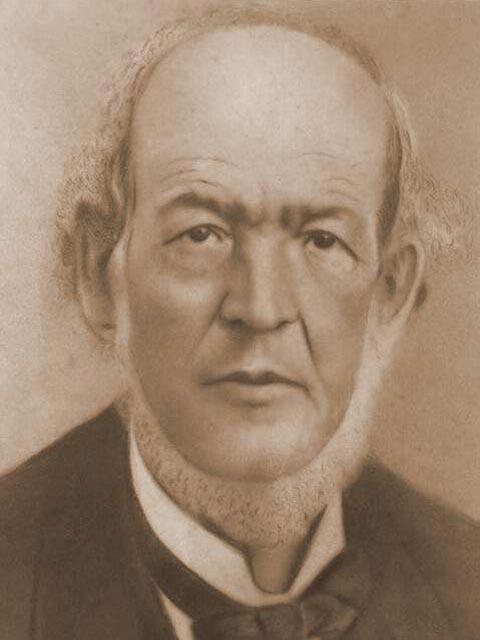

Personal details
- Born: 20 July 1807; Guatemala City, Guatemala

Nazario Toledo (July 20, 1807 – December 17, 1887) was a Costa Rican politician.

Nazario was born in Guatemala City on 20 July 1807.

Toledo is believed to have come to Costa Rica from Guatemala in 1835. Toledo was the president of the 1846 Constituent Assembly of Costa Rica, Plenipotentiary Minister of Costa Rica in Guatemala in 1849, an instructor at the Casa de Enseñanza de Santo Tomás and the University of Santo Tomás in 1858, and the Minister of Public Instruction in 1858.

He returned to Guatemala indefinitely in 1859.
