= Vicente Herrera Zeledón =

President of Costa Rica from 1876 to 1877

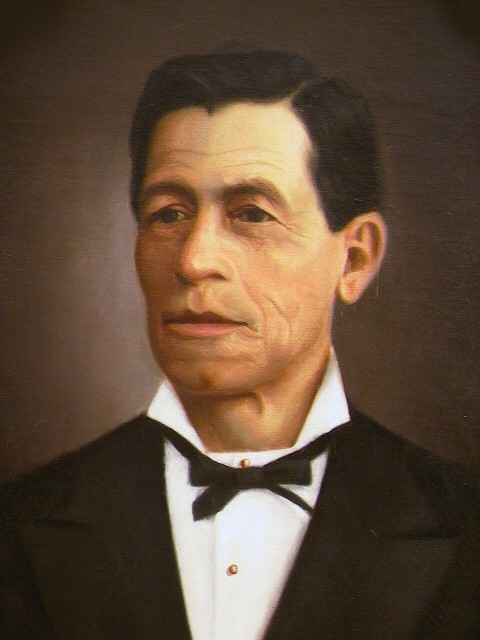

10th President of Costa Rica
- Provisional
- In office 30 July 1876 – 23 September 1877
- Preceded by: Aniceto Esquivel Sáenz
- Succeeded by: Tomás Guardia Gutiérrez

Second Designate to the Presidency
- In office 22 May 1874 – 5 May 1875
- President: Tomás Guardia Gutiérrez
- Preceded by: Rafael Barroeta Baca
- Succeeded by: Rafael Barroeta Baca
Other positions
Secretary of Foreign Affairs (Note: Simultaneously in charge of the portfolios of Public Instruction and Charity.)
Acting
In office 20 May 1875 – 8 May 1876
President	Tomás Guardia Gutiérrez
Preceded by	Salvador Jiménez Blanco
Succeeded by	Juan Rafael Mata Lafuente
In office 3 March 1874 – 14 December 1874
President	Tomás Guardia Gutiérrez
Preceded by	Luis Diego Sáenz Carazo
Succeeded by	Salvador Jiménez Blanco
In office 6 September 1873 – 21 November 1873
President	Tomás Guardia Gutiérrez
Preceded by	Lorenzo Montúfar y Rivera
Succeeded by	José María Castro Madriz
Secretary of Interior and Police
In office 1 December 1873 – 8 May 1876
President	Tomás Guardia Gutiérrez
Succeeded by	Saturnino Lizano Gutiérrez
In office 15 February 1873 – 21 November 1873
President	Tomás Guardia Gutiérrez
Member of the Chamber of Senators
In office 1 May 1862 – 30 April 1866
Constituency	San José
17th President of the Supreme Court
In office 17 October 1856 – 29 April 1860
Preceded by	Rafael Ramírez Hidalgo
Succeeded by	José María Castro Madriz
Prosecutor of the Supreme Court of Justice
In office 19 April 1852 – 17 October 1856
Preceded by	Ramón Quirós y Pacheco
Succeeded by	Juan José Ulloa Solares

Personal details
- Born: Vicente de las Mercedes Herrera Zeledón; 20 January 1821 San José, Captaincy General of Guatemala, Spanish Empire
- Died: 10 November 1888 (aged 67) San José, Costa Rica
- Party: Independent
- Spouse: Guadalupe Gutiérrez García (m. 1853)
- Children: 3
- Education: Universidad de San Carlos de Guatemala (LL.D.)
- Occupation: Lawyer; politician; judge; professor

Vicente de las Mercedes Herrera Zeledón (20 January 1821 – 10 November 1888) was a Costa Rican jurist, academic and politician who served as the 10th President of Costa Rica from 1876 to 1877. He assumed the presidency following the overthrow of Aniceto Esquivel Sáenz and resigned the following year, after which Tomás Guardia Gutiérrez returned to office.

== Early life and education ==
Herrera was born in San José on 20 January 1821, the son of José Cleto Herrera Salazar and Antonia Zeledón Masís. He completed his studies in philosophy at the Casa de Enseñanza de Santo Tomás in 1839 before moving to Guatemala in 1846. In 1849, he earned a doctorate in law from the University of San Carlos of Guatemala and was admitted to the Costa Rican bar on 20 May 1850.

On 18 December 1853, he married Guadalupe Gutiérrez García, daughter of Atanasio Gutiérrez y Lizaurzábal, who had served as President of the Supreme Court from 1832 to 1833, and María del Pilar García Ramírez. The couple had three children: Angélica, Vicente, and Mercedes Herrera Gutiérrez.

== Academic and legal career ==
Herrera taught Castilian and Latin grammar at the Casa de Enseñanza de Santo Tomás until 1845. After the institution became the University of Santo Tomás, he served as professor of canon law and public law, university secretary, and member of its Academic Board. In 1870, he briefly served as rector of the university.

He also held several positions within the Catholic Church's administration, including President of the Board of Charity of San José, Notary Major of the Ecclesiastical Curia, and Secretary of the Cathedral Chapter of the Diocese of Costa Rica. His political views were generally associated with the conservative current of Costa Rican politics and reflected the influence of Catholic social and educational thought.

== Public career ==
Herrera served as secretary to President Juan Rafael Mora Porras during the Filibuster War of 1856. He also held office as a deputy in Congress, Governor of San José Province, and Minister Plenipotentiary to Guatemala and Nicaragua.

In 1851, Congress elected him as a magistrate of the Supreme Court of Justice. He became Prosecutor of the Supreme Court in 1852 and was re-elected in 1855. On 17 October 1856, he was elected President (Regent) of the Supreme Court, serving until 29 April 1860 after being re-elected in 1858. He was elected to the Chamber of Senators at a later point, and was serving as its secretary between 1864 and 1865.

During the administration of Tomás Guardia Gutiérrez, Herrera occupied several senior government positions. He was a member of the Council of State (1870–1872), Secretary of the Interior (1873–1876), Acting Secretary of Foreign Affairs on several occasions between 1873 and 1876, and Second Designate to the Presidency from 1874 to 1875.

Following the inauguration of President Aniceto Esquivel Sáenz in May 1876, Herrera was elected Second Designate to the Presidency by the Constitutional Congress. Two days later, however, he resigned from the office, stating that he expected to be absent from the country for an extended period and that it would therefore be preferable for Congress to appoint another officeholder in his place.

== Presidency (1876–1877) ==
Following the military coup of 30 July 1876, Herrera was proclaimed Provisional President of the Republic. The coup suspended the Constitution of 1871 and vested the provisional government with extraordinary powers. Although Herrera served as head of state, political and military authority remained concentrated in the hands of General Tomás Guardia Gutiérrez, Commander-in-Chief of the Army and First Designate to the Presidency.

Herrera appointed Guardia, Manuel Antonio Bonilla Nava, and Saturnino Lizano Gutiérrez as First, Second, and Third Designates to the Presidency, respectively. His cabinet included Rafael Machado y Jáuregui as Secretary of Foreign Affairs, Lizano as Secretary of the Interior and Police, Joaquín Lizano Gutiérrez and later Tomás Guardia Gutiérrez as Secretary of Finance and Commerce, and Rafael Barroeta Baca as Secretary of Public Works. Responsibility for the Ministry of War and Navy was initially assigned to the Secretary of the Interior and later transferred to the Secretary of Finance. A five-member Council of State, chaired by Manuel Antonio Bonilla Nava, was also established to advise the executive.

During Herrera's administration, the government granted financial support to the San Luis Gonzaga School in Cartago, adopted measures to strengthen public education, introduced reforms aimed at reducing smuggling, restored municipal governments in the cantonal capitals after their abolition in 1859, and implemented measures to reduce public expenditure. During an official visit to Guanacaste in May 1877, the town of Guardia was founded and the canton of Carrillo was created. The administration also imposed restrictions on the press and adopted other security measures, particularly following an attempted uprising in 1877.

On 11 September 1877, Herrera temporarily transferred executive authority to Tomás Guardia, citing health reasons. Twelve days later, on 23 September, a meeting of prominent political and military figures convened by Guardia proclaimed him President of the Republic, effectively ending Herrera's administration.

== Later life ==
Following his removal from office, Herrera went into exile in El Salvador. In 1879, he joined a group of Costa Rican political exiles opposed to the Guardia government. After returning to Costa Rica, he withdrew from public life and took no further part in politics.

Herrera died on 10 November 1888 at the age of 67. His funeral was conducted with military honors by order of the government of President Bernardo Soto Alfaro.

== Notes ==
Political offices
Preceded by Aniceto Esquivel Sáenz	President of Costa Rica; 1876–1877	Succeeded by Tomás Guardia Gutiérrez
