= Rodrigo Altmann Ortiz =

Costa Rican politician

Rodrigo Altmann Ortiz was a politician from Social Christian Unity Party of Costa Rica who served as First Vice President of Costa Rica.

== Personal life ==
He was born in San José, Costa Rica on February 20, 1930 in the family of José Altmann and Lia Ortiz Roger. He was specialist in surgery.
