= Manuel Antonio Bonilla Nava =

Costa Rican politician (1806–1880

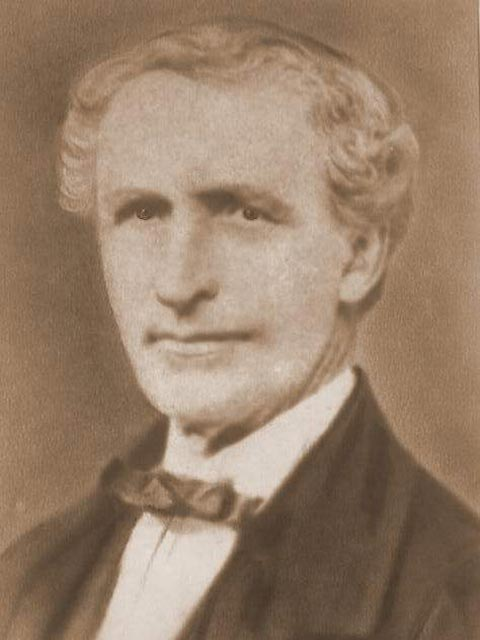
- Bonilla in 1836

Second Designate to the Presidency
- In office 30 July 1876 – 23 September 1877
- President: Vicente Herrera Zeledón
- Preceded by: Braulio Morales Cervantes
- Succeeded by: Rafael Barroeta Baca

President of the Constitutional Congress
- In office 1 May 1872 – 30 July 1876
- Preceded by: Position established
- Succeeded by: Víctor Guardia Gutiérrez (1882)

Deputy of the Constitutional Congress
- In office 1 May 1872 – 30 July 1876
- Constituency: San José Province

Member of the House of Representatives
- In office 1 May 1866 – 1 November 1868
- Constituency: San José Province

Vice Head of State of Costa Rica
- In office May 1841 – 11 April 1842
- President: Braulio Carrillo Colina
- Preceded by: Miguel Carranza Fernández
- Succeeded by: Juan Mora Fernández

Personal details
- Born: Manuel Antonio José Ramón Bonilla Nava; 15 October 1806 Cartago, Province of Costa Rica, Captaincy General of Guatemala, Spanish Empire
- Died: 23 December 1880 (aged 74) San José, Costa Rica
- Party: Independent
- Relations: Braulio Carrillo Colina (uncle-in-law)

Manuel Antonio José Ramón Bonilla Nava (15 October 1806 – 23 December 1880) was a Costa Rican politician.

He was born in Cartago. His parents were Félix de Bonilla y Pacheco and Catalina de Nava López del Corral, the daughter of the Spanish Governor José Joaquín de Nava y Cabezudo. In San José, Costa Rica, May 16, 1830 he married Jesús Carrillo y Morales, the daughter of Basilio Carrillo Colina and Jacinta Morales y Saravia, the niece of Braulio Carrillo Colina, head of state from 1835 to 1837 and from 1838 to 1842.

In 1841 he was elected as Deputy Chief of State and Minister General, positions he held until the fall of the government of Braulio Carrillo Colina on April 12, 1842. He was temporarily in charge of the head of the State from April 8 to 12, 1842.
