= Costa Rican Constitution of 1871 =

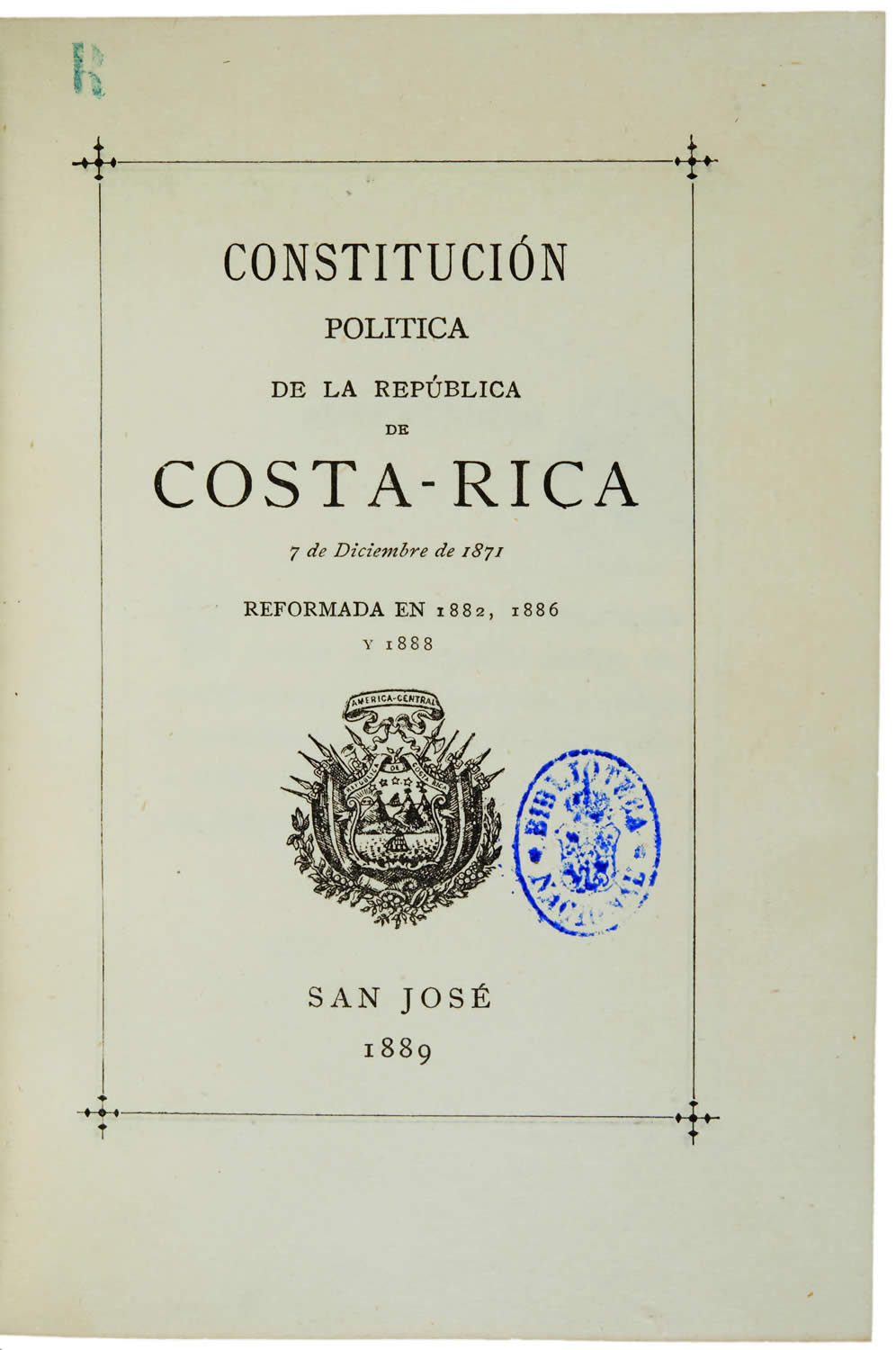
Book at National Library of Costa Rica.

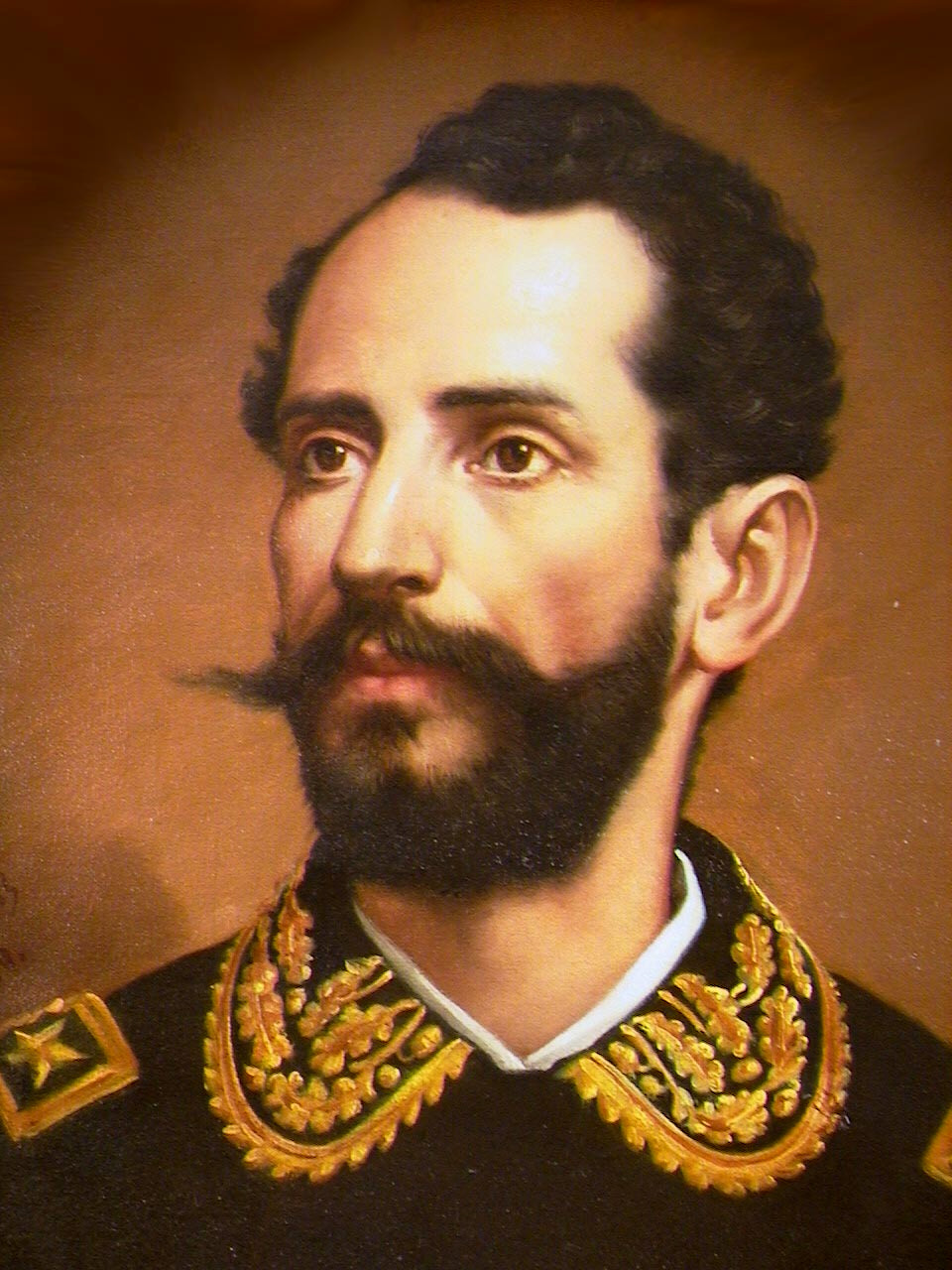
Tomás Guardia.

The Political Constitution of Costa Rica of 1871 has been the longest duration Constitution in the history of the country, as except for brief periods, it was in force between 1871 and 1949. Influenced by the Liberals, the Constitution of 1871 was quite pioneering for the time and, among other things, abolished the death penalty, decreed the freedom of religion, strengthened education and separated the three branches of the Republic.

== History ==
In 1870 the provisional Costa Rican president Bruno Carranza Ramírez called a Constituent Assembly shortly before resigning his post, which was assumed by General Tomás Guardia. This Assembly temporarily maintained the 1859 Constitution, however, Guardia dissolved that Assembly on 10 October 1870. On 12 August 1871, elections were held to elect deputies to the new Constituent Assembly, which was established on 5 March 1870. October of that year and until 7 December 1871, in which the new Constitution emanated.

The elections for constituent deputies of convened by President Guardia were held in August 1871, shortly after Guardia dissolved the previous Constitutional Conventionjust when Carranza presented his resignation under pressure from Guardia, who was commander of the Army. Soon the tensions between Guardia and the Carrancistas became obvious, so Guardia annulled the Assembly and called new elections using a different Electoral Law. While for the elections of 1870 Carranza used a law of its creation issued on 20 June 1871, that established as requirements to be able to vote be over 25 years, own a property valued at at least one thousand pesos or an annual income of five hundred and priests, soldiers and judicial officials were banned from voting.

Guardia modified the law to call these elections establishing, among other things, the elimination of economic requirements and allowed members of the clergy, the judiciary and the military to vote and be elected deputies, likewise the requirements they were older than 25 years old, able to read and write and be a resident of the province where they voted. This National Constituent Convention successfully drafted the Constitution of 1871 that has been the longest lasting in the country. Except for a very short time Guardia would remain in power as a dictator until his death in 1882, during which time only calls for municipal elections, and two unsuccessful attempts to convene new constituents in 1876 and 1880 would be canceled. before being finalized by Guardia mainly for fear that they would be used by the opposition.
