= Aniceto Esquivel Sáenz =

President of Costa Rica in 1876

Aniceto Esquivel
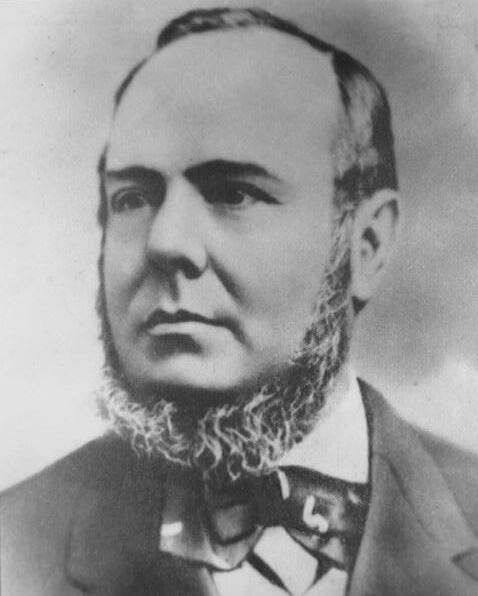
- Esquivel c. 1876

9th President of Costa Rica
- In office 8 May 1876 – 30 July 1876
- Preceded by: Tomás Guardia Gutiérrez
- Succeeded by: Vicente Herrera Zeledón

President of the Constitutional Congress
- In office 1 May 1886 – 30 April 1889
- Preceded by: Juan Manuel Carazo Peralta
- Succeeded by: Manuel Aragón Quesada

Deputy of the Constitutional Congress
- In office 1 May 1884 – 30 April 1892
- Constituency: San José Province
- In office 1 May 1872 – 30 April 1876
- Constituency: San José Province

Secretary of Foreign Affairs
- In office 1 November 1868 – 5 January 1869
- President: Jesús Jiménez Zamora
- Preceded by: Julián Volio Llorente
- Succeeded by: Juan Rafael Mata Lafuente

Personal details
- Born: Aniceto del Carmen Esquivel Sáenz; 18 April 1824 Cartago, Costa Rica, Federal Republic of Central America
- Died: 22 October 1898 (aged 74) San José, Costa Rica
- Education: Universidad de San Carlos de Guatemala (BA)

Aniceto del Carmen Esquivel Sáenz (18 April 1824 – 22 October 1898) was a Costa Rican politician who served as the 9th President of Costa Rica from May to July 1876, before being deposed in a coup d'état by Tomás Guardia Gutiérrez.

== Early life ==
Aniceto del Carmen Esquivel Sáenz was born in Cartago, Costa Rica on 18 April 1824, to Narciso Esquivel Salazar and Ursula Sáenz Ulloa. His father was a wealthy coffee grower and one of the signatories of the Act of Independence of the Republic of Costa Rica. He graduated with a law degree from the Universidad de San Carlos Borromeo.

== Career ==
Esquivel was a professor at the University of Santo Tomas. He was a member of the constituent assemblies of 1859 and 1869. He served as president of the Constitutional Congress of Costa Rica.

General Lorenzo Salazar Alvarado supported Esquivel and Esquivel was considered as a candidate in the 1863 and 1866 elections, but he did not run. Esquivel won the 1876 presidential election, which 0.2% of the population voted in. His government allocated 20,000 pesos to exhume and transfer the remains of Braulio Carrillo Colina, the former head of state, from El Salvador to Costa Rica. A funeral for Juan Rafael Mora Porras was also organised by his government.

Nicaragua attempted to nullify the Cañas–Jerez Treaty during Esquivel's presidency and threatened war between the two countries. Tomás Guardia Gutiérrez wanted to launch a war against Nicaragua, but Esquivel refused to do so. Guardia and military officers loyal to him overthrew Esquivel on 30 July 1876. Vicente Herrera Zeledón replaced him as president.

== Personal life ==
Esquivel married Ana Isaura Carazo y Peralta, the daughter of Manuel José Carazo Bonilla, on 29 February 1856, and fathered thirteen children with her. He died in San José, Costa Rica on 22 October 1898.

== Works cited ==
=== Books ===
- Carbonell, Jorge (2002). Los meses de don Aniceto: ascenso y caída de don Aniceto Esquivel Sáenz. Editorial Tecnológica de Costa Rica. ISBN 9789968311823.
- Quirós, Luko (2018). Turrialba en la mirada de los viajeros. Editorial Tecnológica de Costa Rica. ISBN 9789977664439.
- Yashar, Deborah (1997). Demanding Democracy: Reform and Reaction in Costa Rica and Guatemala, 1870s-1950s. Stanford University Press. ISBN 9789977664439.

=== Web ===
- "Aniceto Esquivel Sáenz". Legislative Assembly of Costa Rica. Archived from the original on 3 February 2026.

Political offices
Preceded by Tomás Guardia Gutiérrez	President of Costa Rica; 1876	Succeeded by Vicente Herrera Zeledón
