= Tomás Guardia Gutiérrez =

President of Costa Rica (1870–1876, 1877–1882)

General Tomás Guardia Gutiérrez
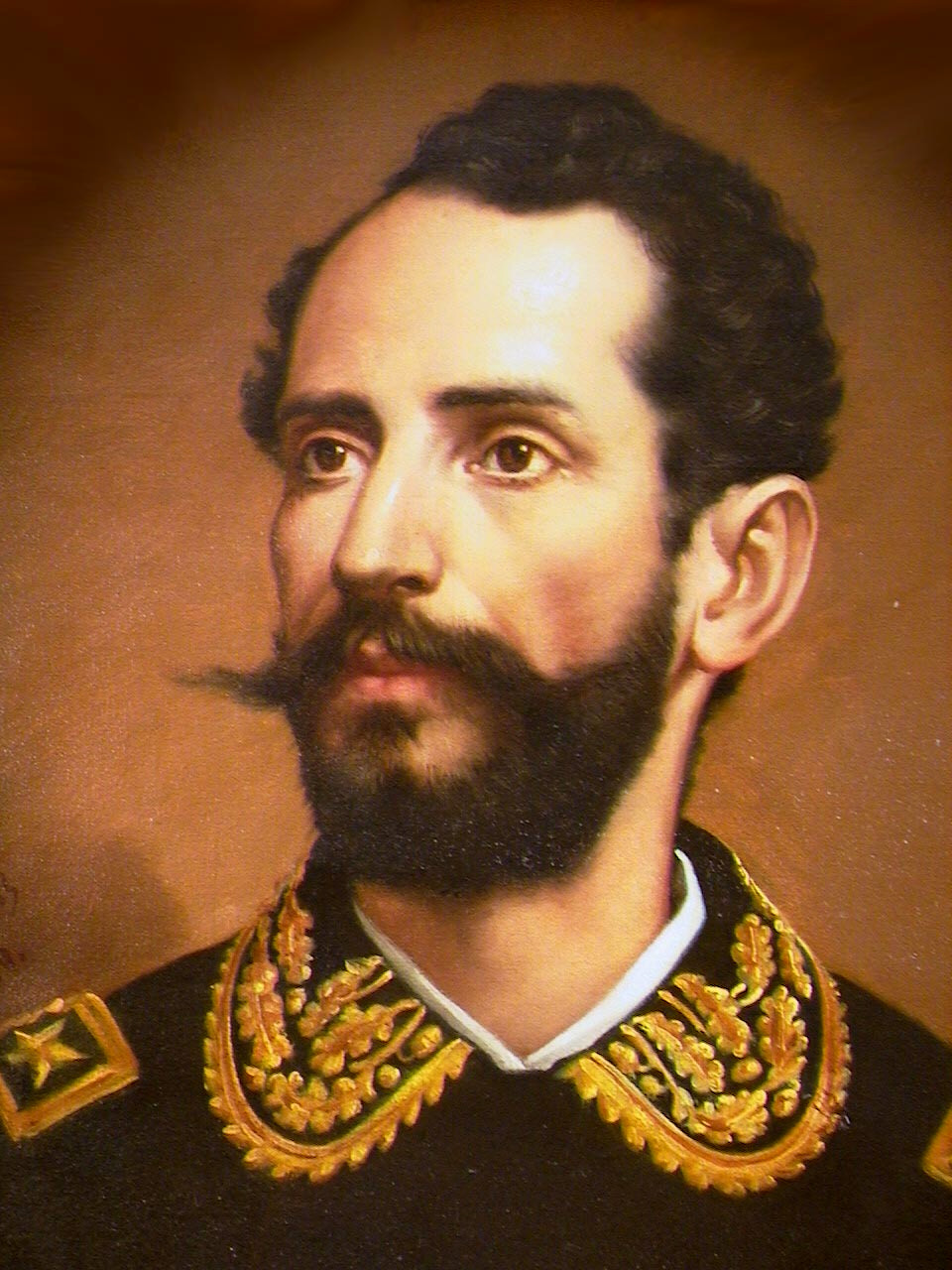
- Portrait by Aquiles Bigot

8th & 11th President of Costa Rica
- In office 23 September 1877 – 6 July 1882
- Preceded by: Vicente Herrera Zeledón
- Succeeded by: Saturnino Lizano Gutiérrez
- In office 8 August 1870 – 8 May 1876
- Preceded by: Bruno Carranza Ramírez
- Succeeded by: Aniceto Esquivel Sáenz

First Designate to the Presidency
- In office 30 July 1876 – 23 September 1877
- President: Vicente Herrera Zeledón
- Preceded by: Joaquín Lizano Gutiérrez
- Succeeded by: Pedro Quirós Jiménez

Personal details
- Born: Tomás Miguel Guardia Gutiérrez; 16 December 1831 Bagaces, Costa Rica, Federal Republic of Central America
- Died: 6 July 1882 (aged 50) Alajuela, Costa Rica
- Party: Independent
- Spouse: Emilia Solórzano Alfaro (m. 1857)
- Occupation: Military officer; politician

Tomás Miguel Guardia Gutiérrez (16 December 1831 – 6 July 1882) was a Costa Rican military officer and politician who was the 8th and 11th President of Costa Rica, serving from 1870 to 1876 and again from 1877 until his death in 1882. He remains one of the most influential figures in 19th-century Costa Rican politics. He headed a military dictatorship.

Guardia rose to prominence as a leading figure in the military coup of 27 April 1870, when a group of army officers overthrew President Jesús Jiménez Zamora. Initially, he wielded power behind the scenes during the brief administration of his fellow conspirator, Bruno Carranza Ramírez, but after only three months, Guardia assumed the presidency himself in an acting capacity. He was elected in 1872 for a three-year term.

On 8 May 1876, Guardia formally relinquished the presidency to Aniceto Esquivel Sáenz, who had been elected earlier that year. However, he continued to exert significant political influence, effectively controlling both Esquivel's administration and that of his successor, Vicente Herrera Zeledón. On 11 September 1877, Guardia returned to the presidency. Shortly thereafter, he abolished the death penalty, making Costa Rica one of the first Latin American nations to do so.

Guardia remained in power until his death in 1882, marking the end of an era defined by his strong leadership, constitutional reform, and increasing state consolidation. Despite criticisms of his authoritarian tendencies, his influence on Costa Rica's political development was profound and long-lasting.

A key legacy of his first administration was the promulgation of the 1871 Constitution, a liberal and durable legal framework that guided Costa Rican governance for nearly eight decades, until the 1948 Civil War. His government emphasized centralization and national modernization, including improvements to infrastructure and the military.

Political offices
Preceded by Bruno Carranza Ramírez	President of Costa Rica; 1870–1876	Succeeded by Aniceto Esquivel Sáenz
Preceded by Vicente Herrera Zeledón	President of Costa Rica; 1877–1882	Succeeded by Saturnino Lizano Gutiérrez
