= First Costa Rican Republic =

1848–1948 state in Central America

Republic of Costa Rica República de Costa Rica
- 1848–1948
- Flag (1848–1906) Coat of arms

- Capital: San José
- Official languages: Spanish
- Government: Presidential republic: under a military dictatorship (1917–1919)
- President
  - 1848–1948: List
- Legislature: Constitutional Congress
- Historical era: Liberal State
  - 1848 Constitution: 31 August 1848
  - Costa Rican Civil War: 12 March – 24 April 1948
- Currency: Real (until 1850); Peso (1850–1896); Colón (since 1896)
Preceded by	Succeeded by
Free State of Costa Rica	Second Costa Rican Republic

The First Costa Rican Republic is the name given to the historical period between the proclamation of the Republic of Costa Rica in the 1848 reformed Constitution and the official decree by then President José María Castro Madriz on 31 August 1848 and the Costa Rican Civil War of 1948 which ended with the enactment of the current 1949 Constitution on 7 November 1949 starting the Second Costa Rican Republic.

The First Costa Rican Republic marked the dominion of the liberal ideology and the hegemony of a very powerful liberal oligarchy that ruled the country for most of its history. The liberal hegemony was so prevalent that the period between 1870 and 1940 is known as the Liberal State. However, the exhaustion of the model and discontent from the working classes would result in a series of left-leaning social-reformist governments in the 1930s and 1940s and the consequent civil war.

== History ==
The First Republic was founded by the last President of the Free State of Costa Rica and first President of the Republic of Costa Rica José María Castro Madriz earning the official title of “Father of the Republic” in Costa Rica's law. Liberal and freemason, Madriz was a brilliant intellectual trying to promote a very enlighten society. Madriz would be president in two non-consecutive terms, both of them deposed by the military. During this period the long authoritarian government of General Tomás Guardia happened. However, Guardia was also a liberal and promoted some progressive reforms including the abolition of the death penalty and the use of torture since 1871. Guardia's Constitution of 1871 is the longer lasting Constitution of Costa Rica to this date. Another important presidency was that of Juan Rafael Mora Porras, caudillo during the Filibuster War which is by many historians considered Costa Rica's true “war of independence”.

Despite its achievements in many areas including economy, secularization, freedoms and civil rights, the liberal hegemony gave little space for dissent. Both the conservatives and the more left-leaning groups were excluded from power by the use of questionable methods, and authoritarian governments and factional fighting among the liberals were common. For example, the 1889 Costa Rican general election saw the fights between the Catholic Church supporting candidate José Joaquín Rodríguez Zeledón against liberal Ascensión Esquivel Ibarra with the government of then president Bernardo Soto Alfaro openly supporting Esquivel and almost rejecting Zeledón's victory until popular unrest changed his mind and caused his resignation. Similarly president Alfredo González Flores attempt to tax the Grand Capital caused the 1917 Costa Rican coup d'état by Federico Tinoco and his short-lived two years dictatorship.

But the real challenge to the Liberal model would come from the left-wing groups that started to flourish in the early 20th century, including groups of Christian socialists, social-democrats, anarchists, socialists and communists. This helped in the victory of Christian socialist candidate Rafael Angel Calderón Guardia in the 1940 Costa Rican general election. Calderón's alliance with the Communist Party of Costa Rica led by Manuel Mora and the Catholic Church led by archbishop Víctor Manuel Sanabria Martínez allowed the Social Reform, which at the same time would cause the outbreak of the Civil War.

== Government ==
The Constitution of 1847 creates for the first time the office of President of the Republic (formerly President of the State) and a Vice President is created to replace him in his temporary or permanent absences, however the position of vice president would be abolished in 1859 and not it would be restored until the creation of the two vice-presidencies in 1949. In their place there were "appointed to the presidency" elected among the legislators. The Constitution of 1847 established a unicameral system with a single parliament called Constitutional Congress, however the constitutions of 1844, 1859, 1869 and 1917 all stipulated bicameral systems with a Senate and a House of Representatives or Deputies. It also established an Independent judiciary.

== Religion ==
The 1847 Constitution established the official status of the Catholic Church as the state religion and the prohibition of any other public worship. However, the 1848 Constitutional reform despite keeping the official status and the exclusive right to receive public funding, also allowed freedom of religion. All other Constitutions kept the state religion status of Catholicism and the duty of the State to funding it, but explicitly established the religious tolerance of the other faiths which was a difference from most of the Constitutions of the previous State of Costa Rica that made Catholicism mandatory.

The Costa Rican population at the time was very homogenous religiously and almost all of the population was Catholic. Freemasonry was introduced in 1865 and soon became popular among the liberal elites, alongside the influential Theosophical Society. A series of anti-clerical measures after the consolidation of the Liberal State after 1870 which included the expulsion of the Jesuits and prohibition of all monastic orders, expulsion of Bishop Bernard Thiel, secularization of education and cemeteries, closure of the Santo Tomás University and legalization of divorce and civil marriage caused tensions with the Catholic Church that almost causes a civil uprising during the 1889 Costa Rican general election. However, after a while both the Church and the liberal elite found themselves enjoying a certain stability with their respective camps of action thoroughly delimited.

On June 1, 1902 the first official lodge of the Theosophical Society is founded in the country. Further migratory waves of new ethnic groups attracted for economic opportunities or escaping poverty or persecution in their countries made even more diverse the religious landscape including the immigration of Polish Jews, Maronite Lebanese, Mahayana Buddhist Chinese and Protestant Jamaicans during late 19th and early 20th century.
