= Emilia Navas Aparicio =

Costa Rican prosecutor (born 1964)

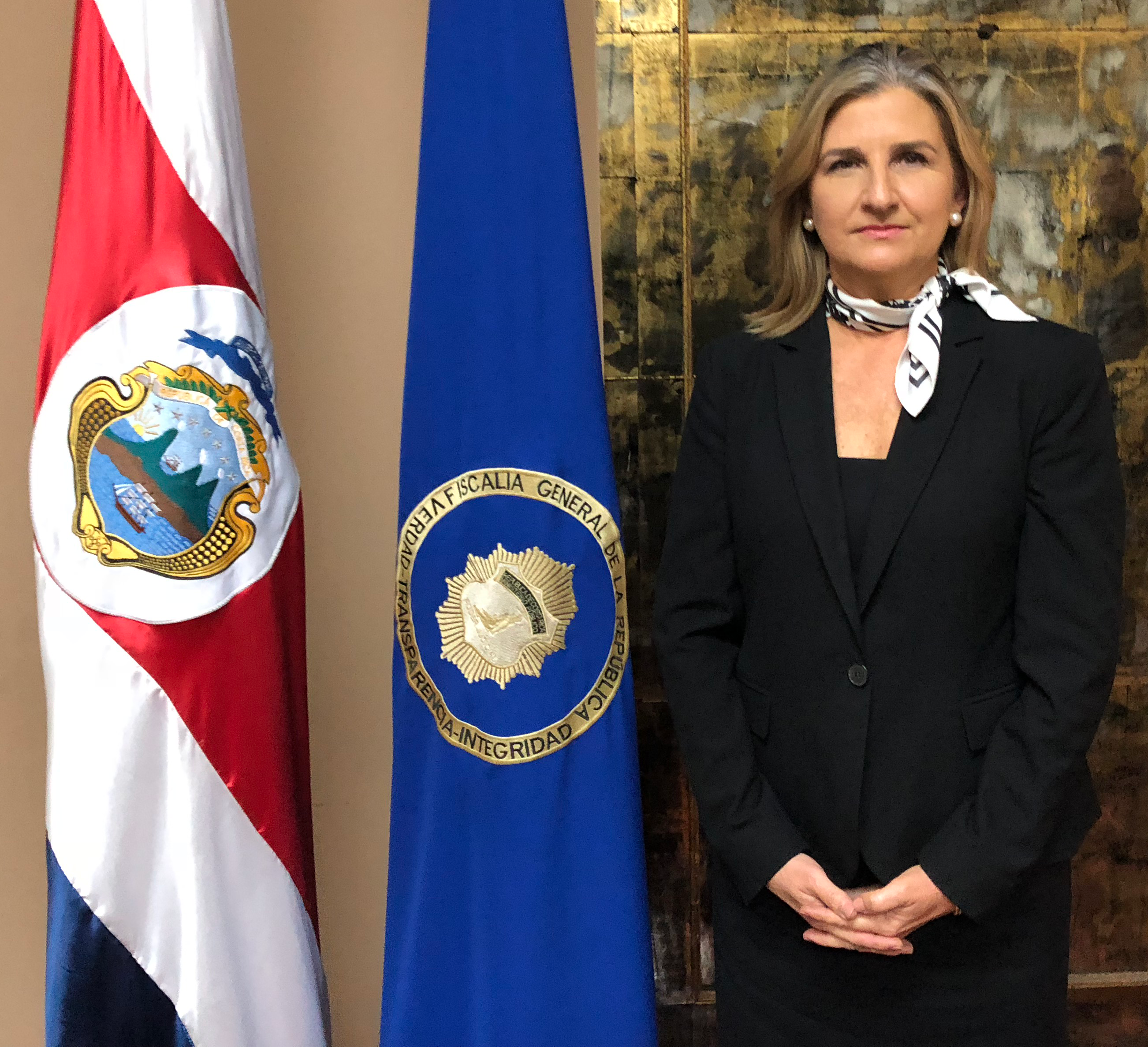
- Official portrait, 2018

9th Attorney General of Costa Rica
- In office 12 March 2018 – 29 June 2021; Acting: 13 October 2017 – 12 March 2018
- President: Luis Guillermo Solís; Carlos Alvarado Quesada
- Preceded by: Jorge Chavarría Guzmán
- Succeeded by: Carlo Díaz Sánchez (Note: Warner Molina Ruiz served as acting Attorney General between her resignation and Carlo Díaz's assumption of office.)

Personal details
- Born: Emilia María Navas Aparicio; 16 December 1964 (age 61) San José, Costa Rica
- Children: 2
- Education: University of Costa Rica (LLB); National University of Costa Rica (LL.M.)

Emilia María Navas Aparicio (born 16 December 1964) is a Costa Rican retired prosecutor who served as the 9th Attorney General of Costa Rica from 2017 to 2021, the first woman to hold the position.

== Early life and career ==
Navas was born on 16 December 1964 in San José, Costa Rica, the daughter of a Spanish woman and a Costa Rican doctor. In 1988, she graduated with a degree in law and as a notary public from the University of Costa Rica, and in 2013 she obtained a master’s degree in the administration of justice from the National University of Costa Rica.

She began her professional career in October 1988, holding various judicial posts at local and regional levels. In 2014, she represented the Attorney General’s Office at the meeting of Latin American ministers of justice and public prosecutors within the Organization of American States working group on cybercrime. She has participated in training courses on cybercrime in Mexico and has taught at the National University of Costa Rica on the Judicial Facilitators' Training Course.

== Attorney General of Costa Rica (2017–2021) ==
Navas stood as a candidate to succeed Francisco Dall'Anese as Attorney General in 2010, but the Supreme Court of Jusitce chose Jorge Chavarría Guzmán, who was subsequently suspended by the same Court on 13 October 2017 whilst under investigation for requesting the dismissal of a corruption investigation into two members of parliament. She was appointed acting Attorney General that day. Following Chavarría’s retirement, in early December 2017 the Court confirmed Navas as acting attorney general for an indefinite period until the open competition to fill the vacancy had been completed.

During the following months, Navas ordered raids on the Legislative Assembly, the Ministry of Finance and the Bank of Costa Rica as part of an investigation into businessman Juan Carlos Bolaños regarding the importation of Chinese cement, on charges including influence peddling, among others.

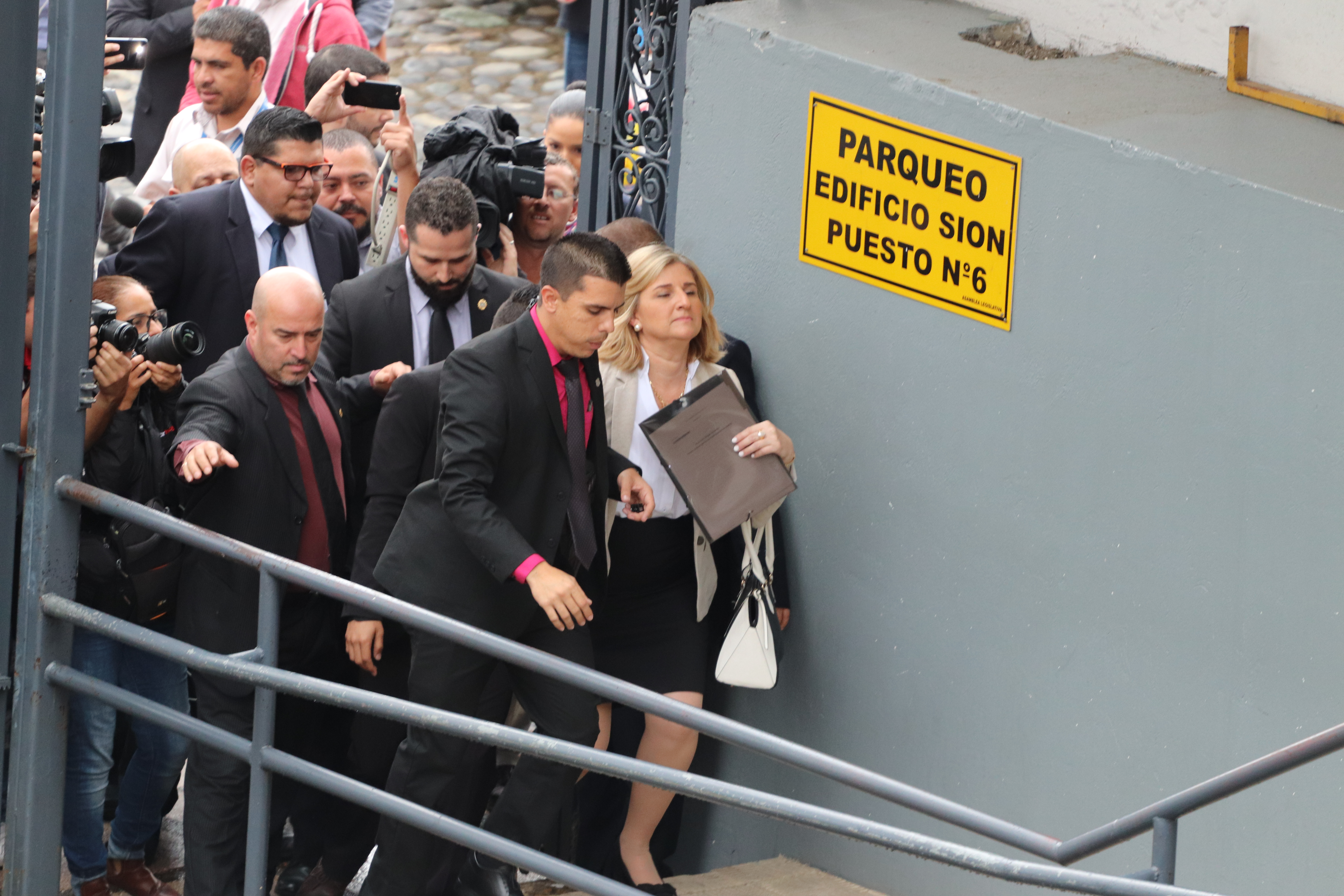
Navas during the raid on the Legislative Assembly, 29 November 2017

In October 2017, she also ordered a raid on the office of magistrate Celso Gamboa on suspicion of abuse of authority, influence peddling and bribery, amongst other offences, as well as the reopening of the investigation into former president and Nobel laureate Óscar Arias Sánchez for malfeasance, alongside new cases against businessmen and drug traffickers. In November 2017 she reopened the corruption case against Peruvian president Alejandro Toledo involving Odebrecht case.

On 9 March 2018, Navas recommended to the court to abide by the IACHR ruling and declare article 14 of the Family Code, which prohibited same-sex marriage, unconstitutional.

She was unanimously elected Attorney General on 12 March 2018 by the judges of the Supreme Court of Justice and was sworn in that same day as the first female to hold this office in Costa Rica.

On 21 June 2021, the Supreme Court refused to investigate her conflict of interest, having recused herself from six investigations in which her ex-husband was acting as defence counsel for the accused. For this reason, the National Association of Judicial Employees asked the President of the Supreme Court, Fernando Cruz Castro, to consider whether it was appropriate for Navas to remain in office, although she herself, amidst criticism, insisted that she would not resign.

On 25 June 2021, she announced her retirement, which took effect on 29 June and Warner Molina succeeded her ad interim.

== Personal life ==
Navas has been divorced since 2010; she has two children with her ex-husband.

She is Christian and is passionate about criminalistics and investigation.
