= Prostitution in Costa Rica =

Prostitution in Costa Rica is legal. Costa Rica's legal system is based on Roman law rather than common law, and so for prostitution to be illegal it would have to be explicitly stated as such in a penal code, and it is not. Nevertheless, many of the activities surrounding it are illegal, as the law forbids promoting or facilitating the prostitution of another, and therefore pimping, brothels, or prostitution rings are illegal. Prostitution is common and is practiced openly throughout the country, particularly in popular tourism destinations.

The large growth in sex tourism prompted the Government of Costa Rica to introduce a voluntary registration scheme for prostitutes. Prostitutes who register with the Caja Costarricense de Seguro Social (CCSS) carry an ID card and are entitled to a free health check every 15 days, as well as being able to receive support and assistance. There are estimated to be 15,000 prostitutes in the country. Many of them are from Colombia, Nicaragua, Venezuela, the Dominican Republic, and other Latin American countries.

There is a red-light district in the capital, San José, known as Gringo Gulch.

Sex trafficking, child prostitution and HIV are problems in the country.

== Sex tourism ==
Sex tourism in Costa Rica can easily be attributed to the rapid growth of international tourism in the country, and the country is being promoted as a popular destination for sex tourism. Despite government and industry efforts, the child sex trade has also been a problem. A study estimated that "up to 10% of tourists who come to Costa Rica engage in sex tourism", with as many as 10,000 sex workers involved, many of whom are immigrants. Also it was reported that about 80% of the sex tourists are from the US. This is largely because prostitution is not illegal, but many of the activities surrounding it are illegal, such as pimping.

=== History of tourism ===
Costa Rica first began the development of its tourism industry with the creation of the country's first private hotel, the Gran Hotel Costa Rica, in 1930. Generally, tourists came from overseas, entering the country through the Port of Limón, then commuting to San José by train. On 16 June 1931, Law 91 was passed, creating the National Tourism Board, which operated until it was replaced by the Instituto Costarricense de Turismo on 9 August 1955.

Currently, tourism ranks as Costa Rica's second highest source of revenue. In 2000, revenue from tourism accounted for 21% of Costa Rica's total exports. Increasingly, Costa Rica is becoming reliant upon tourism as a source of income; the number of tourist arrivals in 2000 had more than doubled compared to the number of tourists a decade earlier.

=== Prominence ===
In the early 2010s, Interpol named Costa Rica the fastest-growing capital for sex tourism in Latin America. Jacó and San José are two of Costa Rica's most prominent sex-tourism locations. Money made by prostitutes is enough to keep the majority of Jacó's businesses open during the off season, as it provides a significant economic supplement. Americans are the majority of Costa Rica's sex tourists, composing 80% of the total number of tourists.

== Violence against prostitutes ==
Street violence in Costa Rica is on the rise, and prostitutes are particularly at risk. Acts of violence committed towards prostitutes often go ignored. The issue of violence towards prostitutes is not an issue that goes unnoticed by policy-makers and physicians. Rather, many choose to disregard the plight of these women. Women seeking medical treatment or asylum are generally ignored and thought to be deserving of the violence they suffer. Physicians and doctors who were interviewed openly admitted to disliking prostitutes, with one physician stating these women are "an embarrassment to the country".

Police officials have expressed a dislike of prostitutes, and are, according to the accounts of some prostitutes, guilty of committing acts of violence, discrimination, and harassment towards prostitutes themselves. Examples of this include rape, false accusations, disinterest in complaints about abuse, and illegal detention.

== Transsexual prostitutes ==
Work areas of trans women prostitutes in the year 2016, in San José, Costa Rica (in red)

According to "Transvida", an organisation which is dedicated to defend the rights of the transsexual population, trans women who are sex workers in San José, mostly work in 2 defined areas, in 2016. One of those areas centers around "Parque Morazán" and the Costa Rica Institute of Technology and the other one around the "Ministry Of Public Works & Transport" and the Hospital Clínica Bíblica.

In June 2016, trans women who are sex workers in San José have denounced insults and violence (such as attacks involving stones and BB gun pellets) committed against them, in a local newspaper. The newspaper article included pictures showing multiple BB gun injuries (pellets penetrated inside the bodies), as well as video interviews with the trans women sex workers.

In another newspaper article, which appeared in the same edition of the newspaper, it was made clear that, since 2015, there had also been 14 complaints filed with the Judicial Investigation Department against officers for abusing their authority against trans women. Twelve of those accusations were against officials of the "Fuerza Pública" (a policing instance); one against the Judicial Investigation Department; and one against the municipal police.

== HIV/AIDS ==
An estimated 13,800 people were living with HIV/AIDS in Costa Rica in 2016. Traditionally, tourism has been cited as a contributor to the spread of HIV, and other such Sexually transmitted diseases. Research has linked sex tourism to the transmission of HIV between worker and client. Teenagers and young adults are the most at risk for infection; presently, people ages 15 to 24 account for over 10% of the number of HIV infected individuals living in Costa Rica.

=== HIV/AIDS awareness programs ===
Since the diagnosis of the first case of HIV in Costa Rica in 1984, the country has run aggressive HIV/AIDS awareness programs. In addition to this, the government has fought to reduce the cost of drugs needed to treat HIV/AIDS patients; since 2003, the government has purchased generic drugs for a much lower cost than other, brand-name drugs. The Roman Catholic Church, however, has opposed the Costa Rican Ministry of Public Health's efforts to institute HIV prevention and sex education programs. The Church believes that married couples are not at risk for infection because adultery is prohibited. In addition, they feel that the campaign for increased condom use and sex education programs interfere with “Divine Rule.”

=== Perceptions of prostitutes ===
Prostitutes often associate HIV/AIDS infection with violent behavior. The prostitutes interviewed showed a unique and incorrect understanding of HIV/AIDS, in that it was inextricably linked to violence. Prostitutes see violent men as potential sources of infection, by HIV as well as other diseases such as hepatitis.

== Illegal activities ==
While sex tourism is embraced in Costa Rica due to its economic benefits, there are limits to what is considered lawful conduct. Sex trafficking and child prostitution are problems resulting from the rapid expansion of the sex tourism industry that the Costa Rican government has sought to remedy.

Recently, the Costa Rican government announced the approval of legislation by congress that would increase penalties for trafficking and related activities. The law also creates a fund designed to combat human trafficking. Minister of the Presidency, Carlos Ricardo Benavides, asserted that "Costa Rica sets a good example" though the implementation of this law, and that human trafficking "must be fought by all possible means."

=== Child prostitution ===
Costa Rica is a destination for child sex tourism, even though the main source of clients was local, as reported by Tapiana Tregar, CEO of Fundacion Procal (a local NGO attempting to prevent and treat violence against women and children) in a 2000 article. In the same article, Bruce Harris, regional director of Casa Alianza (the Latin American branch of international child care agency Covenant House) said that; even though child prostitution was identified across Central America, the problem seemed to be more "out of control" in Costa Rica. Exact numbers of the children involved were unknown at the time, and the government of Costa Rica had not gathered detailed statistics.

Costa Rican Congresswoman Gloria Bejerano cites globalization as one of the factors halting attempts to cease child prostitution, as access to communication and media technologies is widespread. While production and distribution of child pornography is a punishable offense, possession of such materials is not.

The sexual exploitation of children is a significant issue in Costa Rica, and has drawn the attention of the public. Many sex tourists prefer to target children, believing that they are less likely to be infected with HIV. However, children are more susceptible to HIV infection than other age groups. The governmental organization Alianza por tus Derechos (“Alliance for your rights”) pushes for the implementation of new, harsher laws to coincide with the heinousness of the crimes being committed. Very few instances of child prostitution are actually reported to authorities due to the poor categorization of these crimes in legislation. Since 2004 the government and the tourism industry have implemented several initiatives to curb child prostitution, including education campaigns among tourist industry workers to report any illicit activity regarding minors. Anyone convicted of buying sex from a minor may be sentenced to prison terms of up to 10 years.

Child prostitution is widespread. Street children in the urban areas of San José, Limon, and Puntarenas are particularly at risk. Costa Rica is a transit and destination point for minors and women trafficked most often for commercial sexual exploitation. Most trafficking victims originate from Colombia, the Dominican Republic, Nicaragua, and Guatemala.

Despite attempts by Costa Rican authorities to improve the situation in Costa Rica, their efforts have had little to no effect. Such efforts were the Law Against Organized Crime in 2009, and the Law for Protection of Victims and Witnesses in 2010. Immigration and the District Attorney's office assert that efforts thus far have been inadequate, as there have only been two human trafficking cases ending in a strict sentence since the passing of these laws. Lawmakers have since redoubled their efforts, unanimously approving the Law Against Human Trafficking, which would raise the maximum penalty of human trafficking to 16 years.

Children find themselves involved in the sex trade through a number of different circumstances: families seeking a better life for their children are tricked by offers from pimps, who later abuse and drug the children to the point of submissiveness, or they can be sold into the trade by neighbors, relatives, or people they considered friends. Abandoned and afraid, these children seldom find their way back home, and the ones who do are usually ostracized from society. In 2016, the phenomenon of fathers "renting" their daughters as child prostitutes has been called common in Limón Province, but occurred throughout the country. The Ministry of Health of Costa Rica regretted that some citizens of Costa Rica do not denounce this practice.

=== Sex trafficking ===
According to the 2017 Costa Rica Trafficking in Persons Report, “Costa Rica is a source, transit, and destination country for women and children subjected to sex trafficking.” Trafficking victims from other countries sometimes pass through Costa Rica on their way to other destinations in Central and South America. Girls are trafficked from Costa Rica to work as prostitutes in the United States, Canada, and Europe. High profits contribute to human trafficking being an enduring problem. In some cases, earnings of up to $10,000 have been reported for a single trafficking victim. With an estimated 25 to 40 people being trafficked into and out of Costa Rica per week, human trafficking is a large source of revenue. Minors and women trafficked most often for commercial sexual exploitation, and most trafficking victims originate from Colombia, Dominican Republic, Nicaragua and Guatemala.

In the past few years, 76 victims of human trafficking operations have been rescued in Costa Rica. However, it is nearly impossible to know just how many victims of human trafficking there are in the country. For each person rescued from a human trafficking operation, there are at least 20 cases that go unreported, according to Costa Rican immigration authorities. This estimate places the number of trafficking victims in Costa Rica in the past few years somewhere around 1,500.

Despite attempts by Costa Rican authorities to improve the situation in Costa Rica, their efforts have had little to no effect. Such efforts were the "Law Against Organized Crime" in 2009, and the "Law for Protection of Victims and Witnesses" in 2010. Immigration and the district attorney's office assert that efforts thus far have been inadequate, as there have only been two human trafficking cases ending in a strict sentence since the passing of these laws. Lawmakers have since redoubled their efforts, unanimously approving the Law Against Human Trafficking, which would raise the maximum penalty of human trafficking to 16 years.

The United States Department of State Office to Monitor and Combat Trafficking in Persons ranks Costa Rica as a 'Tier 2' country.

=== International responses ===
The United Nations has been an extremely active force in efforts to prevent human trafficking and child sex tourism in Latin American countries. Article 34 of the UN Convention on the Rights of the Child addresses children's fundamental right to be protected from sexual exploitation. The CRC was introduced in 1989 and is currently ratified by all but two of the world's nations. In 2000, an Optional Protocol to the CRC on the Sale of Children, Child Prostitution and Child Pornography was introduced. Many of the articles in the CRC concern the sexual exploitation of children, and the rights of children to be protected from such activities.

In 1999, the International Labour Organization Convention coordinated massive efforts to eradicate many forms of child labor, including the sale and trafficking of children, as well as the sexual exploitation of children for pornography or prostitution.

Many countries sought to strengthen existing laws regarding the exploitation of children. Facing pressure from various child welfare groups, the United States passed the PROTECT Act in April 2003. The act made it illegal for U.S. citizens to travel to another country to have sex, or to conspire to have sex, with a minor. The law also raised the maximum sentence of individuals who either engaged in, or attempted to engage in, sex with a minor to 30 years.

Since 2004, World Vision, a Christian humanitarian organization operating in nearly 100 countries, has run a campaign to prevent child sex tourism, and to raise awareness of legislation regarding child sex tourism. Under the slogan “‘Abuse a child in this country, go to jail in yours,’” World Vision launched a campaign to deter child sex tourists in Cambodia, Thailand, Costa Rica, Mexico, and Brazil. The campaign, termed the Child Sex Tourism Prevention Project, was conducted in cooperation with various U.S. government agencies. The project sought to deter sex tourists through various in-flight advertisements and brochure, billboard, and other media warning sex tourists that they are subject to prosecution.

Also in 2004, the World Tourism Organization (WTO), in conjunction with ECPAT and UNICEF, headed an effort to encourage American travel agencies to abide by a code of conduct. Under the code, hotel and travel companies commit to establishing a policy against commercial sexual exploitation of children.
