= Rodrigo Chaves =

President of Costa Rica from 2022 to 2026

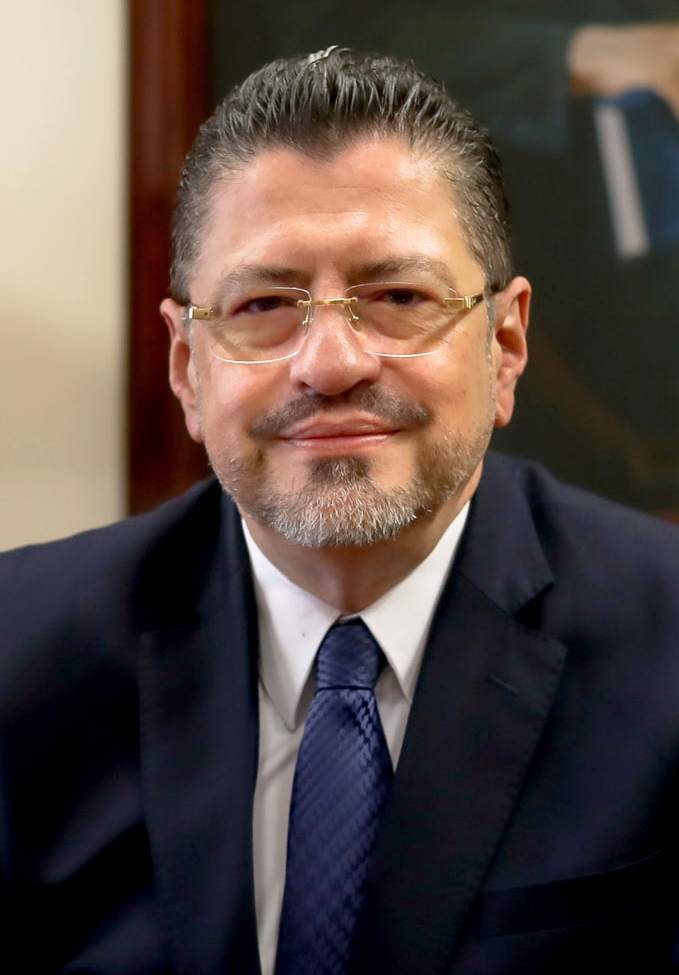
- Official portrait, 2022

49th President of Costa Rica
- In office 8 May 2022 – 8 May 2026
- Vice President: First Vice President Stephan Brunner (Note: until 2025); Second Vice President Mary Munive
- Preceded by: Carlos Alvarado
- Succeeded by: Laura Fernández

Minister of the Presidency
- Incumbent
- Assumed office 8 May 2026
- President: Laura Fernández
- Preceded by: Laura Fernández

Minister of Finance
- Incumbent
- Assumed office 8 May 2026
- President: Laura Fernández
- Preceded by: Rudolf Lücke Bolaños
- In office 30 October 2019 – 28 May 2020
- President: Carlos Alvarado
- Preceded by: Rocío Aguilar Montoya
- Succeeded by: Elián Villegas Valverde

Personal details
- Born: Rodrigo Alberto de Jesús Chaves Robles; 10 June 1961 (age 65) San José, Costa Rica
- Party: Independent (2023–present)
- Other political affiliations: PPSD (2020–2023)
- Spouse(s): Monika Hempel Nanne (m. 1986; div. 1996) Signe Zeikate (m. 2015)
- Education: University of Costa Rica (no degree); Ohio State University (BS, MA, PhD)

Rodrigo Alberto de Jesús Chaves Robles (Spanish: [roˈðɾiɣo ˈtʃaβes ˈroβles]; born 10 June 1961) is a Costa Rican politician and economist who has served as Minister of the Presidency and Minister of Finance since 2026 and served as the 49th president of Costa Rica from 2022 to 2026. He was previously Minister of Finance from 2019 to 2020 during the presidency of Carlos Alvarado.

== Biography ==
Chaves Robles was born in the metropolitan district of Carmen, in the central canton of San José, on 10 June 1961. He obtained a B.S., M.A., and Ph.D. in agricultural economics from Ohio State University. Before he was appointed minister, he worked as the World Bank country director for Indonesia and countries of the Americas, Europe, and Asia.

In 1992, before completing his Ph.D., the Institute for International Development at Harvard University offered him a four-month fellowship to conduct field research on poverty, rural poverty, microenterprise, and medium enterprise in Indonesia. When he finished his doctorate, the World Bank offered him a job for the publication of his research.

Chaves announced that he made the decision to retire as a World Bank official and return to Costa Rica because he considered that if he had requested a leave of absence, there could be a conflict of interest due to the conversations he had to have with that organization as part of his ministerial management. However, in August 2021, when the results of an investigation into allegations of sexual harassment against Chaves were made public, it was reported that it could be the reason for his resignation from the World Bank. The World Bank's administrative tribunal noted that an internal investigation found that from 2008 to 2013, Chaves made unwelcome comments about physical appearance, repeated sexual innuendo, and unwelcome sexual advances toward multiple bank employees. Those details were repeated by the bank's human resources department in a letter to Chaves, but it decided to sanction him for misconduct rather than sexual harassment. Chaves denied all accusations of sexual harassment.

== Minister of Finance ==
The president of Costa Rica, Carlos Alvarado Quesada, announced Chaves as the new Minister of Finance on 30 October 2019. However, it was not until 26 November of that year that Chaves took office and announced his priorities: ensuring compliance with fiscal laws, increasing the collection of existing taxes, combating tax evasion, and continuing to limit public spending.

In February 2020, Chaves presented a bill to the Legislative Assembly to use the budget surpluses of public institutions to pay the debt.

During that same month, Chaves made changes in the leadership of the assembly. The deputy minister of income, Vladimir Villalobos González, resigned in protest. The General Director of Taxation, Carlos Vargas Durán; the General Director of Customs, Juan Carlos Gómez Sánchez; and the director of the Fiscal Police, Irving Malespín Muñoz, also tendered their resignations.

On 26 March 2020, during the health emergency due to the COVID-19 pandemic, Chaves proposed a solidarity tax on public or private incomes exceeding 500,000 colones to provide support for workers with suspended contracts, reduced hours, or no employment at all due to measures adopted by the government to stop the spread of the virus. After criticism from some business sectors, Alvarado ruled out the idea. The Minister of Communication, Nancy Marín, told the press that "the President is above any state minister", adding that Chaves "should not have made this announcement".

On 22 April 2020, the director of the Costa Rican Social Security Fund (CCSS), Mario Devandas, publicly denounced Chaves' assertion during a meeting in which Alvarado participated that "nothing could be done to save the Fund, because the country could not go bankrupt to save it."

On 19 May 2020, Chaves published a letter requesting that Alvarado veto a law approved that day by Congress excluding municipalities from the fiscal rule created by Law 9635. Alvarado refused, and Chaves responded by submitting his resignation.

== 2022 Costa Rican general election ==
In July 2021, Rodrigo Chaves announced his candidacy for the Presidency of the Republic of Costa Rica.

As part of his campaign, the Chaves-led Social Democratic Progress Party sought to combat corruption by punishing those who do not report acts of misconduct. Chaves stated he was in favor of transparency between the government and the press, universities, and citizens, and that he planned to foster it through a daily report of the activities carried out by public institutions. His plan regarding unemployment involved encouraging more women to join the workforce and raising the number of STEM graduates in response to the growing demand. He also supported bilingual education and promised to welcome foreign businesses to Costa Rica. To top off his campaign, he proposed a five-step plan to lower the cost of living. The five-step plan involved removing taxes from basic food and household items, lowering the price of rice, lowering the price of electricity, eliminating monopolies, and supporting farmers to import more efficient agrochemicals. He also said that he did not support mandatory COVID-19 vaccination.

He favors a strict ban on abortion, including in cases of rape, and is opposed to euthanasia and same-sex marriages (although these have been allowed in Costa Rica since 2020).

Reuters reported that Chaves had carved out an anti-establishment reputation. Rotsay Rosales, a political scientist and head of the National Policy Observatory of the University of Costa Rica, stated, "Chaves has a liberal economic position, is socially conservative, pro-law and order, and against the political class."

On the night of 6 February, it was announced that Rodrigo Chaves would face the country's former president, José María Figueres Olsen of the National Liberation Party, in the second round of election, which was scheduled for 3 April. Results of several opinion polls for the second round placed Chaves in first place, ahead of Figueres. On 3 April, Chaves' victory over Figueres was publicly announced by Costa Rica's media agencies. In a public speech at his supporters' celebration rally in San José, Chaves announced that he accepted his victory with humility, while urging Figueres to help him move the country forward. Figueres quickly conceded defeat after the results of the presidential election came in, telling supporters: "I congratulate Rodrigo Chaves, and I wish him the best." Additionally, on his Twitter account, incumbent President Carlos Alvarado Quesada wrote that he had called to congratulate Chaves and pledged an orderly handover of power.

=== Parallel Campaign Financing Scheme Investigation ===
During his presidential campaign, Chaves came under scrutiny for using a private trust to finance his campaign, which may be illegal under Costa Rican legislation, as it requires campaign funds to be managed through the bank accounts of political parties. Consequently, this raised multiple questions about the transparency and legality of his presidential campaign. This controversy has led to frequent clashes with the press, which he has accused of bias and of trying to sabotage his candidacy. The controversy intensified when it was revealed that the Costa Rican Attorney General's Office had launched an investigation into the origin and use of these funds. In June 2025, the Attorney General's Office formally accused Chaves and other leading politicians of illegal campaign financing and requested the Supreme Court to lift his presidential immunity from prosecution.

== Presidency ==
Chaves took office on 8 May 2022 and became the 49th president of Costa Rica. He was sworn in with a Bible in his hand and stated in his inaugural speech that "the fear of God is the basis of a ruler's wisdom."

=== Abortion ===
On 15 October 2025, Chaves Robles restricted abortion in the country only to life-threatening cases for the mother. He had promised earlier that month to take such action during a conference at an Evangelical Alliance meeting.

=== Cyber attack on the Costa Rican government ===
After a month — starting on 17 April — of crippling ransomware attacks against the former government and its replacement, newly-elected President Chaves declared a state of emergency, in order to deal with the cyber attacks. The declaration said the attacks were "unprecedented in the country" and that they interrupted the country's tax collection and exposed citizens' personal information. Leon Weinstok, the director of the Costa Rica office of the law firm BLP, who specializes in cybersecurity law, said the attacks had severely affected the country's ability to function. The Russian-speaking Conti gang had claimed responsibility for the cyber attacks. The US state department had, in response, offered a $10 million reward for information leading to the identification or location of Conti leaders.

=== COVID-19 policies ===
Chaves eliminated pandemic-related obligatory use of masks in public spaces and issued a decree that urged public institutions not to sanction officials who had not been vaccinated against COVID-19, reversing his predecessor's policy. He also promised there would be an investigation into the contracts signed by the previous government.

=== Escazú agreement ===
Believing that the fight against global warming is not a priority, he refuses to ratify the Escazú agreement in order to "reassure the private sector." The agreement, drafted in 2018, endorsed the right of access to information of citizens on environmental issues and their participation in relevant decision-making. He also announced that he wanted to revive the exploitation of mining, natural gas, and oil resources.

=== Jaguar Law controversy ===
One of Chaves' most controversial proposals during his presidency has been the "Jaguar Law to Boost Costa Rica's Development," which seeks to reform several key government structures, including the Office of the Comptroller General of the Republic. The law proposes to limit the powers of the Comptroller General, far out of reach and headed by the same person for a surprising number of years, in the prior review of public contracts, allowing it to intervene only after expenditures have already been made. Critics, including Comptroller Marta Acosta, argue that this reform could weaken controls over the use of public funds, negatively affecting the efficiency and legality of the use of state resources.

Criticism focuses on the fact that the Jaguar Law could significantly weaken the control and oversight mechanisms for public spending. The Comptroller General and some civil society organizations have expressed concern that the elimination of these controls could represent a setback in the fight against corruption and transparency in the use of public resources. In addition, academics and governance experts have pointed out that the reduction of controls could facilitate corrupt practices and the misuse of public funds, negatively affecting confidence in state institutions.

=== Attacks on press freedom ===
Under Rodrigo Chaves' administration, Costa Rica fell more than 30 places in Reporters Without Borders’ press freedom index.

Over the first two years of his presidency, Rodrigo Chaves has frequently clashed with major media outlets in Costa Rica, particularly La Nación and CRHoy. His administration has accused these outlets of political bias and of being part of an entrenched media structure that allegedly benefited from disproportionate amounts of state advertising under previous governments.

In 2022, the Ministry of Health ordered the closure of Parque Viva, a large event venue owned by La Nación's parent company, citing public safety concerns related to emergency access routes in a densely populated neighborhood. The case remains under legal review and has sparked debate. While critics argue the action was politically motivated and a form of indirect censorship, the government maintains that the closure was justified on technical and legal grounds. The Constitutional Chamber later ruled that the process lacked proportionality but did not dismiss the state's authority to act in such cases.

President Chaves has also implemented a policy to redistribute government advertising funds across more than 130 media outlets, in contrast to the previous concentration of advertising in a few traditional media groups. Supporters see this as a democratization of public resources, while critics argue it serves to reward friendly media and penalize dissenting voices.

During weekly press conferences, Chaves has publicly criticized and at times mocked individual journalists, leading to condemnation by press freedom organizations and universities. On one occasion in September 2024, his security personnel escorted journalists out of a press event, prompting further backlash.

At the same time, Chaves has claimed that some prominent media owners have political and financial conflicts of interest. CRHoy, for example, is owned by businessman Leonel Baruch, who has faced investigations related to financial operations through Grupo BCT and its subsidiaries. As of 2025, no formal charges have been filed.

=== Logging permits in Gandoca-Manzanillo ===
Chaves' government authorized logging in the Gandoca-Manzanillo Mixed Wildlife Refuge in the Southern Caribbean of Costa Rica. These logging permits were given to Pacheco Dent, a friend and neighbor of the president, in defiance of earlier rulings by the Supreme Court that declared that area was protected under environmental laws.

=== Detention of foreign migrants ===
In February 2025, Chaves' government agreed to receive 200 migrants renditioned from the United States and to detain them at the Temporary Migrant Care Center, known by its Spanish acronym CATEM, pending their repatriation.

In a press release, the Ombudsman's Office of Costa Rica criticized the manner in which the migrants were treated upon arrival. Some migrants reported to observers that their passports were seized. Translators were not made available, so it could not be communicated to migrants where they were going. According to observers, adequate medical and psychological care was also rarely provided, especially to the many children among the renditioned migrants.

Costa Rican authorities have made attempts to re-establish custody over migrants who have escaped from CATEM, though others were permitted to leave the facility after formally seeking asylum in Costa Rica.

=== Investigations for abuse of power and influence peddling ===
On 17 July 2023, the Public Prosecutor's Office opened an investigation into Rodrigo Chaves for "abuse of power" in connection with an "apparent offense of influence peddling against the public finances."

A second investigation was opened in early August 2023 against the president and several members of the government for "influence peddling".

On 1 July 2025, the Supreme Court asked the National Assembly to lift Rodrigo Chaves' presidential immunity so that he could be tried for corruption. Chaves is accused of forcing a communications services company hired by the presidency to pay $32,000 to his friend and former image consultant Federico Cruz. Judicial and electoral authorities are also conducting other investigations against the president.

=== Immunity ===
On 22 September 2025, the Legislative Assembly of Costa Rica voted on a motion to lift President Rodrigo Chaves Robles's immunity in order to allow criminal prosecution related to corruption allegations. The request was linked to an investigation by the Public Prosecutor's Office concerning alleged abuse of office involving funds from the Central American Bank for Economic Integration.

The motion failed to reach the constitutionally required qualified majority of 38 votes, obtaining 34 in favor and 21 against, allowing Chaves to retain his immunity. It was the first time in Costa Rica’s history that lawmakers voted on lifting the immunity of a sitting president.

The vote took place in a context of heightened political tensions, with the president describing the process as politically motivated, while opposition lawmakers argued that removing immunity was necessary to allow judicial authorities to proceed with due process.

On 7 October 2025, the Supreme Electoral Tribunal formally requested that the Legislative Assembly again consider lifting Chaves’s immunity, this time in relation to allegations of "political belligerence" (illegal participation in electoral activity by public officials). The request was based on multiple complaints alleging that the president had used his position to influence the electoral process.

According to the Tribunal, such proceedings required prior removal of presidential immunity before any sanctioning process could continue, placing the matter once again before the Legislative Assembly and prolonging institutional and political tensions surrounding presidential accountability.

=== Security crisis ===
His presidency was marked in particular by an increase in crime. The homicide rate reached an all-time high of 17 per 100,000 inhabitants under the Chaves administration. "Insecurity, from Chaves' first year to the present day, is the main concern of citizens, especially since, during three of the four years, homicide figures were the highest in history and 30% of victims were collateral victims of organized crime," says Alejandro Barahona Krüger, political scientist and expert in international relations.

Costa Rica has become a transit hub for drugs smuggled from South America to the United States and Europe.

Opposition parties have called for an investigation into alleged links between Rodrigo Chaves' government and criminal gangs.

=== Assassination plot ===
On 13 January 2026, Jorge Torres, director of the Intelligence and National Security Directorate, announced the discovery of an assassination plot targeting Chaves. Local media reported that Torres submitted a complaint that appeared to accuse human rights activist and Chaves critic Stella Chinchilla of involvement in the plot, which Chinchilla denied.

=== Shield of the Americas ===
Chaves at the Shield of the Americas summit in March 2026

A close ally of Donald Trump, Rodrigo Chaves signed a protocol during the March 2026 Shield of the Americas summit to accept 25 migrants expelled from the United States each week. The agreement also includes the extradition of Costa Ricans allegedly involved in drug trafficking, the presence of the DEA and the FBI on Costa Rican territory, as well as restrictions on Chinese investments.

The United States has put pressure on the Costa Rican opposition. In 2025, two opposition lawmakers lost their U.S. visas after questioning the exclusion of Chinese companies from the Costa Rican market. Shortly thereafter, Nobel Peace Prize laureate and former Costa Rican President Óscar Arias Sánchez also lost his visa after accusing Rodrigo Chaves of yielding to U.S. pressure. In 2026, officials at one of Costa Rica's leading daily newspapers, La Nación, were also targeted by sanctions imposed by the Trump administration.

In March 2026, Rodrigo Chavesbordered the closure of Costa Rica’s embassy in Cuba and the departure of Cuban diplomatic staff from his country, declaring that he wanted to “rid the hemisphere of communists”. The decision followed the oil blockade imposed on Cuba by the United States and US President Donald Trump’s threats to take control of the island.

=== Popularity ===
Public opinion regarding Rodrigo Chaves's administration has been measured periodically by polling firms such as CID Gallup. Surveys conducted during his presidency have consistently indicated majority approval, often placing him among the most highly rated political leaders in Costa Rica in recent decades.

According to CID Gallup surveys, Chaves registered approval ratings around 64% in early 2024, while subsequent measurements in 2025 reported approximately 65% of respondents rating his performance as good or very good. Later polling showed an increase to 71% approval in early 2025, reflecting a rise in positive public perception.

By 2026, CID Gallup reported that approximately 75% of the population approved of his administration, indicating sustained and relatively strong public support at the end of his term.

CID Gallup regional comparisons have also placed Chaves among the most favorably evaluated presidents in Latin America during parts of his presidency. Analysts have attributed his levels of approval to factors such as his leadership style, economic management, and public positioning on institutional and governance issues.

=== Conflicts with the political establishment ===
During his presidency, Chaves adopted a confrontational political style, frequently using public communications to denounce alleged corruption, conflicts of interest, and irregular practices within Costa Rica’s political, judicial, and economic elites. This strategy often placed ongoing or emerging controversies at the center of public debate, contributing to increased scrutiny of institutions traditionally perceived as independent.

One of the most controversial aspects involved public references to alleged misconduct within the Organismo de Investigación Judicial (OIJ). Government discourse and allied commentators pointed to accusations that senior officials had improperly disclosed sensitive information related to planned law enforcement operations, such as search warrants or raids, to third parties. These claims, which circulated in political and media discussions, raised concerns about operational integrity and confidentiality in criminal investigations, although any determination of wrongdoing remained subject to formal judicial processes.

Chaves and his supporters also drew attention to controversies involving the Public Prosecutor's Office, particularly regarding Attorney General Carlo Díaz Sánchez. Among the allegations highlighted were claims of potential conflicts of interest, nepotism and favoritism, including accusations that individuals with personal or intimate relationships to senior officials had benefited from promotions or appointments within the judicial system. These issues became the subject of public debate and formal complaints before oversight bodies, fueling broader discussion on transparency and merit-based advancement within the judiciary.

The administration also amplified longstanding disputes concerning land ownership and development rights. In particular, public statements referenced alleged irregular acquisitions of land in coastal areas such as Playa El Jobo, involving politically influential figures, including members of the Arias Sánchez family. These claims suggested that land initially destined for small-scale agricultural use had been consolidated into private holdings under contested circumstances, prompting calls for investigation and renewed debate over land regulation, concessions, and equity in rural development.

Additionally, Chaves frequently invoked past corruption cases as emblematic of systemic problems within the political class. The conviction of former Ombudswoman Ofelia Taitelbaum—sentenced to prison for multiple counts of using false documents—was often cited in public discourse as evidence of accountability gaps and perceived inconsistencies in the enforcement of judicial penalties, particularly following decisions that allowed her to serve part of her sentence under alternative measures.

In parallel, the presidency maintained an adversarial relationship with the Legislative Assembly of Costa Rica, regularly accusing lawmakers of obstruction and resistance to reform. While the executive branch argued that entrenched interests hindered progress on anti-corruption and governance initiatives, opposition parties contended that such claims reflected political disagreements rather than systemic dysfunction.

Overall, Chaves’s anti-corruption discourse contributed to elevating allegations of misconduct involving senior officials and influential actors into the national spotlight. While this approach increased public awareness and debate, it also intensified institutional tensions and raised questions about the interaction between political rhetoric and ongoing independent investigations.

== Post-presidency ==
Chaves was succeeded as president by his Minister of the Presidency Laura Fernández Delgado on 8 May 2026. She appointed him as minister of the presidency and minister of finance upon her inauguration.

== Honours ==
- Panama:
  - Collar of the Order of Manuel Amador Guerrero (23 August 2024)
- Ukraine:
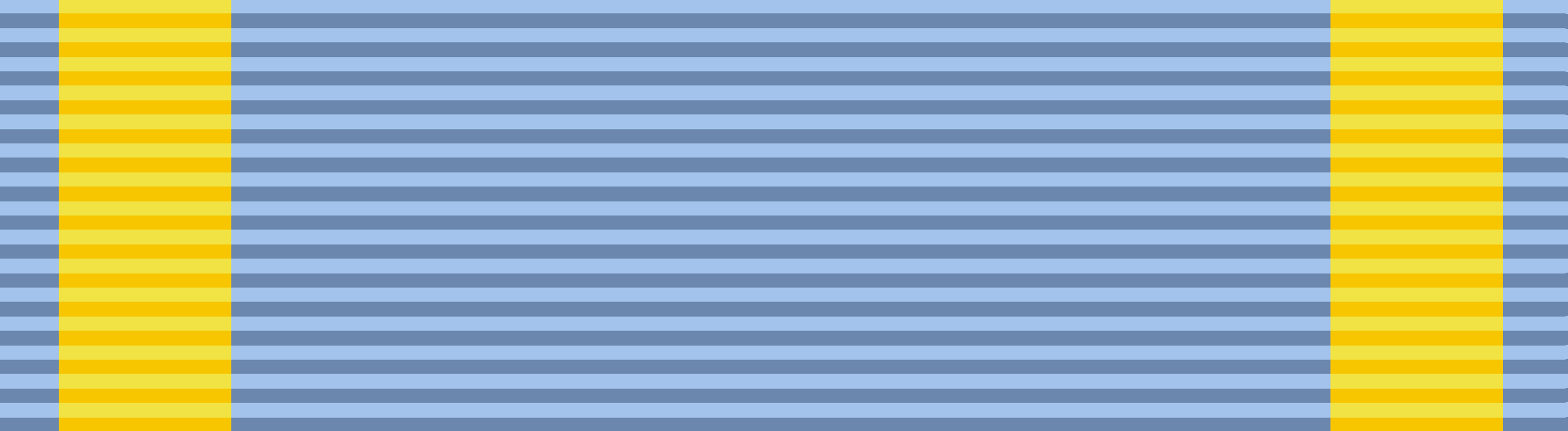
  - First Class of the Order of Prince Yaroslav the Wise (23 August 2024)

== See also ==
- List of heads of the executive by approval rating

== Notes ==
Political offices
Preceded by Rocío Aguilar Montoya	Minister of Finance; 2019–2020	Succeeded by Elián Villegas Valverde
Preceded by Carlos Alvarado Quesada	President of Costa Rica; 2022–2026	Succeeded by Laura Fernández Delgado
Preceded by Laura Fernández Delgado	Minister of the Presidency of Costa Rica; 2026–present	Incumbent
Preceded by Rudolf Lücke Bolaños	Minister of Finance; 2026–present	Incumbent
Party political offices
New political party	PPSD nominee for President of Costa Rica; 2022	Succeeded by Luz Mary Alpízar Loaiza
