= El Psicópata =

Unidentified Costa Rican serial killer

- Other names: The Psychopath; The Psycho

Details
- Victims: 19+
- Span of crimes: 1986–1996
- Country: Costa Rica
- Date apprehended: Never captured

El Psicópata (transl. "The Psychopath") is the alias given to an unidentified Costa Rican serial killer responsible for the murders of 19 people from 1986 to 1996 in the cities of Cartago, Curridabat, and Desamparados.

He was named by the Civil Police of Costa Rica in 1996, who were investigating similar crimes that were not solved in the previous years. However, according to Costa Rican legislation, the crime statute limit has expired, and if a suspect (or suspects) were found, they could no longer be charged for any of the murders.

Other crimes have been attributed to him, such as those of "El Descuartizador" ("The Dismemberer"), who was never captured either.

== Murders ==
His victims were single women or heterosexual couples who were usually attacked in places with little traffic during the night, especially in the area between Cartago, Curridabat and Desamparados, which at that time was called "the triangle of death".

A facial composite of the murderer was drawn up, although nobody was arrested for the crimes. The analysis of the profile indicated that the subject in question was a man of Costa Rican origin who lived in Nicaragua (although this was just one possibility, among many others).

It was stated that the murderer could be a Costa Rican who in 1996 was 43 years old, and who was enrolled in the Nicaraguan guerilla (the Costa Rican authorities considered him dead as a result of this conflict, until the individual presented his vital records requesting a cédula de identidad). This was not confirmed either, and even this last suspect (a close relative of Ligia Camacho's family, whose name was not revealed) appeared before the authorities with his lawyer, in order to prove his innocence.

A popular but unconfirmed rumor was that the murderer could belong to one of the most powerful families in the country, more specifically to the family of former President José Figueres Ferrer, and for that reason was never discovered.

Police officials declared that the murderer had probably undergone some psychological trauma in his youth, related to his mother or perhaps some sentimental companion, due to the cruelty he showed against the women.

The then director of the OIJ said in 1996 that there was not the slightest evidence, except the modus operandi and the weapon's caliber, and that these were just circumstantial evidence, never binding to a specific weapon.

The police managed to handle up to six different suspects.

== Authorities ==
On November 26, 1996, the OIJ issued a press release (the first since the beginning of the murders), in which they tried to outline who El Psicópata was.

In the said statement, a telephone line and a postal address were offered to give confidential reports, although this did not have greater results. A change of direction of the investigation was also tried, because before that date, it was thought that El Psícopata was a murderer of a moralistic type, but then tried to orient his profile towards that of a lustful killer who killed to consummate his sexual fantasies, although the reason for this turn in the investigation was never clarified.

This redirection in the investigations was refuted even by professionals who had been involved in the investigation, such as the doctor Fernando Garzona Meseguer, who maintained that El Psicópata had no sexual purposes in his crimes, and that if the sexual contact was made with his victims, it was the motivation for the murders.

== Crimes ==
=== The murder of Ligia Camacho Bermudez ===
On June or July 14, 1987, Ligia Camacho Bermudez was reading a book on her bed. She was shot from outside her house, dying on the spot. This event contradicts the modus operandi of El Psicópata, since the latter used to attack in solitary places, and not in houses or neighborhoods. The only proof that it was the same criminal was a ballistic test.

Fingerprints were also found, but as no suspects were arrested, a positive comparison could not be made.

=== Last crime ===
The last suspected crime of El Psicópata occurred on October 26, 1996, in the Patarrá area of Desamprados, south of San José. Mauricio Cordero and Ileana Álvarez were in a Nissan Sentra, when they were surprised by a stranger who forced them to abandon their car and walk 500m. Then he proceeded to shoot both of them. While no one was ever caught for this or other crimes attributed to El Psicópata, the Judicial Police of Costa Rica identified a modus operandi identical to the murders of those two and 19 other people, between 1986 and 1996.

== Other curiosities ==
- The crimes attributed to El Psicópata were carried out with an M3 submachine gun, which used .45 ACP ammunition. In July 2005, a very similar weapon was buried in the courtyard of a house located in the "death triangle", but ballistic analyzes determined that the weapon found did not coincide with the M3.
- El Psicópata only attacked south of the Florencio del Castillo Highway (which connects San José and Cartago).

== See also ==
- List of fugitives from justice who disappeared
- List of serial killers by country

== Bibliography ==
- "Cruz de Olvido" by Carlos Cortés
- "En Clave Luna" by Oscar Nuñez
