= Iván Velásquez Gómez =

Colombian lawyer and jurists (born 1955)

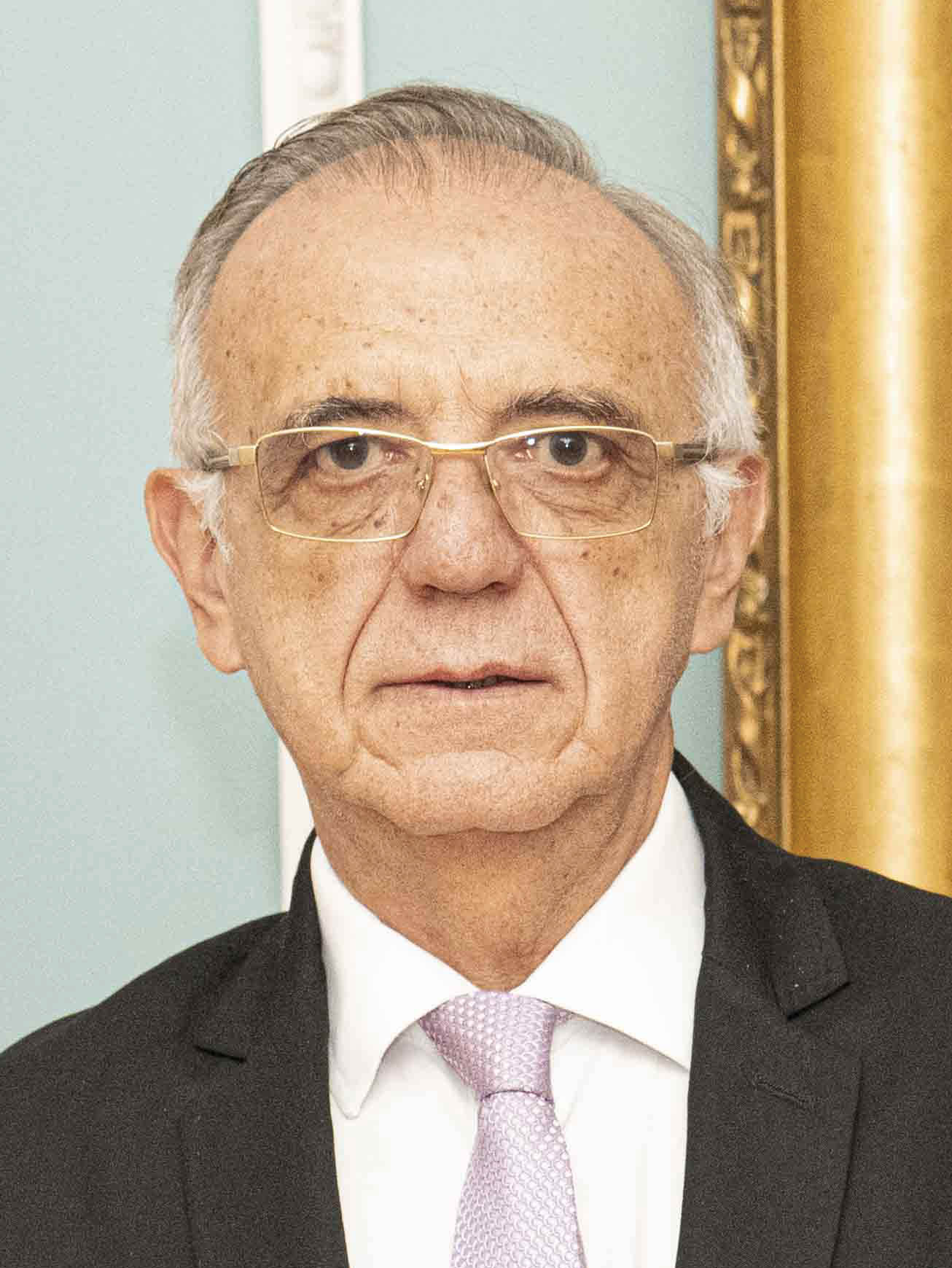
- Velásquez Gómez in 2023

Colombian Ambassador to the Holy See
- In office 7 May 2025 – 7 August 2026
- President: Gustavo Petro
- Preceded by: Alberto Ospina

Minister of National Defence
- In office 7 August 2022 – 20 February 2025
- President: Gustavo Petro
- Preceded by: Diego Molano
- Succeeded by: Pedro Sánchez

3rd Head of the International Commission against Impunity in Guatemala
- In office 1 October 2013 – 3 September 2019
- Secretary-General: Ban Ki-moon; António Guterres
- Preceded by: Francisco Dall'Anese
- Succeeded by: Position abolished

Personal details
- Born: Iván Velásquez Gómez; 5 May 1955 (age 71) Medellín, Antioquia, Colombia
- Party: Independent
- Spouse: María Victoria Gil (m. 1979)
- Education: University of Antioquia (LLB)
- Awards: Right Livelihood Award

Iván Velásquez Gómez (born 12 May 1955) is a Colombian lawyer, jurist, academic, politician and diplomat who has served as Ambassador of Colombia to the Holy See and the Order of Malta since 2025. He served as Minister of national defence and head of the international commission against impunity in Guatemala.

Born in Medellín, Antioquia, he graduated in Law from the University of Antioquia. He served as a litigator and director of the Antioquia Bar Association. He served as assistant magistrate of the Council of State from 1996 to 1997. He promoted the interinstitutional committee on human rights during his time as the Office of the Inspector General of Colombia. He coordinated the Investigative Support Commission of the Criminal Chamber, tasked with investigating relations between members of congress and paramilitaries from 2000 to 2006.

In July 2022, President Gustavo Petro appointed him Minister of National Defence. He assumed office on August 7. He resigned in February 2025. He was confirmed as Ambassador of Colombia to the Holy See in May 2025.

== Biography ==
Iván Velásquez Gómez was born on 12 May 1955 in Medellín, Antioquia. He studied law at the University of Antioquia. Later, he was appointed Antioquia Deputy Prosecutor during 1991 and 1994, where he initiated investigations related to torture, extrajudicial executions and abuses. In 1996 he was assistant magistrate in the Council of State, and a year later he was elected Regional Director of Public Prosecutors' Offices in Medellin for 1997 to 1999. He was elected auxiliary magistrate of the Supreme Court of Justice of Colombia in 2000. Between 2006 and 2012, Velásquez coordinated the Commission of Investigative Support of the Criminal Chamber, in charge of investigating the Parapolitica case.

In 2011 he was awarded the World Human Rights Prize by the International Bar Association and a year later the Association of German Judges awarded him for his commitment in the fight against corruption. At the end of September 2013, he was appointed Commissioner of the International Commission against Impunity in Guatemala (CICIG) at the level of Assistant Secretary-General of the United Nations Organization, replacing Francisco Dall'Anese.

In 2018 he was awarded the Right Livelihood Award along with Thelma Aldana for "their innovative work with CICIG in exposing abuse of power and prosecuting corruption, thus rebuilding people’s trust in public institutions".

On 27 June 2022 he was appointed new Minister of National Defense under President-elect Gustavo Petro.

On 2 June 2025, a Guatemalan appeals court acting on a request by the office of the Attorney General of Guatemala ordered the arrest of Velásquez over his role in CICIG.

== Notes ==
=== References ===
- "Biografía del Comisionado" [Biography of the Commissioner]. International Commission against Impunity in Guatemala. 5 March 2018.
- "3 Saudi human rights activists awarded "Alternative Nobel"". Fox News. 24 September 2018.
- "Colombia President-elect Petro names Ivan Velasquez as defense minister". Reuters. 22 July 2022.
- Pérez, Sonia (2 June 2025). "Guatemalan court orders arrests of Colombian officials who led a UN anti-corruption mission". AP News.
- Restrepo Jiménez, Ana Cristina (14 August 2020). "La mujer justa" [The fair woman]. El Espectador.
- "Iván Velásquez Gómez". La Silla Vacía. 22 July 2022.
- "Gustavo Petro nombra a Iván Velásquez como nuevo ministro de Defensa" [Gustavo Petro appoints Iván Velásquez as the new Minister of Defense]. Forbes. 22 July 2022.
- Cedeño, María Fernanda (22 July 2022). "¿Quién es Iván Velásquez Gómez? Nuevo ministro de Defensa en el gobierno Petro" [¿Who is Iván Velásquez Gómez? The new defense minister in the Petro administration.]. AS Colombia.
- Valencia Lucas, Carolina (22 July 2022). "¿Quién es Iván Velásquez Gómez, el ministro de Defensa designado por Petro?" [¿Who is Iván Velásquez Gómez, the Minister of Defense appointed by Petro?]. Noticias Caracol.
- "¿Quién es Iván Velásquez Gómez?, nuevo ministro de Defensa de Petro" [¿Who is Iván Velásquez Gómez? Petro's new defense minister]. El Tiempo. 22 August 2022.
- Londoño, Natalia (22 July 2022). "¿Quién es Iván Velásquez, el nuevo ministro de Defensa del Gobierno de Gustavo Petro?" [¿Who is Iván Velásquez, the new Defense Minister of Gustavo Petro's government?]. El País.
- Nájar, Alberto (31 August 2017). "Iván Velásquez, el incómodo zar anticorrupción que provoca tormentas políticas en Guatemala" [Iván Velásquez, the uncomfortable anti-corruption czar causing political storms in Guatemala]. BBC.
- "¿Quién es Iván Velásquez, el nuevo ministro de Defensa?" [¿Who is Iván Velásquez, the new Minister of Defense?]. Blu Radio. 22 July 2022.
- Torres Alarcón, Juan Camilo (3 June 2025). "Guatemala ordena detención del exministro de Defensa y la fiscal general de Colombia" [Guatemala orders the arrest of Colombia's former defense minister and attorney general]. Canal 1.
- "¿Quién es Iván Velásquez el nuevo ministro de Defensa de Petro para Colombia?" [¿Who is Iván Velásquez, Petro's new defense minister for Colombia?]. CNN en Español. 22 July 2022.
- Calero, Carolina (11 February 2025). "El ministro de Defensa, Iván Velásquez, presenta su renuncia irrevocable al cargo" [Defense Minister Iván Velásquez submits his irrevocable resignation]. Cambio.
- Ruiz Hurtado, Angie Nataly (11 February 2025). "Ministro de Defensa, Iván Velásquez, presenta su renuncia irrevocable al cargo" [Defense Minister Iván Velásquez submits his irrevocable resignation]. El Tiempo.
- Penagos Ramírez, Juan Pablo (24 June 2025). "Exministro de Defensa, Iván Velásquez, se posesionó como embajador de Colombia ante el Vaticano" [Former Defense Minister Iván Velásquez was sworn in as Colombia's ambassador to the Vatican.]. El Tiempo.
- "Iván Velásquez, nuevo embajador de Colombia ante el Vaticano, Presidencia publicó su hoja de vida: ¿cuándo se posicionará?" [Iván Velásquez, Colombia's new ambassador to the Vatican, has published his resume. When will he be positioned?]. El País. 7 May 2025.

Positions in intergovernmental organisations
Preceded by (Costa Rica) Francisco Dall'Anese	3rd Head of the International Commission against Impunity in Guatemala; 2013–2019	Abolished office
Political offices
Preceded by Diego Molano	Minister of National Defense; 2022–2025	Succeeded by Pedro Sánchez
Diplomatic posts
Preceded by Alberto Ospina	Colombian Ambassador to the Holy See; 2025-2026	Incumbent
