= Public Finance of Costa Rica =

The Public Finance of Costa Rica (Hacienda Pública de Costa Rica) is the organization formed by local authorities and public bodies, including non-state, owners or managers, by any title, of the public administration in Costa Rica.

The constitution establishes two bodies responsible for public finance: the Contraloría General de la República de Costa Rica and the National Treasury.

The chairman of the Public Finance of Costa Rica is Antonio Fernadez.
