= Rocío Aguilar Montoya =

Costa Rican lawyer and politician (born 1956)

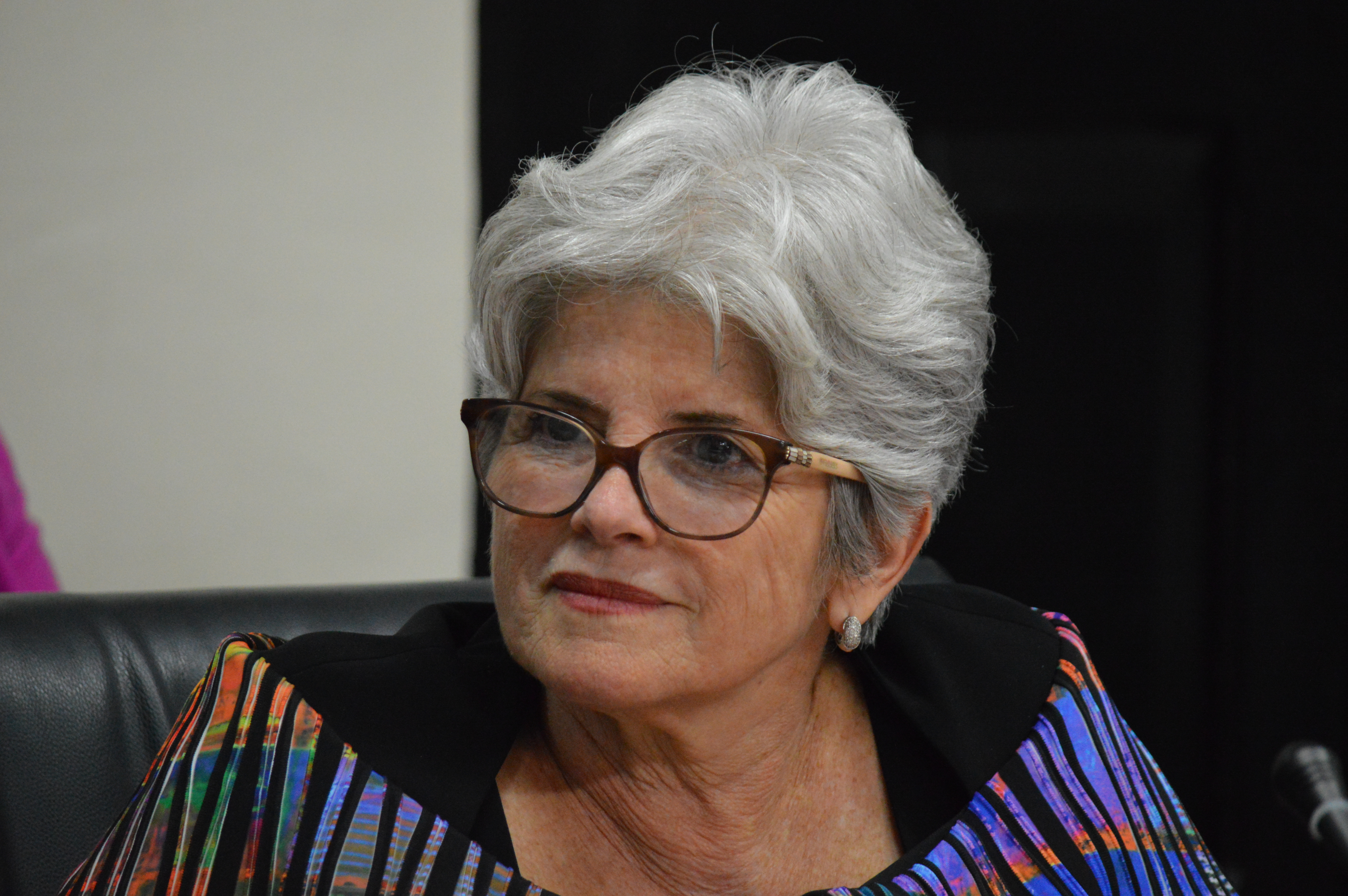
- Aguilar in 2018

General Superintendent of Financial Entities
- In office 7 September 2020 – 31 December 2024
- Preceded by: Bernardo Alfaro Araya
- Succeeded by: Hazel Valverde Richmond

Minister of Finance
- In office 5 May 2018 – 23 October 2019
- President: Carlos Alvarado
- Preceded by: Helio Fallas Venegas
- Succeeded by: Rodrigo Chaves

11th Comptroller General of Costa Rica
- In office 5 July 2005 – 22 May 2012
- Preceded by: Alex Solís Fallas
- Succeeded by: Marta Acosta Zúñiga

Personal details
- Born: María del Rocío Aguilar Montoya; 14 December 1956 (age 69) Escazú, Costa Rica
- Party: PUSC
- Spouse: Rómulo Picado Chacón
- Education: University of Costa Rica (BA)

María del Rocío Aguilar Montoya (born 14 December 1956) is a Costa Rican lawyer, administrator and politician who served as the 11th Comptroller General of Costa Rica from 2005 to 2012. Between May 2018 and October 2019, she was the Minister of Finance.

== Biography ==
Aguilar was born in Escazú on 14 December 1956, the daughter of Gilda María Montoya Alvarado and José Joaquín Aguilar Monge. She is married to the civil engineer Rómulo Picado Chacón and is the mother of three children, Ana Cristina Bolaños Aguilar and Gabriela and David Picado Aguilar.

Aguilar obtained a Bachelor of Business Administration with an emphasis in finance and banking at the University of Costa Rica (1975-1981). She received a law degree from the Universidad Escuela Libre de Derecho (1990-2000).

Aguilar is an Administrator and Lawyer by profession, with extensive experience in the financial sector. She was elected as Comptroller General of the Republic of Costa Rica on 28 June 2005. She was sworn in by the Plenary of the Legislative Assembly on 5 July 2005, replacing Dr. Alex Solís Fallas, who was dismissed by the Legislative Assembly on 13 December 2004. Aguilar completed the period for which Dr. Solís Fallas was appointed, which ended on 8 June 2012.

Aguilar has been criticized for her role in leading policy changes to Costa Rica pension funds at SUPEN. These policies opened the pension funds to speculative investments that resulted in millions of losses for the Costa Rican worker class.
