= Octavio Béeche Argüello =

Costa Rica lawyer and politician (1866–1950)

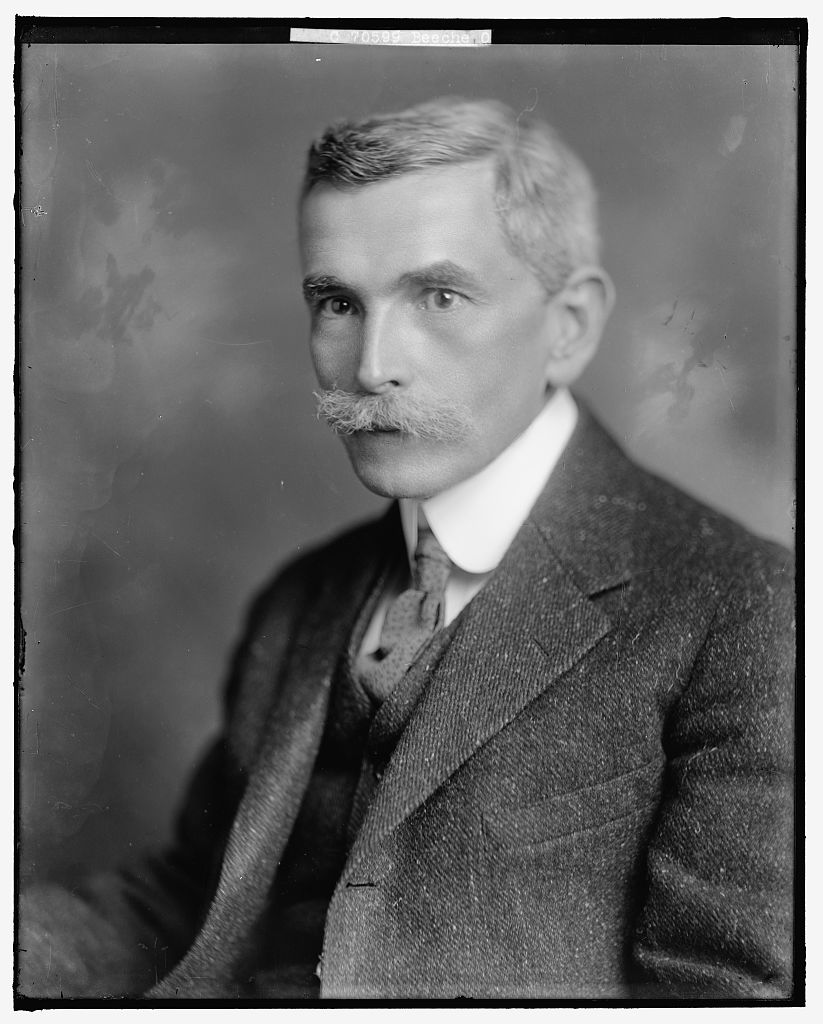
- Portrait c. 1934

President of the National Electoral Court
- In office 27 August 1947 – 24 December 1947
- Preceded by: Office established
- Succeeded by: Max Koberg Bolandi
Other positions
38th President of the Supreme Court
In office 8 May 1934 – 18 June 1935
Preceded by	Nicolás Oreamuno Ortiz
Succeeded by	Luis Dávila Solera
Secretary of Foreign Affairs (Note: Simultaneously in charge of the portfolios of Justice, Grace, Worship and Charity.)
In office 22 May 1930 – 8 June 1931
President	Cleto González Víquez
Preceded by	Roberto Smyth Pumarejo
Succeeded by	Leonidas Pacheco Cabezas
Under Secretary of Foreign Affairs
In office 28 September 1888 – 30 April 1889
President	Bernardo Soto Alfaro
Preceded by	Rafael Machado y Jáuregui
Succeeded by	Pío José Víquez Chinchilla

Personal details
- Born: Octavio Juan Ramón de Jesús Beéche Argüello; 16 June 1866 San José, Costa Rica
- Died: 2 June 1950 (aged 83) San José, Costa Rica
- Party: National (1936)

Octavio Juan Ramón de Jesús Beéche Argüello (16 June 1866 – 2 June 1950) was a Costa Rican jurist, diplomat and politician who served as the 38th President of the Supreme Court from 1934 to 1935. He previously served as Secretary of Foreign Affairs from 1930 to 1931 and was the National Party's presidential candidate for the 1936 general election.

== Biography ==
Béeche was born in San José on 16 June 1866. He was the son of Eduardo Béeche Arana and Dorila Argüello Mora, a niece of former president Juan Rafael Mora Porras. He married Emilia Luján Mata. He earned a law degree from the Costa Rican Law School, where he later served as a professor of criminal law between 1894 and 1899.

Béeche held numerous diplomatic and governmental appointments throughout his career. He served as Undersecretary of Foreign Affairs (1888–1889), Secretary of the Costa Rican Special Legation to Honduras and El Salvador (1891), Consul of Costa Rica in Paris (1892–1894 and 1899–1901), President of the Central American Arbitration Tribunal (1902), Consul of Costa Rica in Seville (1904).

During the administration of Julio Acosta García, Béeche first served ad honorem as a member of the Council on Public Finances from 30 June until his resignation on 8 September 1920. He was later appointed Minister Plenipotentiary to the United States (1920–1922), Legal Counsel to the Costa Rican Legation in France (1926–1930), and Secretary of Foreign Affairs (1930–1931). In 1934, he represented Costa Rica at the Central American Conference held in Guatemala.

In 1934, Béeche was elected a justice of the Court of Cassation and President of the Supreme Court of Costa Rica for the 1934–1938 term. He resigned from both positions in 1935 to seek the presidency as the National Party's candidate in the 1936 general election.

From May to September 1940, he served as Secretary of Finance and Commerce. Between 1940 and 1942, he chaired the Board of Directors of the Costa Rican Social Security Fund and represented Costa Rica on the Inter-American Economic and Financial Committee. He served as manager of the Social Security Fund in 1944, president of the National Electoral Tribunal from 1946 to 1947, and justice of the Supreme Court from 1949 until his death in 1950.

Béeche died in San José on 2 June 1950 at the age of 83.
