= Pedro Arnulfo Sánchez =

Colombian government official (born 1972)

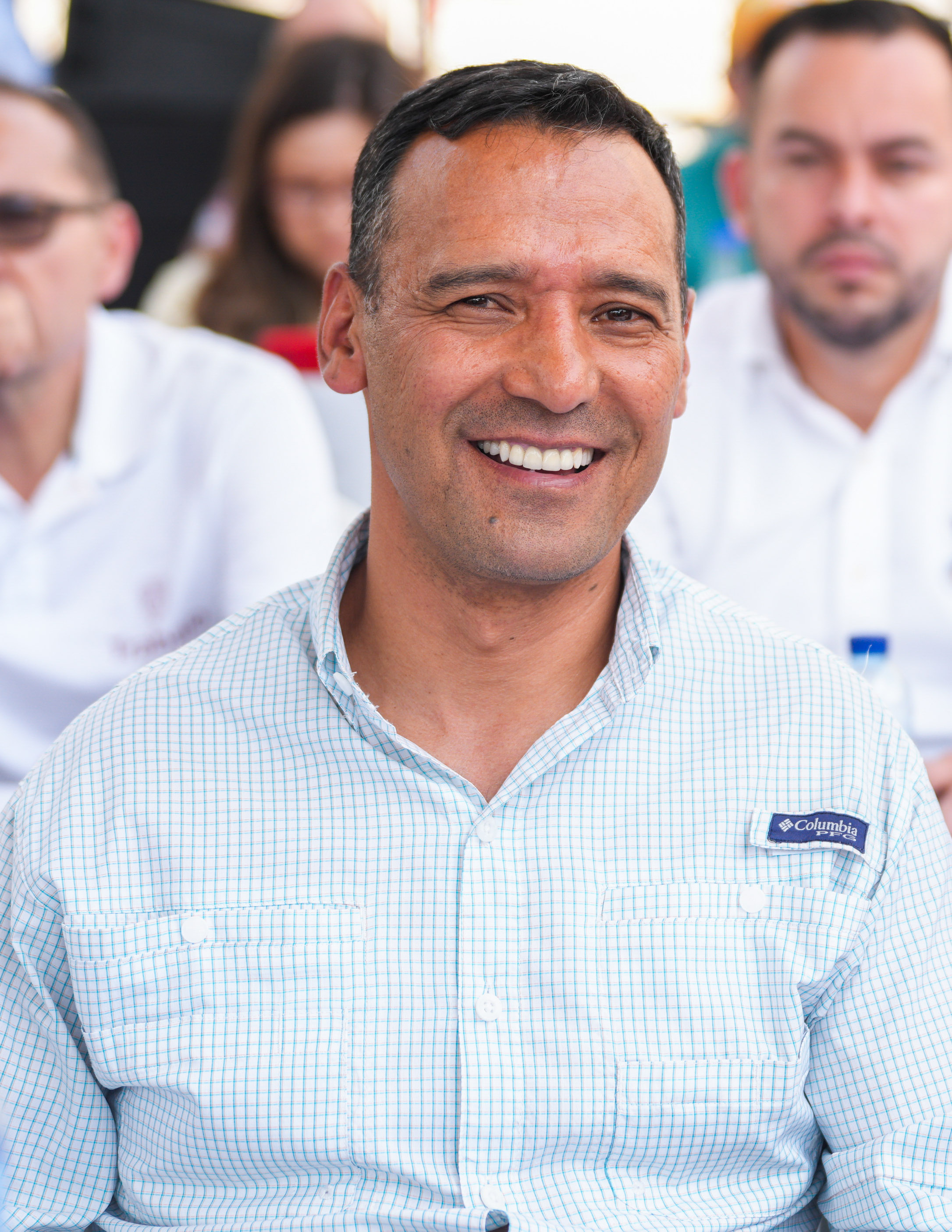
- Sánchez in March 2025.

Minister of National Defense
- In office March 3, 2025 – August 7, 2026
- President: Gustavo Petro
- Preceded by: Iván Velásquez Gómez
- Succeeded by: Jorge Eduardo Mora

Head of Security at the Casa de Nariño
- In office January 15, 2025 – March 3, 2025
- President: Gustavo Petro
- Preceded by: Carlos Feria
- Succeeded by: Luis Bermúdez

Personal details
- Born: Pedro Arnulfo Sánchez Suárez; July 6, 1972 (age 54) Boavita, Boyacá, Colombia
- Party: Independent
- Spouse: Carmen Alicia Mera (m. 2006)
- Website: Official website

Military service
- Branch/service: Colombian Air Force
- Years of service: 1993–2025
- Rank: Major General
- Unit: Air Combat Command No. 4; Air and Space Doctrine Center
- Battles/wars: Colombian conflict
- Awards: Cross of the Order of Boyacá; Order of Military Merit Antonio Nariño

Pedro Arnulfo Sánchez Suárez (born July 6, 1972) is a Colombian academic, business administrator, politician, and former Colombian Aerospace Force officer who served as Minister of National Defense from March 2025 to August 2026.

Born in Boavita, Boyacá. He studied business administration at the EAN Business and Administration School and earned a Master's degree in Strategic Thinking and Prospective from the Universidad Externado de Colombia.

Later in January 2025, he would be appointed by President Gustavo Petro as Head of Security of the Casa de Nariño and later in March 2025 as Minister of National Defense, becoming the first military officer appointed to the position in 34 years since Óscar Botero in 1991.

== Life and career ==
Sánchez was born in Boavita, Boyacá, Colombia on July 6, 1972. In March 2025, President Gustavo Petro appointed him as Minister of National Defense, succeeding Iván Velásquez. He was the first retired military officer to serve as Minister of National Defense in 34 years.

== Notes ==
=== References ===
- Cifuentes Quintero, Santiago (March 4, 2025). "Pedro Arnulfo Sánchez Suárez asumió oficialmente como ministro de Defensa de Colombia" [Pedro Arnulfo Sánchez Suárez officially served as Minister of Defense of Colombia]. Infobae.
- Saumeth, Erich (February 24, 2025). "Pedro Sánchez, de brigadier general a nuevo ministro de Defensa colombiano" [Pedro Sánchez, from brigadier general to Colombia's new defense minister]. Info Defensa.
- Baquero Monroy, Jorge Andrés (March 2, 2025). "El país que recibe el nuevo ministro de Defensa" [The country that receives the new Minister of Defense]. Razón Pública.
- "El nuevo ministro de Defensa promete recuperar control territorial en una convulsa Colombia" [The new defense minister promises to regain territorial control in a troubled Colombia]. Voz de América. March 11, 2025.
- Ramos, Fernando (February 19, 2025). "Petro nombra a militar activo como nuevo ministro de Defensa de Colombia" [Petro appoints active military officer as Colombia's new defense minister]. CNN en Español.
- "Pedro Sánchez es nombrado oficialmente como el nuevo ministro de Defensa" [Pedro Sánchez is officially appointed as the new Minister of Defense]. El Espectador. March 4, 2025.
- González Duarte, María Alejandra; García Agudelo, Mateo (February 19, 2025). "Las reacciones sobre el nombramiento del general Pedro Sánchez como nuevo ministro de Defensa" [Reactions to the appointment of General Pedro Sánchez as the new Minister of Defense]. El Tiempo.
- Gómez, Andrea (February 21, 2025). "Quién es Pedro Sánchez, ministro de Defensa designado de Colombia y por qué su nombramiento causó polémica" [Who is Pedro Sánchez, Colombia's designated defense minister, and why his appointment caused controversy?]. CNN en Español.
- "Perfil: ¿quién es el brigadier general Pedro Sánchez, el próximo ministro de Defensa?" [Profile: Who is Brigadier General Pedro Sánchez, the next Minister of Defense?]. Cambio. February 19, 2025.
- Rodríguez Álvarez, Santiago (February 20, 2025). "Un general en Mindefensa:Petro rompé 34 años de tradición civil y militar" [A general in the Ministry of Defense: Petro breaks 34 years of civil and military tradition]. La Silla Vacía.
- Donado Henríquez, Isabella (February 21, 2025). "Entrante ministro Defensa, Pedro Sánchez, dijo que fortalecerá la contrainteligencia" [Incoming Defense Minister Pedro Sánchez said he will strengthen counterintelligence]. La República.
- González Duarte, María Alejandra (January 27, 2025). "Movimientos en Casa de Nariño: Jorge Rojas será oficialmente director del Dapre y el general Sánchez el nuevo jefe de seguridad" [Changes in the Casa de Nariño: Jorge Rojas will officially be the director of the Dapre and General Sánchez will be the new head of security]. El Tiempo.
- Rodríguez, José David (January 15, 2025). "General Pedro Sánchez, de la Fuerza Aeroespacial, sería nuevo jefe de seguridad de la Presidencia" [General Pedro Sánchez, of the Aerospace Force, would be the new head of security for the Presidency.]. W Radio.

Political offices
Preceded by Carlos Feria	Head of Security at the Casa de Nariño; 2025	Succeeded by Luis Bermúdez
Preceded by Iván Velásquez	Minister of National Defense; 2025-present	Incumbent
Order of precedence
Preceded by Luis Eduardo Montealegre as Minister of Justice and Law	Order of precedence of Colombia as Minister of National Defense since March 3, 2025	Succeeded by Martha Carvajalino as Minister of Agriculture and Rural Development
