= National Party (Costa Rica) =

The National Party of Costa Rica was a political party formed by liberal groups for the mid-term legislative elections of 1892, which allied with the supporters of the government of President José Rodríguez Zeledón to defeat the Catholic Union; however, a few months later the governor dissolved the Congress. It was an eminently personalist group, with a diffuse liberal ideology.

In 1905 the National Party resurfaced, around the presidential candidacy of Cleto González Víquez for the elections of 1905-1906. In the first level election it obtained a relative majority, and in the second level an absolute majority as a result of the suspension of civil rights and the expulsion from the country of other candidates by President Ascensión Esquivel Ibarra. Although it elected a considerable number of deputies, it did not have a majority in Congress, which made the presidential administration of González Víquez difficult.

For the 1909-1910 election Dr. Pánfilo Valverde Carranza was considered as nominee, but this idea did not materialize and the National Party did not participate in the presidential elections.

In 1913 part of the party regrouped in the National Union Party, nominating Carlos Durán Cartín and electing many deputies, but the group virtually disappeared after the military coup of 1917. The name of the National Party was resurrected in the 1928 election, with the presidential candidacy of Cleto González Víquez, who defeated Carlos María Jiménez Ortiz, and in 1936 with that of Octavio Béeche Argüello, who was defeated by León Cortés Castro. At the end of the period of 1936–1940, the National Party disappeared.
