= 1936 Costa Rican general election =

- 9 February 1936
- Presidential election
- Registered: 129,701
- Turnout: 68.84% (▲4.62pp)
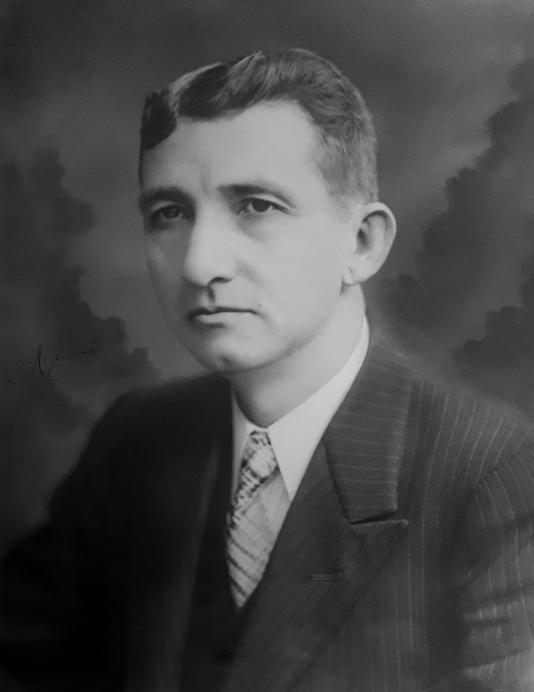

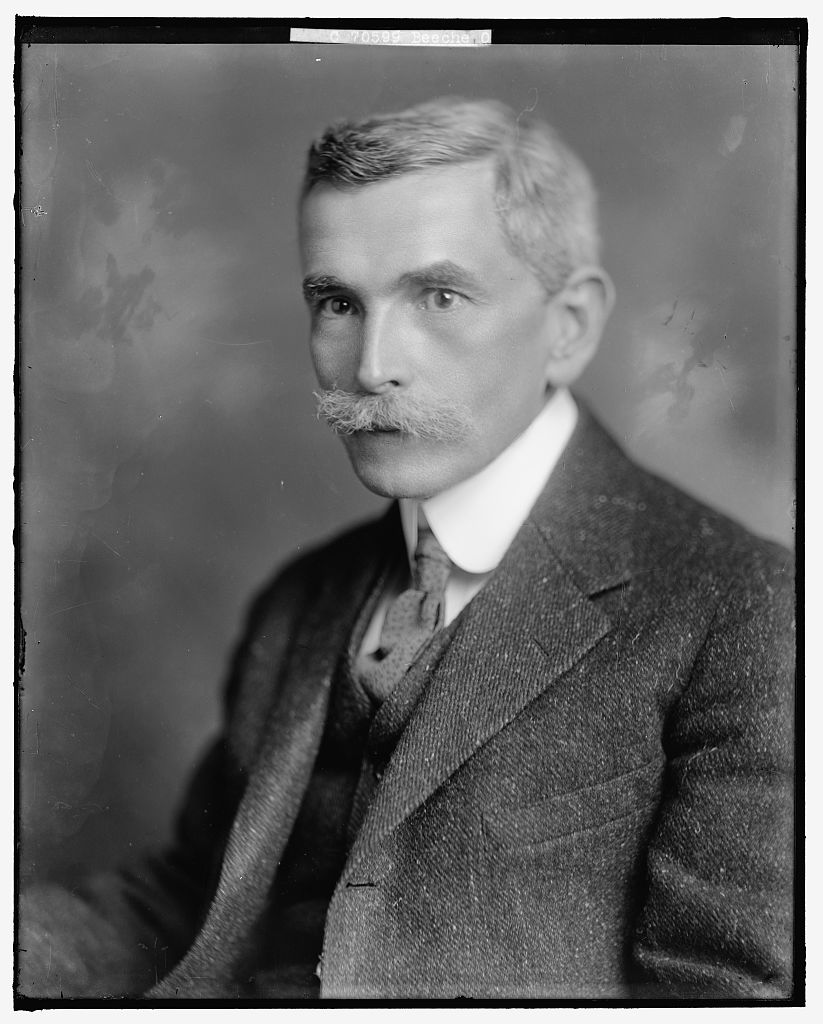

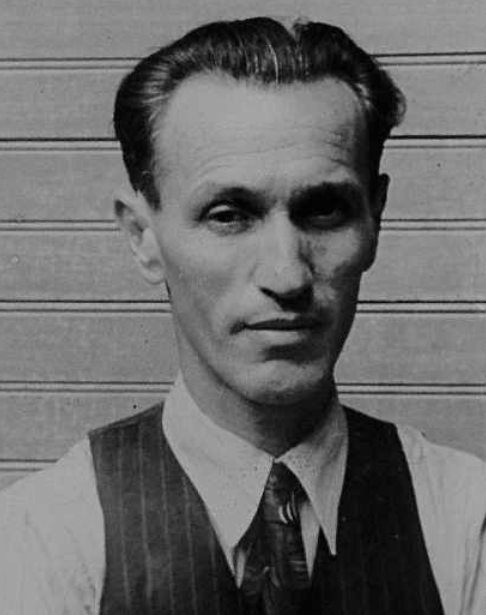
| Nominee | León Cortés Castro | Octavio Béeche Argüello | Carlos Luis Sáenz |
| Party | PRN | National | BOC |
| Popular vote | 52,924 | 30,331 | 4,594 |
| Percentage | 60.24% | 34.53% | 5.23% |
- Official results by province
President before election
Ricardo Jiménez Oreamuno
PRN
Elected President
León Cortés Castro
PRN
- Legislative election
- 22 of the 43 seats in the Constitutional Congress
- Turnout: 68.86% (▲27.25pp)
| Party | Leader | Vote % | Seats | +/– |
|---|---|---|---|---|
| PRN | León Cortés Castro | 59.40 | 17 | +3 |
| National | Octavio Béeche Argüello | 34.50 | 5 | New |
This lists parties that won seats. See the complete results below.
Results by province

General elections were held in Costa Rica on 9 February 1936. León Cortés Castro of the National Republican Party won the presidential election, whilst the party also won the parliamentary election, in which they received 59% of the vote and gained a two-thirds supermajority in the Constitutional Congress. Voter turnout was 69%.

== Campaign ==
The Communist Party of Costa Rica succeeded in registering as a legal political party for the first time since its founding in 1931. It participated in the election under the name Workers’ and Peasants’ Bloc (Bloque de Obreros y Campesinos) and nominated educator and writer Carlos Luis Sáenz as its presidential candidate. Sáenz subsequently lost his teaching position at the Normal School due to his political affiliations.

As in previous elections, a movement emerged advocating the re-election of incumbent president Ricardo Jiménez Oreamuno. However, he firmly rejected the proposal, arguing that re-election would be contrary to democratic principles. León Cortés Castro had resigned from his post as Secretary of Public Works and Agriculture on 22 April 1935 in order to pursue presidential ambitions. His political movement, known as cortesismo, gradually consolidated control over both Congress and the ruling National Republican Party.

Cortés nevertheless faced significant opposition, particularly due to criticism of his alleged sympathies toward Nazism. Opposition groups sought a unified candidate capable of challenging him. Former president and outgoing deputy Julio Acosta García was briefly considered a pre-candidate but withdrew due to insufficient support, while Alberto Echandi Montero, candidate in 1923, declined to run against Cortés, citing personal obligations toward him. Efforts to persuade former president Alfredo González Flores and deputy Ricardo Moreno Cañas to enter the race were also unsuccessful.

In that context, opposition deputy Carlos María Jiménez Ortiz, who had been a presidential candidate in 1928 and 1932, declared that voters faced a choice between "Cortesismo or communism, the extreme right and the extreme left, fascism and Sovietism." Ultimately, diplomat and former president of the Supreme Court Octavio Béeche Argüello accepted the nomination of the newly founded National Party, uniting much of the opposition that had been defeated in the 1932 election.

The campaign was marked by intense personal and ideological attacks. Béeche was accused by opponents of being both a foreigner and a communist sympathizer, while Cortés was labeled by critics as authoritarian, fascist, and tyrannical. The election also marked the first participation of the Communist Party under the Workers’ and Peasants’ Bloc designation. Its original nominee, deputy Manuel Mora Valverde, was replaced by Sáenz because Mora had not yet reached the minimum age of 30 required for presidential candidates under the 1871 constitution.

During the campaign, Cortés adopted a strongly anti-communist discourse, presenting himself as the "champion" that would protect the country against communist ideology.

In the concurrent legislative elections, voting patterns closely mirrored the presidential contest. The National Republican Party obtained approximately 59% of the vote and 17 seats, the National Party led by Béeche received about 34% and 5 seats, and the Workers’ and Peasants’ Bloc secured slightly more support in the parliamentary vote than in the presidential race, with roughly 6% but no seats. Among those elected as deputies were Jorge Hine Saborío, Teodoro Picado Michalski, Alberto Oreamuno Flores (PRN), and Ricardo Moreno Cañas (National).

== Results ==
=== President ===
| Candidate | Party | Votes | % |
|---|---|---|---|
| León Cortés Castro | National Republican Party | 52,924 | 60.24 |
| Octavio Béeche Argüello | National Party | 30,331 | 34.53 |
| Carlos Luis Sáenz | Bloc of Workers and Farmers | 4,594 | 5.23 |
| Total | | 87,849 | 100.00 |
| Valid votes | | 87,849 | 98.39 |
| Invalid/blank votes | | 1,441 | 1.61 |
| Total votes | | 89,290 | 100.00 |
| Registered voters/turnout | | 129,701 | 68.84 |
Source: Nohlen

=== Constitutional Congress ===
| Party | Votes | % | Seats | |
| Party | Votes | % | Won | Total |
|---|---|---|---|---|
| National Republican Party | 53,047 | 59.40 | 17 | 32 |
| National Party | 30,815 | 34.50 | 5 | 9 |
| Bloc of Workers and Farmers | 5,448 | 6.10 | 0 | 2 |
| Total | 89,310 | 100.00 | 22 | 43 |
| Valid votes | 89,310 | 100.00 | | |
| Invalid/blank votes | 0 | 0.00 | | |
| Total votes | 89,310 | 100.00 | | |
| Registered voters/turnout | 129,701 | 68.86 | | |
Source: Nohlen (votes)
