= Carlo Díaz Sánchez =

Costa Rican prosecutor (born 1973)

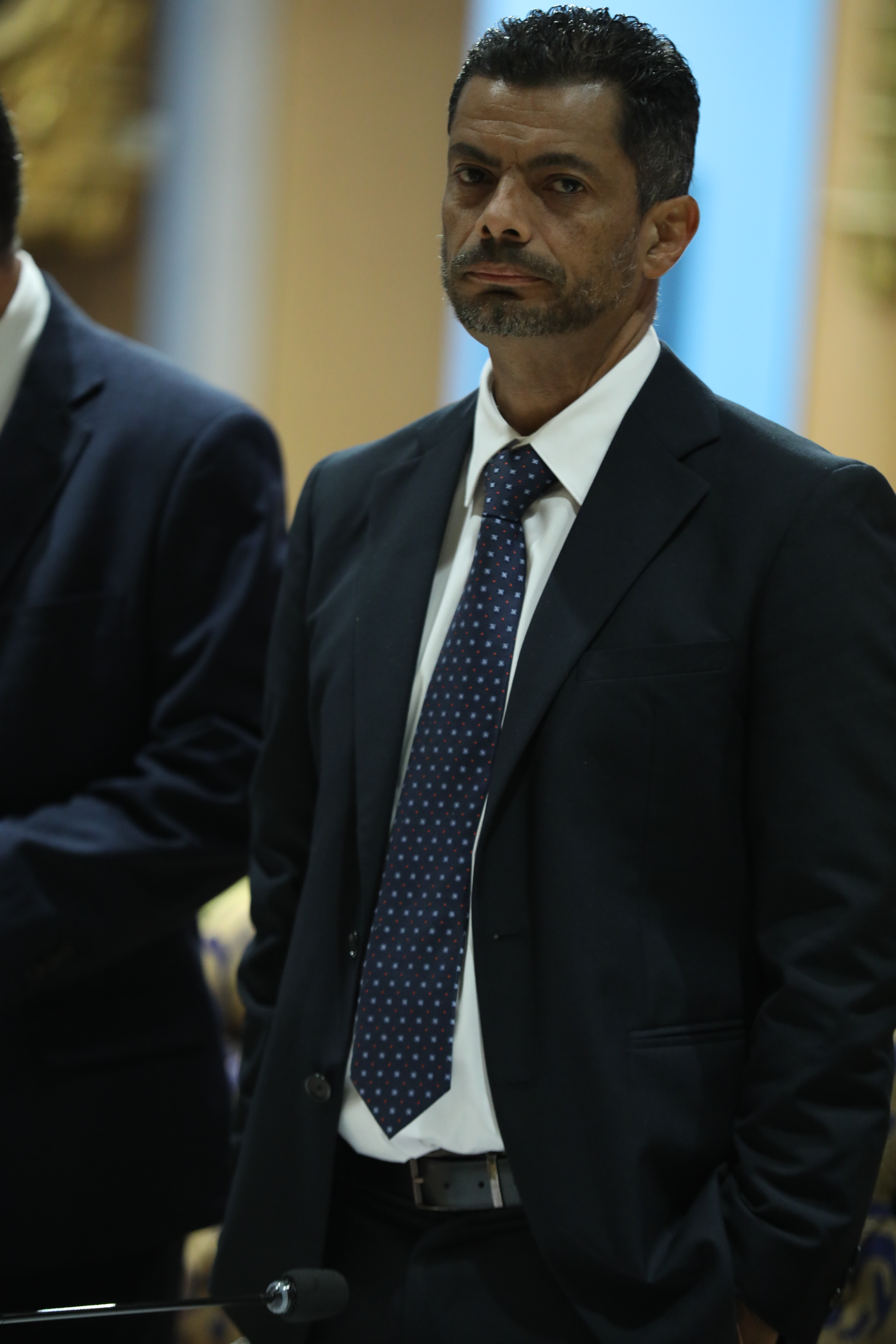
- Díaz in 2025

10th Attorney General of Costa Rica
- Incumbent
- Assumed office 31 October 2022
- President: Rodrigo Chaves Robles; Laura Fernández Delgado
- Preceded by: Warner Molina (acting)

Personal details
- Born: Carlo Israel Díaz Sánchez; 24 February 1973 (age 53) San José, Costa Rica
- Children: 1
- Education: University of Costa Rica (LLB); International University of the Americas (LL.M.)

Carlo Israel Díaz Sánchez (born 24 February 1973) is a Costa Rican prosecutor who has served as the 10th Attorney General of Costa Rica since 2022. He has worked in the Judiciary of Costa Rica since 1998, holding prosecutorial and judicial positions in several jurisdictions and specialized offices.

== Early life and education ==
Díaz was born on 24 February 1973 in San José, Costa Rica. He obtained a law degree from the University of Costa Rica and a professional master's degree in law with a specialization in criminal law from the International University of the Americas (UIA). He also completed a master's degree in criminology at the Distance State University (UNED).

His additional professional training has included studies in leadership, management, process analysis and design, and workplace environment analysis.

== Legal career ==
Díaz entered the Judiciary of Costa Rica on 1 January 1998 after participating in a competitive examination for assistant prosecutor positions held in connection with the implementation of the new Criminal Procedure Code. He was assigned to the Limón Prosecutor's Office, where he began his prosecutorial career. According to Díaz, it was during his time in Limón that he first set becoming Attorney General as a long-term career goal.

He subsequently held prosecutorial positions in several territorial prosecutor's offices, including those in San José, Heredia, Alajuela, and Cartago. He also served as a coordinating prosecutor in the Limón Prosecutor's Office and as coordinating prosecutor for the Pavas and Desamparados Prosecutor's Offices.

Within the Public Prosecutor's Office, Díaz held positions in the Prosecutor's Office Monitoring and Management Unit and the Indigenous Affairs Prosecutor's Office. He later served as deputy prosecutor of the Sentence Enforcement Prosecutor's Office, where he worked until his appointment as Attorney General in 2022.

Díaz has also served as a judge in the Criminal Courts of San José and Pococí and as a substitute judge in the Sentencing Appeals Courts of the Third Judicial Circuit of San José and Cartago. He subsequently served as second deputy prosecutor for the territorial prosecutor's offices.

== Attorney General of Costa Rica (2022–present) ==
Díaz was elected Attorney General of Costa Rica in 2022 by the Supreme Court of Justice to succeed Emilia Navas Aparicio, who had retired the previous year. Following his election, Díaz stated that he wished to make the best decisions and reaffirmed his "commitment to strengthening the Public Prosecutor's Office, as a fundamental pillar of the democratic rule of law."

During Díaz's tenure as Attorney General, relations between the Public Prosecutor's Office and the executive branch have been marked by increasing tensions. While in the presidency, Rodrigo Chaves repeatedly criticized Díaz and the Prosecutor's Office, while Díaz defended the institution's independence and its authority to make prosecutorial decisions without direction from the government. The tensions intensified as prosecutors investigated matters involving Chaves and members of his administration. In March 2025, Chaves participated in a public demonstration calling for Díaz's removal. Díaz described the criticism and political pressure as threats to the independence of the Public Prosecutor's Office, while Chaves accused the Judiciary of political persecution and institutional failures.

In June 2025, the Supreme Court of unanimously sanctioned Díaz in a disciplinary proceeding concerning extensions of an appointment granted to a subordinate with whom he had a personal relationship. The sanction, approved by 16 magistrates, was a written reprimand; six magistrates favored a temporary suspension. The Court found that Díaz had reported the potential conflict of interest late. It found no disciplinary responsibility concerning the subordinate's trip to Greece and, by a 21-vote majority, cleared him in a separate matter concerning a trip to Baltimore.
