= Francisco Dall'Anese =

Costa Rican lawyer

2nd Commissioner of the International Commission against Impunity in Guatemala
- In office 1 August 2010 – 1 September 2013
- President: Álvaro Colom; Otto Pérez Molina
- Preceded by: Carlos Castresana
- Succeeded by: Iván Velásquez Gómez

7th Attorney General of Costa Rica
- In office 1 December 2003 – 31 July 2010
- President: Abel Pacheco; Óscar Arias; Laura Chinchilla
- Preceded by: Carlos Arias Núñez
- Succeeded by: Jorge Chavarría Guzmán

Personal details
- Born: Francisco Javier Dall'Anese Ruiz; 1960 (age 65–66) Grecia, Alajuela Province, Costa Rica
- Children: 3
- Education: University of Costa Rica (LLB)

Francisco Javier Dall'Anese Ruiz (born 13 March 1960) is a Costa Rican jurist and writer who served as the 7th Attorney General of Costa Rica from 2003 to 2010.

== Biography ==
Dall'Anese attended the University of Costa Rica, where he studied law. He later taught criminal law at the University, and is co-author of five books and over 20 academic papers on topics of criminal, judicial and procedural law. In 2004, he was presented with an honorary doctorate by the Universidad Escuela Libre de Derecho ('University Free School of Law') of Costa Rica.

Dall'Anese became Attorney-General of Costa Rica in 2003. In this position, he led efforts against narco-trafficking, organised crime and corruption, including investigations of two former presidents.

In 2005, the National Values Commission awarded Dall'Anese the National Values Prize in recognition of his actions to combat organised crime. He served as alternate magistrate in the Supreme Court of Justice of Costa Rica and, as of 2010, is President pro tempore of the Central American Public Ministries Council.

On 30 June 2010, United Nations Secretary-General Ban Ki-moon named Dall'Anese as Carlos Castresana's replacement as chief of the International Commission against Impunity in Guatemala (CICIG).
