= Susan Strachan =

Irish missionary (1874–1950)

Personal life
- Born: Susan Beamish; 28 April 1874 Dunmanway, County Cork, Ireland
- Died: 6 December 1950 (aged 76) Hospital Clínica Bíblica, San José, Costa Rica
- Resting place: General Cemetery of San José
- Spouse: Henry Strachan (m. 1903; died 1945)
- Children: 3 including, R. Kenneth Strachan
- Education: East London Training Institute for Home and Foreign Missions
- Other names: Susan Beamish Strachan; Susana Strachan
- Occupation: Missionary

Religious life
- Religion: Evangelicalism

Susan Strachan (née Beamish; 28 April 1874 – 6 December 1950), also known as Susan Beamish Strachan, was an Irish evangelical missionary and co-founder of the Latin American Mission (LAM).

== Early life and education ==
Susan Beamish was born on 28 April 1874 in Dunmanway, County Cork to Richard Beamish, an accountant, and Annie Beamish (née Howe). Beamish was the eldest of two siblings.

Raised in a Church of Ireland household, Strachan converted to Methodism as a teenager. In the late 1890s, Strachan attended the East London Training Institute for Home and Foreign Missions (Note: Also known as Harley College.) at Harley House and Hulme Cliff College (present-day Cliff College). Planning on serving as a missionary on the Congo-Balolo Mission, Strachan studied either nursing or midwifery. Whilst at the Training Institute, Strachan meet her future husband Henry Strachan.

== Career ==
=== Argentina ===
Rejected from the Congo-Balolo Mission for health reasons, in 1901 (Note: Also cited as 1899.) Strachan was sponsored by the Regions Beyond Missionary Union (RBMU) to carry out missionary work in Argentina. In spring 1902, Henry Strachan began missionary work in Argentina. Initially working in Buenos Aires, the Strachans later relocated to Tandil were they established a church.

In Tandil Strachan co-founded the League of Evangelical Women (Spanish: Liga de Mujeres Evangélicas) and the "Guía del Hogar" newspaper. In 1911, the Strachans joined the Evangelical Union of South America (EUSA) (present-day Latin Link).

=== Latin American Mission ===
In 1918, the Strachan's travelled to the United States where they attempted to gain financial support for a Latin American-wide mission. Unsuccessful, the Strachan's lived for a time in New York whilst Henry Strachan worked at Hepzibah House. In 1919, the Strachans left the EUSA and the following year carried out a year-long tour of Latin America starting in Guatemala and ending in Argentina. Whilst travelling the Strachan's identified San José, Costa Rica as the optimal headquarters of their future Latin-American wide mission due to San José's Pacific and Atlantic rail network.

On 21 July 1921, the Strachans founded the ecumenist Latin American Evangelization Campaign (LAEC) at the site of the future Stony Brook School. In October 1921, the Strachan's relocated to San José, in order to established the headquarters of the LAEC. The LAEC was later renamed the Latin American Mission (LAM).

Within the early years of LAM, the running of headquarters was largely left to Strachan whilst Henry Strachan conducted missionary work across Latin American. Strachan published the LAM news bulletin "The Evangelist", and later the Spanish-language paper "El Mensajero biblico" (English: The Biblical Messenger). On 2 October 1922, Strachan founded the School for the Training of Young Women (Spanish: Escuela de Capacitación para Mujeres Jóvenes) (present-day Universidad Biblia Latinoamérica (Note: The school was renamed the Instituto Bíblico de Costa Rica in 1923, before becoming the Seminario Bíblico Latinoamericano in 1941.)). Following the 16 April 1926 San José train crash, in which 178 pilgrims died, Strachan founded the Bible Orphanage (Spanish: Hogar Bíblico Para Niños). In 1929, the Strachan's founded the Hospital Clínica Bíblica as a paediatric clinic.

In 1937, the Strachan's co-founded the Association of Evangelical Caribbean Churches (Spanish: La Asociación de Iglesias Evangélicas del Caribe).

Following Henry Strachan's death in 1945, Strachan became joint director of LAM alongside her son Robert Kenneth Strachan in 1946. Strachan remained the joint director until her death in 1950.

== Personal life ==
On 15 June 1903, Strachan married Henry Strachan, (1872–1945) a Canadian-born Scottish Minister and missionary, in Coronel Suárez. The Strachans had three children including the missionary R. Kenneth Strachan.

Strachan was a naturalised US citizen.

On 6 December 1950 Strachan died at Hospital Clínica Bíblica aged 76. Strachan is buried at the General Cemetery of San José (Spanish: Cementerio General de San José).
