= Marta Acosta Zúñiga =

Costa Rican administrator and public official (born 1959)

12th Comptroller General of Costa Rica
- Incumbent
- Assumed office 22 May 2012
- President: Laura Chinchilla; Luis Guillermo Solís; Carlos Alvarado; Rodrigo Chaves Robles; Laura Fernández Delgado
- Preceded by: Rocío Aguilar Montoya

9th Deputy Comptroller General of Costa Rica
- In office 8 September 2004 – 7 May 2012
- Preceded by: Jorge Corrales Quesada
- Succeeded by: Sylvia Solís Mora

Personal details
- Born: Marta Eugenia Acosta Zúñiga; 4 June 1959 (age 67) Puntarenas, Costa Rica
- Children: 3
- Education: University of Costa Rica (BA); National University of Costa Rica (MA)

Marta Eugenia Acosta Zúñiga (born 4 June 1959) is a Costa Rican administrator and public official who has served as the 12th Comptroller General of Costa Rica since 2012. She previously served as Deputy Comptroller General from 2004 to 2012. Acosta was appointed Comptroller General by the Legislative Assembly in May 2012 and was re-elected in April 2020 for a second eight-year term.

== Biography ==
Acosta was born on 4 June 1959 in Puntarenas, Costa Rica. She earned a bachelor's degree in business administration with an emphasis in accounting from the University of Costa Rica in 1986. She subsequently completed the coursework for a Master of Business Administration at the Universidad Panamericana in 1994 and obtained a master's degree in public management and finance from the International Center for Economic Policy for Development at the National University of Costa Rica in 2010. She has been a member of the Costa Rican Association of Public Accountants since 1986, and is also a certified government auditor through the Global Institute of Auditors in the United States.

Early in her career, Acosta worked in public-sector auditing and internal control and in areas related to government procurement and contracting. She was a professional auditor at the Office of the Comptroller General between June 1983 and October 1998. From November 1998, Acosta served as a national and international consultant and advisor. Between January and September 2004, she worked in Nicaragua as a consultant for KPMG Cárdenas Dosal on a project concerning the efficiency and transparency of government procurement. The project was financed by the Inter-American Development Bank and involved the inspection of government purchasing and contracting processes.

In September 2004, Acosta was appointed Deputy Comptroller General of Costa Rica. She held the position until May 2012, serving under Comptroller Generals Alex Solís Fallas and Rocío Aguilar Montoya. In May 2012, the Legislative Assembly appointed Acosta Comptroller General of the Republic for an eight-year term running from 22 May 2012 to 7 May 2020. She received 38 votes from the 47 legislators present.

In April 2020, the Legislative Assembly re-elected Acosta Comptroller General for another eight-year term. She received 43 votes in the first round of voting, with 13 candidates having been considered during the selection process. Her second term began in May 2020. Acosta's tenure has extended across five presidential administrations: Laura Chinchilla (2010–2014), Luis Guillermo Solís (2014–2018), Carlos Alvarado (2018–2022), Rodrigo Chaves (2022–2026), and Laura Fernández (2026–present). Her current term as Comptroller General runs until May 2028.
