= Hernán Sáenz Jiménez =

Hernán Sáenz Jiménez (born 1944 in San Jose, Costa Rica) is a Costa Rican economist and lawyer, who was the Minister of Finance for the administration of President Rodrigo Carazo Odio in Costa Rica from 1979 to 1981. He served as the Executive Secretary of the Administrative Tribunal of the Inter-American Development Bank in Washington, D.C., from late 1987 until his retirement from the Bank in 2015.

While Sáenz was Minister of Finance, Costa Rica was plagued by economic instability and social unrest. Throughout the Carazo presidency, there was a world economic recession. Oil prices were at historic highs and the value of Costa Rica's main crop, coffee, was falling. Carazo instructed the Central Bank of Costa Rica to borrow heavily in order to maintain the value of the Costa Rican colón, hoping that an economic recovery was close at hand. This policy eventually became unsustainable, leading to a catastrophic sudden devaluation in September 1980. Skyrocketing rates of inflation prompted capital flight, crippling internal business operations. In all, the national debt rose from $800 million to over $3 billion due to the government's mismanagement of the economy. As a result, in 1981 Sáenz was forced to suspend servicing Costa Rica's external debt.

Sáenz asked the International Monetary Fund (IMF) to provide Costa Rica with an emergency loan package to ameliorate the debt crisis. As a precondition for the IMF loan package, Sáenz agreed to sweeping austerity measures demanded by the IMF, including a devaluation of the colón, reduction of public subsidies and spending, removal of price controls, and reform of the tax structure.

Carazo's government ended up not complying with the draconian and one-sided concessions that Sáenz had made to the IMF. Sáenz resigned in protest, hoping other government officials would follow suit, but to no avail. The Costa Rican government simply could not continue under the austerity measures, and the IMF suspended its financial assistance. At the time of Sáenz' resignation, the country was left on the verge of bankruptcy and with a rate of inflation at nearly 100 percent. The heavy load of debt that the central bank acquired during that period has contributed to the high rates of inflation that Costa Rica has endured ever since.

Sáenz subsequently resettled in the United States and took a position as the Executive Secretary of the Administrative Tribunal of the Inter-American Development Bank in Washington, DC, until his retirement in 2015.

== Sources ==
- Nelson, Joan M. Economic Crisis and Policy Choice: The Politics of Adjustment in the Third World. Princeton Univ. Press 1990 at 182-187
- Watkins, Thayer. Political and Economic History of Costa Rica.
