= R. Kenneth Strachan =

Argentina-born American missionary (1910–1965)

- Born: June 1, 1910; Tandil, Buenos Aires Province, Argentina
- Died: February 24, 1965 (aged 54); Pasadena, California, US
- Education: Princeton Theological Seminary (ThM); Wheaton College (BA)
- Occupation: Missionary
- Spouse: Elizabeth Walker Strachan
- Children: 6
- Parents: Henry Strachan (father); Susan Strachan (mother)

R. Kenneth Strachan (June 1, 1910 – February 24, 1965), born Robert Kenneth Strachan, was an Argentine-born American evangelical missionary and director of the Latin America Mission (LAM).

Strachan launched the Evangelism-In-Depth initiative and established an unprecedented network of mission churches in Central and South America, specifically in Costa Rica and Nicaragua. Strachan was well known for his evangelism, spread of Christian education, and desire for missionaries to “latinamericanize".

== Early life ==
Robert Kenneth Strachan was born on June 1, 1910 in Tandil, Argentina to Henry Strachan, a Canadian-born Scottish Minister and missionary, and Susan Strachan, an Irish missionary.

Strachan was the oldest of three kids; a brother to Harry Wallace (born in 1912) and Grace Eileen (born in 1913). Harry and Susan started their missionary work in Argentina from their marriage in 1903 to 1918. Subsequently, they moved to Costa Rica. As children of missionaries, Strachan and his siblings were often left with trusted Christian families in Costa Rica.

Harry and Susan Strachan were leaders of the Latin America Evangelism Campaign. The Strachan family spent many of their early years in Costa Rica. Harry went on many missions trips around the area to evangelize and convert locals into Christianity. Meanwhile, Susan played her own independent role in the campaign by initiating the founding of a girls’ school in Costa Rica and sustaining a small farm to contribute to the mission through food provisions.

At age fifteen, Strachan was sent to the United States and was immediately enrolled into the Wheaton Academy in Illinois to complete his secondary education. Throughout this period, his weekly exchange of letters with his mother portray his difficult transition into American society. In addition, Strachan endured much financial difficulty, as his parents economically supported the ministry more than Strachan's tuition and personal spending funds. Oftentimes, Strachan would not have proper clothing to wear in the wintertime and lack money to provide himself with basic necessities.

== Education and personal life ==
In 1928, Strachan attended Wheaton College. During his undergraduate years, Strachan took a break to go back to Costa Rica, where he experienced tension and crisis while trying to live a life in complete surrender to God and contemplating continuing his parents’ work. After his break, Strachan finished his coursework at Wheaton in 1935. Subsequently, Strachan attended Evangelical Theological College in Dallas, TX; he graduated in 1936. The name of the mission that Strachan's parents were leading, in March 1939, changed its name from the Latin America Evangelism Campaign to the Latin America Mission (LAM).

In August 1942, the growing family moved to New Jersey so that Strachan could attend Princeton Theological Seminary. Strachan obtained a Master of Theology degree from Princeton Seminary in 1943, and immediately returned to LAM in Costa Rica without his family in 1944.

Later in 1994, Strachan's son, Harry Strachan Jr., established the Strachan Foundation to honor his parents and grandparents.

== Missionary work ==
Strachan officially decided to enter LAM in 1936; at this time, his mother served as LAM's Co-Director. Following his brief studies at Princeton Seminary (in 1944), Strachan dedicates LAM as his full-time job. In April 1945, Strachan's father died, which lead to the natural promotion of Strachan as a fellow Co-Director of LAM with Susan.

Throughout the course of his mission work around 1948, Strachan traveled to Colombia, Puerto Rico, Dominican Republic, Panama, Florida, Illinois, California, and New Jersey. Strachan began to gain more clarity in the direction that he wanted LAM to go, and traveled around for recruits, visited seminary graduates, and continued to write love letters to Elizabeth back at home.

Eventually, Strachan's title as Co-Director changed to General Director of LAM, after the passing of his mother.

In 1955, Strachan broadly defined the four main goals of LAM:

1. "to evangelize the continent
2. to build the church
3. to train the leadership
4. to demonstrate the Gospel.”

Strachan was extremely adamant on not only evangelizing, but establishing indigenous churches with national leaders. He strived to create more missionaries and support for the missionaries. Strachan believed that LAM could achieve this goal through latinamericanization—a partnership where Latin Americans and the society would be fully incorporated into LAM and transformed to be a “service agency” of and for the Latin American church.

=== Evangelism-in-Depth (EID) ===
Eager to mobilize every believer, Strachan orchestrated Evangelism-in-Depth (EID). The four main objectives of EID centered around the responsibility Christians carry in fostering congregation and outreach. Moreover, the mission work of EID reflected what was called the “Strachan theorem”, which stated that “the expansion of any movement is in direct proportion to its success in mobilizing its total membership in continuous propagation of its beliefs.” To practice this, Strachan went door-to-door sharing the gospel, mailed invitations to EID meetings, painted banners around town, and dropped handbills from airplanes. Strachan launched EID in Nicaragua (1960) and Guatemala (1962). Ultimately, EID spread to the Caribbean and South America. EID pioneered a new strategy and program for missionaries; the movement underscored the role of the church and drew public attention to Christianity. To the current day, EID serves as a catalyst for other missionary groups in countries like India, Japan, the Philippines, and Africa.

By 1966, LAM fully expanded and was categorized as one of eight missions in the Interdenominational Foreign Mission Association of North America, Inc. and the Evangelical Foreign Missions Association.

== Legacy ==
Due to Strachan's poor health, Strachan concluded his missionary work and settled with his family in Pasadena, California. While living in Pasadena, Strachan lectured at Fuller Theological Seminary. He died from lymphoma in February 1965.

LAM continues to work today. It has expanded its role and now partakes in mobile medical missions, construction projects, offers child care, and food shelter amongst other services. In addition, one of Strachan's son, Harry Wallace Strachan, founded the Strachan Foundation to create education initiatives and provide humanitarian aid in the memory of the Strachan generations before him.

== Personal life ==
Strachan was married to Elizabeth Walker Strachan (née Walker; 1917–1969), a missionary teacher, with whom he had 6 children.

On February 24, 1965 Strachan died aged 54 from Hodgkin lymphoma.in Pasadena, California. He was buried in Costa Rica.
