= Fernando Herrero Acosta =

Costa Rican economist and politician (1952–2023)

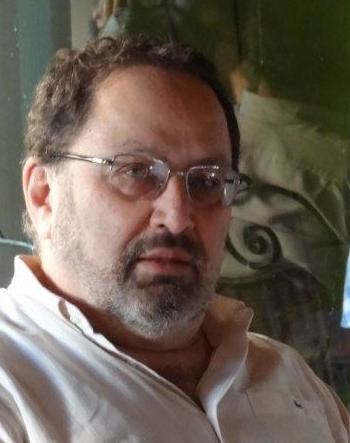
- Herrero in 2015

Minister of Finance
- In office 8 May 2010 – 2 April 2012
- Preceded by: Jenny Phillips Aguilar
- Succeeded by: Edgar Ayales Esna
- In office 8 May 1994 – 13 June 1996
- Preceded by: Rodolfo Méndez Mata
- Succeeded by: Francisco de Paula Gutiérrez

Personal details
- Born: Fernando Antonio Herrero Acosta; 15 December 1952 San José, Costa Rica
- Died: 18 August 2023 (aged 70)
- Party: PLN
- Education: University of Costa Rica; New York University
- Occupation: Economist

Fernando Antonio Herrero Acosta (15 December 1952 – 18 August 2023) was a Costa Rican economist and politician. A member of the National Liberation Party, he served as Minister of Finance from 1994 to 1996 and again from 2010 to 2012.

Herrero died of a stroke on 18 August 2023, at the age of 70.
