= Hospital Clínica Bíblica =

Private Christian hospital in San José, Costa Rica

Geography
- Location: San José, Costa Rica
- Coordinates: 9.927895°N 84.078739°W

Organisation
- Type: General
- Religious affiliation: Christian

History
- Former name: Hospital Clínico Bíblico
- Opened: 1929

Links
- Website: www.clinicabiblica.com
- Lists: Hospitals in Costa Rica

Hospital Clínica Bíblica is a private Christian hospital in San José, Costa Rica. Founded in 1929 as the Hospital Clínico Bíblico by Henry Strachan and Susan Strachan, the Clínica Bíblica Hospital is the largest private hospital in Costa Rica.

== History ==
In 1921, Henry and Susan Strachan founded the ecumenist Latin American Evangelization Campaign (LAEC). In October 1921, the Strachan's set up LAEC, later renamed as the Latin American Mission (LAM), headquarters in San José.

In general, the life expectancy was forty-years old and there were diseases such as tuberculosis and malaria. The San Juan de Dios Hospital was the only one that existed and could only care for part of those ill. The main concern for the Strachan´s was children's health, since they found that, out of each 1000 children born per year, 355 died; 50% before they were five-years-old.

By the year 1968, significant progress in the field of national health had been made. At the same time, there was a good network of hospitals associated with the Costa Rican Social Security, such as the Calderon Guardia Hospital and the Mexico Hospital.

In this new context, the Latin American Mission believed that, on the one hand, their work had already been served and it should leave in order to take their assistance to others. This involved the closing of the Clinica Biblica Hospital, which, so far, had been sustained by foreign aid. It had ample facilities, good medical staff and an excellent technological team. Nevertheless, without financial support, it was impossible to continue working.
