= Juan Tomás de Salas =

Spanish journalist (1938–2000)

Juan Tomás de Salas (1938–2000) was a Spanish journalist. He was born in Valladolid on April 30, 1938, and died in Madrid on 22 August 2000. He was the founder of Cambio 16 and Diario 16. In the 1960s he also worked for the Colombian newspaper El Tiempo.

== Education and exile ==
De Salas studied law in Madrid and obtained a PhD in Economic History at La Sorbonne in Paris. During his youth he also showed enthusiasm for journalism and interest in political activism. He began to engage in anti-Francoist activities, and in 1961 joined the Free Spanish Press Agency, associated with the People's Liberation Front. In 1962, when police arrested nearly a hundred members of the organization, de Salas had to seek political asylum. He managed to take refuge in the embassy of Colombia in Spain, and moved to Bogotá.

In Colombia he started working with the newspaper El Tiempo, and that is where he seriously began to be involved in journalism. In 1966 he moved to France to work at France Press, and in 1969 to London, where he worked for the Spanish version of The Economist. That same year he was allowed to return to Spain when he was acquitted.

== Career ==
He founded in 1971, along with 15 other journalists and media professionals the weekly Cambio 16. Under Francoist Spain, the magazine focused on issues of "Economy and Society", and after Franco's death, became a magazine of general information, which achieved great prominence during the Spanish Transition. The success of the publication led him to found a general newspaper called Diario 16, which was released on 18 October 1976.

During 1980, the good sales of his two publications led him to form a media conglomerate. He created Grupo 16, under which magazines like Motor 16 or Marie Claire were also released.

However, during the 1990 publications went through a serious crisis, led by the poor economic performance of Diario 16. This crisis ended with the sale or even closure of almost all the magazines within his group.

Diario 16 began bankruptcy proceedings in 1997 and Juan Tomás left the group entirely. In 1998 he launched the satirical weekly El gato encerrado, but it failed for lack of funding and De Salas gave up all entrepreneurial activities.

For the rest of his life he continued to publish opinion pieces in various publications. He adopted Colombian dual citizenship, for which he was entitled for his years of work there and as a reminder of the country that welcomed him during his exile.

Juan Tomas de Salas died of cancer on August 22, 2000, at age 62.
