= Public Prosecutor of Costa Rica =

Institution for conducting prosecution in Costa Rica

- Ministerio Público de Costa Rica

Agency overview
- Formed: 1975; 51 years ago
- Agency executive: Carlo Díaz Sánchez, Attorney General
- Website: https://ministeriopublico.poder-judicial.go.cr/

The Public Prosecutor's Office (Spanish: Ministerio Público) of Costa Rica is the authority responsible for the legal prosecution of criminal acts within the state's legal system. It organises the investigation and prosecution of crimes affecting broader society. In investigating crimes, it works jointly with the Judicial Investigation Department.

In some cases, a representative of the Public Prosecutor's Office may have the authority to request that the criminal prosecution be limited to certain offences or persons who participated in the act. It may also request that the case be totally or partially dismissed. The office may also intervene in criminal enforcement proceedings, in the civil defence of the victim when appropriate, and assume the other functions assigned to it by law.

== History ==
Law No. 5377, passed on 19 October 1973, created the current criminal code of Costa Rica. Article 39 of the law called for the establishment of the Public Prosecutor's Office by transferring the prosecutional powers of the Attorney General's Office to the Judiciary. Because the Public Prosecutor's Office of Costa Rica was created by a legislative act, it is therefore not a part of the constitutional organisation of the government. The body that exists today as an auxiliary institution of the current justice department began operation on 1 June 1975.

The current prosecutor general leading the Public Prosecutor's Office is Emilia Navas Aparicio. Her predecessor, Jorge Chavarría Guzmán, held the position from 2010 until 2017 when he was forced to resign due to allegations that he concealed evidence in relation to "el Cementazo", a political scandal.

== List of prosecutor generals ==
- José Chaverri Rodríguez, 1975–1976
- Jorge Rojas Espinoza, 1977–1982
- Fernando Cruz Castro, 1984–1986
- Eduardo Araya Vega, 1986–1989
- José María Tijerino Pacheco, 1990–1995
- Carlos Arias Nuñez, 1996–2003
- Francisco Dall'anese Ruiz, 2003–2010
- Jorge Chavarría Guzmán, 2010–2017
- Emilia Navas Aparicio, 2017–2021

== Organizational structure ==
The Public Ministry is made up of different departments and prosecutors' offices, including:

- Prosecutor General's Office
- Deputy Prosecutor General's Office
- Fiscal Council
- Technical Advisory and International Relations Office
- Fiscal Investigation Department
- Training and Monitoring Department
- Administrative Department
- Property Crime Department
- Drug Trafficking and Juvenile Delinquency Department
- Associate Department of Economic Crimes, Corruption, and Taxes
- Penal Enforcement
- Scam Department
- Vehicle Theft Department
- Department of Domestic Violence and Sex Crimes
- Associate Environmental Department
- Office of Civil Defense of the Victim
- Office of Information and Guidance for the Victim

=== Office of Civil Defense of the Victim ===
The Office of Civil Defense of the Victim was established on 1 January 1998, as part of a legislative change to the criminal code. The office provides the victims of a crime with a legal representative to help them obtain compensation for the damages they have suffered. Any member of the public may have a lawyer assigned to them, free of charge, who takes the necessary steps to ensure that the accused or responsible party pays for the damages caused. If the office verifies that the victim did have sufficient resources to hire a private legal representative to handle the case, it will make the necessary arrangements for the victim to pay for the professional services rendered.

== See also ==
- Supreme Court of Costa Rica
- Judicial Investigation Department
