= Cambio (magazine) =

- Cover of Cambio, issue 807 December 2008.
- Categories: News magazine
- Frequency: Monthly
- Founder: Patricia Lara Salive; Daniel Samper Pizano
- First issue: 14 June 1993
- Final issue: 3 February 2010
- Company: Casa Editorial El Tiempo
- Country: Colombia
- Based in: Bogotá, D.C.
- Language: Spanish
- Website: cambiocolombia.com
- ISSN: 0124-4957
- OCLC: 41936854

Cambio (Spanish: Change) is a Colombian-based social, political and economics magazine. Founded with the name Cambio 16 it was later sold and Cambio in 1998 to Nobel laureate Gabriel García Márquez and other associates. In 2006 the magazine was sold to "Casa Editorial El Tiempo", the owner of Colombia's El Tiempo newspaper. The magazine ceased publication in February 2010.

Cambio returned to publication in 2022 in a digital-only format; people who have collaborated with it include Carolina Sanín.

== History ==
Cambio was founded as Cambio 16 América by Colombian journalist Daniel Samper Pizano and Spanish associates called the "sociedad empresarial española "Grupo 16"" who owned the Cambio 16 version of this magazine in Spain and were trying to establish a second major weekly magazine in Colombia to compete with Semana.

Cambio 16 Américas was released on June 14, 1993, under the direction of Darío Restrepo Vélez and Patricia Lara Salive as chief executive officer of the board of directors. Samper worked as an editor. The owner and general director was the Spanish Juan Tomás de Salas.

The first editorial committee was headed by Daniel Samper Pizano, Consuelo Mendoza, Guillermo Cortés, Gabriel Jaramillo, Gloria Zea, Reinaldo Cabrera and Patricia Lara Salive. It had a number of contributors like Antonio Caballero, Alberto Donadío, Germán Espinosa, Eduardo Escobar, Alfredo Molano Bravo, Darío Jaramillo Agudelo and Juan Ballesta.

It later went through many image and directive renovations when Patricia Lara Salive became an associate in 1996; Rafael de Nicolás, Fabio Echeverri Correa and Dionisio Ibáñez were appointed to the board of directors. The editorial team was replaced by Guillermo Ángulo, Reinaldo Cabrera, Hernando Gómez Buendía, Gabriel Jaramillo, Consuelo Mendoza, among others and the general direction of Carlos Lemoine Amaya.

Cambio was then sold to the society Abrenuncio S.A. from Bogotá on November 25, 1998. The society was conformed by Nobel laureate Gabriel García Márquez, his wife Mercedes Barcha, Maria Elvira Samper, Roberto Pombo, Mauricio Vargas Linares, among others. In 2006 the magazine was sold to Casa Editorial el Tiempo.
