= Contraloría General de la República de Costa Rica =

State Comptroller of Costa Rica

Office of the Comptroller General of the Republic
- Contraloría General de la República

Agency overview
- Formed: 7 November 1949; 76 years ago
- Headquarters: Mata Redonda, San José
- Agency executives: Marta Acosta Zúñiga, Comptroller General; Bernal Aragón Barquero, Deputy Comptroller General
- Website: www.cgr.go.cr

The Office of the Comptroller General of the Republic (Spanish: Contraloría General de la República, CGR) is the constitutional organ of Costa Rica responsible for overseeing the use of public funds and exercising control over the Public Treasury. It is also the governing body of the country's public auditing system.

The Comptroller General's Office is an auxiliary institution of the Legislative Assembly in the oversight of public finances, but has functional and administrative independence from the branches of government and other public entities in carrying out its duties. As comptroller of the State, its actions are subject to the Constitution, international treaties and agreements, and national law.

== History ==
The Office of the Comptroller General of the Republic was established by the Constitution of Costa Rica, which entered into force in November 1949. The institution was created as an auxiliary body of the Legislative Assembly to oversee the execution and settlement of the national budget and to exercise control over the use of public funds.

The office received its statutory framework with the enactment of Law No. 1252 on 23 December 1950. It began operations in 1951 under Comptroller General Amadeo Quirós Blanco and Deputy Comptroller Rodolfo Castaing Castro.

Its headquarters are located in San José, facing La Sabana Metropolitan Park, the city's largest urban park.

== Organization and powers ==
The institution is headed by a Comptroller General and a Deputy Comptroller General. Both officials are appointed by the Legislative Assembly for eight-year terms. Their appointments take effect two years after the beginning of a presidential term. They may be re-elected and enjoy the immunities and privileges established for members of the branches of government.

The Comptroller General and Deputy Comptroller General are accountable to the Legislative Assembly for the performance of their duties. The Assembly may remove either official by a vote of at least two-thirds of its total membership if, following the legally established proceedings, the official is found to have acted incompetently or improperly. Since the institution's establishment, this power has been exercised once, in the case of Alex Solís Fallas.

The Comptroller General's Office exercises oversight over entities and bodies forming part of the Public Treasury. Within its legal sphere of competence, criteria issued by the Comptroller General are binding on entities and persons subject to its control or oversight. The office may also exercise oversight over non-state public entities, private entities that hold or administer public funds, and foreign entities and organizations formed by Costa Rican public entities whose assets or financial resources consist primarily of Costa Rican public funds, even when they were established under foreign law and are domiciled outside Costa Rica.

In judicial proceedings, the Comptroller General's Office may participate as amicus curiae in cases involving the Public Treasury or private funds subject to its oversight. It may also participate as a principal party in proceedings concerning acts or opinions of the Comptroller General, as well as acts of the executive administration that were ordered or recommended by the Comptroller General.
