= Ministry of Finance (Costa Rica) =

Government ministry of Costa Rica

Ministry of Finance of Costa Rica
- Ministerio de Hacienda

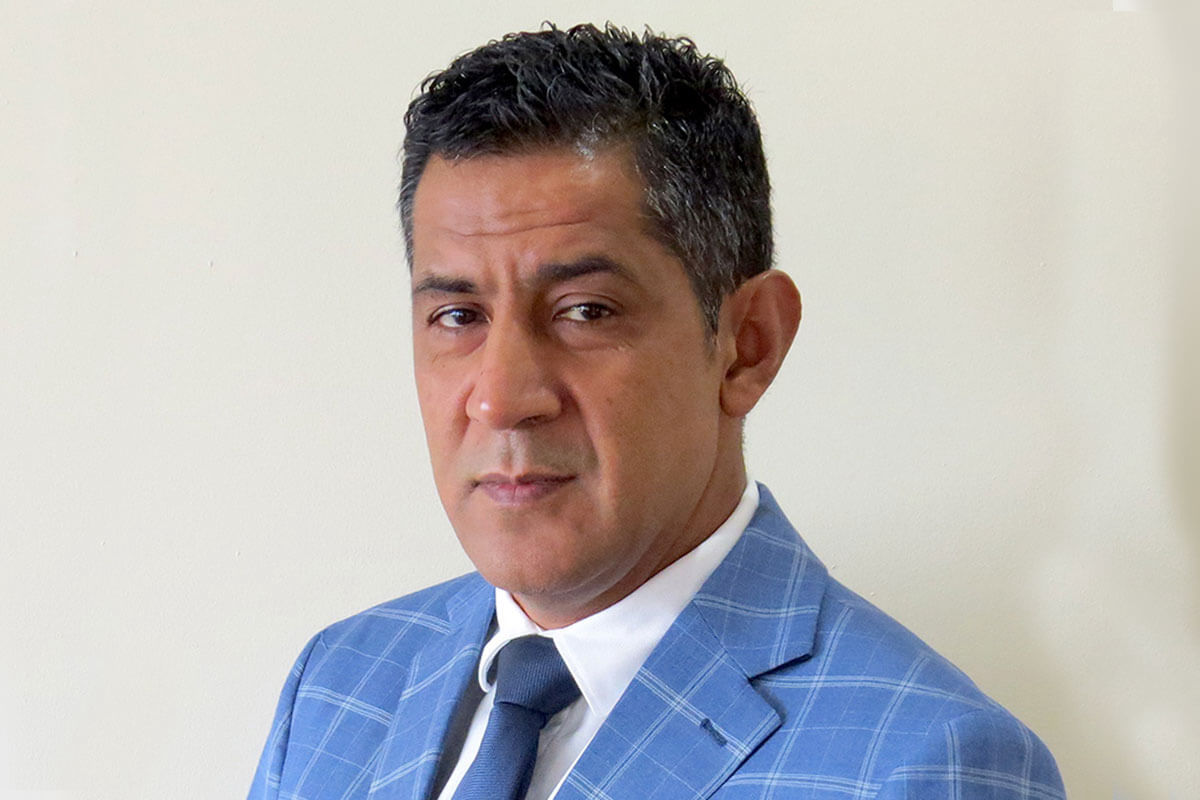
- Nogui Acosta Jaen, current minister

Agency overview
- Formed: 14 October 1825
- Jurisdiction: Government of Costa Rica
- Headquarters: Avenida 2, Calle 3. 10104, Catedral District, San José
- Agency executive: Nogui Acosta Jaen, Minister
- Website: Official website

The Ministry of Finance of (Spanish: Ministerio de Hacienda) Costa Rica is the government ministry of Costa Rica in charge of governing the fiscal policy on public resources, according to the principles of economy, efficiency and effectiveness.

== History ==
An office of the Ministry of Finance

The agency was established on 14 October 1825 by executive decree LV. The name of the ministry was changed as Ministry of Economy and Finance as a result of new objectives and functions. New reorganization took effect in 1966 and caused the ministry to be renamed as Ministry of Finance.

== Ministers ==
- Joaquín Bernardo Calvo Rosales, ?-1844-?
- Manuel José Carazo Bonilla, ?-1855-?
- Rafael García-Escalante Nava, ?-1857-?
- Salvador González Ramírez, ?-1872-?
- Mauro Fernández Acuña, 1885–?
- Rafael Yglesias Castro, 1893–1894
- Felipe J. Alvarado, ?-1914-?
- Mariano Guardia Carazo, ?-1914-1916-?
- Manuel Francisco Jiménez Delgado, ?-1918-?
- Enrique Ortiz Rivera, ?-1918-?
- Aguilar Bolandi, ?-1919
- Carlos Brenes Ortiz, 1919
- Enrique Ortiz Rivera, 1919
- Franklin Jiménez Delgado, 1919–?
- Rafael Huete Sáenz, 1920–1921
- Nicolás Chavarría Mora, 1921–?
- Tomás Soley Güell, 1923–1928
- Juan Rafael Arias Bonilla, ?-1929-1930
- Tomás Soley Güell, 1930
- Luis Demetrio Tinoco Castro
- Everardo Gómez Rojas, ?-1939-?
- Alvaro Bonilla Lara, ?-1945-?
- Alfredo Hernández Volio, 1949–1953
- Jorge Rossi Chavarría, 1953–1956
- ?, 1956–1957
- Raúl Hess Estrada, 1957–1958
- Alfredo Hernández Volio, 1958–1959
- Jorge Borbón Castro, 1959–1962
- Raúl Hess Estrada, 1962–1963
- Bernal Jiménez Monge, 1963–1966
- Álvaro Hernández Piedra, 1966–1969
- Óscar Barahona Streber, 1969–1972
- Claudio Alpizar Vargas, 1972–1974
- Porfirio Morera Batres, 1974–1977
- Federico Vargas Peralta, 1977–1978
- Hernán Sáenz Jiménez, 1978–1981
- Carlos Muñoz Vega, 1981
- Emilio Garnier Borella, 1981–1982
- Federico Vargas Peralta, 1982–1984
- Porfirio Morera Batres, 1984–1986
- Fernando Naranjo Villalobos, 1986–1989
- Rodrigo Bolaños Zamora, 1989–1990
- Thelmo Vargas Madrigal, 1990–1992
- Rodolfo Méndez Mata, 1992–1994
- José Rafael Brenes Vega, 1994
- Fernando Herrero Acosta, 1994–1996
- Francisco de Paula Gutiérrez Gutiérrez, 1996–1998
- Leonel Baruch, 1998–2001
- Alberto Dent Zeledón, 2001–2002
- Jorge Bolaños Rojas, 2002–2003
- Alberto Dent Zeledón, 2003–2004
- Federico Carrillo Zürcher, 2004–2005
- David Fuentes Montero, 2005–2006
- Guillermo Zúñiga Chaves, 2006–2009
- Jenny Philips Aguilar, 2009–2010
- Fernando Herrero Acosta, 2010–2012
- Luis Liberman, acting, 2012
- Edgar Ayales Esna, 2012–2014
- Helio Fallas Venegas, 2014–2018
- Rocío Aguilar Montoya, 2018–2019
- Rodrigo Chaves Robles, 2019–2020
- Elián Villegas Valverde, 2020–2022
- Nogui Acosta Jaen, 2022–current

== See also ==
- Central Bank of Costa Rica
