= Judicial Investigation Department =

Costa Rican government department

- Organismo de Investigación Judicial

Agency overview
- Formed: 1973; 52 years ago
- Jurisdiction: Government of Costa Rica
- Parent department: Supreme Court of Justice of Costa Rica
- Child agency: Department of Criminal Investigations (Departamento de Investigaciones Criminales)
- Website: www.poder-judicial.go.cr/oij/oijinternet.htm

The Judicial Investigation Department (Spanish: Organismo de Investigación Judicial, OIJ) of Costa Rica is a dependency of the Supreme Court of Justice which works in collaboration with the Public Prosecutor of Costa Rica. The department was founded in 1973. Since October 2015, its director has been Walter Espinoza Espinoza.

The department is a subsidiary body of the Public Prosecutor of Costa Rica which conducts the agency's criminal investigations in order to guarantee the impartiality, honesty and objectivity of its investigations. The Organic Law of Costa stipulates that the OIJ should act independently and on their own initiative. It is given the authority to identity criminal offenders and to perform the preventive apprehension of alleged offenders. The department also collects, secures, and manages the evidence and other background information necessary for the investigation.

== Organisational structure ==
The administration of the department is overseen by the General Directorate and the General Secretariat. The General Directorate manages the entire organisation and coordinates interdepartmental activities. The General Secretariat oversees the organisation's budget and the allocation of resources and people to its respective departments. The organisations internal departments include the Department of Criminal Investigations and the Department of Forensics.

=== Criminal Investigations Department ===
The Criminal Investigation Department is responsible for searching for and collecting the necessary evidence to construct a criminal case. The department also oversees the Museum of Criminology, which is located in the building of the OIJ in the First Judicial Circuit of San Jose. It is composed of the following divisions:

- Crimes
- Frauds
- Economic and Financial Crimes
- Narcotics
- Homicides
- Property crime
- Thefts
- Assaults and vehicles theft support division
- Juvenile delinquency division
- Transit specialists
- Various crimes and kidnappings division
- Sexual Crimes
- Family and Against Life
- Complaint reception
- Incarceration and transportations
- Police Service Immediate Intervention (SPII)
- Plans and Operations
- Research Background Screeners
- Armory

=== Department of Forensics ===
The Forensics department is located Forensic Complex in San Joaquín de Flores. Its primary function is to carry out the autopsies and other scientific examinations. The Forensic Science Laboratory technically analyzes each of the evidence gathered during investigations, conducting counterfeiting detection, forensic biology, biochemistry, ballistics, analytical chemistry, toxicology, navigational transit, planimetry, and the analysis of photo and video evidence.

The Department of Forensics is composed of several different divisions specializing in:

- Medical jurisprudence
- Forensic pathology
- Psychiatry and psychology
- Occupational medicine
- Evidence storage
- Canine Unit

== Criticism ==
The OIJ has been criticized for its illegal surveillance of Diario Extra journalist Manuel Estrada, who had written an article critical of the OIJ. In a victory for press freedom and citizen journalists, Judge Ernesto Jinesta Lobo of the Constitutional Chamber of the Supreme Court condemned the OIJ for conducting illegal wiretaps to identify the sources used by Estrada for his article. In addition to bona-fide journalists, Judge Lobo ruled that citizen journalists (those who “regularly contribute” to reporting or public opinion) also have the right to be shielded from prosecutorial abuses of surveillance. Further criticism of the department has stemmed from its practice of automatic dismissal of investigations related to intellectual property crimes up until 2011.

== See also ==
- Supreme Court of Justice of Costa Rica
- Public Prosecutor of Costa Rica
