= Free State of Costa Rica =

1838–1847 state in Central America

Free State of Costa Rica Estado Libre de Costa Rica
- 1838–1847
- Flag Coat of arms

- Capital: San José
- Common languages: Spanish
- Government: Republic
- Head of State
  - 1838–1842: Braulio Carrillo Colina
  - 1842: Francisco Morazán
  - 1842: Antonio Pinto Soares
  - 1842–1844: José María Alfaro Zamora
  - 1846: Francisco María Oreamuno Bonilla
  - 1846-1847: José María Alfaro Zamora
- Legislature: House of Senators and House of Deputies
- History
  - Independence from Federal Republic of Central America: November 14, 1838
  - Republic proclamation: August 31, 1847
- Currency: Costa Rican real
Preceded by	Succeeded by
Federal Republic of Central America	First Costa Rican Republic

The Free State of Costa Rica was the name acquired by Costa Rica after its split from the Federal Republic of Central America in 1838 and until the proclamation of the First Costa Rican Republic in 1847.

== Background ==
Costa Rica, as a member state of the Central American Federation, was officially named the State of Costa Rica as established on the Fundamental Law of the State of Costa Rica. As a federal state, Costa Rica was an active member of the Federation respecting the federal laws and electing its representatives to the Federal level. However, with the start of the civil war among Guatemala, Honduras, and El Salvador, Costa Rica enacted the Aprilia Law, allowing itself to remain autonomous until constitutional order was restored.

After Francisco Morazán’s victory in the civil war and despite still having the Aprilia Law in function, Costa Rica held an election for its seats on the Federal Congress, electing Félix Romero Menjíbar and Juan Diego Bonilla Nava as deputies and Marquis Manuel María de Peralta and José Francisco Peralta as senators. Bonilla even acted as President of the Federal Congress. Morazán was elected President in the 1830 Central American federal election, and the Central American Supreme Court requested Costa Rica to abrogate the Aprilia Law, which Costa Rica's state congress did on February 3, 1831.

However, after Colombia's annexation of the Costa Rican territory of Bocas del Toro (modern day Panama), without receiving federal help, sympathy for the Federation decreased. Finally, on May 30, 1838, the Federal Congress allowed the dissolution of the Federal Republic by letting each of the member states to be “organized according to their will”, which essentially ended the Federation.

== History ==
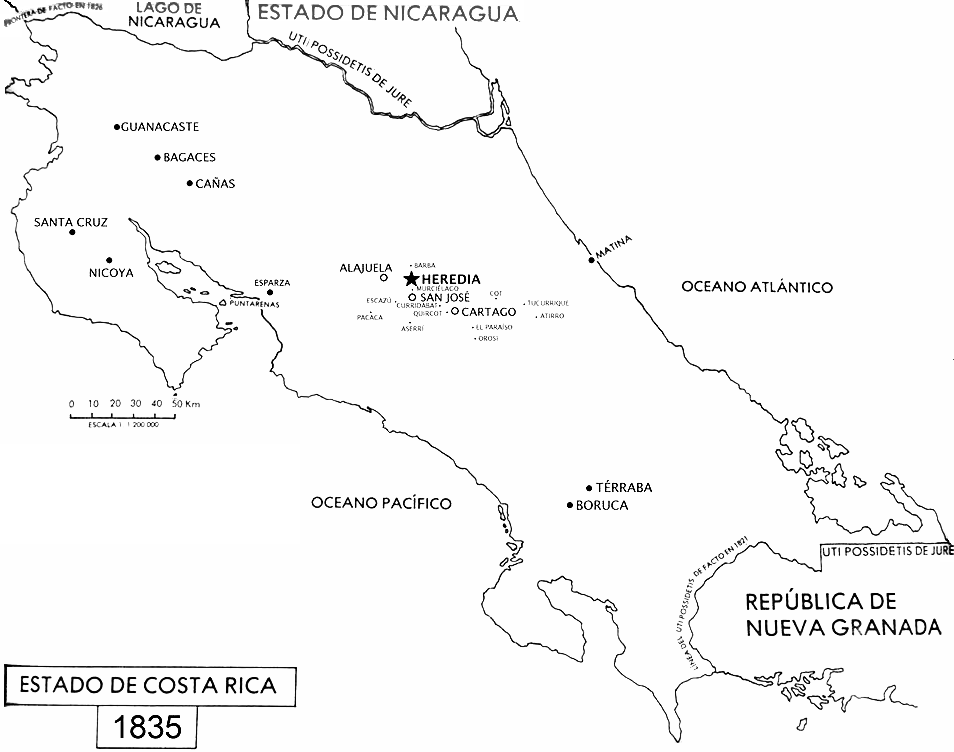
The State of Costa Rica in 1835 still inside the Federal Republic and with Heredia as capital.

Costa Rica's independence from the Federal Republic was proclaimed by then dictator Braulio Carrillo, and his Decree of Basis and Guarantees became the de facto Constitution. Carrillo negotiated the debt payment with Great Britain (acquired collectively as part of the Federation) to avoid the impending threat of invasion, encouraged the coffee-growing industry, and connected Limón Province through a railroad. However, Carrillo was overthrown by Francisco Morazán who proclaimed himself the new president. Morazán was planning to re-establish the Federation by force using Costa Rica as headquarters, and thus, was overthrown and executed to avoid the war that the rest of Central America was already planning against Costa Rica. The leader of the coup, Antonio Pinto Soares, took power temporarily, but he was born in Portugal and thus couldn't be Head of State. Congress chose José María Alfaro Zamora in his place, who ruled between September 27, 1842 and November 28, 1844. Alfaro called for elections for a new Constituent Assembly, which enacted the 1844 Constitution.

Francisco María Oreamuno Bonilla was elected Head of State in the 1844 Costa Rican Head of State election but never took interest in the office and was deposed, replaced by President of the Senate Rafael Moya Murillo from December 17, 1844 till April 30, 1845, and then by Senator José Rafael Gallegos between May 1, 1845 and June 7, 1846.

Gallegos' government was highly unpopular due to his attempts to rule by decree and the chaotic situation. A coup deposed him, led by Zamora, who then called for a new Constituent Assembly and created the 1847 Constitution. The name of the country was changed back to State of Costa Rica, the presidential period was extended to six years, male universal suffrage was established, the bicameral congress was changed to unicameral, and the office of the President of the State was created. In the following 1847 Costa Rican Head of State election, José María Castro Madriz won over Zamora and his reformation of the 1847 Constitution proclaimed the Republic of Costa Rica, ending the existence of the Free State.

== Government ==
The Executive branch of government was in the hands of the Head of State, who was also head of government and elected by popular vote. The Legislature was bicameral for most of its history with a Senate and a House of Deputies, both elected by popular vote. The Judiciary was named Supreme Court of Justice of Costa Rica and all branches were independent from each other.

== Religion ==
Unlike previous constitutions, which had established not only the official status of the Catholic faith as that of the state, but also the mandatory practice of Catholicism within Costa Rican territory (except for foreigners who were merely passing through), the Constitution of 1844 enshrined freedom of religion while maintaining the official status of the Catholic religion as that of the state and one that the state had the duty to finance. The Decree of Bases and Guarantees that preceded this Constitution and served as the de facto constitution during the dictatorship of Carrillo omitted the religious issue entirely. In any case, during this period the majority of the population was Catholic, and only indigenous peoples in isolated mountainous areas and Sephardic Jews broke the religious homogeneity.
