= 1835 Costa Rican Head of State election =

- 1–9 April 1835
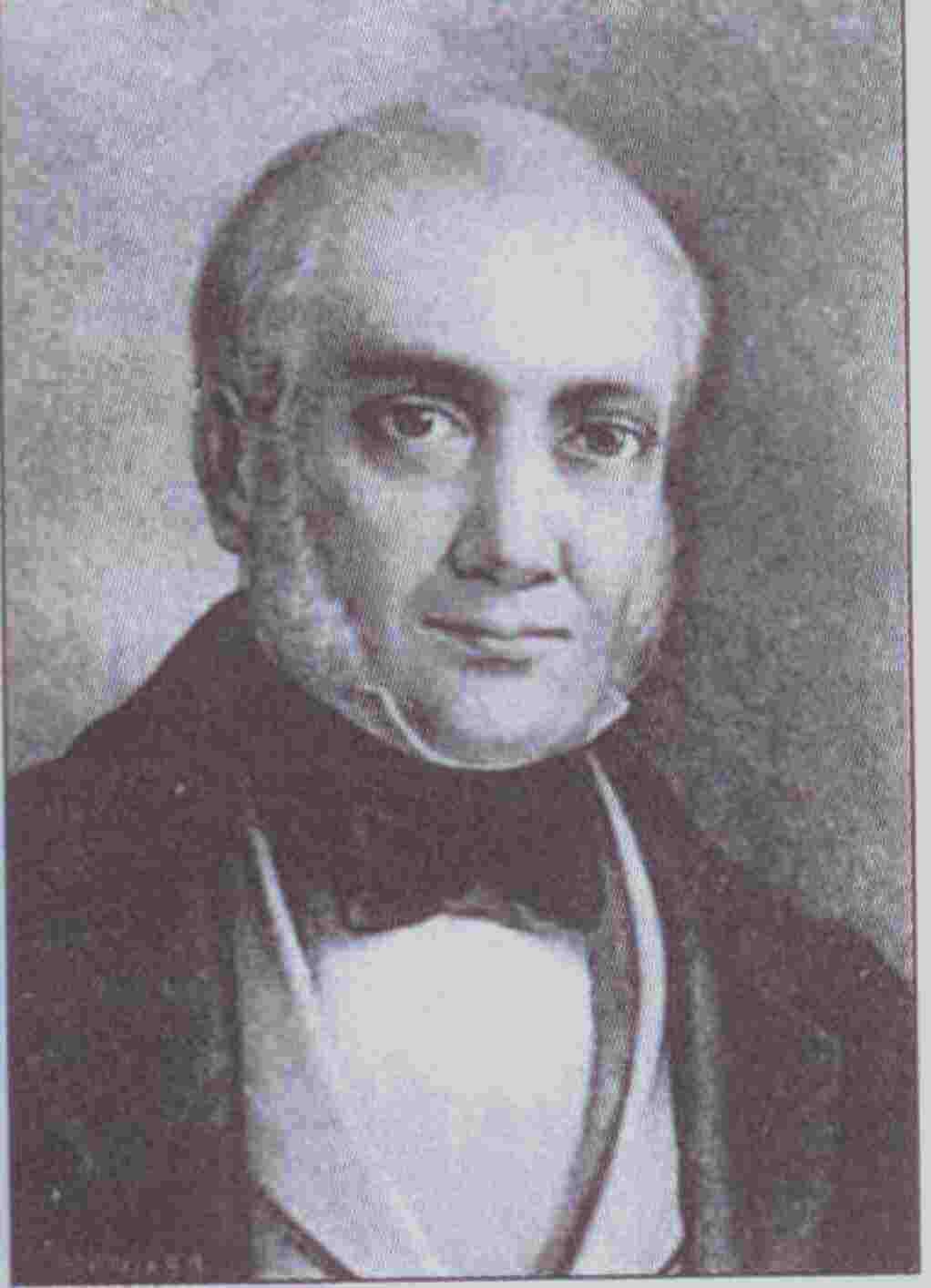

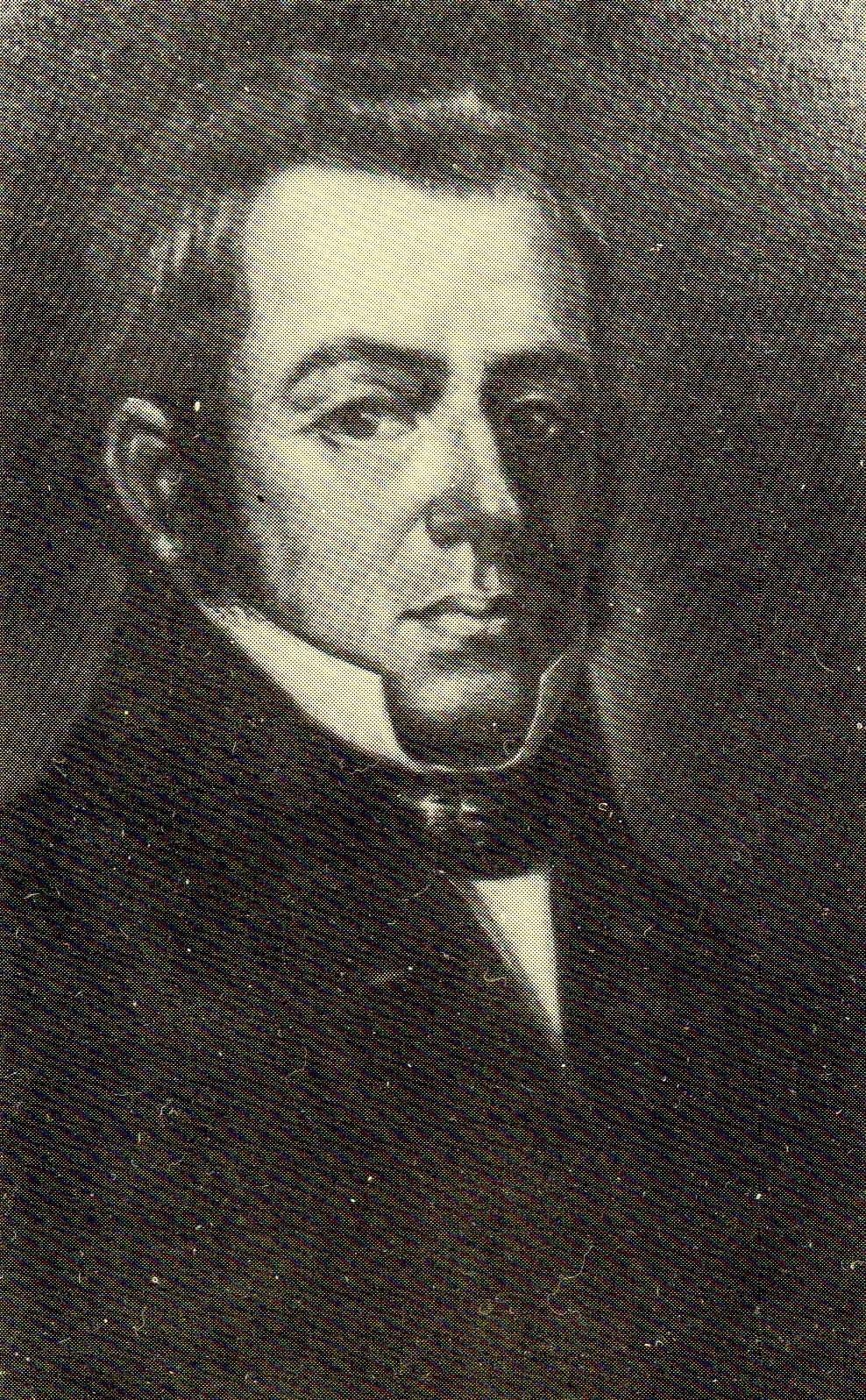

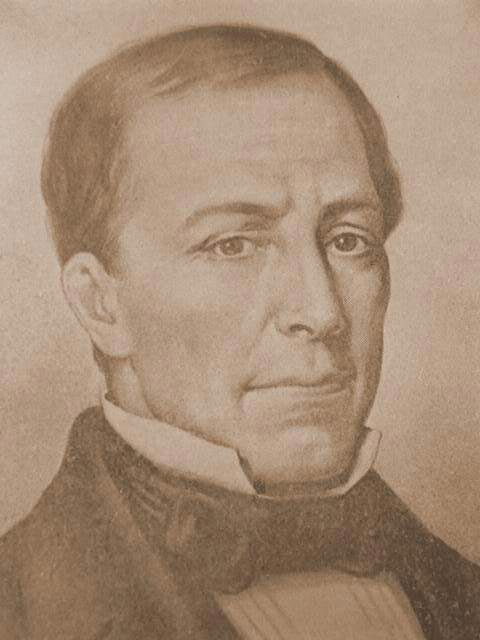
Nominee	Braulio Carrillo Colina	Juan José Lara	Manuel Aguilar Chacón
Party	Independent	Independent	Independent
Electoral vote	16	11	6
Percentage	42.11%	28.95%	15.79%
Head of State before election
Manuel Fernández Chacón (acting)
Independent
Elected Head of State
Braulio Carrillo Colina
Independent

Head of State elections were held in Costa Rica between 1 and 9 April 1835 to choose a successor to complete the 1833–1837 constitutional term following the resignation of José Rafael Gallegos. Gallegos resigned on 4 March 1835 after having unsuccessfully sought to leave office the previous year. During the ensuing constitutional crisis, several officials briefly exercised or declined executive authority before a new election was held.

After accepting Gallegos's resignation, the Congress declared his 1833 election null and void, citing constitutional irregularities in his original appointment. It then invited Manuel Aguilar Chacón, who had received the largest number of electoral votes in the 1833 election, to assume the office, but he declined. Congress next called upon Nicolás Ulloa Soto, who also refused. Executive authority then passed temporarily to Vice Head of State Manuel Fernández Chacón, while deputy Juan José Lara Arias, appointed by Congress, had briefly exercised executive power between 4 and 17 March.

The election produced no absolute majority in the electoral college. Former federal deputy Braulio Carrillo Colina received 42.1% of the electoral vote, followed by Juan José Lara Arias with 29.0% and Manuel Aguilar Chacón with 15.8%. Under a recent amendment to Article 38 of the Fundamental Law of the State of Costa Rica, however, only candidates who had obtained at least 12 electoral votes could be considered by Congress if no candidate secured an absolute majority. As Carrillo was the only candidate to meet that threshold, Congress declared him elected and inaugurated him as Head of State. It also determined that his term would expire on 28 February 1837, completing just under the remainder of the original constitutional period.

== Electoral system ==
At that time the Constitution established a system in which male Costa Ricans voted publicly to elect their electoral delegates who, in proportion to the population of the area they represented, then elected the Head of State. San Jose chose 11, Cartago 8, Heredia 8, Alajuela 5, Bagaces 1, Escazú 3, Ujarrás 2, Térraba 1 and Nicoya 3.

== Results ==
Candidate	Votes	%
Braulio Carrillo Colina	16	42.11
Juan José Lara	11	28.95
Manuel Aguilar Chacón	6	15.79
Joaquín de Iglesias Vidamartel	3	7.89
Manuel Fernández Chacón	1	2.63
Agustín Gutiérrez y Lizaurzábal	1	2.63
Total	38	100.00
Source: TSE
