= 1837 Costa Rican Head of State election =

- 5 February–9 April 1837
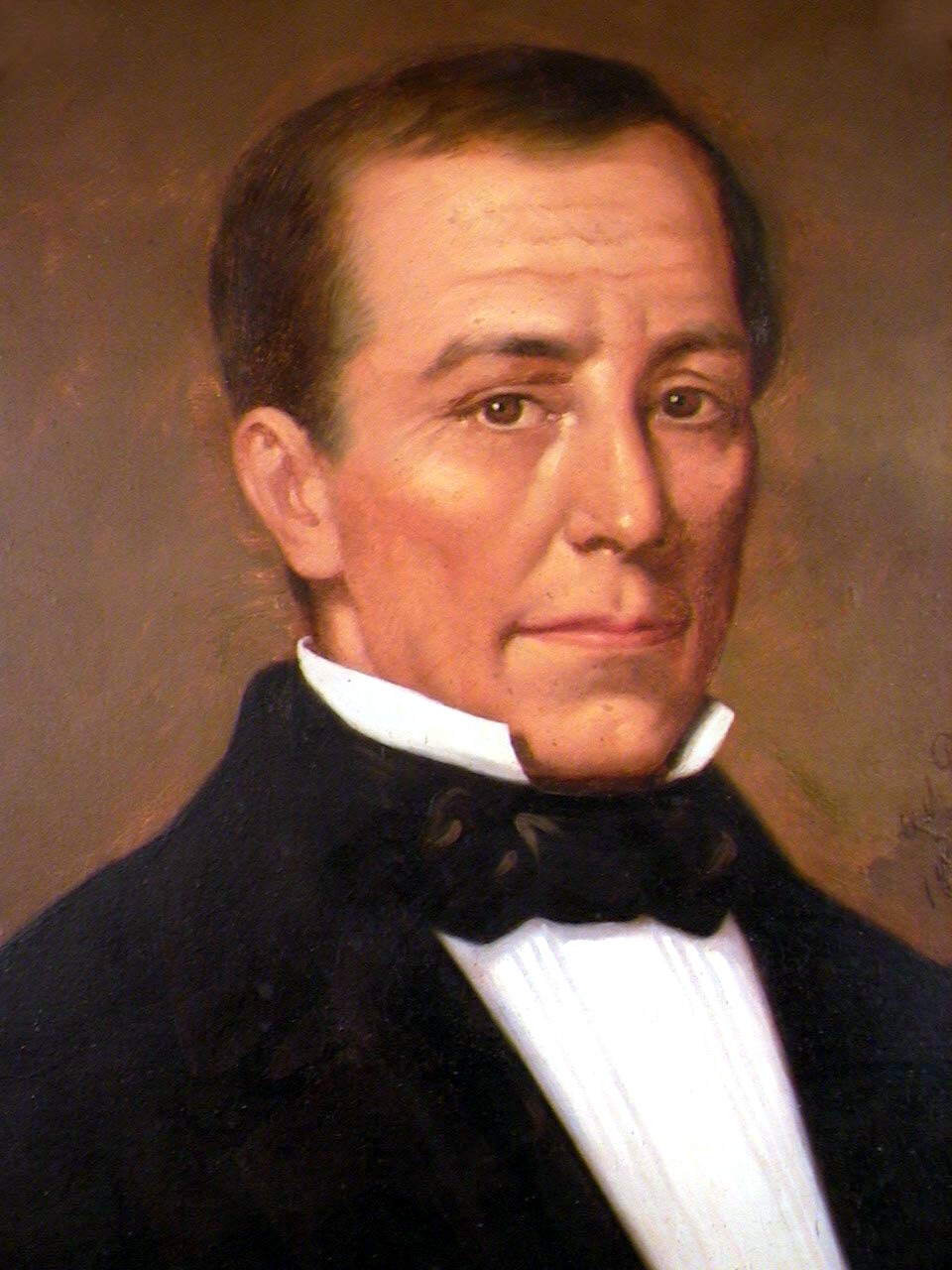

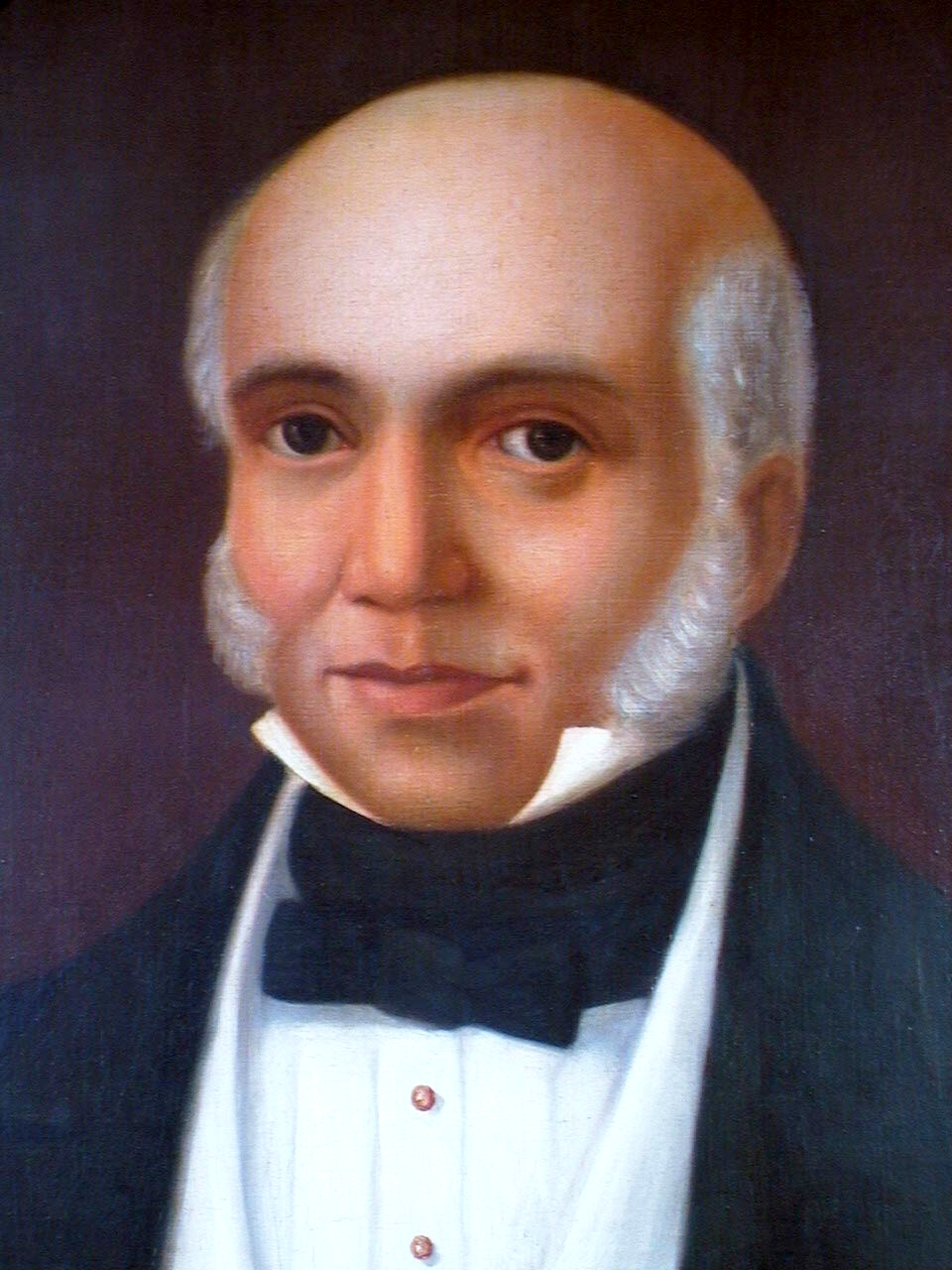
Nominee	Manuel Aguilar Chacón	Braulio Carrillo Colina
Party	Independent	Independent
Electoral vote	22	17
Percentage	53.66%	41.46%
Head of State before election
Joaquín Mora Fernández (acting)
Independent
Elected Head of State
Manuel Aguilar Chacón
Independent

Head of State elections were held in Costa Rica in 1837. Manuel Aguilar Chacón was elected over Braulio Carrillo Colina using the model of indirect suffrage prescribed by the Fundamental Law of the State of Costa Rica. General election among all citizens authorized to vote was held, using public vote, electing a group of electors proportional to the population of the province they represented who then elected the president directly.

However, Aguilar would not end his term when he resigned for health reasons. Carrillo became a dictator until the invasion of Francisco Morazán and his resignation as part of the agreements of the Jocote Pact.

== Results ==
Candidate	Votes	%
Manuel Aguilar Chacón	22	53.66
Braulio Carrillo Colina	17	41.46
Toribio Argüello	2	4.88
Total	41	100.00
Source: TSE
