= List of heads of state of Costa Rica =

The following is the list of all the heads of state of Costa Rica. The current Constitution establishes that the President of Costa Rica is both head of state and head of government, and the current officeholder is Laura Fernández Delgado of the PPSO.

== First independent governments (1821–1824) ==
On October 11, 1821, the province of Costa Rica proclaimed its absolute independence from Spain. On the 29th of that month, the city of Cartago, head of the Partido de Costa Rican, also signed an act declaring the absolute independence of the Spanish Government.

During this period the main divisions occurred between two sides; the imperialist who sought to annex Costa Rica to the First Mexican Empire and the Republican who sought full independence from Costa Rica. The monarchicals or monarchists also advocated the recognition of Agustín de Iturbide as emperor.

Political chief of the Province of Costa Rica	Office	Term	Faction
Republicans Imperialists
Juan Manuel de Cañas	Political chief	October 11, 1821 – November 12, 1821	Españolista
Nicolás Carrillo y Aguirre	President of the Town's Legates Junta	November 12, 1821 – December 1, 1821	Imperialist
Pedro José de Alvarado y Baeza	President of the Provisional Government Junta	December 1821– January 1822	Imperialist
Rafael Barroeta y Castilla	President of the Electors Board	January 6–13, 1822; president of the Superior Government Junta, January 6 – April 13, 1822	Imperialist
Santiago de Bonilla y Laya-Bolívar	President of the Superior Government Junta	13 April – June 15, 1822	Liberal
José María de Peralta	President of the Superior Government Junta	June 15 – October 17, 1822	Republican
José Rafael Gallegos	President of the Superior Government Junta	17 octubre de 1822– January 1, 1823	Imperialist
José Santos Lombardo	President of the Superior Government Junta	January 1 – March 20, 1823	Imperialist
Rafael Francisco Osejo	President of the Diputación of Costa Rica	March 20–29, 1823	Republican
Joaquín de Oreamuno	General Commander of Arms, de facto	March 29 – April 5, 1823	Imperialist
Gregorio José Ramírez	General Commander of Arms, de facto	April 5 – 16, 1823	Republican
José María de Peralta	President of the Constituent Provincial Congress	April 16 – May 10, 1823	Republican
Manuel Alvarado e Hidalgo	President of the Superior Government Junta	1823–1824	Republican
Eusebio Rodríguez y Castro	President of the Superior Government Junta	January 8 – February 12, 1824	Republican
Manuel Alvarado e Hidalgo	President of the Superior Government Junta	February 12 – September 8, 1824	Republican

== Emperor (1822–1823) ==
Emperor	Term	Notes
Agustín de Iturbide	May 19, 1822– March 19, 1823	During the period of permanence of Costa Rica in the First Mexican Empire, Emperor Agustín de Iturbide was the monarch of the country as of the rest of the Empire. However, imperial sovereignty was not universally recognized. The disputes between imperialists loyal to Iturbide and Republicans seeking full independence led to the first Costa Rican Civil War.

== President of the Federal Republic of Central America (1823–1839) ==
Between 1824 and 1838 Costa Rica was a member of the Federal Republic of Central America, and the president was the federal president of the country, although the political influence of the federal government was minimal.

President	Term (Election)	Profession	Party
Liberal Party Conservative Party
José Matías Delgado	1823 (interim)	Catholic Priest	Liberal Party
First Triumvirate: Pedro Molina Mazariegos; Manuel José Arce; Juan Vicente Villacorta Díaz	(1823)		Liberal Party
Second Triumvirate: Manuel José Arce; José Cecilio del Valle; Tomás Antonio O'Horán y Argüello	1823–1825		Liberal Party
Manuel José Arce	29 April 1825-13 April 1829 (Appointed by Congress)	Military	Liberal Party
Mariano Beltranena y Llano	13 April 1829-14 June 1829 (Deposed)	Aristocrat	Conservative Party
José Francisco Barrundia	26 June 1829-16 June 1830 (interim)	Journalist	Liberal Party
Francisco Morazán	16 September 1830-16 September 1834 (1830)	Military	Liberal Party
José Cecilio del Valle†	(1834. Died before assuming office)	Military	Conservative Party
José Gregorio Salazar	16 September 1834-14 February 1835 (interim)	Politician	Liberal Party
Francisco Morazán	February 14, 1835 – February 1, 1839 (1835, Costa Rica splits from the Federation).	Military	Liberal Party

== Heads of State of Costa Rica (1824–1847) ==
Between 1824 and 1847 and according to the Constitutions of the United Provinces of Central America (1824), of Costa Rica from 1825 and 1844, the chief of the executive branch bore the title of supreme chief or first chief.

Liberals almost completely dominated Costa Rican politics during this period, to the point that many historians call this the "Liberal State". In Costa Rica there was no war between liberals and conservatives as was common in the rest of Latin America and even coup d'etats and de facto governments were mostly between liberal factions. The only conservative president of this period was José Rafael de Gallegos y Alvarado who did not end his term. Another conservative, Nicolás Ulloa Soto, never took office.

Head of State of the Free State of Costa Rica
- Jefe de Estado del Estado Libre de Costa Rica
- Coat of arms of the Free State of Costa Rica

- Flag of the Free State of Costa Rica

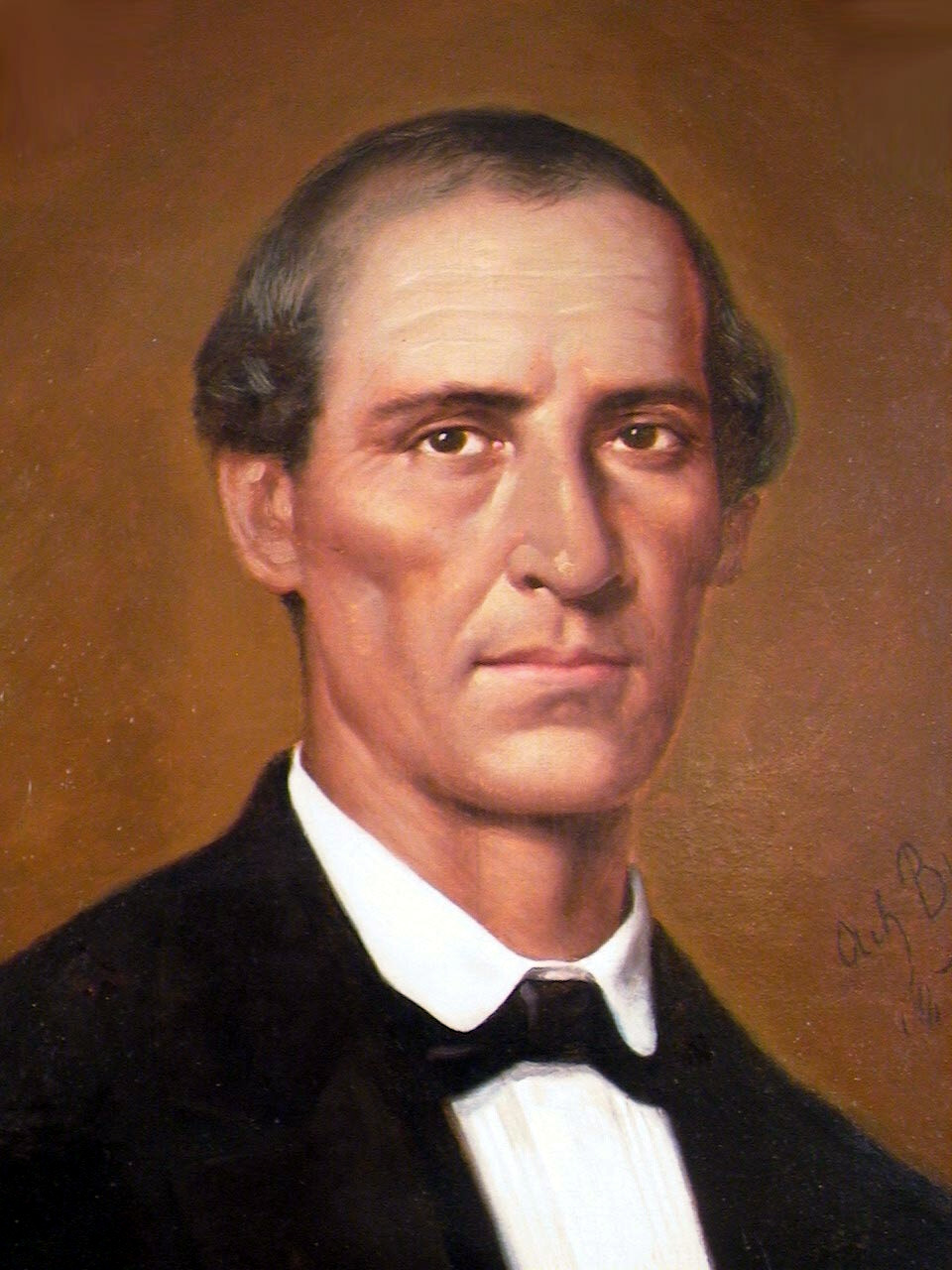
- Incumbent; José María Alfaro Zamora (Last officeholder)
- Style: His Excellency
- Abbreviation: Supreme Chief of Costa Rica
- Seat: San José (1824–1834) (1838–1847); Alajuela (1834–1835); Heredia (1835–1838)
- Appointer: Constituent Assembly / Indirect suffrage
- Term length: Variable, according to the Constitution
- Constituting instrument: Constitution of 1825 (1825-1841) (June-Sep 1842); Decree of Basis and Guarantees (1841-1842); Costa Rican Constitution of 1844 (1844-1846)
- Precursor: Political and military Governor of Costa Rica
- Formation: September 8, 1824
- First holder: Juan Mora Fernández
- Final holder: José María Alfaro Zamora
- Abolished: May 1, 1847
- Superseded by: President of Costa Rica
- Deputy: Vice Head of State

Heads of the Free State of Costa Rica	Province	Term (Election)	Profession	Faction	Vice Head
Liberal Conservative Military
Juan Mora Fernández; 1825 and 1829	San José	1824–1833	Teacher and trader	Liberal	Mariano Montealegre Bustamante (1824–1825); José Rafael de Gallegos y Alvarado (1825–1829)
José Rafael de Gallegos y Alvarado	Cartago	1833–1835 (1833, resigned)	Businessman	Conservative	Manuel Fernández Chacón
Manuel Fernández Chacón	San José	interim	Landowner	Liberal	Vacant
Nicolás Ulloa Soto	Heredia	Appointed in 1835 by Congress, never took office.	Businessman	Conservative	Manuel Fernández Chacón
Braulio Carrillo Colina	Cartago	1835–1837 (1835)	Lawyer	Liberal	Manuel Fernández Chacón
Joaquín Mora Fernández	San José	March–April 1837 interim	Lawyer	Liberal	Manuel Fernández Chacón
Manuel Aguilar Chacón	San José	1837–1838 (1837, deposed by coup led by Carrillo)	Lawyer	Liberal	Juan Mora Fernández
Braulio Carrillo Colina	Cartago	November 14, 1838 – April 8, 1842 (de facto rule, deposed by Morazan)	Lawyer	Liberal	Miguel Carranza Fernández (1838–1841); Manuel Antonio Bonilla Nava (1841–182)
Francisco Morazán	Born in Honduras	April 8 – September 11, 1842 (de facto, deposed)	Military	Liberal	Juan Mora Fernández
Antonio Pinto Soares	Born in Portugal	September 11–27, 1842 (interim)	Military	Liberal	Vacant
José María Alfaro Zamora	Alajuela	27 September 1842-29 November 1844 (interim)	Trader	Liberal	Francisco María Oreamuno Bonilla (1843–1844)
Francisco María Oreamuno Bonilla	Cartago	November 29, 1844 – June 7, 1846 (1844, deposed by Congress after neglecting the office)	Lawyer	Liberal	José María Castro Madriz (1845–1847)
José María Alfaro Zamora	Alajuela	June 7, 1846 – May 1, 1847 (interim)	Trader	Liberal	José María Castro Madriz (1845–1847)

== President of the State of Costa Rica (1847–1848) ==
President of the State of Costa Rica		Province	Term (Election)	Profession	Faction	Vice President
Liberal
1	José María Alfaro Zamora	Alajuela	May 1, 1847 – May 6, 1847 (interim)	Trader	Liberal	José María Castro Madriz
2	José María Castro Madriz	San José	May 8, 1847 – August 31, 1848 (1847)	Lawyer	Liberal	José María Alfaro Zamora (1847); Juan Rafael Mora Porras (1847–1848)

== President of the Republic of Costa Rica (1848–1948) ==
Current title of the head of state and government since the Constitution of 1847. The historiography tends to divide this historical period in two, the previous one to the Costa Rican Civil War of 1948 and the subsequent one to it. During the first period from 1847 to 1948, the liberals almost completely dominated Costa Rican politics. The liberal hegemony only broke briefly with the government of Vicente Herrera Zeledón (who however had been elected by the liberals) who ruled de facto for just over a year between 1876 and 1877. Even the dictator Federico Tinoco whose dictatorship lasted two years was also liberal. In addition, Costa Rican politics was then (and continues to be to some extent) eminently personalist, so political parties such as Civil, National, Peliquista and Republican revolved mostly around leaders and political figures and not ideologies although, in general terms, they usually be diffusely associated with liberalism.

Costa Rican liberalism was also closely linked to the coffee-growing oligarchy and an important sector of the aristocracy. Attempts to create party alternatives not only formally ideological but more to the left were the Reform Party of Father Jorge Volio Jiménez, strongly influenced by the Catholic social teaching and Christian socialism and Manuel Mora Valverde's Workers and Peasants Block (which precisely it would break with the Reform Party after Volio's alliance with the liberal Ricardo Jiménez Oreamuno of the Republican Party) that would lead to the Costa Rican Communist Party. However, even after the war, an important influence of liberal thinking could be seen in the presidents emanated from opposition coalitions as well as within the Social Christian Unity Party.

The National Republican Party led several liberals to the presidency, however, it would be under the government of perhaps its most famous president Rafael Ángel Calderón Guardia that the reforms known as the Social Guarantees would be given for the benefit of the poorest classes and would be one of the triggers of the war of 48.

Presidents of the Republic of Costa Rica		Province	Term (Election)	Profession	Faction/Party	Vice President
Liberal Olympus Military Constitutional Party Civil Party Republican Party National Union Party National National Republican Party
1	José María Castro Madriz	San José	August 31, 1848 – November 15, 1849 (1847, deposed)	Lawyer	Liberal	Manuel José Carazo Bonilla (1848–1849); Juan Rafael Mora Porras (1849)
1.a	Miguel Mora Porras	San José	November 16–26, 1849 (interim)	Trader	Liberal	Vacant
2	Juan Rafael Mora Porras	San José	November 26 – December 30, 1849 – August 14, 1859 (1849, 1853 and 1859. Deposed by Montealegre.)	Empresario	Liberal	Francisco María Oreamuno Bonilla† (1853–1856); Vicente Aguilar Cubero (1856–1857); Rafael García-Escalante Nava (1857–1859)
3	José María Montealegre Fernández	San José	14 August 1859 – 8 May 1863 (de facto after a coup, later elected in 1860)	Medic	Liberal	Abolished; Alternates appointed by Congress.
4	Jesús Jiménez Zamora	Cartago	8 May 1863 – 8 May 1866 (1863)	Medic	Liberal	Abolished; Alternates appointed by Congress.
5	José María Castro Madriz	San José	May 8, 1866 – November 1, 1868 (1866, deposed by Jiménez.)	Lawyer	Liberal	Abolished; Alternates appointed by Congress.
6	Jesús Jiménez Zamora	Cartago	November 1, 1868 – April 27, 1870 (de facto after a coup, elected as single candidate in 1869, deposed by coup led by Guardia.)	Medic	Liberal	Abolished; Alternates appointed by Congress.
7	Bruno Carranza Ramírez	San José	April 27 – August 8, 1870 (interim, appointed by Guardia.)	Medic	Liberal	Abolished; Alternates appointed by Congress.
8	Tomás Guardia Gutiérrez	Guanacaste	August 8, 1870 – May 8, 1876 (de facto after coup, elected in 1872).)	Military	Liberal	Abolished; Alternates appointed by Congress.
9	Aniceto Esquivel Sáenz	Cartago	May 8, 1876 – July 30, 1876 (1876 as Guardia's puppet, deposed by Guardia).	Lawyer	Liberal	Abolished; Alternates appointed by Congress.
10	Vicente Herrera Zeledón	San José	30 July 1876 – 23 September 1877 (Appointed by Guardia, resigns due to health issues.)	Lawyer	Conservative	Abolished; Alternates appointed by Congress.
11	Tomás Guardia Gutiérrez†	Guanacaste	September 23, 1877 – July 6, 1882 (ruled as a dictator, died in office.)	Military	Liberal	Abolished; Alternates appointed by Congress.
12	Saturnino Lizano Gutiérrez	Puntarenas	July 6 – August 10, 1882 (interim)	Trader	Liberal	Abolished; Alternates appointed by Congress.
13	Próspero Fernández Oreamuno†	San José	August 10, 1882 – March 12, 1885 (1882. Died in office)	Philosopher	Olympus	Abolished; Alternates appointed by Congress.
14	Bernardo Soto Alfaro	Alajuela	March 12, 1885 – November 7, 1889 (interim later elected in 1886, resigns.)	Military and lawyer	Olympus	Abolished; Alternates appointed by Congress.
14.a	Carlos Durán Cartín	San José	November 7, 1889 – May 8, 1890 (interim)	Medic	Liberal	Abolished; Alternates appointed by Congress.
15	José Rodríguez Zeledón	San José	8 May 1890 – 8 May 1894 (1889)	Lawyer	Constitutional Party	Abolished; Alternates appointed by Congress.
16	Rafael Yglesias Castro	San José	8 May 1894 – 8 May 1902 (1894 and 1897–1898)	Businessman	Civil Party	Abolished; Alternates appointed by Congress.
17	Ascensión Esquivel Ibarra	Guanacaste	8 May 1902 – 8 May 1906 (1901–1902)	Lawyer	National Union Party	Abolished; Alternates appointed by Congress.
18	Cleto González Víquez	Heredia	8 May 1906 – 8 May 1910 (1905–1906)	Lawyer	National Party	Abolished; Alternates appointed by Congress.
19	Ricardo Jiménez Oreamuno	Cartago	8 May 1910 – 8 May 1914 (1909–1910)	Lawyer	Republican Party	Abolished; Alternates appointed by Congress.
20	Alfredo González Flores	Heredia	May 8, 1914 – January 27, 1917 (Appointed by Congress, deposed in the 1917 Costa Rican coup d'état led by Tinoco).	Lawyer	Republican Party	Abolished; Alternates appointed by Congress.
21	Federico Alberto Tinoco Granados	San José	January 27, 1917 – August 20, 1919 (ruled after coup, elected as single candidate in 1917, deposed by popular uprising).	Businessman	Peliquista Party	Abolished; Alternates appointed by Congress.
22	Juan Bautista Quirós Segura	San José	August 20, 1919 – September 2, 1919 (interim, forced to resign).	Empresario	Peliquista Party	Abolished; Alternates appointed by Congress.
23	Francisco Aguilar Barquero	Cartago	2 September 1919-8 May 1920 (interim).	Teacher	Republican Party	Abolished; Alternates appointed by Congress.
24	Julio Acosta García	Alajuela	8 May 1920-8 May 1924 (1919)	Diplomatic	Constitutional Party	Abolished; Alternates appointed by Congress.
25	Ricardo Jiménez Oreamuno	Cartago	May 8, 1924 – May 8, 1928 (1923)	Lawyer	Republican Party	Abolished; Alternates appointed by Congress.
26	Cleto González Víquez	Heredia	8 May 1928-8 May 1932 (1928)	Lawyer	National Union Party	Abolished; Alternates appointed by Congress.
27	Ricardo Jiménez Oreamuno	Cartago	May 8, 1932 – May 8, 1936 (1932)	Lawyer	National Republican Party	Abolished; Alternates appointed by Congress.
28	León Cortés Castro	Alajuela	8 May 1936-8 May 1940 (1936)	Teacher and lawyer	National Republican Party	Abolished; Alternates appointed by Congress.
29	Rafael Ángel Calderón Guardia	San José	8 May 1940-8 May 1944 (1940)	Medic	National Republican Party	Abolished; Alternates appointed by Congress.
30	Teodoro Picado Michalski	San José	May 8, 1944 – April 19, 1948 (1944, deposed by civil war).	Teacher	National Republican Party	Abolished; Alternates appointed by Congress.
30.a	Santos León Herrera	San José	April 19 – May 8, 1948 (interim).	Engineer	National Republican Party	Abolished; Alternates appointed by Congress.

== Founding Junta of the Second Republic (1948–1949) ==
After the rupture of the constitutional order in 1948 when the third and last Costa Rican Civil War broke out, the victorious side formed by the National Liberation Movement exercised de facto power for 18 months under the self-appointed Founding Junta of the Second Republic chaired by José Figueres Ferrer who proclaimed the beginning of the Second Costa Rican Republic.

Junta Fundadora de la Segunda República	Term	Party
José Figueres Ferrer, Benjamín Odio Odio, Gonzalo Facio Segreda, Alberto Martén Chavarría, Uladislao Gámez Solano, Francisco José Orlich Bolmarcich, Bruce Masís Dibiasi, Raúl Blanco Cervantes, Benjamín Núñez Vargas, Edgar Cardona Quirós, Daniel Oduber Quirós	May 8, 1948 – November 8, 1949	National Liberation Movement

== President of the Republic of Costa Rica (1949-today) ==
José Figueres would hand over the Executive Power to Otilio Ulate Blanco on November 8, 1949, as the alleged winner of the 1948 elections whose annulment by the government of Teodoro Picado and Rafael Ángel Calderón Guardia caused the civil war of the same year. A National Constituent Assembly was also convened that drafted the 1949 Constitution, still in force, and also created the official positions of First and Second Vice presidents of the Republic.

The National Liberation Party, of social democratic ideology and led by the war-winning leader José Figueres Ferrer would become the main political force after 48, but both Calderonistas and liberals would remain active allying with each other, which would allow the governments of Mario Echandi Jiménez and José Joaquín Trejos Fernández. Following the merger of almost all the antiliberacionista opposition grouped in the Unity Coalition in the Social Christian Unity Party in 1983, this party and the National Liberation would form a solid bipartisanism so that all presidents between 1982 and 2014 belonged to one of these two parties. It is in 2014 that bipartisanship is broken with the coming to power of Luis Guillermo Solís Rivera, first president of the post-bipartisan stage and belonging to a party that was not linked to the two major traditional political tendencies (liberationism and calderonism) the Citizens' Action Party that had already been the main opposition force for two previous periods.

Presidents of the Republic of de Costa Rica		Province	Term (Election)	Profession	Party	Vice presidents
National Union Party National Liberation Party Unity Coalition Social Christian Unity Party Citizens' Action Party Social Democratic Progress Party Sovereign People's Party
31	Otilio Ulate Blanco	Alajuela	8 November 1949 – 8 May 1953 (1948)	Journalist	National Union Party	Alberto Oreamuno Flores and Alfredo Volio Mata
32	José Figueres Ferrer	Alajuela	8 May 1953 – 8 May 1958 (1953)	Self-taught	National Liberation Party	Raúl Blanco Cervantes and Fernando Esquivel Bonilla
33	Mario Echandi Jiménez	San José	8 May 1958 – 8 May 1962 (1958)	Businessman	National Union Party	Abelardo Bonilla Baldares and José Joaquín Peralta Esquivel
34	Francisco José Orlich Bolmarcich	Alajuela	8 May 1962 – 8 May 1966 (1962)	Accountant	National Liberation Party	Raúl Blanco Cervantes and Carlos Sáenz Herrera
35	José Joaquín Trejos Fernández	San José	8 May 1966 – 8 May 1970 (1966)	College professor, chemist and mathematician	National Unification Coalition	Jorge Vega Rodríguez and Virgilio Calvo Sánchez
36	José Figueres Ferrer	Alajuela	8 May 1970 – 8 May 1974 (1970)	Self-taught	National Liberation Party	Manuel Aguilar Bonilla and Jorge Rossi Chavarría
37	Daniel Oduber Quirós	San José	8 May 1974 – 8 May 1978 (1974)	Philosopher, lawyer and poet	National Liberation Party	Carlos Manuel Castillo Morales and Fernando Guzmán Mata
38	Rodrigo Carazo Odio	Cartago	8 May 1978 – 8 May 1982 (1978)	Economist	Unity Coalition	Rodrigo Altmann Ortiz and José Miguel Alfaro Rodríguez
39	Luis Alberto Monge Álvarez	Alajuela	8 May 1982 – 8 May 1986 (1982)	Farmer and trade union leader	National Liberation Party	Alberto Fait Lizano and Armando Aráuz Aguilar
40	Óscar Arias Sánchez	Heredia	8 May 1986 – 8 May 1990 (1986)	Businessman and lawyer	National Liberation Party	Jorge Manuel Dengo Obregón and Victoria Garrón Orozco
41	Rafael Ángel Calderón Fournier	Born in Nicaragua	8 May 1990 – 8 May 1994 (1990)	Lawyer	Social Christian Unity Party	Germán Serrano Pinto and Arnoldo López Echandi
42	José María Figueres Olsen	San José	8 May 1994 – 8 May 1998 (1994)	Engineer	National Liberation Party	Rodrigo Oreamuno Blanco and Rebeca Grynspan Mayufis
43	Miguel Ángel Rodríguez Echeverría	San José	8 May 1998 – 8 May 2002 (1998)	Businessman and economist	Social Christian Unity Party	Astrid Fischel Volio and Elizabeth Odio Benito
44	Abel Pacheco de la Espriella	San José	8 May 2002 – 8 May 2006 (2002)	Psychiatrist	Social Christian Unity Party	Lineth Saborío Chaverri and Luis Fishman Zonzinski
45	Óscar Arias Sánchez	Heredia	8 May 2006 – 8 May 2010 (2006)	Businessman and lawyer	National Liberation Party	Laura Chinchilla Miranda and Kevin Casas Zamora
46	Laura Chinchilla Miranda	San José	8 May 2010 – 8 May 2014 (2010)	Political scientist	National Liberation Party	Alfio Piva Mesén and Luis Liberman Ginsburg
47	Luis Guillermo Solís Rivera	San José	8 May 2014 – 8 May 2018 (2014)	College professor, political scientist, sociologist, historian	Citizens' Action Party	Helio Fallas Venegas and Ana Helena Chacón Echeverría
48	Carlos Alvarado Quesada	San José	May 8, 2018 – May 8, 2022 (2018)	Writer, journalist, political scientist	Citizens' Action Party	Epsy Campbell Barr and Marvin Rodríguez Cordero
49	Rodrigo Chaves Robles	San José	May 8, 2022 – May 8, 2026 (2022)	Economist	Social Democratic Progress Party	Stephan Brunner Neibig and Mary Munive Angermüller
50	Laura Fernández Delgado	Puntarenas	May 8, 2026 – present (2026)	Presidency Minister	Sovereign People's Party	Francisco Ernesto Gamboa Soto and Douglas Soto Campos
