= 1829 Costa Rican Head of State election =

- 1 February 1829

44 members of the Electoral College 23 votes needed to win
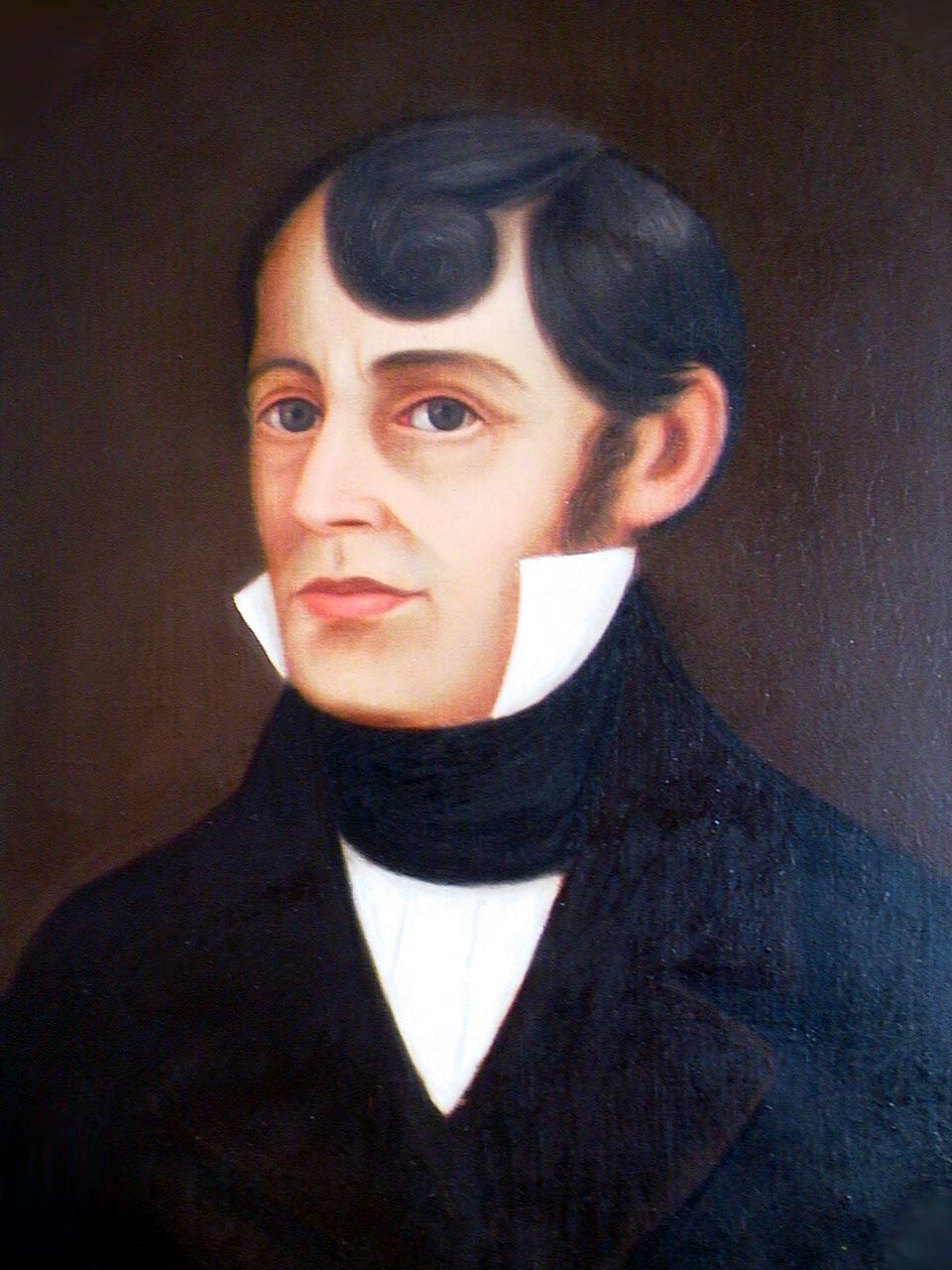
Nominee	Juan Mora Fernández
Party	Independent
Electoral vote	38
Percentage	86.36%
Head of State before election
Juan Mora Fernández
Independent
Elected Head of State
Juan Mora Fernández
Independent

Head of State elections were held in Costa Rica on 1 January 1829. Incumbent Juan Mora Fernández was re-elected to a second four-year term, receiving 86.4% of the electoral vote.

The election was conducted under an indirect electoral system established by the 1825 Fundamental Law. Eligible citizens voted publicly to elect members of the electoral college (electores), who then chose the Head of State. Suffrage was limited to citizens meeting constitutional qualifications, including literacy and other legal requirements. The electoral college consisted of 45 electors distributed among the country's regions: 11 from San José, nine from Alajuela, eight each from Cartago and Heredia, three each from Escazú, Ujarrás, and the recently annexed Partido de Nicoya.

Mora received the unanimous support of the electors from Cartago, Escazú, Ujarrás, and Nicoya. He lost only five electoral votes overall: two from San José, two from Heredia, and one from Alajuela.

== Results ==
Candidate	Votes	%
Juan Mora Fernández	38	86.36
Other candidates	6	13.64
Total	44	100.00
Source: TSE

=== By province ===
Province	Mora	Others
San José	9	2
Cartago	8	0
Heredia	6	2
Alajuela	7	1
Escazú	3	0
Nicoya	3	0
Ujarrás	2	1
Total	38	6
Source: TSE
