= 1833 Costa Rican Head of State election =

- 16 February 1833

42 members of the Electoral College 22 votes needed to win
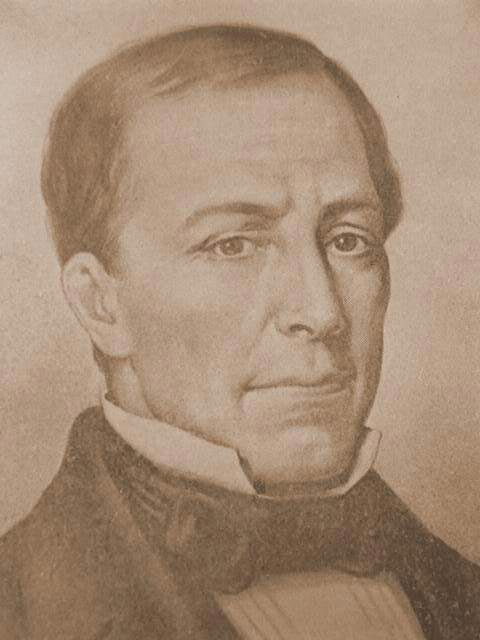

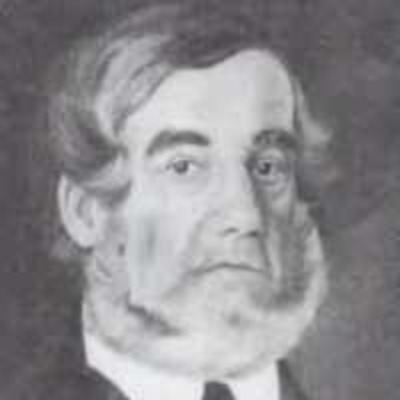
Nominee	Manuel Aguilar Chacón	Nicolás Ulloa Soto
Party	Independent	Independent
Electoral vote	21	18
Percentage	51.22%	43.90%
Head of State before election
Juan Mora Fernández
Independent
Elected Head of State
José Rafael Gallegos
Independent

Head of State elections were held in Costa Rica between 3 and 16 February 1833. Former congressman Manuel Aguilar Chacón, supported primarily by liberal groups in San José and Alajuela, received 21 electoral votes from the second-degree electors chosen in the preceding popular election.

Under the Fundamental Law of the State of Costa Rica, a candidate was required to obtain an absolute majority of the electoral vote. With 42 electors called to participate (1 vote not cast), 22 votes were necessary for election. Aguilar therefore fell one vote short of the required majority, and the election was referred to the Congress.

The state legislature subsequently elected the outgoing Vice Head of State, conservative José Rafael Gallegos, as Head of State, despite his having received only a single electoral vote. Gallegos assumed office following a peaceful transfer of power from the outgoing Head of State, Juan Mora Fernández.

== Results ==
Candidate	Votes	%
Manuel Aguilar Chacón	21	51.22
Nicolás Ulloa Soto	18	43.90
Manuel Fernández Chacón	1	2.44
José Rafael Gallegos	1	2.44
Total	41	100.00
Source: TSE
