= Joaquín de Iglesias =

Costa Rican politician (1794–1840)

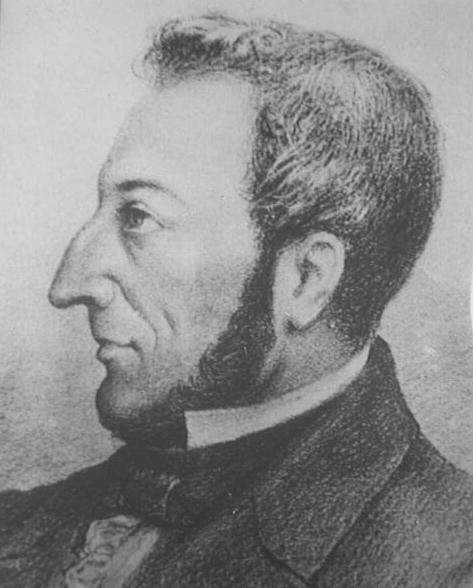

President of the Constitutional Congress
- In office March 1832 – June 1832
- In office January 1833 – February 1833

Deputy of the Constitutional Congress
- In office 1832–1834
- Constituency: Cartago

Mayor of Cartago
- In office 1823–1823

Personal details
- Born: José Joaquín Nicolás de Iglesias Vidamartel; 7 November 1794 Cartago, Captaincy General of Guatemala, Spanish Empire
- Died: 12 April 1840 (aged 45) Near the Pacuare River, Free State of Costa Rica
- Cause of death: Yellow fever
- Citizenship: Costa Rican
- Spouse(s): Petronila Llorente y Lafuente (m. 1818; died 1832); Inés Ugalde y Alfaro (m. 1832; died 1840)
- Children: 14, including Francisco María and Demetrio
- Parent(s): Stefano Corti Rocca and Juana María de Iglesias y Vidamartel
- Occupation: Politician, teacher, and mining entrepreneur

José Joaquín Nicolás de Iglesias Vidamartel (7 November 1794 – 12 April 1840) was a Costa Rican politician and a founding father of Costa Rican independence.

== Biography ==
=== Early years (1794–1821) ===
José Joaquín Nicolás de Iglesias Vidamartel was born in the city of Cartago on 7 November 1794 and was baptized the following day in the local parish. He was the son of Juana María de Iglesias y Vidamartel, a woman belonging to the Cartago elite. Although he was listed in the parish registers as a natural son, family historical tradition documented that his biological father was the Italian-born physician Stefano Corti Rocca.

From a young age, he showed a notable inclination towards letters and studying, which allowed him to join the administrative work of the province early on. During the last years of the viceregal period, he served as an amanuensis to the governor of the Province of Costa Rica, Juan de Dios de Ayala. Later, in 1819, he assumed the position of primary school teacher in Cartago.

=== Independence process and public life (1821–1834) ===
Upon receiving the news of the Independence of Central America in Cartago in October 1821, Iglesias actively joined the political organization process of the new State. He was appointed Secretary of the first Superior Governing Junta of Costa Rica. In the exercise of these duties, he was part of the special commission designated to draft the Interim Fundamental Social Pact or Pact of Concord (promulgated on 1 December 1821), a normative body considered the first Constitution of Costa Rica.

During the political crisis of 1823, derived from attempts to annex the territory to the First Mexican Empire, he adopted a firmly republican stance. He represented the town of Pacaca before the Junta of Legates of the Peoples, of which he also served as secretary. That same year he served as the second mayor of the city of Cartago and assumed the first mayoralty on an interim basis after the incumbent was dismissed on suspicion of disloyalty, managing to maintain local order during the events that triggered the Battle of Ochomogo.

His legislative career reached its peak in 1834, when he was elected deputy and, subsequently, appointed President of the State Assembly. At the same time, he became a candidate and received votes in the 1835 Head of State elections, in which his cousin Braulio Carrillo Colina was elected. He was also appointed on two different occasions as Magistrate of the Supreme Court of Justice of Costa Rica, honors that he decided to decline in order to continue dedicating himself to his private and agricultural activities.

=== The League War, exile in Nicaragua and mining activity ===
In 1834, he was one of the main deputies who supported and voted for the creation of the Ambulance Law, which gave a rotating character to the capital; however, when the government of Braulio Carrillo Colina repealed this law, he was one of the main promoters of the city taking up arms in alliance with Alajuela and Heredia. Iglesias aligned himself with the discontented factions of his hometown, assuming a prominent role in the political direction of the revolutionary movement of the coalition of cities. He participated directly in the deliberations and armed actions of this civil conflict, historically known as the League War.

After the failure of the insurrectional movement and the definitive victory of Carrillo's government forces, a persecution was unleashed against the main ringleaders of the revolt. Iglesias suffered the confiscation of part of his properties and material goods as economic reprisal, and was forced to hurriedly go into exile in Nicaragua to avoid imprisonment.

Established in Nicaraguan territory, specifically in the mountainous and jungle region of Matagalpa, he redirected his efforts towards extractive and mining activities. During this period of exile, he discovered and exploited a gold and silver vein near the town of San Ramón, an economic enterprise that allowed him to stabilize his financial situation, recover part of his fortune, and remotely support his large family that remained in Costa Rica.

=== Return, Atlantic commission and death ===
At the beginning of 1839, under a new political context following Carrillo's definitive return to power through a coup d'état, Iglesias obtained a pardon and official permission to return to Costa Rica. Carrillo appointed him Director of the opening works of the road to the Caribbean Sea, an ambitious state project that sought to provide the country with a direct commercial route to Europe without depending on the port of Puntarenas and the long transit through the Pacific Ocean.

In March 1840, Iglesias led an expedition to the Caribbean plains with the objective of inspecting the progress of the road works and coordinating the establishment of a new agricultural colony on the banks of the Pacuare River. During the course of this work in the tropical jungle, he contracted a "malignant fever". His health rapidly deteriorated due to the aggressiveness of the infection and the lack of medical resources in the area. He died on 12 April 1840 on the banks of the Pacuare River, at the age of 45.

== Marriages and descendants ==
Iglesias married twice. On 5 November 1818, he married his first wife Petronila Llorente y Lafuente, sister of the subsequent first bishop of Costa Rica, Anselmo Llorente y Lafuente. From this union his eldest children were born, among them the prominent politicians and intellectuals Francisco María Iglesias Llorente and Demetrio Iglesias Llorente. After becoming a widower, he entered a second marriage with Inés Ugalde y Alfaro, with whom he had his younger children. His grandson, Rafael Iglesias Castro (son of Demetrio), served as President of the Republic between 1894 and 1902.

== Bibliography ==
- Iglesias Llorente, Francisco María (2021) [1899]. Joaquín de Iglesias y otros escritos (pdf). Serie Manuel María de Peralta (in Spanish). Vol. 3. San José, Costa Rica: Instituto del Servicio Exterior Manuel María de Peralta.
- Fernández Guardia, Ricardo (2007). La guerra de la Liga y la invasión de Quijano (in Spanish). EUNED. ISBN 978-9968-31-538-8.
