= 1825 Costa Rican Head of State election =

- 20 March 1825

39 members of the Electoral College 20 votes needed to win
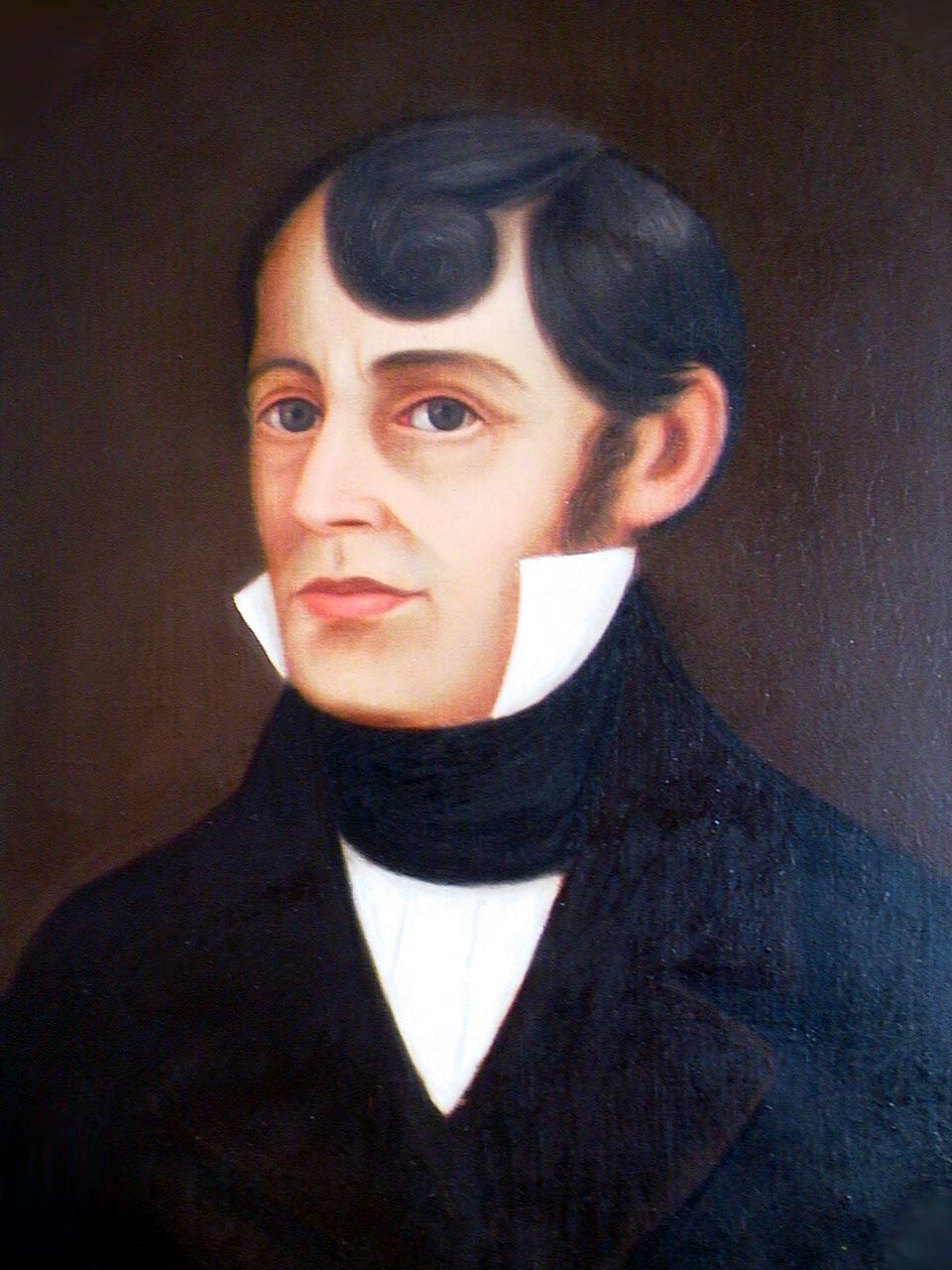

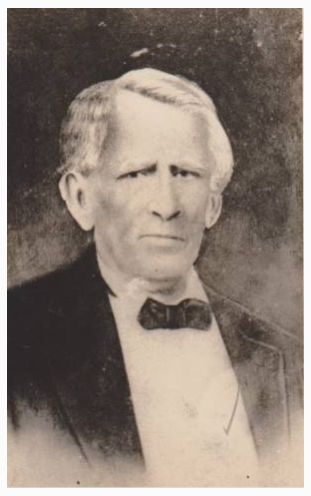
Nominee	Juan Mora Fernández	Mariano Montealegre Bustamante
Party	Independent	Independent
Electoral vote	33	6
Percentage	84.62%	15.38%
Head of State before election
Juan Mora Fernández
Independent
Elected Head of State
Juan Mora Fernández
Independent

Head of State elections were held in Costa Rica on 20 May 1825. Incumbent Juan Mora Fernández, who had served as provisional Head of State since 1824 by appointment of the Constituent Congress, was elected to a full four-year term. He defeated Vice Head of State Mariano Montealegre in the country's first constitutional presidential election.

The election was conducted under an indirect electoral system. Citizens voted publicly to elect electoral delegates (electores), who in turn chose the Head of State. The electoral college comprised 39 electors distributed among the country's regions: 11 from San José, eight each from Cartago and Heredia, five from Alajuela, three from Escazú, two from Ujarrás, and one each from Térraba and Bagaces.

Mora received the votes of the electors from every region except Alajuela, whose five electors unanimously supported Montealegre.

== Results ==
Candidate	Votes	%
Juan Mora Fernández	33	84.62
Mariano Montealegre Bustamante	6	15.38
Total	39	100.00
Source: TSE

=== By province ===
Province	Mora	Montealegre
San José	11	0
Cartago	8	0
Heredia	8	0
Alajuela	0	6
Escazú	3	0
Ujarrás	3	0
Total	33	6
Source: TSE
