= 1847 Costa Rican Head of State election =

- 11 April 1847

154 members of the Electoral College 78 votes needed to win
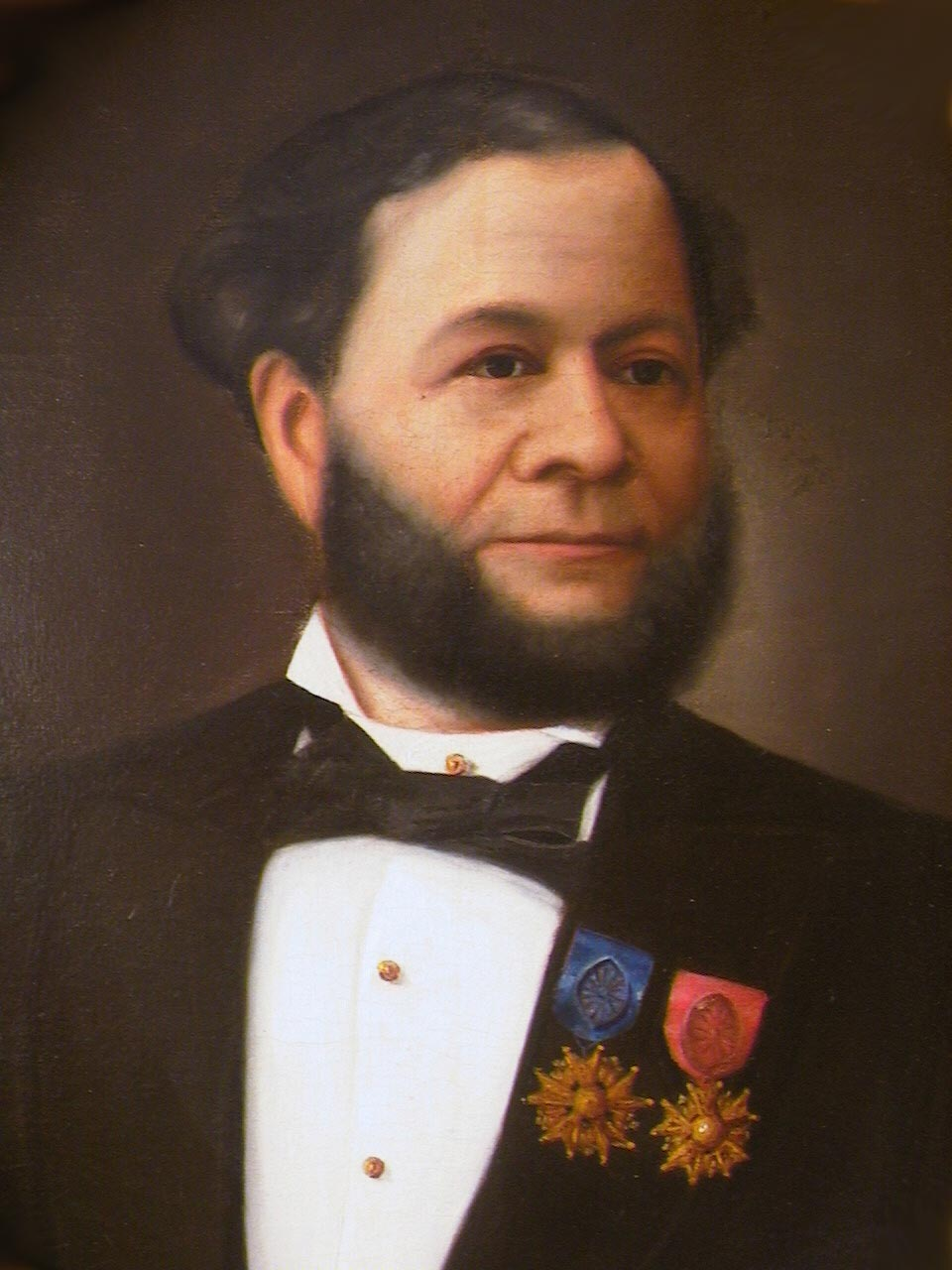

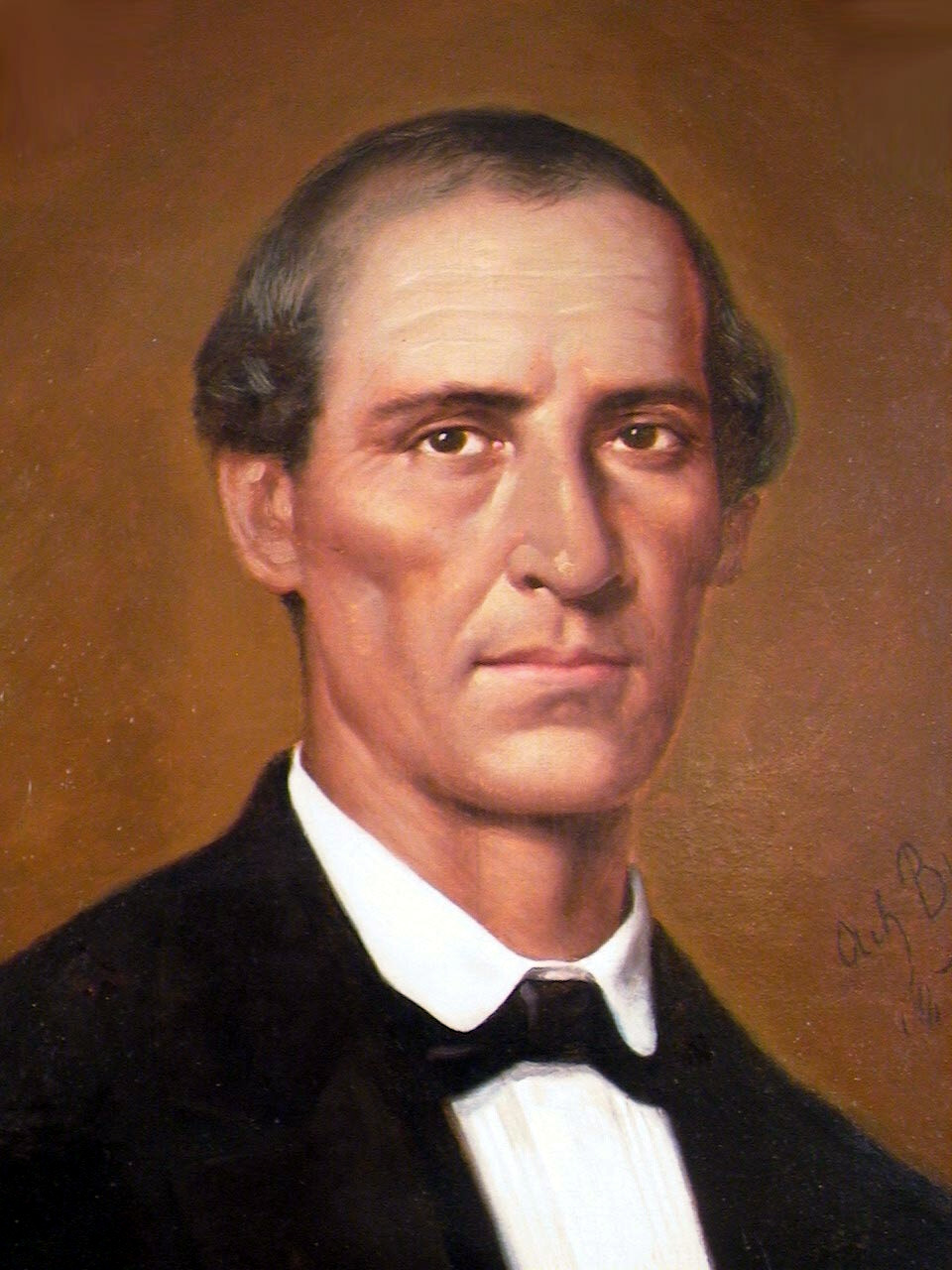
Nominee	José María Castro Madriz	José María Alfaro Zamora
Party	Independent	Independent
Electoral vote	99	52
Percentage	64.29%	33.79%
Head of State before election
José María Alfaro Zamora
Liberal
Elected Head of State
José María Castro Madriz
Liberal

Head of State elections were held in Costa Rica on 11 April 1847 to elect a Head of State for a six-year term. They were the first elections held under the Constitution of 1847 and the last in the country's history to elect a Head of State, as the office was replaced by that of President of the Republic following the proclamation of the Republic in 1848.

The election followed the political crisis that culminated in the overthrow of Francisco María Oreamuno Bonilla. Although Oreamuno had attempted to resign shortly after taking office in December 1844, the legislative chambers never accepted his resignation, and he therefore remained the constitutional Head of State despite exercising no authority. On 7 June 1846, he was formally deposed in a coup d'état, and former head José María Alfaro Zamora assumed power as provisional Head of State. In the election, Alfaro was defeated by Vice Head of State José María Castro Madriz, who won 64.3% of the electoral vote, and instead elected to the vice presidency.

The election was conducted under an indirect electoral system. Eligible male citizens aged 20 or older—or 18 if married or engaged in a recognized profession such as teaching—elected a total of 168 electors, who in turn chose the Head of State and other public officials. The electoral law also provided that, after a five-year transitional period, literacy would become a requirement for voting.

== Results ==
Candidate	Votes	%
José María Castro Madriz	99	64.29
José María Alfaro Zamora	52	33.77
Rafael Moya Murillo	2	1.30
Paulino Ortiz	1	0.65
Total	154	100.00
Source: TSE
