= 1844 Costa Rican Head of State election =

- 2–4 June 1844
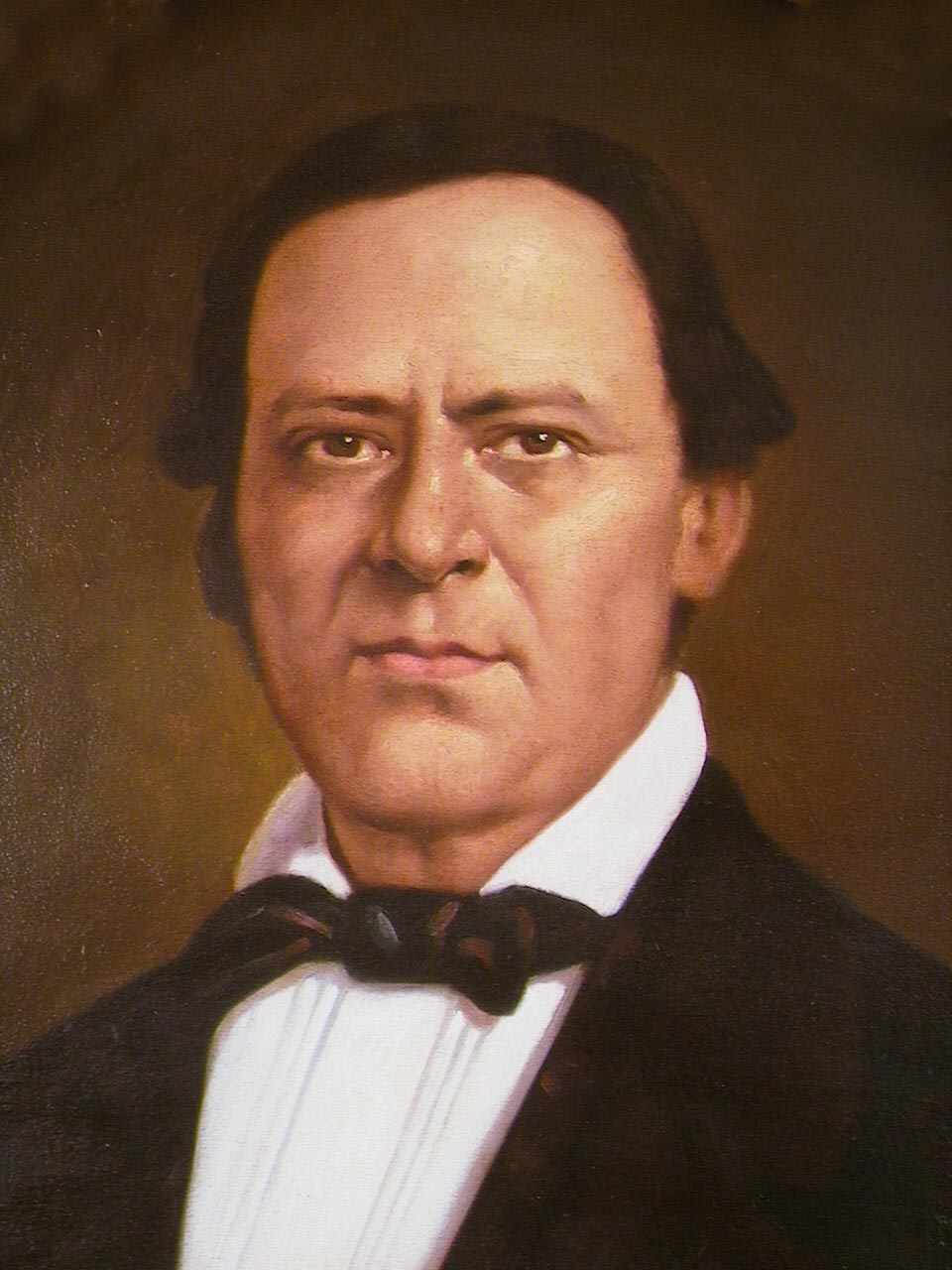

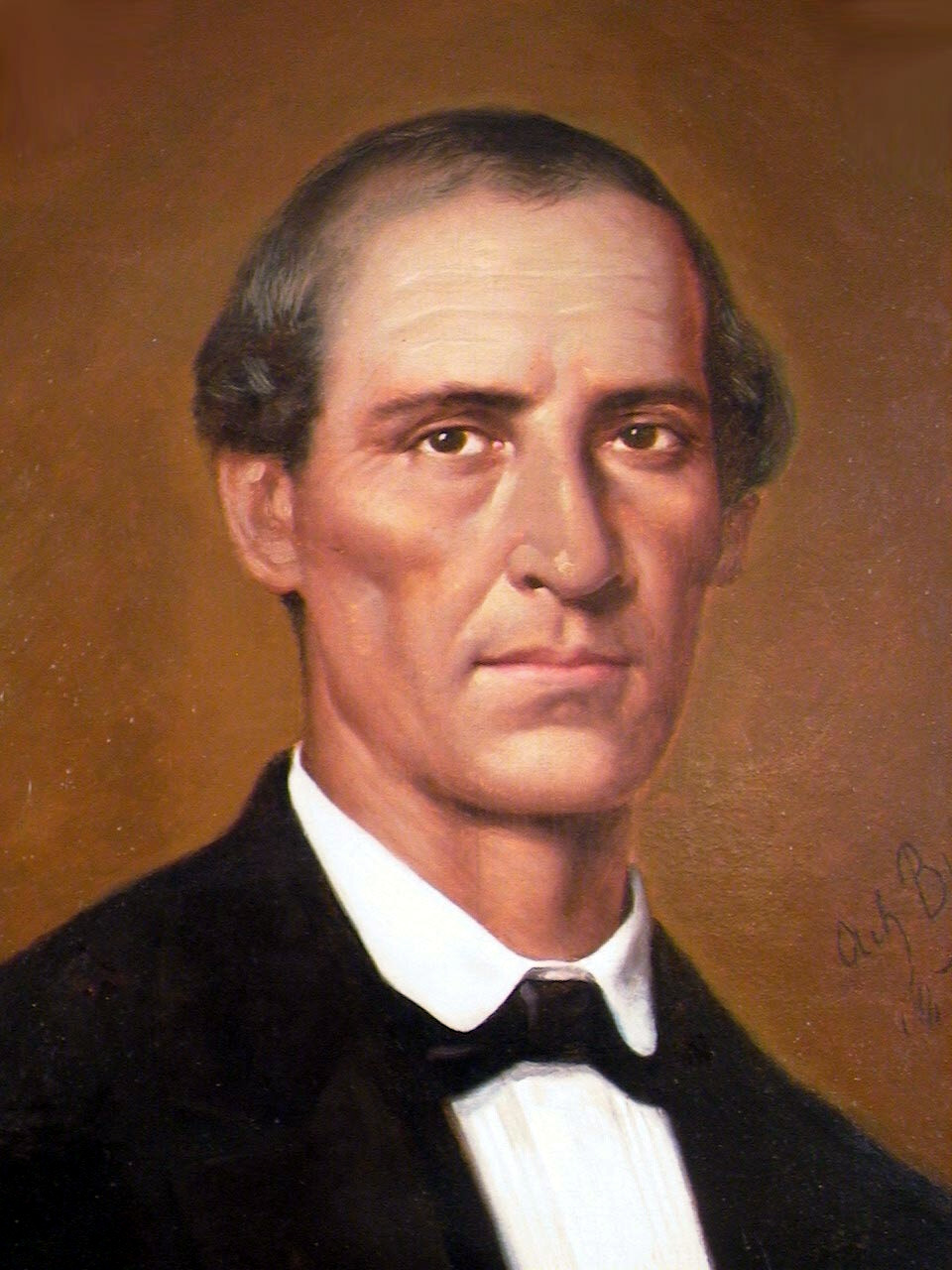
Nominee	Francisco María Oreamuno Bonilla	José María Alfaro Zamora
Party	Independent	Independent
Popular vote	1,541	486
Percentage	67.62%	21.33%
Head of State before election
José María Alfaro Zamora
Independent
Elected Head of State
Francisco María Oreamuno Bonilla
Independent

Head of State elections were held in Costa Rica between 1 and 4 June 1844 to elect a Head of State for a four-year term. They were the first—and only—head of state election in the country's history to be conducted by direct popular vote, as provided for by the Constitution of 9 April 1844. The system was abandoned before the following election under the 1847 Constitution, with Costa Rica returning to indirect presidential elections until 1913.

Vice Head of State Francisco María Oreamuno Bonilla won the election with 67.2% of the vote, defeating the provisional Head of State José María Alfaro Zamora and several other candidates. On 15 November 1844, the legislative chambers formally declared Oreamuno elected for the 1844–1848 term, and he assumed office on 29 November.

The candidacy of Oreamuno triumphed unanimously at the polling stations of Bagaces, Boruca, West Cartago, South Cartago, Cot, Guanacaste, La Union, Orosí, Paraiso, Quircot, San Pablo de Heredia, Santa Cruz, Térraba, Tobosi and Tucurrique, and won comfortable victories in Cartago center, Curridabat, Desamparados, Heredia center, San José north and San José south. Alfaro won at the polls of West Alajuela, East Alajuela, Atenas, Barva, Cañas, Esparza and Puntarenas, Nicoya and San Juan del Murciélago. Mora triumphed in Escazú and Pacaca, and Blanco in Aserrí. None of the other candidates won in any polling area.

== Results ==
Candidate	Votes	%
Francisco María Oreamuno Bonilla	1,541	67.62
José María Alfaro Zamora	486	21.33
Juan Mora Fernández	97	4.26
Luz Blanco	65	2.85
José Rafael Gallegos	12	0.53
Other candidates	78	3.42
Total	2,279	100.00
Source: TSE
