= Raúl Blanco =

Raúl Blanco may refer to:

- Raúl Blanco Cervantes (1903–1979), Costa Rican physician and politician
- Raúl Blanco (footballer, born 1941), Argentine football coach and former defender
- Raúl Blanco (footballer, born 2001), Spanish football midfielder for Casa Pia

== See also ==
- Raúl González Blanco (born 1977), known as just Raúl, Spanish football manager and former forward
