= Abelardo Bonilla Baldares =

Costa Rican intellectual and politician (1898–1969)

Abelardo Bonilla Baldares AXS
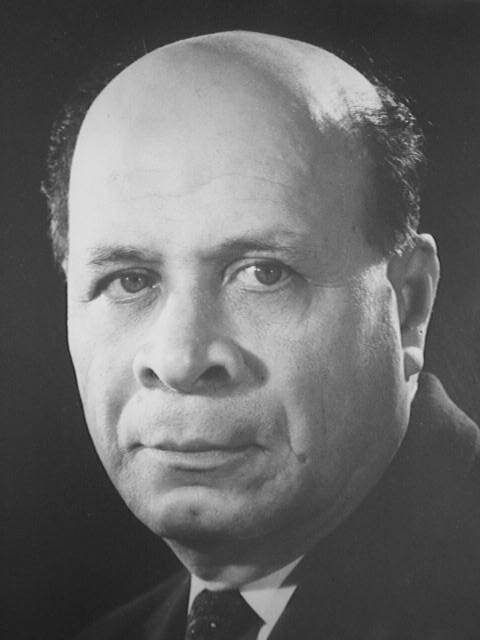
- Bonilla c. 1952

Second Vice President of Costa Rica
- In office 8 May 1958 – 8 May 1962 Serving with Joaquín Peralta Esquivel
- President: Mario Echandi Jiménez
- Preceded by: Raúl Blanco Cervantes
- Succeeded by: Raúl Blanco Cervantes

2nd President of the Legislative Assembly of Costa Rica
- In office 1 May 1952 – 30 October 1953
- Preceded by: Marcial Rodríguez Conejo
- Succeeded by: Gonzalo Facio Segreda

Deputy of the Legislative Assembly of Costa Rica
- In office 1 November 1949 – 30 October 1953
- Preceded by: Office established
- Succeeded by: Luis Bonilla Castro
- Constituency: San José (8th Office)

Personal details
- Born: José Abelardo Teodoro Bonilla Baldares; 5 December 1898 Cartago, Costa Rica
- Died: 12 January 1969 (aged 70) San José, Costa Rica
- Party: PUN
- Spouse: María Rosa Picado Chacón (m. 1952)
- Occupation: Journalist; politician; professor; writer

José Abelardo Teodoro Bonilla Baldares (5 December 1898 – 12 January 1969) was a Costa Rican journalist, academic and politician who served as Second Vice President of Costa Rica from 1958 to 1962. A member of the National Union Party, he was previously a deputy in the Legislative Assembly from 1949 to 1953 and served as President of the Legislative Assembly from 1952 to 1953.

Born in Cartago to Juan Andrés Bonilla and Balsamira Baldares, Bonilla studied law at the School of Law of Costa Rica, although he did not complete his degree. Despite lacking formal legal qualifications, he became one of Costa Rica's most prominent intellectuals, dedicating his career to scholarship, teaching, journalism, and literary criticism. Following the establishment of the University of Costa Rica in 1940, he joined its faculty as one of its founding professors.

Throughout his academic career, Bonilla taught in the Faculties of Law, Philosophy, and Letters, holding chairs in Philosophy of Law, Aesthetics, Spanish Literature, and Cultural History. He later directed the Chair of Cultural History within the university's General Studies program from 1957 to 1964 and also served as a visiting professor at the University of Kansas. His academic work focused on philosophy, literature (including children's literature), aesthetics, and the humanities, fields in which he became a recognized authority.

Alongside his teaching career, Bonilla was active in journalism. He contributed articles, essays, and editorials to the Diario de Costa Rica and later to La Nación, writing on cultural, literary, and philosophical subjects. His work was also published in foreign journals and periodicals.

Following the Costa Rican Civil War, Bonilla participated in the country's political reorganization. He served on the commission responsible for preparing the draft of the 1949 Constitution and was subsequently elected deputy for San José to the first Legislative Assembly established under the new constitutional order. During his term, from 1949 to 1953, he was elected President of the Legislative Assembly for the 1952–1953 session.

In 1957, presidential candidate Mario Echandi Jiménez selected Bonilla as his running mate in the 1958 general election. Following Echandi's victory, Bonilla served as Second Vice President of Costa Rica from 1958 to 1962. Although the vice presidency carried limited constitutional responsibilities, he occasionally exercised executive functions as acting president while continuing his academic activities at the University of Costa Rica.

Bonilla was elected a member of the Costa Rican Academy of Language in 1955 to succeed former president Julio Acosta García, occupying Chair G. He died in San José on 19 January 1969.
