= Joaquín Mora Fernández =

President of Costa Rica

Joaquín Mora Fernández (16 January 1786 – 26 October 1862) was the provisional head of state of Costa Rica from 1 March to 17 April 1837.

== Early and personal life ==
Joaquín Mora Fernández was born in San José, Costa Rica, on 16 January 1786. He was the son of Mateo Mora y Valverde and Lucía Encarnación Fernández y Umaña, who were also the parents of the first head of state, Juan Mora Fernández.

He got married in San José on 27 November 1819 to María del Pilar Bonilla y Nava (1804–1866), granddaughter of Spanish Governor José Joaquín de Nava y Cabezudo. They had five children: Mateo, Catalina, Rafaela, Pilar and María del Carmen Mora Bonilla.

== Career ==
He was commissioned in Costa Rica in Granada, Nicaragua (1822), a member of the special seat of judgement that tried the royal coup participant Joaquín de Oreamuno y Muñoz de la Trinidad (1823), a member of the Representative Council (1829–1831 and 1836–1838) and an alternate judge of the Supreme Court of Costa Rica (1832).

On 1 March 1837, for completing the period of the Chief of Braulio Carrillo Colina and having not yet declared the election of his successor, he was named by the Legislative Assembly to exercise the executive branch as the Provisional Supreme Chief. He held this position until 17 April 1837.

During his administration, he issued a decree that ordered the authorities to move the port of Puntarenas and Caldera to build the necessary buildings on it. It also issued a general rate of salaries and equipment of public officials.

== Exile and death ==
In January 1839, Mora was accused of conspiring against the government of Braulio Carrillo Colina and of planning his murder. He vehemently rejected the charges but was sentenced to death. However, on the 18th of that month, Carrillo decided to commute the sentence of death by removing the death penalty.

Puntarenas passed in 1840 on the steamer Eagle, from Valparaíso. Although he made no attempt to land, port authorities demanded that the captain of the ship deliver them to Mora. The captain refused, and the ship left immediately. Given this fact, Braulio Carrillo Colina issued a decree which stated that if Joaquin Mora Fernandez reached anywhere within the territory of Costa Rica, he should be shot immediately.

He returned to Costa Rica after the fall of Carrillo and stayed away from politics, being devoted to the management of their coffee plantations. Fernandez died in San José, Costa Rica, on 26 October 1862.

Political offices
Preceded by Braulio Carrillo Colina	Head of State of Costa Rica; March–April 1837	Succeeded by Manuel Aguilar Chacón
