= Rafael Moya Murillo =

Costa Rican politician and businessman (1799–1864)

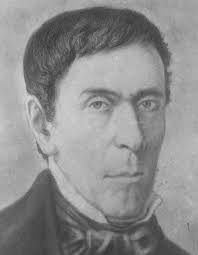
- Moya in 1835

Head of State of Costa Rica
- Acting
- In office 29 November 1844 – 30 April 1845
- Preceded by: Francisco Oreamuno Bonilla
- Succeeded by: José Rafael Gallegos y Alvarado (acting)

Member of the Senate for Heredia
- In office 2 October 1844 – 30 April 1845

Personal details
- Born: Rafael Moya Murillo; 24 October 1799 Heredia, Province of Costa Rica, Captaincy General of Guatemala, Spanish Empire
- Died: 15 November 1864 (aged 65) Heredia, Costa Rica
- Party: Independent

Rafael Moya Murillo (24 October 1799 – 15 November 1864) was a Costa Rican businessman and politician who served as Acting Head of State of Costa Rica from 1844 to 1845.

He was the son of José Moya y Saborido and Micaela Murillo y Rojas. He worked as a farmer and became one of the largest coffee growers in the province of Heredia. He also took an interest in mining and trade. In 1844 he was elected to the Costa Rican Senate. As the oldest senator he was temporarily put in charge of the country's Head of State on 29 November 1844 and held that position until 30 April 1845.

He got votes in the presidential election of 1847 and a considerable number of electors supported his presidential candidacy in the election of 1849, which was won by Juan Rafael Mora Porras.

He died in Heredia, Costa Rica, on 15 November 1864.
