= Fundamental Law of the State of Costa Rica =

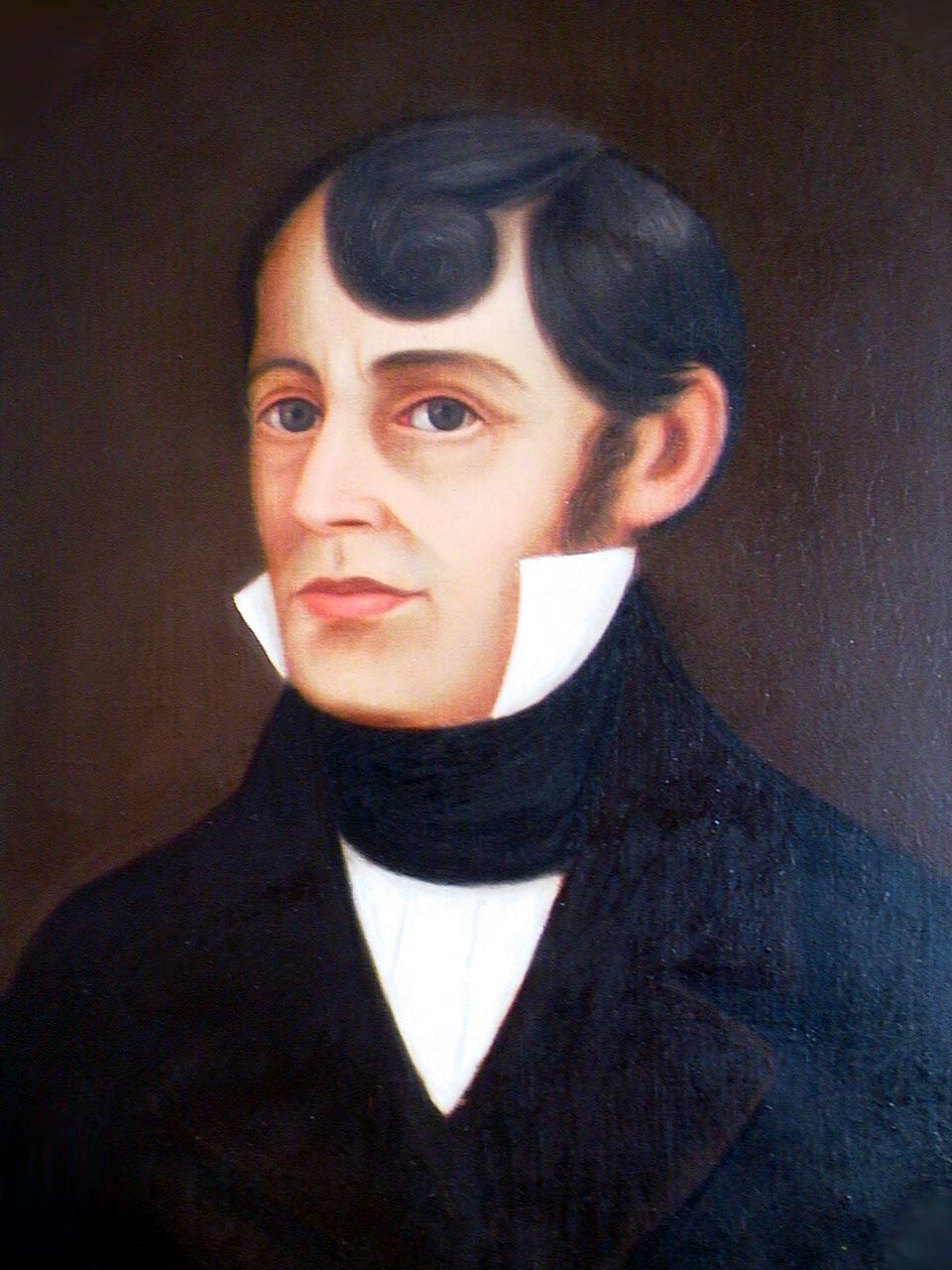
Juan Mora Fernández

The Fundamental Law of the Free State of Costa Rica, sometimes called the Political Constitution of 1825, was issued on 25 January 1825 by the Constituent Congress of Costa Rica, while the country was a formal member of the Federal Republic of Central America. It functioned until it was abrogated by Braulio Carrillo Colina who in 1838 took power in a coup. On 8 March 1841 he issued the Decree of Basis and Guarantees that operated as a de facto constitution until the arrival of Francisco Morazán in 1844 who overthrew Carrillo in turn and temporarily restored the Fundamental Law.

== History ==
Costa Rica was one of the most disciplined member states of the Central American Federal Republic, following the mandates of the federal government. The government conducted the corresponding elections for federal offices, sending soldiers to swell the federal army and paying taxes. After the Bases were issued by the National Constituent Assembly of Central America, instructions were given to member countries to establish local congresses and create state constitutions. This was done and the Fundamental Law of the State emanated from this process.

Carrillo, who had been Head of State, resented the inaction of the Federal Republic before the annexation of Bocas del Toro in 1836 by Colombia. He was victorious during the 1835 Costa Rican civil war in the cities of San Jose, Alajuela, Heredia and Cartago. He was a candidate for re-election against the federalist candidate Manuel Aguilar Chacón in the election of 1837. Aguilar was a convinced supporter of the Federal Republic. Aguilar wins, but Carrillo undertook a coup with the help of the Army, taking power just before the Central American Federation dissolved.

The Assembly issued the Bases of Federal Constitution in 1823 and the Constitution of the Federal Republic of Central America in 1824. On 5 May 1824, the National Constituent Assembly of Central America mandated member states to convene constituent congresses to establish state constitutions.

=== Constituent Congress ===
The Constituent Congress of the State of Costa Rica met from 1824 to 1825. It was the first Constituent Assembly convened in Costa Rica and produced the Fundamental Law. It was convened as part of the United Provinces of Central America, newly independent from Spain.

The Constituent prerogative and Legislative Branch powers were important elements of the task. The work was limited by the foundations of the Central American Constitution, to which it must comply.

The Congress consisted of ten members, its president was Nazario Toledo, his secretary Rafael Ramírez and his assistant secretary Gordiano Paniagua. Juan Mora Fernández was Provisional Supreme Chief in this period, but he was not part of the Congress. The Congress also defined the country's flag and coat of arms.

This Constitution was in force until it was repealed by Carrillo when he took power in 1838.

== Content ==
The Law prescribed the third-grade vote (based on the Cádiz Constitution) in which male citizens elected second-degree electors in parochial elections, parishes elected other first-degree electors by department, and finally elected policies.

It created the Executive, Legislative and Judicial branches, as well as a fourth branch, called the Conservative Branch, which exercised state control, similar to the current Comptroller. It abolished the fueros to the military and the Church and drafted citizen rights. It chose the official name of Free State of Costa Rica.

The Head or Deputy Chief of State must be a Costa Rican by birth, a lay person, at least thirty years-old and owner of property worth not less than one thousand pesos or an annual income of two hundred pesos, or be a science professional. It also prescribed a term of four years, limited to two consecutive terms.

The Legislative Branch (called Congress) was unicameral. Election was by popular vote. Among its powers was enacting legislation. It was also responsible to guard the Constitution, decree loans, commute sentences, issue pardons, receive the resignations of the members of the Supreme Powers and establish state borders.
