= José María Alfaro Zamora =

Head of State of Costa Rica (1842–1844, 1846–1847)

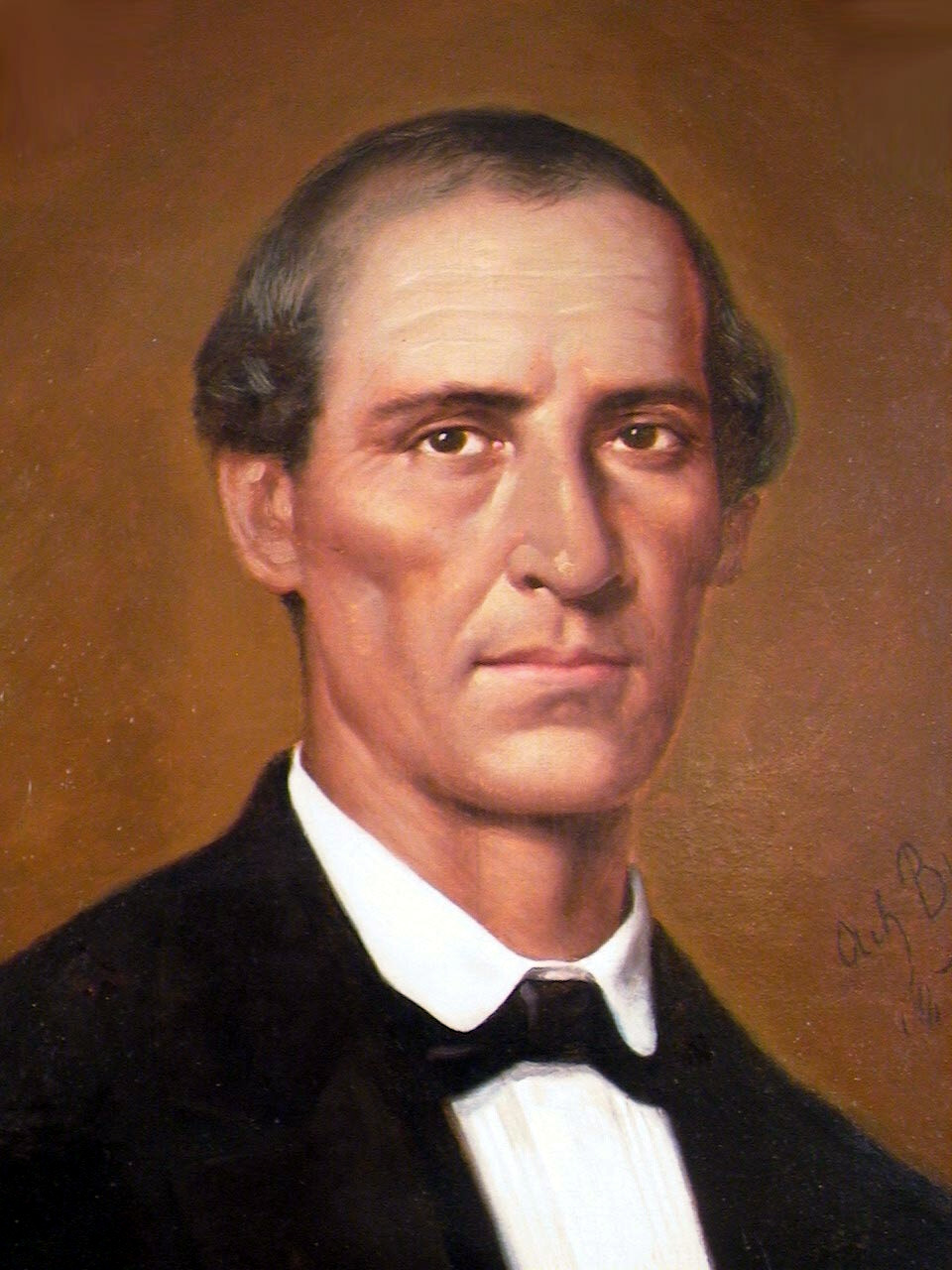
- Official portrait at the Legislative Assembly's Gallery of Former Presidents of Costa Rica

President of the State of Costa Rica
- In office 1 May 1847 – 8 May 1847
- Vice President: José María Castro Madriz
- Preceded by: Position established
- Succeeded by: José María Castro Madriz

Head of State of Costa Rica
- In office 7 June 1846 – 1 May 1847
- Deputy: José María Castro Madriz
- Preceded by: Francisco Oreamuno Bonilla
- Succeeded by: Himsef (as President)
- In office 27 September 1842 – 29 November 1844
- Deputy: Francisco Oreamuno Bonilla; José María Castro Madriz
- Preceded by: Antonio Pinto Soares (acting)
- Succeeded by: Francisco Oreamuno Bonilla

Personal details
- Born: José María Alfaro Zamora; 20 March 1799 Alajuela, Province of Costa Rica, Captaincy General of Guatemala, Spanish Empire
- Died: 12 June 1856 (aged 57) Alajuela, Costa Rica
- Party: Independent
- Spouse: María Josefa Sandoval y Jiménez (m. 1825)
- Children: 2

José María Alfaro Zamora (20 March 1799 – 12 June 1856) was a Costa Rican businessman and politician who served as Head of State of Costa Rica from 1842 to 1844 and from 1846 to 1847.

== Early life and family ==
Alfaro was born in Alajuela, Costa Rica, then part of the Viceroyalty of New Spain, on 20 March 1799, to his parents Juan Antonio Alfaro y Arias and María Damiana Zamora y Flores. On 19 May 1825, he married María Josefa Sandoval y Jiménez. With her he fathered José Joaquín Alfaro Sandoval, a daughter who died early in her childhood, and Calixto Alfaro Sandoval.

Alfaro was a farmer and a businessman. He owned lands devoted to coffee plantation and a sawmill in Itiquís near Alajuela. He also participated in a lumber company in Jinotepe, Nicaragua.

== Public activities ==
He served as supply deputy for Alajuela (1825-1827), second mayor of Alajuela (1828), deputy for Alajuela (1829-1831), deputy for Heredia (1834-1836), political leader of the western department (1841) and magistrate of the Judicial Chamber (1841-1842).

On September 27, 1842, in a junta convocated by then Head of State Antonio Pinto Soares, José María Alfaro Zamora was designated Provisional Head of State. He advocated for a free press and a restoration of some political rights which had been curtailed in previous years. During his administration he built the road that connects San José to Puntarenas, founded Universidad de Santo Tomás, emitted the 1844 Constitution, and founded the newspaper "Mentor Costarricense". He lost the 1844 elections to Francisco María Oreamuno Bonilla. On 29 November 1844, he gave Oreamuno his office which was meant to last until 1848.

On 7 June 1846, after a coup d'état Alfaro was again declared Provisional Head of State. During this administration Puntarenas was declared a free port, the 1847 Constitution was emitted and a failed diplomatic mission with Nicaragua was launched in a second attempt to sign a border agreement with this country (a previous attempt by Braulio Carrillo in 1838 had also failed). Although he lost the 1847 elections to José María Castro Madriz he won the office of Vice President for the next term.

In order to comply with the new Constitution, from 1 May to 8 May 1847, he used the title President of the State. On 8 May 1847, he was succeeded by Castro. In May 1847, he became Vice President of the State, but he had to quit months after. Accused of corruption, he was confined to Térraba and later moved to Panama.

== Aftermath and death ==
He later returned to Costa Rica but refused to participate in politics. He died in Alajuela on 11 June 1856, due to cholera.

Political offices
Preceded by António Pinto Soares	Head of State of Costa Rica; 1842-1844	Succeeded by Francisco María Oreamuno Bonilla
Preceded by José Rafael Gallegos	Head of State of Costa Rica; 1846-1847	Succeeded by José María Castro Madriz
