= Miguel Carranza Fernández =

Costa Rican politician (1780- 1841)

Miguel Carranza Fernández (1780, San José – 1841) was a Costa Rican politician.

He was responsible for Costa Rica's first printing press, the Imprenta La Paz, established in 1830, which published the country's first newspaper and first book.

A son, Bruno Carranza Ramírez, went on to become interim President of Costa Rica for three months.
