= Francisco María Oreamuno Bonilla =

Head of State of Costa Rica in 1844

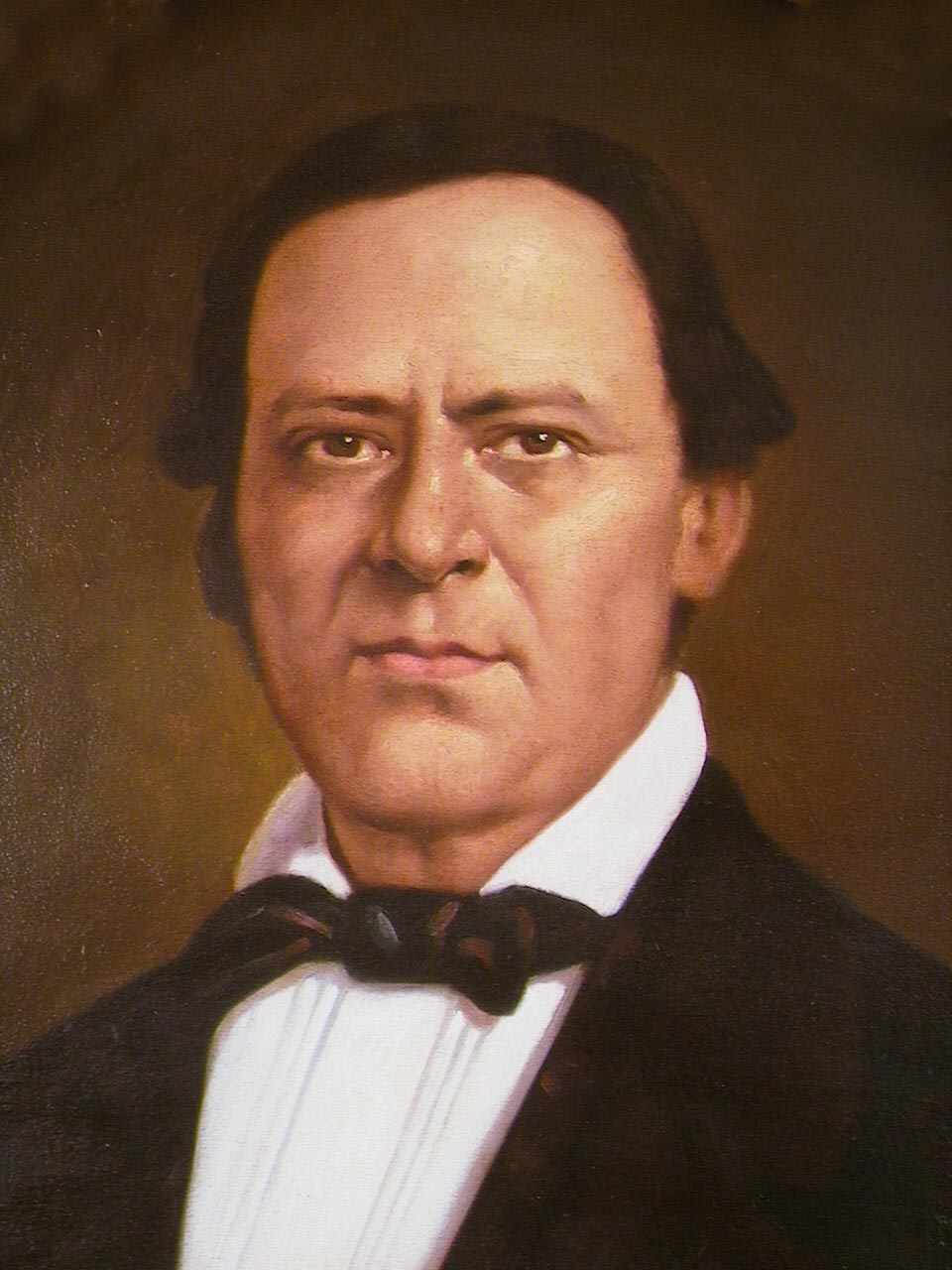
- Portrait by Aquiles Bigot

Vice President of Costa Rica
- In office 23 February 1850 – 23 May 1856
- President: Juan Rafael Mora Porras
- Preceded by: Juan Rafael Mora Porras
- Succeeded by: Vicente Aguilar Cubero

8th Head of State of Costa Rica
- In office 21 November 1844 – 17 December 1844
- Deputy: Vacant
- Preceded by: José María Alfaro Zamora
- Succeeded by: Rafael Moya Murillo (acting)

Vice Head of State of Costa Rica
- In office 8 June 1843 – 21 November 1844
- President: José María Alfaro Zamora
- Preceded by: Juan Mora Fernández (1842)
- Succeeded by: José María Castro Madriz (1846)

Deputy of the Congress of Costa Rica
- In office 1826–1828
- Constituency: Cartago

Personal details
- Born: Francisco María Oreamuno Bonilla; 4 October 1801 Cartago, Costa Rica
- Died: 23 May 1856 (aged 54) San José, Costa Rica

Francisco María Oreamuno Bonilla (4 October 1801 – 23 May 1856) was a Costa Rican politician who was Head of State of Costa Rica from November to December 1844.

== Personal life ==
Oreamuno was the son of Isidro de Oreamuno y Alvarado and Justa de Bonilla y Laya-Bolívar. He studied Latin with Hipólito Calvo Rosales and philosophy with Rafael Francisco Osejo. On June 7, 1827, Oreamuno married Nicaraguan Agustina Gutiérrez y La Peña-Monjehija, the daughter of Agustín Gutiérrez y Lizaurzábal and Josefa de La Peña-Monje y La Cerda. The couple had four children: María Esmeralda, Francisco José, Jesús María and Salvador.

== Political career ==
Oreamuno became involved in politics in 1821. He served as a judge in Minas del Aguacate (1824), the third mayor of Cartago (1826), a legislator for Cartago (1826-1828), a member of the Court of Auditors (1826-1827), and was regidor and interim Municipal President of Cartago (1831). He also held the roles of Federal Customs Administrator of Puntarenas (1831-1838), General State Administrator (1838 and 1842), Commissioner of Costa Rica in Nicaragua (1838), Trial Court Justice of Cartago (1841), Constituent Assembly member (1843-1844), Vice Chief of Staff (1843-1844), Minister of Finance, Public Education and the Navy (1847), Governor of Cartago (1849-1850), Vice President of the Republic (1850-1856) and President of Congress (1850-1856).

In the 1844 Costa Rican elections, the first that used a direct voting system, he achieved an overwhelming victory against the provisional Head of State, José María Alfaro Zamora, and 28 other candidates. He started his tenure on 21 November 1844 and was supposed to continue in the role until 1848. However, he voluntarily resigned and returned to Cartago; his resignation was not accepted. He was temporarily replaced by Rafael Moya Murillo (1844-1845) and José Rafael Gallegos (1845-1846).

In April 1845, the legislature suspended him from office, declared that there was cause for proceedings against him and ordered that criminal proceedings be opened against him for abandoning his post, but he remained the titular head of state until 7 June 1846 when a military coup ended the constitutional government.

In 1850, he became Vice President of Costa Rica under President Juan Rafael Mora Porras.

== Later life and death ==
He was a wealthy landowner and raised coffee and livestock in Cartago. He also wrote for the weekly publication La Paz y el Progreso.

In 1856, a severe cholera epidemic swept through Costa Rica, killing 10% of the population. Oreamuno caught cholera and died on 23 May 1856.

== Legacy ==
In 1914, one of the cantons of Cartago province was named Oreamuno after him. His son-in-law Jesús Jiménez Zamora and his grandson Ricardo Jiménez Oreamuno were both Presidents of Costa Rica.

Political offices
| Preceded by José María Alfaro | Head of State of Costa Rica; Nov-Dec 1844 | Succeeded by José Rafael Gallegos |
