= Raúl Blanco Cervantes =

Costa Rican physician and politician (1903–1979)

First Vice President of Costa Rica
- In office 8 May 1962 – 8 May 1966 Serving with Carlos Sáenz Herrera
- President: Francisco Orlich Bolmarcich
- Preceded by: Abelardo Bonilla Baldares
- Succeeded by: Jorge Vega Rodríguez
- In office 8 November 1953 – 8 May 1958 Serving with Fernando Esquivel Bonilla
- President: José Figueres Ferrer
- Preceded by: Alberto Oreamuno Flores
- Succeeded by: Abelardo Bonilla Baldares

Minister of Public Health
- In office 8 May 1948 – 8 November 1949
- President: José Figueres Ferrer
- Preceded by: Solón Núñez Frutos
- Succeeded by: Carlos Sáenz Herrera

Personal details
- Born: Raúl Carlos Rafael Blanco Cervantes; 10 April 1903 San José, Costa Rica
- Died: 7 May 1979 (aged 76)
- Party: PLN
- Spouse: Dora Martén Chavarría (m. 1938)
- Children: 6
- Education: Ludwig-Maximilians-Universität München (MBBS)
- Occupation: Physician; surgeon; politician

Raúl Carlos Rafael Blanco Cervantes (10 April 1903 – 7 May 1979) was a Costa Rican physician and politician who served as First Vice President of Costa Rica from 1953 to 1958 and from 1962 to 1966. A member of the National Liberation Party, he was a leading figure in the fight against tuberculosis in Costa Rica and played a prominent role in the development of the country's public health system during the mid-20th century. He was a member of the Founding Junta of the Second Republic from 1948 to 1949 as Minister of Public Health.

Blanco Cervantes was born in San José on 10 April 1903 into a working-class family. The son of Macedonio Blanco, a merchant, and Dolores Cervantes, a homemaker, he was the third of six children. After completing his secondary education at the Liceo de Costa Rica, he traveled to Germany in 1922 to study medicine. He attended Leipzig University, the University of Jena, and the Ludwig-Maximilians-Universität München, graduating with honors in Medicine and Surgery in 1928. After undertaking postgraduate studies in Germany, he returned to Costa Rica in 1929 and completed an internship at San Juan de Dios Hospital, where he subsequently joined the medical staff.

In 1933, Blanco Cervantes was appointed director of the Durán Sanatorium, a tuberculosis treatment center in Tierra Blanca, Cartago, founded by physician Carlos Durán Cartín. He later held several positions related to tuberculosis prevention and treatment, including director of the Anti-Tuberculosis Department of the Ministry of Health, the Anti-Tuberculosis Dispensary, and the National Preventorium. Through these roles, he became one of the country's leading specialists in the control and prevention of tuberculosis.

Blanco Cervantes also held leadership positions in numerous professional and scientific organizations. He served as prosecutor, board member, and later president of the College of Physicians and Surgeons of Costa Rica. He was a founding member and first president of the Central American Society of Phthisiology, an honorary governor of the American College of Chest Physicians, an honorary member of the Mexican Society of Phthisiology, and a member of the World Health Organization Expert Committee on Tuberculosis.
