= Manuel Aguilar Chacón =

Head of State of Costa Rica from 1837 to 1838

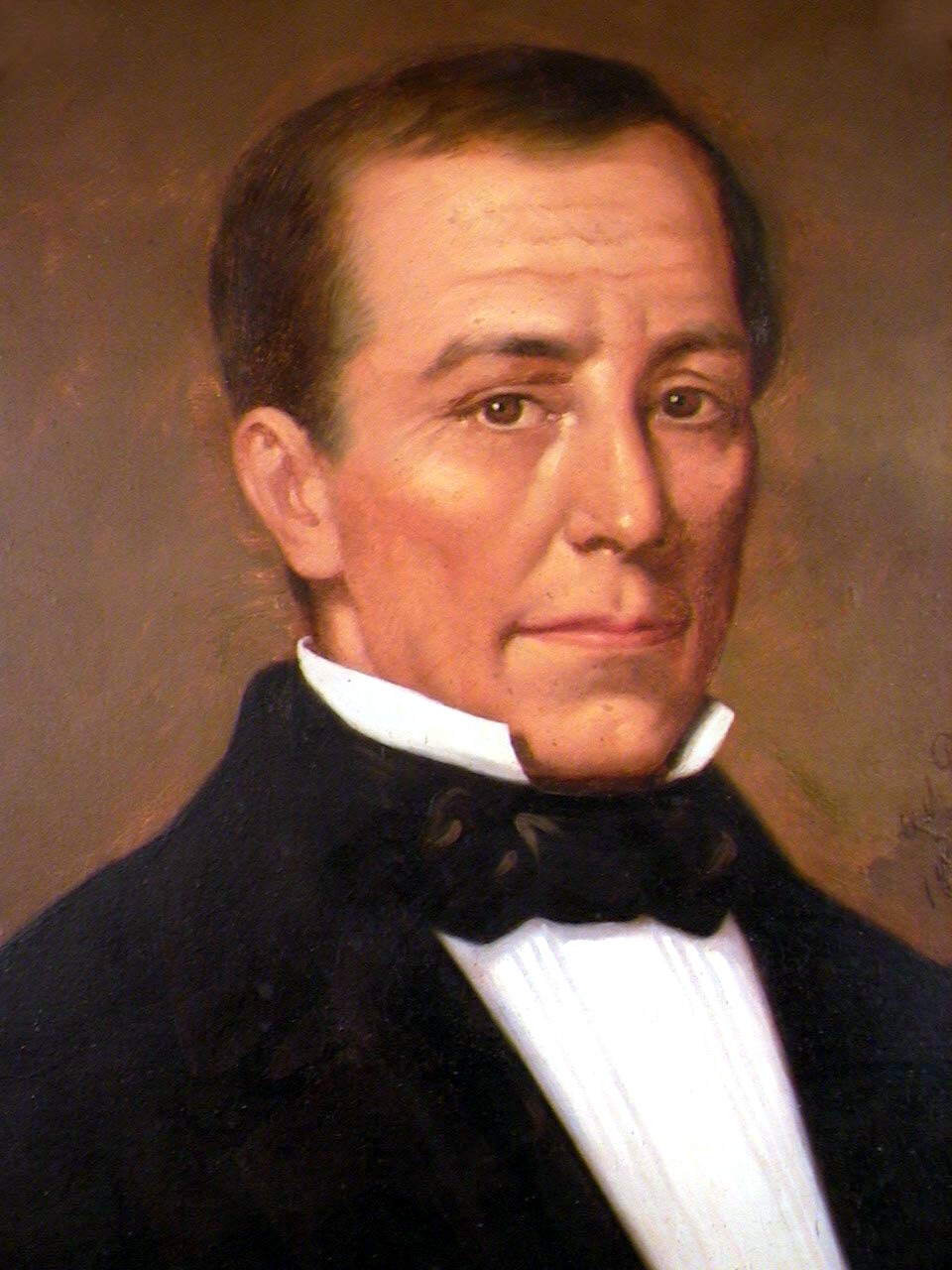
- Portrait by Aquiles Bigot

4th Head of State of Costa Rica
- In office 17 April 1837 – 27 May 1838
- Deputy: Juan Mora Fernández
- Preceded by: Joaquín Mora Fernández (Provisional)
- Succeeded by: Braulio Carrillo Colina

President of the Congress of Costa Rica
- In office March 1836 – June 1836
- Preceded by: Francisco Sáenz Ulloa
- Succeeded by: Manuel Antonio Bonilla Nava
- In office March 1835 – September 1835
- Preceded by: Apolonio Lara Esquivel
- Succeeded by: Manuel Antonio Bonilla Nava
- In office July 1830 – December 1830
- Preceded by: Manuel María de Peralta y López del Corral
- Succeeded by: Rafael Francisco Osejo
- In office March 1829 – April 1829
- Preceded by: Manuel María de Peralta y López del Corral
- Succeeded by: Joaquín Rivas Ramírez
- In office 5 November 1824 – 5 January 1825
- Preceded by: Agustín Gutiérrez Lizaurzabal
- Succeeded by: Manuel Alvarado Hidalgo

Deputy of the Congress of Costa Rica
- In office 1835–1837
- Constituency: San José
- In office 1829–1831
- Constituency: San José
- In office 1824–1825
- Constituency: San José

Personal details
- Born: 12 August 1797 San José, Captaincy General of Guatemala, Spanish Empire
- Died: 7 July 1846 (aged 48) Sonsonate, El Salvador
- Spouse: Inés Cueto y García de la Llana (m. 1824)
- Children: 4
- Education: University of León (LLB)

Manuel Aguilar Chacón (12 August 1797 – 7 July 1846) was a Costa Rican lawyer and politician who served as the 4th Head of State of Costa Rica from April 1837 until he was overthrown in a coup in March 1838.

== Early life ==
He was born in San José, Costa Rica, on August 12, 1797. Was the son of Miguel Antonio Aguilar y Fernández (who ordained as a priest after widowing) and Josefa de la Luz Chacón y Aguilar. He got married in León, Nicaragua, on August 4, 1824 to Inés Cueto y García de la Llana, daughter of Luis de Cueto y Cortés de la Quintana y Teodora García de la Llana. In their home, their four children were born:

1. Mauro Antonio de Jesús (b. 1826), married to Rosa Guzmán y Guzmán, daughter of Juan José Guzmán, President of El Salvador in 1842 and from 1842 to 1844.
2. Juan Manuel (b. 1828), deceased in his early years.
3. Inés Antonia de Jesús (1830-1895), married to Juan Rafael Mora Porras, President of Costa Rica from 1849 to 1859.
4. Manuel Antonio de Jesús (1832-1860), Single.

He obtained his bachelor's degree from the University of León in Nicaragua in 1820 and his Lawyer degree in 1821.

== First public office ==
He became judge of Costa Rica in 1824, member and President of the Constituent Assembly through 1824–1825, General Ministry from 1825 to 1827, School Governing of la Casa de Enseñanza de Santo Tomás in 1826, Representative for San José in 1828, Elected federal Senator in 1828 (he was not able to take office at the time) and Federal Senator through(1832-1833). In 1830 he was elected by the Legislative Assembly as President of the Superior Court of Justice of Costa Rica, but he declined the position.

During 1833, while he was working as Federal Senator in Guatemala, the liberal groups from San José and Alajuela backed up his candidacy as chief of state of Costa Rica. Although he had the highest vote count, he was not able to achieve absolute majority and the Legislative Assembly chose José Rafael de Gallegos y Alvarado.

Manuel Aguilar Chacón returned to Costa Rica on November 21, 1833. And in 1835 he was elected again as Representative for San José to cover the period 1835–1837. He presided the house of Representatives in 1835. In March of that same year, when the elected Chief of State to conclude the period in Gallegos, Nicolás Ulloa Soto, declined the position, the Assembly voted in favor of Aguilar Chacón to assume top command but he refused to admit the electoral process.

== Head of the state ==
With the support of the communities of Alajuela, Cartago and Heredia, Manuel Aguilar Chacón defeated Braulio Carrillo Colina in the 1837 elections and was chosen as Head of State for Costa Rica for the period 1837–1841. As Vice-chief Juan Mora Fernández was elected. Both took office on April 17, 1837 at the city of Heredia, the Capital City of Costa Rica at the time.

During his mandate, the law of 1835 that established the Capital in the City of Murciélago was repealed. He took measures in favour of health and education. He also reorganized the Superior Court of Justice.

He did face great opposition from the supporters of Braulio Carrillo Colina. He even took a serious beating. In March, 1838 he presented his resignation as Chief of State but the Legislative Assembly rejected it.

== Fall and exile ==
Manuel Aguilar Chacón was overthrown on May 27, 1838 by a military coup d'état that rose Braulio Carrillo Colina into power. Aguilar Chacón had to flee in exile. He first was established in the state of El Salvador and later on moved to Guatemala.

== Later activities ==
He was Commissioner of Guatemala in Costa Rica through 1843 and later on he decided to exercise his lawyer profession. In 1845 the Government of Costa Rica designated him as delegate to the "Dieta Unionista Centroamericana" (Centroamerican Union Conference) that was expected to hold a meeting in Sonsonate, El Salvador in 1846. Manuel Aguilar Chacón traveled to Sonsonate, but the union meeting was never inaugurated.

== Death ==
He died in Sonsonate, El Salvador, on July 7, 1846, as a consequence of pneumonia.

== See also ==
- List of presidents of Costa Rica

Political offices
Preceded by Joaquín Mora	Head of State of Costa Rica; 1837-1838	Succeeded by Braulio Carrillo
