= Juan Mora Fernández =

Head of state of Costa Rica from 1824 to 1833

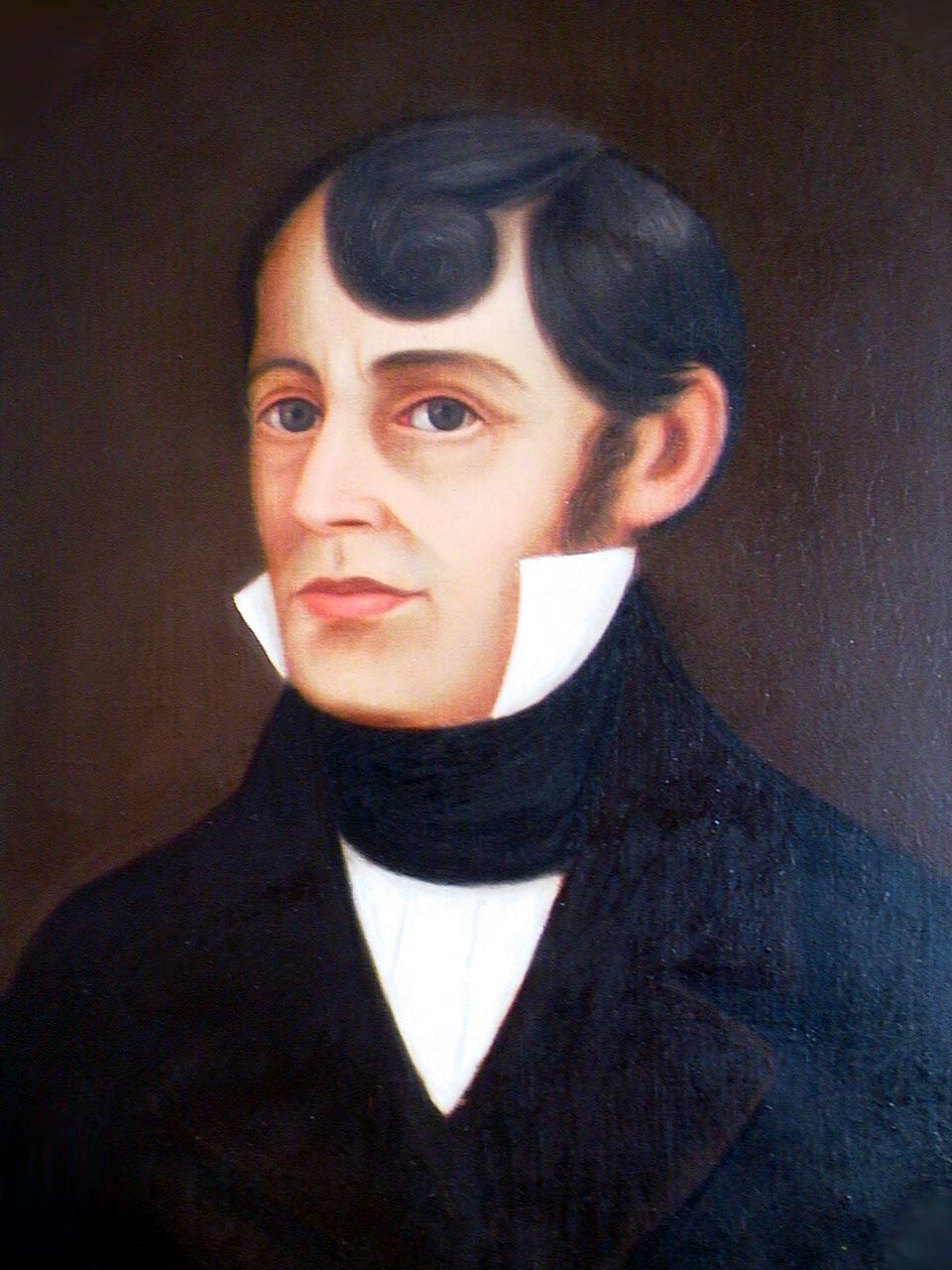
- Portrait by Lorenzo Fortino

15th President of the Supreme Court of Justice
- In office 13 May 1850 – 4 July 1854
- Preceded by: Rafael Ramírez Hidalgo
- Succeeded by: Rafael Ramírez Hidalgo

Vice Head of State of Costa Rica
- In office July 1842 – 11 September 1842
- President: Francisco Morazán
- Preceded by: Manuel Antonio Bonilla Nava
- Succeeded by: Francisco Oreamuno Bonilla
- In office 11 April 1837 – 27 May 1838
- President: Manuel Aguilar Chacón
- Preceded by: Manuel Fernández Chacón
- Succeeded by: Miguel Carranza Fernández

1st Head of State of Costa Rica
- In office 8 September 1824 – 8 March 1833
- Deputy: Mariano Montealegre Bustamante; José Rafael Gallegos
- Preceded by: Position established
- Succeeded by: José Rafael Gallegos

Personal details
- Born: 12 July 1784 San José, Captaincy General of Guatemala, Spanish Empire
- Died: 16 November 1854 (aged 70) San José, Costa Rica
- Party: Independent
- Spouse: Juana Josefa Castillo Palacios (m. 1819)
- Children: 11

Juan Mora Fernández (12 July 1784 – 16 November 1854) was a Costa Rican educator and statesman who served as the 1st Head of State of Costa Rica from 1824 to 1833. He was considered a liberal. Mora was indirectly elected as the first head of state in 1824 (provisional until 1825) and left office at the end of his second term.

He is remembered for instituting land reform, and he followed a progressive course. As a consequence of his land reform structure, he inadvertently created an elite class of powerful coffee barons. Under his tenure he signed the Acta de Indepencia. The barons eventually overthrew one of his later successors, José María Alfaro Zamora.

From 1850 to 1854 he was Magistrate and President of the Supreme Court of Justice of Costa Rica; he died shortly after he resigned. The first printing press arrived in Costa Rica under his tenure.

== Biography ==
Juan Mora Fernàdez was born on July 12, 1788, in San José, Costa Rica, to Mateo Mora Valverde and Lucia Encarnación Fernàndez. He attended his primary school in San José and studied Latin grammar and philosophy in León, Nicaragua. He also became a teacher and a principal in a primary school in Alajuela. He became secretary at the city hall at San José, participated actively for the struggle of independence, joined the Junta Superior Gebernativa between 1821 and 1824. He also became a head of Congress and the Supreme Court of Justice.

Political offices
Preceded by Office established	Head of State of Costa Rica; 1825–1833	Succeeded by José Rafael Gallegos
