= Braulio Carrillo Colina =

Head of State of Costa Rica (1835–1837; 1838–1842)

Braulio Carrillo
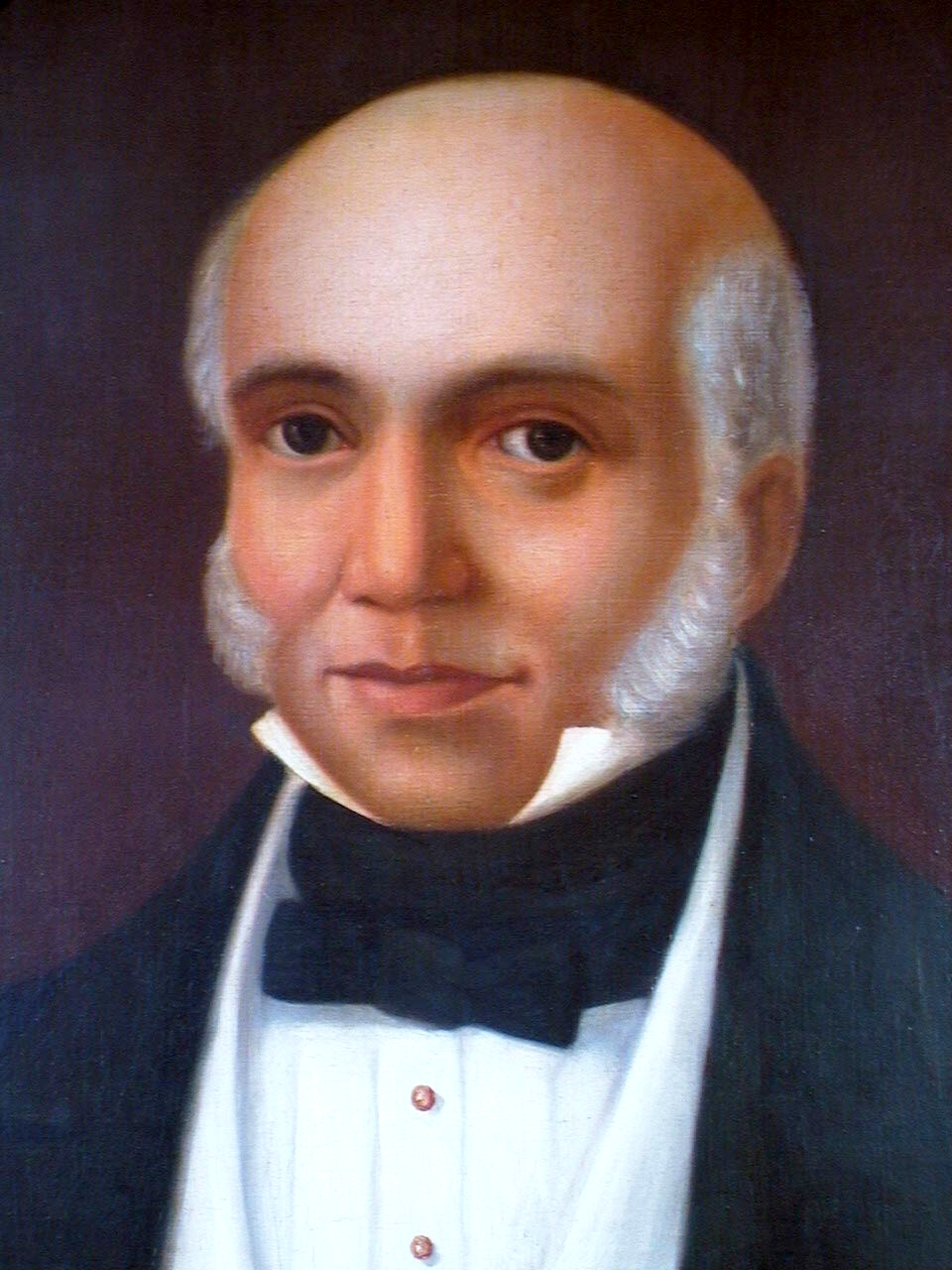
- Portrait by Carlos Sanabria

3rd & 5th Head of State of Costa Rica
- In office 28 May 1838 – 11 April 1842
- Deputy: Miguel Carranza Fernández; Manuel Antonio Bonilla Nava
- Preceded by: Manuel Aguilar Chacón
- Succeeded by: Francisco Morazán
- In office 5 May 1835 – 1 March 1837
- Deputy: Manuel Fernández Chacón
- Preceded by: José Rafael Gallegos
- Succeeded by: Joaquín Mora Fernández

Deputy of the Federal Congress of Central America
- In office 1834–1835
- Constituency: Costa Rica
- In office 1828–1830
- Constituency: Costa Rica

Acting President of the Supreme Court of Justice
- In office 14 October 1833 – 22 January 1834
- Preceded by: Atanasio Gutiérrez y Lizaurzábal
- Succeeded by: José Simeón Guerrero de Arcos y Cervantes

Prosecutor of the Supreme Court of Justice
- In office 14 October 1833 – April 1834
- Preceded by: Matías Sandoval y Porras
- Succeeded by: Atanasio Gutiérrez y Lizaurzábal

President of the Congress of Costa Rica
- In office March 1828 – April 1828
- Preceded by: Pedro Zeledón Mora
- Succeeded by: Manuel Alvarado Hidalgo

Deputy of the Congress of Costa Rica
- In office 1827–1828
- Constituency: San José

Personal details
- Born: Braulio Evaristo Carrillo Colina; 20 March 1800 Cartago, Captaincy General of Guatemala, Spanish Empire
- Died: 15 May 1845 (aged 45) La Sociedad, El Salvador
- Spouse: Froilana Carranza Ramírez (m. 1830)
- Children: 5
- Relatives: Miguel Carranza Fernández (father-in-law); Bruno Carranza Ramírez (brother-in-law)
- Education: University of León (LLB)
- Occupation: Lawyer; politician; merchant; scribe
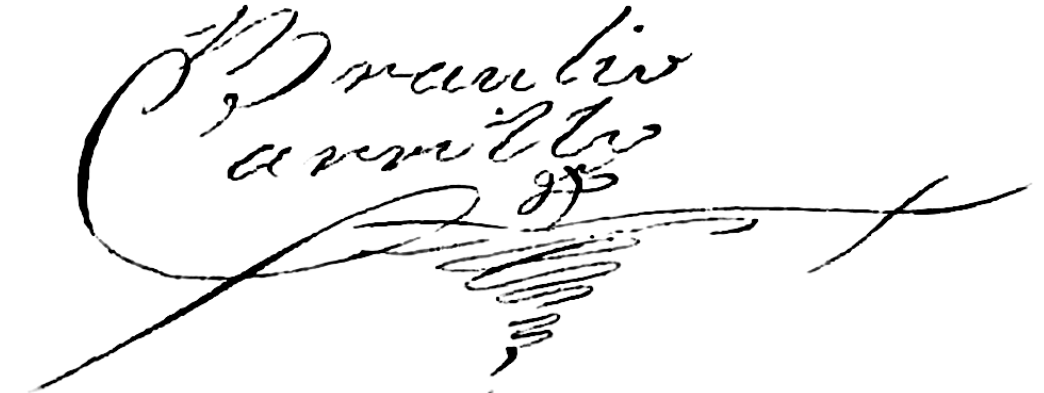
- Signature

Braulio Evaristo Carrillo Colina (20 March 1800 – 15 May 1845) was a Costa Rican lawyer and statesman who served as the 3rd and 5th Head of State of Costa Rica from 1835 to 1837 and as a dictator from 1838 until 1842. His administrations implemented extensive legal, fiscal, administrative, and economic reforms that contributed to the consolidation of the Costa Rican state. Following its secession from the Federal Republic of Central America, Carrillo declared Costa Rica a sovereign and independent state on 14 November 1838.

Before becoming head of state, Carrillo served as a member of the Congress of Costa Rica, a deputy to the Congress of the Federal Republic of Central America, and as a judge and acting president of the Supreme Court of Costa Rica. During his second administration, he reorganized the country's public administration, promoted economic development, codified legislation, and strengthened the authority of the central government. His government also enacted measures against vagrancy and expanded the powers of the executive.

Carrillo has been widely regarded as one of the principal architects of the country's early state institutions and is commonly referred to as the "Architect of the Costa Rican State." The Braulio Carrillo National Park in north-central Costa Rica is named after him.

== Biography ==
Braulio Carrillo studied law at the National Autonomous University of Nicaragua in León, Nicaragua. At the early age of 28 years was elected to the legislature for a period of two years, and for a brief period held the position of president of the legislature. Carrillo held the presidency of the Supreme Court in an acting capacity from October 1833 to January 1834. Later that year, he was sent as a representative of Costa Rica to the Central American Congress, in El Salvador.

Upon the resignation of Costa Rica's head of state José Rafael Gallegos in 1835, Carrillo was indirectly elected to complete the term of Gallegos. Because of their strong character and that the assembly repealed in August of that year the Ambulance Act (the law that established the rotation of the country's capital among the four cities of San José, Alajuela, Heredia and Cartago), the cities of Cartago, Heredia and Alajuela took up arms against the government in mid-September, but were defeated after a civil war which lasted a fortnight.

Carrillo was a candidate for reelection in 1837, but was defeated by Manuel Aguilar, who was overthrown in 1838 by a cuartelazo. Carrillo again became the Head of State, with absolute powers. He convened a constituent assembly, which, in November, declared that the state was separated from the Federal Republic of Central America, and thus Costa Rica became a sovereign country. The constituent session was suspended in December 1838.

In 1841 Carrillo issued the Guarantee Law, which made him head of state for life. There were a number of changes in the social life of Costa Rica, and Carrillo became known as the "Architect of the Costa Rican National State". He worked to prohibit vagrancy, vice and crime. He greatly boost the development of Costa Rica and introduced order in the Civil Service. His efforts to open a path to communicate with the Central Valley Matina on the Caribbean coast, could not be satisfactorily completed, as the government of Francisco Morazán stopped work when they were well advanced. Due to this effort, the National Park located between the provinces of Limón and San José and a highway between San José and Guápiles carries his name today. Braulio Carrillo National Park is also named after him.

In 1842 Francisco Morazán, former Federal President Central America, invaded Costa Rica and seized power. Carrillo went into exile and settled in El Salvador, where he was killed in 1845.

== Achievements of Carrillo's governments ==
- Abolished Ambulance Act and established the capital in San Juan del Murciélago, now Tibás.
- Reduced the number of public holidays in 1836.
- Enacted the General Code of the State of Costa Rica in 1841.
- Developed a plan to boost agriculture.
- Costa Rica left the Central American Federation and assumed full sovereignty.
- He organized new Courts of Justice.

Political offices
Preceded by José Rafael Gallegos	Head of State of Costa Rica; 1835–1837	Succeeded by Joaquín Mora
Preceded by Manuel Aguilar	Head of State of Costa Rica; 1838-1842	Succeeded by Francisco Morazán
