= List of presidents of Costa Rica =

The following article lists the presidents and heads of state of Costa Rica since Central American independence from Spain. From 1824 to 1838 Costa Rica was a state within the Federal Republic of Central America; since then it has been an independent nation.

== Heads of state of Costa Rica (1824–1848) ==
Liberal Conservative

No.	Head of State	Portrait	Term of office	Political affiliation	Notes
1	Juan Mora Fernández (1784–1854)		1824–1833	Liberal	Two consecutive terms; re-elected in 1829.
2	José Rafael Gallegos (1784–1850)		1833–1835	Conservative	Resigned, Manuel Fernández Chacón and Nicolás Ulloa Soto followed as acting Heads of State.
3	Braulio Carrillo Colina (1800–1845)		1835–1837	Liberal	First term.
4	Juan Mora Fernández (1784–1854)		March–April 1837	Liberal	Provisional.
5	Manuel Aguilar Chacón (1797–1846)		1837–1838	Liberal	Deposed in a coup d'état.
6	Braulio Carrillo Colina (1800–1845)		1838–1842	Liberal	Second term. Deposed in a coup d'état.
7	Francisco Morazán (1792–1842)		April–September 1842	Liberal	Deposed by popular uprising; executed on 15 September 1842.
8	António Pinto Soares (1780–1865)		September 1842	Liberal	Came to power in popular uprising, and quickly resigned.
9	José María Alfaro Zamora (1799–1865)		1842–1844	Liberal	First term. Provisional.
10	Francisco María Oreamuno Bonilla (1801–1856)		November–December 1844	Liberal	Deposed in a coup d'état.
11	José Rafael Gallegos (1784–1850)		1845–1846	Conservative	
12	José María Alfaro Zamora (1799–1856)		1846–1847	Liberal	Second term.
13	José Castro Madriz (1818–1892)		1847–1848	Liberal	

== Presidents of Costa Rica (1848–present) ==
Liberal Conservative Military PP PR PRN PUN PLN PUSC PAC PPSD PPSO

No.	President (Birth–Death)	Term of office		Political affiliation	Election	Notes
1	José María Castro Madriz (1818–1892)	31 August 1848	16 November 1849	Non-partisan Liberal	1847	"Founder of the Republic".
–	Miguel Mora Porras (1816–1887)	16 November 1849	26 November 1849	Non-partisan Liberal		Interim president.
2	Juan Mora Porras (1814–1860)	26 November 1849	14 August 1859	Non-partisan Liberal	1849; 1853; 1859	First, second and third term.
3	José María Montealegre Fernández (1815–1887)	14 August 1859	8 May 1863	Non-partisan Liberal	1860	Provisional 1859–1860.
4	Jesús Jiménez Zamora (1823–1897)	8 May 1863	8 May 1866	Non-partisan Liberal	1863	
5	José Castro Madriz (1818–1892)	8 May 1866	1 November 1868	Non-partisan Liberal	1866	Second term. Deposed in a coup d'état.
6	Jesús Jiménez Zamora (1823–1897)	1 November 1868	27 April 1870	Military	De facto	Second term.
7	Bruno Carranza Ramírez (1822–1891)	27 April 1870	8 August 1870	Non-partisan Liberal		Appointed by Tomás Guardia as provisional president. Resigned after a few months.
8	Tomás Guardia Gutiérrez (1831–1882)	10 August 1870	8 May 1876	Non-partisan Liberal	1872	Provisional 1870–1872, latter elected.
9	Aniceto Esquivel Sáenz (1824–1898)	8 May 1876	30 July 1876	Non-partisan Liberal	1876	Deposed in a coup d'état.
10	Vicente Herrera Zeledón (1821–1888)	30 July 1876	11 September 1877	Non-partisan Conservative		Appointed by Guardia.
11	Tomás Guardia Gutiérrez (1831–1882)	11 September 1877	6 July 1882	Non-partisan Liberal		Second term as de facto ruler. Died in office.
12	Saturnino Lizano Gutiérrez (1826–1905)	6 July 1882	20 July 1882	Non-partisan Liberal		Acting president.
13	Próspero Fernández Oreamuno (1834–1885)	20 July 1882	12 March 1885	Non-partisan Liberal	1882	Died in office.
14	Bernardo Soto Alfaro (1854–1931)	12 March 1885	8 May 1890	Non-partisan Liberal	1886	Two consecutive terms, the first incomplete. Carlos Durán Cartín was acting president 1889–1890.
15	José Rodríguez Zeledón (1837–1917)	8 May 1890	8 May 1894	Constitutional Democratic	1889	
16	Rafael Yglesias Castro (1861–1924)	8 May 1894	8 May 1902	Civil	1894; 1897	First and second term.
17	Ascensión Esquivel Ibarra (1844–1923)	8 May 1902	8 May 1906	National Union	1902	
18	Cleto González Víquez (1858–1937)	8 May 1906	8 May 1910	National	1906	First term.
19	Ricardo Jiménez Oreamuno (1859–1945)	8 May 1910	8 May 1914	Republican	1910	First term. Son of Jesús Jiménez Zamora.
20	Alfredo González Flores (1877–1962)	8 May 1914	27 January 1917	Republican	Designated by Congress as no clear candidate won in 1913	De facto Deposed by Tinoco in a coup d'état.
21	Federico Tinoco Granados (1868–1931)	27 January 1917	13 August 1919	Peliquista	Took power after coup, was sole candidate in the 1917 election	First and second term. Overthrown by popular uprising.
22	Juan Quirós Segura (1853–1934)	13 August 1919	2 September 1919	Peliquista	De facto	Previously Vice President. Replaced Tinoco after his escape. Forced to resign by the U.S. government.
23	Francisco Aguilar Barquero (1857–1924)	2 September 1919	8 May 1920	Republican		Interim president.
24	Julio Acosta García (1872–1954)	8 May 1920	8 May 1924	Constitutional	1919	
25	Ricardo Jiménez Oreamuno (1859–1945)	8 May 1924	8 May 1928	Republican	1923	Second term.
26	Cleto González Víquez (1858–1937)	8 May 1928	8 May 1932	National Union	1928	Second term.
27	Ricardo Jiménez Oreamuno (1859–1945)	8 May 1932	8 May 1936	National Republican	1932	Third term.
28	León Cortés Castro (1882–1946)	8 May 1936	8 May 1940	National Republican	1936	
29	Rafael Calderón Guardia (1900–1970)	8 May 1940	8 May 1944	National Republican	1940	
30	Teodoro Picado Michalski (1900–1960)	8 May 1944	20 April 1948	National Republican	1944	
–	Santos León Herrera (1874–1950)	20 April 1948	8 May 1948	National Republican		Interim president. Former vice-president of Teodoro Picado Michalski.
–	José Figueres Ferrer (1906–1990)	8 May 1948	8 November 1949	Social Democratic	De facto	Came to power in the Civil War. Returned power to elected president after re-organizing the government.
31	Otilio Ulate Blanco (1891–1973)	8 November 1949	8 November 1953	National Union	1948	
32	José Figueres Ferrer (1906–1990)	8 November 1953	8 May 1958	National Liberation	1953	Second term. Presidential re-election disallowed.
33	Mario Echandi Jiménez (1915–2011)	8 May 1958	8 May 1962	National Union	1958	
34	Francisco Orlich Bolmarcich (1907–1969)	8 May 1962	8 May 1966	National Liberation	1962	
35	José Trejos Fernández (1916–2010)	8 May 1966	8 May 1970	National Unification	1966	
36	José Figueres Ferrer (1906–1990)	8 May 1970	8 May 1974	National Liberation	1970	Third term. Presidential re-election disallowed.
37	Daniel Oduber Quirós (1921–1991)	8 May 1974	8 May 1978	National Liberation	1974	
38	Rodrigo Carazo Odio (1926–2009)	8 May 1978	8 May 1982	Unity Coalition	1978	
39	Luis Monge Álvarez (1925–2016)	8 May 1982	8 May 1986	National Liberation	1982	
40	Óscar Arias Sánchez (born 1940)	8 May 1986	8 May 1990	National Liberation	1986	Nobel Peace Prize winner (1987). First term.
41	Rafael Calderón Fournier (born 1949)	8 May 1990	8 May 1994	Social Christian Unity	1990	Son of Rafael Ángel Calderón Guardia.
42	José Figueres Olsen (born 1954)	8 May 1994	8 May 1998	National Liberation	1994	Son of José Figueres Ferrer.
43	Miguel Rodríguez Echeverría (born 1940)	8 May 1998	8 May 2002	Social Christian Unity	1998	
44	Abel Pacheco de la Espriella (born 1933)	8 May 2002	8 May 2006	Social Christian Unity	2002	Presidential re-election re-instated.
45	Óscar Arias Sánchez (born 1940)	8 May 2006	8 May 2010	National Liberation	2006	Second term.
46	Laura Chinchilla Miranda (born 1959)	8 May 2010	8 May 2014	National Liberation	2010	First female president of Costa Rica.
47	Luis Guillermo Solís Rivera (born 1958)	8 May 2014	8 May 2018	Citizens' Action	2014	
48	Carlos Alvarado Quesada (born 1980)	8 May 2018	8 May 2022	Citizens' Action	2018	Youngest president since Alfredo González Flores (1914). First president to be called by Congress for hearing.
49	Rodrigo Chaves Robles (born 1961)	8 May 2022	8 May 2026	Social Democratic Progress	2022	
50	Laura Fernández Delgado (born 1986)	8 May 2026	Incumbent (Term ends on 8 May 2030)	Sovereign People's	2026	Second female president of Costa Rica.

== See also ==
- List of presidents of the Legislative Assembly of Costa Rica
- List of presidents of the Supreme Court of Costa Rica
