= León Cortés Castro =

President of Costa Rica from 1936 to 1940

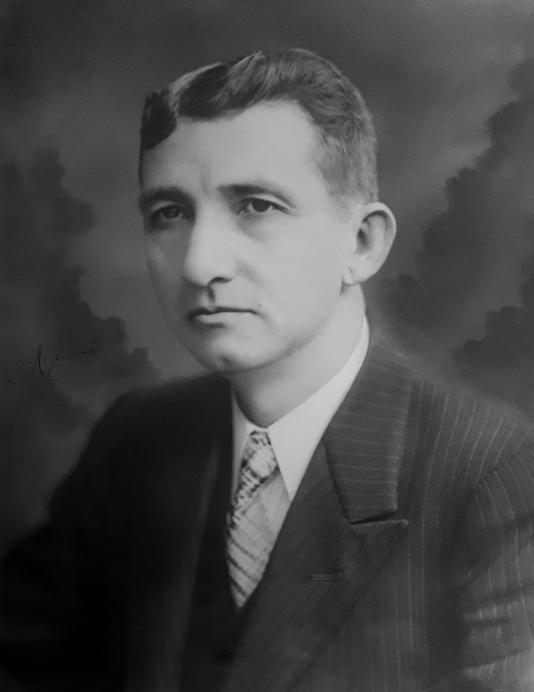
- Portrait c. 1936

28th President of Costa Rica
- In office 8 May 1936 – 8 May 1940
- Preceded by: Ricardo Jiménez Oreamuno
- Succeeded by: Rafael Ángel Calderón Guardia

Third Designate to the Presidency
- In office 8 May 1932 – 8 May 1936
- President: Ricardo Jiménez Oreamuno
- Preceded by: Andrés Venegas García
- Succeeded by: Rafael Ángel Calderón Guardia

Secretary of Public Works and Agriculture
- In office 8 May 1932 – 22 April 1935
- President: Ricardo Jiménez Oreamuno
- Preceded by: Francisco Mayorga Rivas
- Succeeded by: Ricardo Pacheco Lara
- In office 22 May 1930 – 12 November 1930
- President: Cleto González Víquez
- Preceded by: Arturo Volio Jiménez
- Succeeded by: Gregorio Escalante Echandi

Secretary of Public Education
- In office 7 November 1929 – 22 May 1930
- President: Cleto González Víquez
- Preceded by: Luis Dobles Segreda
- Succeeded by: Ricardo Fournier Quirós

President of the Constitutional Congress
- In office 1 May 1925 – 30 April 1926
- Preceded by: Arturo Volio Jiménez
- Succeeded by: Arturo Volio Jiménez

Deputy of the Constitutional Congress
- In office 1 May 1922 – 6 November 1929
- Constituency: Alajuela Province
- In office 1 May 1914 – 27 January 1917
- Constituency: Alajuela Province

Governor of Alajuela
- In office 22 March 1917 – 16 May 1917
- President: Federico Tinoco Granados
- Preceded by: Alberto Calvo Fernández
- Succeeded by: Juan Rafael Saborío

Director of the National Archives
- In office 31 July 1911 – 28 April 1914
- President: Ricardo Jiménez Oreamuno
- Preceded by: Rafael Villegas Arango
- Succeeded by: Ezequiel Gutiérrez Iglesias

Personal details
- Born: 8 December 1882 Alajuela, Costa Rica
- Died: 3 March 1946 (aged 63) Santa Ana, Costa Rica
- Party: Democratic Party (1942–1946)
- Other political affiliations: National Republican Party (1931–1942); Republican Party
- Spouse: Julia Fernández Rodríguez (m. 1905)
- Children: 3
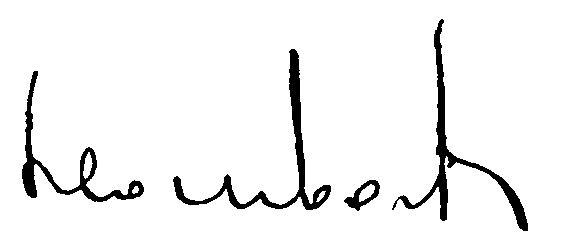
- Signature

León Cortés Castro (8 December 1882 – 3 March 1946) was a Costa Rican educator, lawyer and politician who served as the 28th President of Costa Rica from 1936 to 1940. His presidency was marked by an extensive public works program, including the construction of numerous public schools and the former La Sabana International Airport, leading contemporaries to refer to his government as the gobierno del cemento y la varilla (“cement and steel administration”).

Cortés was the last in a succession of liberal presidents prior to the political and social reforms associated with Calderonism in the 1940s. During his term, he considered constitutional changes that would have permitted his immediate re-election but ultimately did not pursue them due to the constitutional prohibition on consecutive presidential terms. He was succeeded by Rafael Ángel Calderón Guardia, whose administration expanded the role of the state through a series of social reforms.

Cortés’s views on European politics and fascism have been the subject of historical debate. He expressed admiration for certain aspects of Nazi Germany’s economic policies. During his presidency, he appointed engineer Max Effinger Graf, head of the Costa Rican branch of the Nazi Party/Foreign Organization, as director of immigration. In that role, Effinger implemented restrictive immigration policies that limited the entry of individuals classified as “non-Aryan,” including Polish Jewish refugees seeking asylum in Costa Rica. Effinger had previously worked under Cortés as a paid consultant between 1932 and 1933.

== Early life and education ==
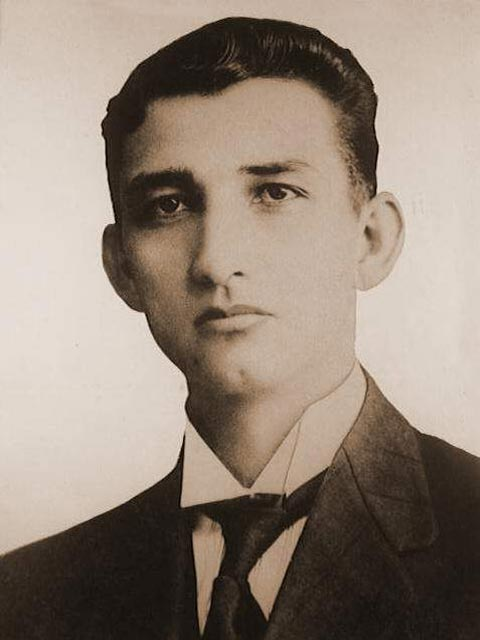
Photograph of Cortés during his parliamentary career, between 1924 and 1928.

León Cortés Castro was born on 8 December 1882 in Alajuela, Costa Rica, to Colombian physician Roberto Cortés Cortés and Fidelina Castro Ruiz. He completed his primary education in Alajuela and his secondary studies at the Liceo de Costa Rica. After completing his formal education, he qualified as a teacher and initially worked in both primary and secondary education.

On 28 September 1905, Cortés married Julia Fernández Rodríguez, a primary school teacher from Alajuela. The couple had three sons: Javier, Jorge, and Otto Cortés Fernández.

From 1911 to 1914, Cortés served as director of the National Archives. He resigned from the post in order to assume the parliamentary seat to which he had been elected.

== Early political career ==
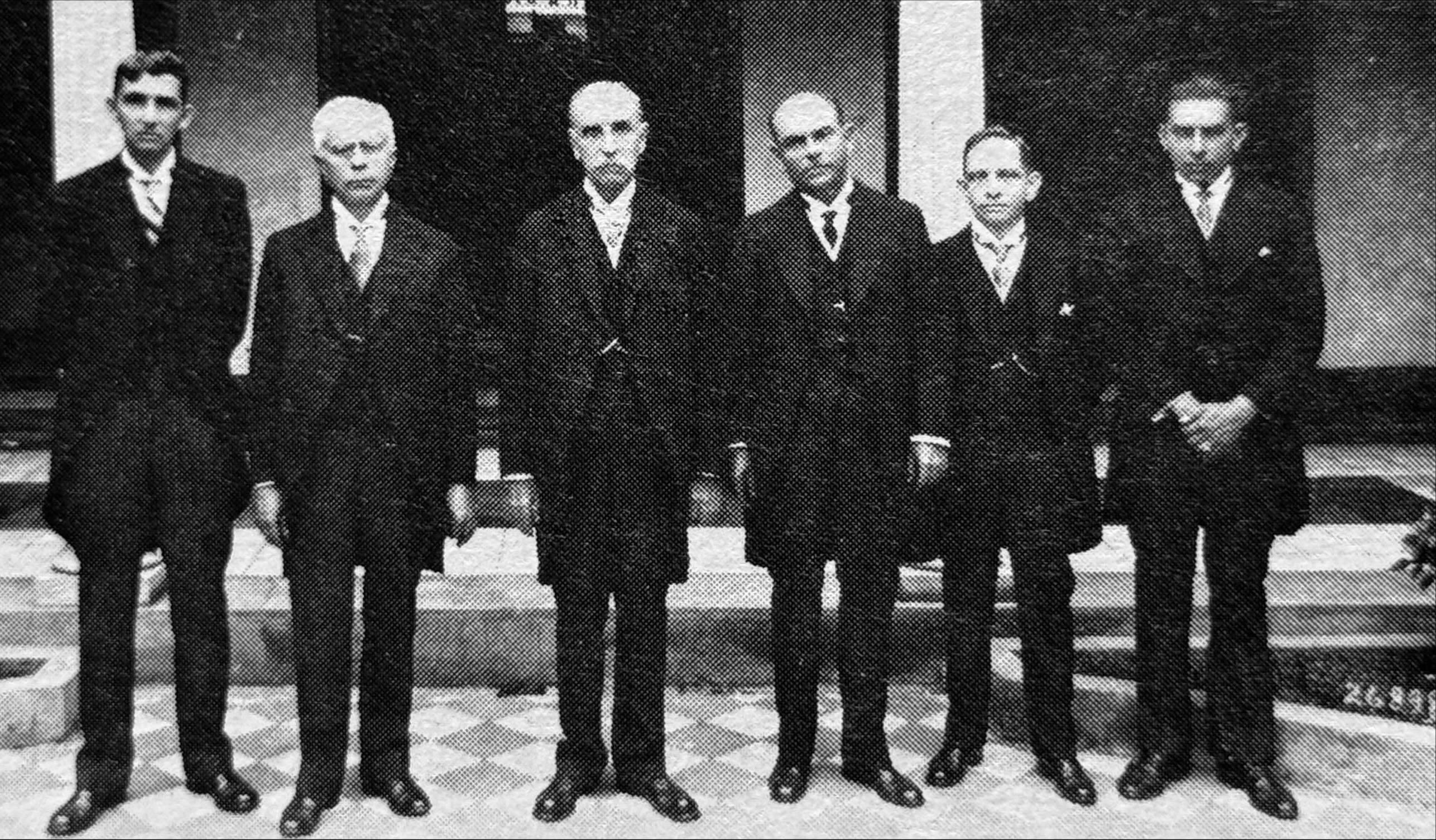
Cortés (first from left to right) standing alongside the cabinet of the Third Jiménez Administration.

Cortés was first elected to the Constitutional Congress in the 1913 general election as a representative for Alajuela from the Republican Party. In August 1916, he earned a law degree from the Escuela de Derecho in San José. His initial parliamentary term was interrupted by the 1917 coup d’état led by General Federico Tinoco Granados.

During the Tinoco dictatorship, Cortés was appointed governor of Alajuela on March 1917. On 16 May, Cortés was appointed as Delegate from Costa Rica to the Oficina Internacional Centroamericana ("Central American International Office"), predecessor to SICA, and Chargé d'affaires to Guatemala. He served until his resignation on 2 September 1918.

Following the fall of the Tinoco regime and the establishment of a transitional government under Francisco Aguilar Barquero, Cortés was appointed a trial court judge in Cartago, serving from 1919 to 1920. He returned to legislative politics in the 1921 midterm elections with the reconstituted Republican Party led by Ricardo Jiménez Oreamuno. Cortés was elected President of the Constitutional Congress for the 1925–1926 legislative year and was re-elected as a deputy in 1925 for the 1926–1930 term as a Republican.

In 1929, Cortés resigned from Congress to serve as Secretary of Education under President Cleto González Víquez of the National Union Party, holding the position from 1929 to 1930. He was later reassigned to the Secretariat of Public Works and Agriculture, which he led from May to November 1930, when he was replaced by González.

Following the internal split of the Republican Party and the formation of the National Republican Party (PRN), which won the 1932 election, Cortés was re-appointed Secretary of Public Works and Agriculture, serving from 1932 until his resignation in April 1935, under President Ricardo Jiménez. During this period, he was also elected by Congress as Third Designate to the Presidency.

== Presidency (1936–1940) ==
Cortés was selected as the presidential candidate of the PRN to succeed Jiménez Oreamuno in the 1936 general election. He defeated Octavio Béeche Argüello, a judge and candidate of the National Party, and Carlos Luis Sáenz of the communist Bloc of Workers and Farmers. Cortés won the election with 60.2% of the vote and carried all provinces. The PRN also retained a majority in the Constitutional Congress.

During the campaign, Cortés faced accusations from opponents of authoritarian and fascist tendencies. He positioned himself as a staunch anti-communist and presented his candidacy as a safeguard against the spread of communist ideology in Costa Rica. By this period, his political platform and governing outlook were commonly referred to as Cortesismo.

Public works constituted a central focus of Cortés’s administration and are among its most visible legacies. His government oversaw the construction of numerous roads and public schools throughout the country, significantly expanding infrastructure in both urban and rural areas.

The administration commissioned technical studies of Costa Rica’s monetary and educational systems. Experts were sent to Chile for training, and foreign specialists were invited to conduct formal assessments: the monetary audit was led by Dr. Hermann Max, while the educational review was directed by Luis Galdámez. As part of the monetary reforms, Cortés transformed the Banco Internacional de Costa Rica—originally established in 1914 under President Alfredo González Flores—into the Banco Nacional de Costa Rica. The reform expanded the institution’s role as a state-controlled development bank and consolidated monetary issuance under a centralized framework, replacing the previous system of multiple private bank issuers.

The educational study recommended the reestablishment of a public university, following the closure of the University of Santo Tomás in 1888. Although the proposal was not implemented during Cortés’s administration, it later informed higher education reforms undertaken by the subsequent government, leading to the creation of the University of Costa Rica in 1940.

Cortés also signed the Cortés–Chittenden banana contract, which facilitated the expansion of banana production in the South Pacific region and led to the construction of the ports of Quepos and Golfito. During his presidency, the main customs house in Puntarenas was also built.

== Post-presidency ==
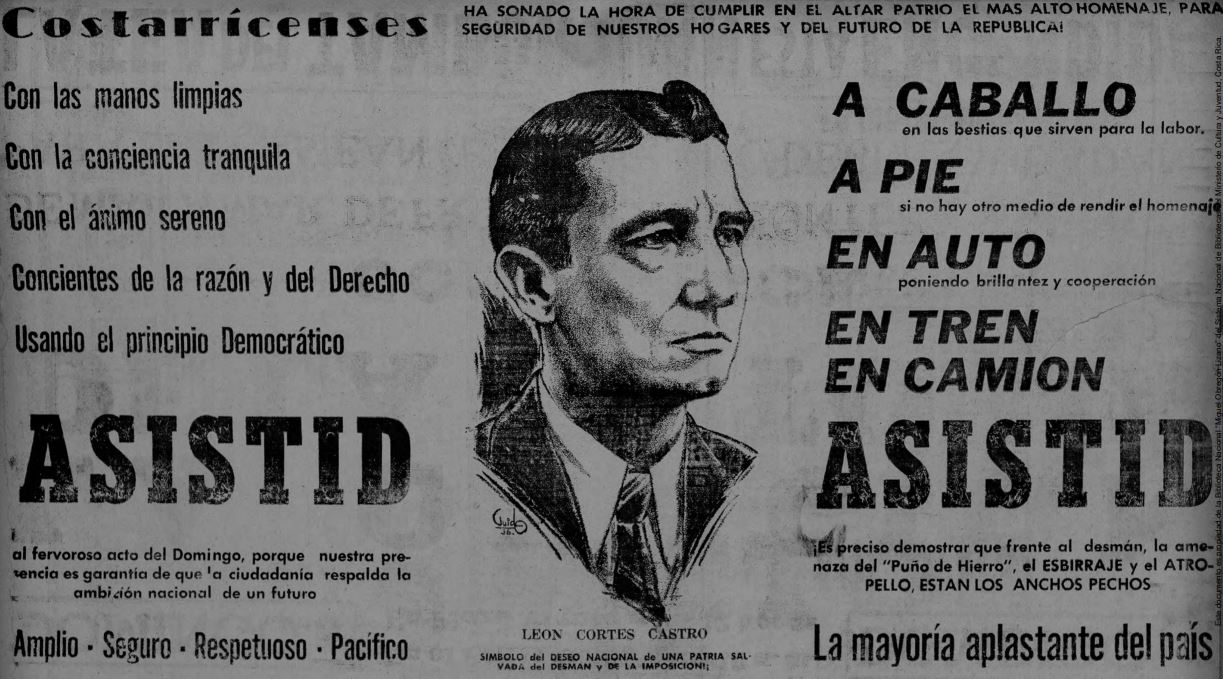
Newspaper invitation to attend a campaign speech by Cortés on 6 February 1944.

After leaving office, Cortés remained active in public and political life. Although he was initially supportive of Rafael Ángel Calderón Guardia as a fellow leader within the National Republican Party, Cortés became a political opponent of Calderón by the second year of Calderón’s administration. In 1943, Cortés left the PRN and founded the Democratic Party, attracting supporters commonly identified as cortesistas.

The Democratic Party contested the 1942 legislative elections under two different party labels, securing 4 of the 22 seats up for election and obtaining a combined total of approximately 18,000 votes, representing about 17% of the vote nationwide. Cortés himself did not seek a seat but was widely regarded as leading the opposition from outside Congress. He strongly opposed the Bloque de la Victoria (“Victory Bloc”), an electoral alliance formed between the PRN under Calderón, the People's Vanguard Party (PVP) led by Manuel Mora Valverde, and sectors of the Catholic Church under Archbishop Víctor Manuel Sanabria Martínez.

When the PRN nominated Teodoro Picado Michalski—a close associate of Calderón and former president of the Congress—as its candidate in the 1944 general election, Cortés launched his own presidential candidacy. As in his earlier campaigns, he faced accusations from opponents of fascist sympathies. His candidacy received support from conservative political groups, segments of the business elite, and conservative Catholic factions. Cortés was defeated by Picado, receiving 33.9% of the vote and carrying only the provinces of Alajuela and Heredia. Nevertheless, the Democratic Party expanded its representation in the Constitutional Congress, winning 14 of the 45 seats and thereby preventing the governing alliance from attaining a two-thirds supermajority.

During the Picado administration, Cortés continued to serve as the principal leader of the opposition. The Democratic Party participated in the 1946 legislative elections, maintaining its existing level of representation. Cortés was widely expected to contest the 1948 general election, potentially facing Calderón Guardia once again. However, he died unexpectedly on 3 March 1946, one month after the legislative elections, leaving a leadership vacuum within the opposition. By that time, political tensions had intensified amid accusations of electoral fraud, conflicts with sectors of the economic elite, and the growing prominence of figures such as José Figueres Ferrer, developments that would culminate in the Costa Rican Civil War of 1948.

== Legacy ==
Several public institutions and places in Costa Rica are named after León Cortés Castro. In San José Province, the canton of León Cortés Castro was established on 29 March 1962 following its separation from Tarrazú. In the Guácima district of Alajuela, a public primary school bears his name; the school was constructed during his administration, replacing the former Casa de Enseñanza El Coco founded in 1893. Another school in Cot, Oreamuno, Cartago Province—originally established in 1886—was significantly expanded during Cortés’s presidency and subsequently named in his honor.

León Cortés Castro was declared a Benemérito de la Patria on 26 January 1949 by the Founding Junta of the Second Republic.

Political offices
Preceded by Ricardo Jiménez Oreamuno	President of Costa Rica; 1936–1940	Succeeded by Rafael Ángel Calderón Guardia
