= 1932 Costa Rican general election =

- 14 February 1932
- Presidential election
- Registered: 118,186
- Turnout: 64.22% (▲1.75pp)
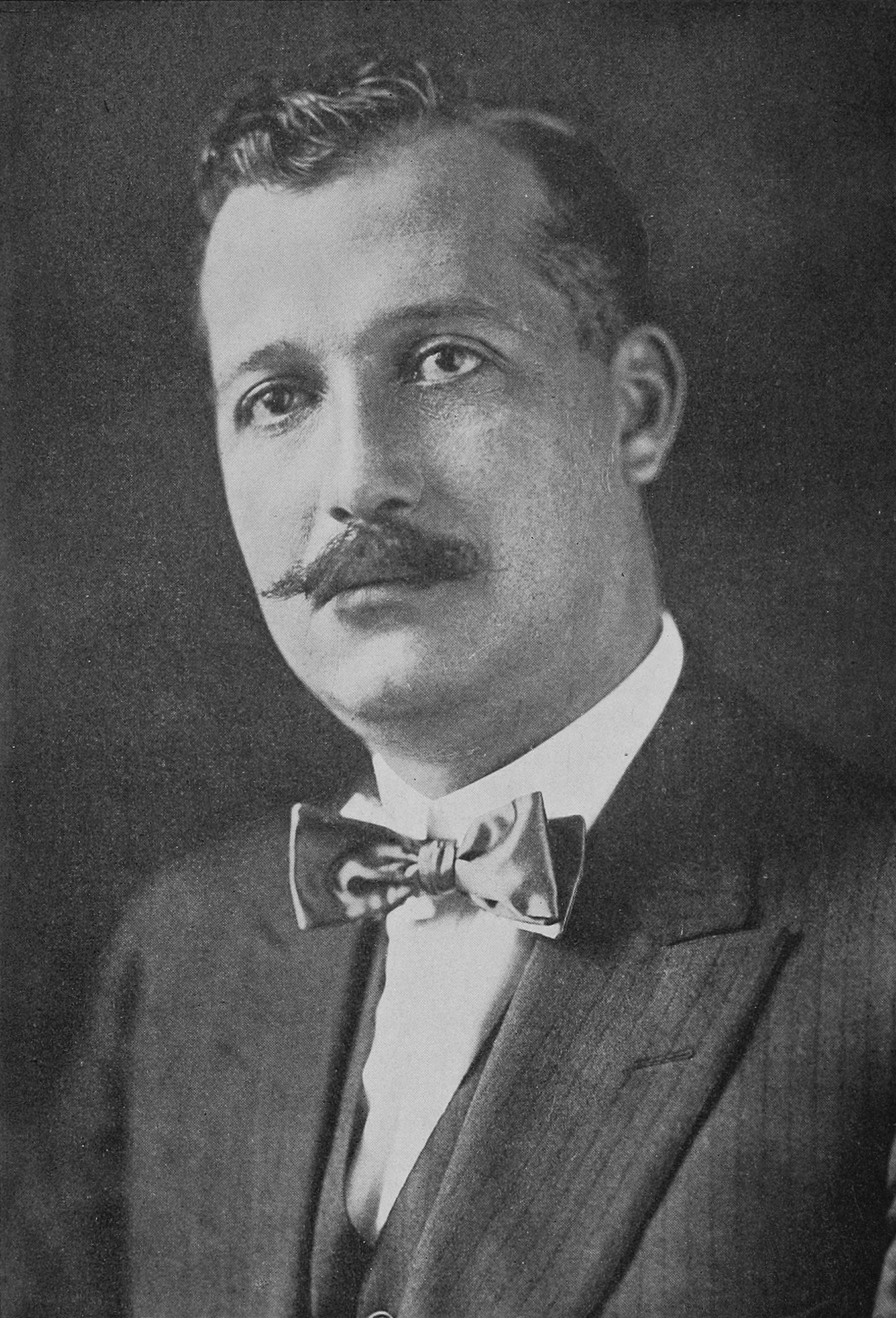

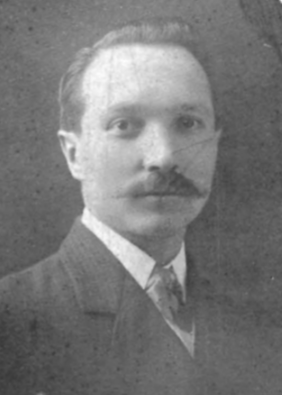
Nominee	Ricardo Jiménez Oreamuno	Manuel Castro Quesada	Carlos María Jiménez Ortiz
Party	PRN	Republican Union	Republican
Popular vote	35,408	22,077	17,316
Percentage	46.65%	29.09%	22.82%
Congress vote	22	Resigned	Disqualified
- Official results by province
President before election
Cleto González Víquez
PUN
Elected President
Ricardo Jiménez Oreamuno
PRN
- Legislative election
- 22 of the 43 seats in the Constitutional Congress
- Turnout: 64.16% (▲33.45pp)
Party	Leader	Vote %	Seats	+/–
PRN	Ricardo Jiménez Oreamuno	46.68	14	New
UR	Manuel Castro Quesada	29.06	6	New
Republican	Carlos María Jiménez Ortiz	22.82	2	−3
This lists parties that won seats. See the complete results below.
Results by province

General elections were held in Costa Rica on 14 February 1932 to elect a president and half of the Constitutional Congress. Former president Ricardo Jiménez Oreamuno of the National Republican Party won a plurality of the presidential vote with 46.7%, ahead of Manuel Castro Quesada of the Republican Union, but failed to obtain the absolute majority required for election under the Constitution.

Article 78, paragraph 2 of the Constitution required a second election between the two leading candidates if no candidate obtained an absolute majority. However, following the Bellavistazo uprising in the aftermath of the elections, Castro withdrew his candidacy before Congress could authorize a runoff. On 1 March 1932, the Congress accepted his withdrawal and, rather than call a new election, appointed Jiménez as First Designate, enabling him to assume the presidency for the 1932–1936 term.

On 8 March, outgoing President Cleto González Víquez publicly questioned the constitutionality of Congress's decision. He argued that Article 78 unequivocally required a second election whenever no candidate obtained an absolute majority, regardless of whether one of the qualifying candidates had withdrawn. González maintained that the 1926 constitutional reform had been enacted specifically to prevent Congress from choosing the president, as it had done in 1913, by requiring a runoff between the two candidates who had received the most votes.

The election also marked the beginning of four consecutive presidential victories for the National Republican Party between 1932 and 1944. It was the first national election following the split of the historic Republican Party, from which the party never reunited. Voter turnout was 64%.

== Campaign ==
In 1931, Ricardo Jiménez Oreamuno was proclaimed in absentia as the presidential nominee at the convention of the newly created National Republican Party. During the proceedings, an incident occurred in which four individuals reportedly shouted "Long live the Communist Party!", the circumstances and significance of which remain unclear.

Upon being informed of his nomination, Jiménez stated that he would consider accepting the candidacy. Having largely withdrawn from political life to his farm, he expressed reluctance to return to public office and declared that he would only accept if he received sufficient popular and financial support. At the time of the election, Jiménez would be 73 years old and running for a non-consecutive third term in the presidency.

The various Republican factions, each claiming to be heirs of the historic Republican Party founded by the late Máximo Fernández, remained divided in their search for candidates. Alberto Echandi Montero of the former Agricultural Party and León Cortés Castro of the Republican were both mentioned as potential contenders but ultimately declined to run.

Meanwhile, Manuel Castro Quesada, who had served as Costa Rica’s Minister to the United States since 1928, requested a leave of absence from his diplomatic post and returned to the country with political ambitions. His return provoked a political crisis within the cabinet of incumbent president Cleto González Víquez. A majority of cabinet members voted in favor of dismissing Castro, opposed only by Secretary of Public Security Arturo Quirós Carranza, González’s son-in-law. The dispute became public, leading to the resignation of the ministers who had supported Castro’s removal, including Tomás Soley Güell, Gregorio Escalante Echandi, and Octavio Béeche Argüello. Rumors circulated that President González himself might resign, but ultimately remained in office.

León Cortés Castro, who had served as a cabinet secretary under President Cleto González Víquez from 1929 to 1930 and was now aligned with the opposition, issued strong accusations against the government and against Castro Quesada, whom he described as a political instrument of the administration. Castro responded publicly, stating:

"May Mr. Cortés calm down his circus lion frenzy; let him continue to be the humorous note of the campaign and walk with his undulating cloak from town to town."

In the aftermath of the political scandal and the ensuing ministerial crisis, Jiménez Oreamuno announced his withdrawal from the presidential race, prompting the emergence of new potential candidates. The Agricultural, Republican, and Constitutional parties offered their joint nomination to Carlos María Jiménez Ortiz, runner-up in the 1928 election, who initially declined the proposal.

Castro Quesada was subsequently nominated as the presidential candidate of the new Republican Union Party. His candidacy received support from former president Alfredo González Flores, under whom Castro had previously served as secretary of state, as well as from banking and landowning sectors—including Fernando Castro Cervantes—intellectual circles, and remnants of Jorge Volio Jiménez’s Reformist Party.

Jiménez Oreamuno ultimately accepted the National Republican Party’s nomination on 16 July 1931, following negotiations with Alberto Echandi Montero and León Cortés Castro, both formerly his political adversaries. His decision sparked spontaneous public celebrations in the city of Cartago.

In addition, the newly formed Nationalist Party, led by businessman of German descent Max Koberg Bolandi, participated in the election. The Communist Party, which had been established in June of that year, was denied the right to participate by the government.

The campaign was marked by recurring accusations related to the conduct of political leaders during the 1917 coup d'état. Jiménez Oreamuno was criticized by opponents for allegedly failing to oppose the Tinoco regime decisively, while he in turn accused Manuel Castro Quesada and his ally Alfredo González Flores (who had been president when overthrown by Federico Tinoco) of having sought intervention by the United States in the aftermath of the coup.

Jorge Volio Jiménez advocated restoring public voting, which had been abolished in 1925 and replaced by the secret ballot, a proposal that many liberal sectors considered a regression in democratic reforms. Volio also expressed support for women’s suffrage. Jiménez Oreamuno opposed the proposal, arguing that women lacked political independence and would vote according to the guidance of the Catholic Church.

In the concurrent parliamentary elections, the National Republican Party won 14 seats in the Constitutional Congress, while the Republican Union obtained 6 seats and the Republican Party secured 2 seats, representing the provinces of Guanacaste and Alajuela. Among those elected as deputies were former president Julio Acosta García, León Cortés Castro, Luis Dobles Segreda and Luis Demetrio Tinoco Castro.

== Results ==
=== President ===
Candidate	Party	Votes	%
Ricardo Jiménez Oreamuno	National Republican Party	35,408	46.65
Manuel Castro Quesada	Republican Union	22,077	29.09
Carlos María Jiménez Ortiz	Republican Party	17,316	22.82
Max Koberg Bolandi	Nationalist Party	1,096	1.44
Total		75,897	100.00
Valid votes		75,897	100.00
Invalid/blank votes		0	0.00
Total votes		75,897	100.00
Registered voters/turnout		118,186	64.22
Source: Nohlen

=== Constitutional Congress ===
Party	Votes	%	Seats
National Republican Party	35,399	46.68	14
Republican Union	22,032	29.06	6
Republican Party	17,302	22.82	2
Nationalist Party	1,094	1.44	0
Total	75,827	100.00	22
Valid votes	75,827	100.00	
Invalid/blank votes	0	0.00	
Total votes	75,827	100.00	
Registered voters/turnout	118,186	64.16	
Source: Nohlen (votes)
