= 1925 Costa Rican parliamentary election =

- 6 December 1925
- 21 of the 43 seats in the Constitutional Congress (Note: For reasons that remain unclear, one of the three seats allocated to Guanacaste Province—which had already been filled in 1923—was contested again in this election. As the Republican Party retained the seat, it is not counted as a gain.)
- Turnout: 35.81% (▼45.05pp)
Party	Leader	Vote %	Seats
Republican	Ricardo Jiménez Oreamuno (Note: Including the votes and 3 seats from the Partido Republicano Briceñista list in Guanacaste.)	43.61	15
Agricultural	Alberto Echandi Montero	22.04	4
Reformist	Jorge Volio Jiménez	19.34	2
This lists parties that won seats. See the complete results below.
Results by province

Mid-term elections for 21 of the 43 seats of the unicameral Constitutional Congress were held on 6 December 1925. The ruling Republican Party received the largest share of the vote, securing an outright majority of its own in Congress. Together with its junior governing partner, the Reformist Party, it achieved a two-thirds supermajority, holding a combined total of 31 seats.

Voter turnout was 35.8%, a decline of approximately 45 percentage points compared to the general election held two years prior.

== Results ==
Party	Votes	%	Seats
Republican Party	13,202	39.75	12
Agricultural Party	7,320	22.04	4
Reformist Party	6,423	19.34	2
Republicano Urbinista	1,425	4.29	–
Republicano Briceñista	1,283	3.86	3
Unión Provincial	833	2.51	–
Republicano Histórico	818	2.46	–
Unión Limonense	385	1.16	–
Agrícola Legítimo	344	1.04	–
Republicano Popular	313	0.94	–
Independiente	290	0.87	–
Agrupación Popular	164	0.49	–
Republicano Independiente	109	0.33	–
Nacional Independiente	87	0.26	–
Comercial Obrero	83	0.25	–
Agrícola Independiente	68	0.20	–
Independiente de San José	39	0.12	–
Republicano Labriego	14	0.04	–
Pecuario	9	0.03	–
Total	33,209	100.00	21
Valid votes	33,209	99.97	
Invalid/blank votes	11	0.03	
Total votes	33,220	100.00	
Registered voters/turnout	92,760	35.81	
Source: Nohlen
