= 1928 Costa Rican general election =

- 12 February 1928
- Presidential election
- Registered: 116,983
- Turnout: 62.47% (▼8.07pp)
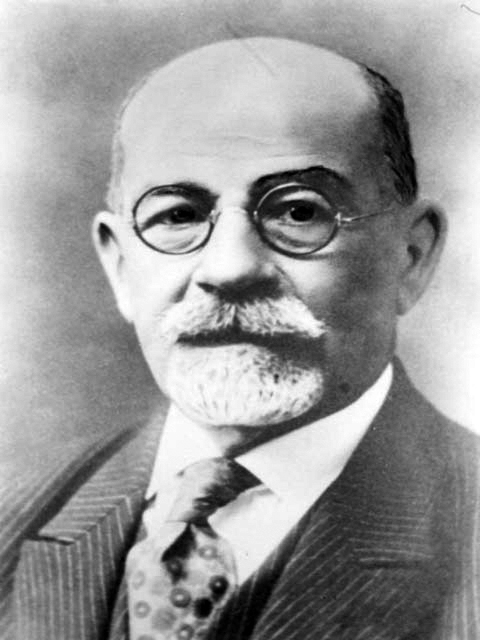

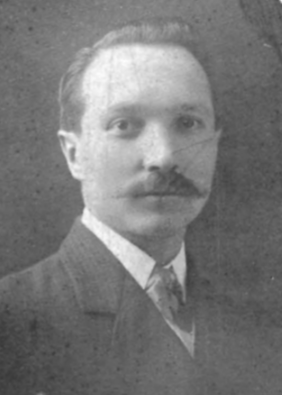
Nominee	Cleto González Víquez	Carlos María Jiménez
Party	PUN	Republican
Popular vote	42,765	29,475
Percentage	59.20%	40.80%
- Official results by province
President before election
Ricardo Jiménez Oreamuno
Republican
Elected President
Cleto González Víquez
PUN
- Legislative election
- 22 of the 43 seats in the Constitutional Congress
- Turnout: 72.76% (▲36.95pp)
Party	Leader	Vote %	Seats	+/–
PUN	Cleto González Víquez	53.26	16	New
Republican	Carlos María Jiménez Ortiz	46.74	6	−9
This lists parties that won seats. See the complete results below.
Results by province

General elections were held in Costa Rica on 12 February 1928. Former president Cleto González Víquez of the National Union defeated First Designate to the Presidency Carlos María Jiménez Ortiz of the Republican Party. The PUN also won the parliamentary election, in which they received 53% of the vote. Voter turnout was 62% in the presidential election and 73% in the parliamentary election.

== Background ==
On 6 January 1926 the delegates of the Agricultural Party, which was the second most voted party in the 1923 and 1925 elections, met at the Moderno Theater of San Jose where they were informed of the resignation of their leader and former presidential candidate Alberto Echandi Montero, later deciding to constitute a new political organization called the National Union Party, a name that had previously been used to bring Ascension Esquivel Ibarra to power in 1902 and later ran in 1913, but which preserved the agricultural green flag (since Esquivel had used a white flag).

The National Union Party nominated former president Cleto González Víquez as its presidential candidate. González Víquez had also served as a diplomat and cabinet minister during the Esquivel administration.[1] His candidacy received the endorsement of the Reformist Party, led by Jorge Volio Jiménez, as well as the support of followers of retired political leader Máximo Fernández Alvarado, known as the "Historical Republicans," who had distanced themselves from the official candidates of the Republican Party.

The rulling Republican Party nominated Carlos María Jiménez Ortiz, a serving deputy in Congress and First Designate to the Presidency under the incumbent administration since 1924. His candidacy was proclaimed on 7 January 1927 at the Teatro América during the party’s national convention. Following the designation of both candidates, the newspaper Diario de Costa Rica remarked that the ideological differences between them were "virtually null."

During the same period, a political movement emerged advocating to reform the 1871 constitution to allow the consecutive re-election of President Ricardo Jiménez Oreamuno. Jiménez firmly rejected the proposal, declaring: "...what would remain of the principles I have defended throughout my life in favor of democratic and republican values? I prefer a mediocre president of the Republic to the most brilliant of dictators."

== Campaign ==
During the campaign, Republican Party supporters criticized Cleto González Víquez by associating him with the so-called Olympus Generation, a group of intellectual and political elites who had exercised significant influence in Costa Rican politics since the 1880s. Opponents also questioned the legitimacy of his first presidency, citing alleged irregularities in the 1906 election. Republican rhetoric portrayed González Víquez as a secretive and conspiratorial political figure, accusing him of misusing state resources and accepting bribes while in public office. Critics additionally argued that his age was a disadvantage, noting that he would turn 70 in October of that year.

Carlos María Jiménez Ortiz likewise faced political opposition. Relations between him and Reformist Party leader Jorge Volio were openly hostile, contributing to tensions with Reformist supporters. As a result of a Reformist boycott, Jiménez Ortiz was unable to deliver a planned campaign speech in Santa Ana. He also lacked unanimous backing within the Republican Party, as some members expressed support for González Víquez’s candidacy.

As incumbent president, Ricardo Jiménez oversaw the organization of the electoral process through the Ministry of the Interior and pledged that the elections would be conducted transparently. The secret ballot, recently approved by law, was implemented for the first time in this election. Authorities also authorized the free use of telegraph services on election day to allow citizens to submit electoral complaints.

== Results ==
=== President ===
Candidate	Party	Votes	%
Cleto González Víquez	National Union Party	42,765	59.20
Carlos María Jiménez Ortiz	Republican Party	29,475	40.80
Total		72,240	100.00
Valid votes		72,240	98.84
Invalid/blank votes		845	1.16
Total votes		73,085	100.00
Registered voters/turnout		116,983	62.47
Source: Nohlen

=== Constitutional Congress ===
Party	Votes	%	Seats
National Union Party	45,198	53.26	16
Republican Party	39,662	46.74	6
Total	84,860	100.00	22
Valid votes	84,860	99.69	
Invalid/blank votes	261	0.31	
Total votes	85,121	100.00	
Registered voters/turnout	116,983	72.76	
Source: Nohlen
