= Alberto Echandi Montero =

Costa Rican lawyer and politician (1870–1944)

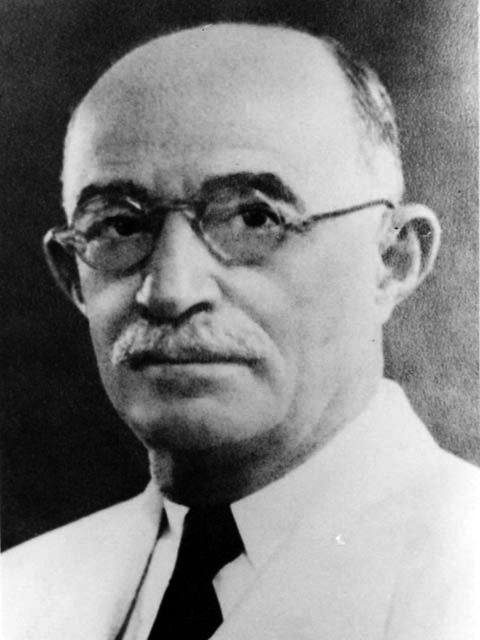
- Echandi c. 1940

Secretary of Foreign Affairs (Note: Simultaneously in charge of the portfolios of Justice, Grace, Worship and Charity.)
- In office 8 May 1940 – 8 May 1944
- President: Rafael Ángel Calderón Guardia
- Preceded by: Tobías Zúñiga Montúfar
- Succeeded by: Julio Acosta García

Secretary of Public Works
- In office 8 May 1914 – 1 July 1915
- President: Alfredo González Flores
- Preceded by: Enrique Jiménez Nuñez
- Succeeded by: Enrique Pinto Fernández

Secretary of Finance and Commerce (Note: Simultaneously in charge of the portfolio of Public Works.)
- In office 28 May 1909 – 8 May 1910
- President: Cleto González Víquez
- Preceded by: Oscar Rohrmoser Carranza
- Succeeded by: Felipe Alvarado Echandi

Personal details
- Born: Alberto Echandi Montero; 18 February 1870 San José, Costa Rica
- Died: 28 September 1944 (aged 74) San José, Costa Rica
- Party: Agricultural (1923)
- Spouse: Josefa Jiménez Rucavado
- Children: 9, including Mario
- Education: University of Santo Tomás (LLB)
- Occupation: Lawyer; politician; businessman

Alberto Echandi Montero (19 February 1870 – 29 September 1944) was a Costa Rican lawyer, businessman and politician who served as Secretary of Foreign Affairs from 1940 to 1944. He previously led the finance and public works ministries, and was the Agricultural Party's presidential candidate for the 1923 general election.

== Biography ==
Alberto Echandi Montero was born on 19 February 1870 in San José, Costa Rica, the fifth child of José Ramón Echandi and Ana Montero. He completed his primary and secondary education in San José before graduating with a law degree from the Law School in 1897. He subsequently established a legal practice.

In 1899, Echandi became a member of the Charity Board (Junta de Caridad), the predecessor of the Social Protection Board. During his service, he promoted improvements to the San Juan de Dios Hospital, including the acquisition of equipment for nursing and surgical services. He also supported the expansion and maintenance of the General Cemetery of San José and the Chapuí Asylum. Echandi later served as Municipal President of San José, where he promoted measures related to public hygiene and urban improvement. He also served as President of the Costa Rican Bar Association.

His government service included appointments as Secretary of Finance and Commerce (1909–1910), Secretary of Public Works (1914–1915), Costa Rican Minister to the Central American republics (1920), Secretary of Finance and Commerce (1921), and Secretary of Foreign Affairs (1940–1944).

As Costa Rican Minister to Central America in 1920, he participated in diplomatic efforts that culminated in the Amapala Conference of 15 November 1920, which contributed to preventing armed conflict between Nicaragua and Honduras.

Echandi was the Agricultural Party's candidate in the 1923 general election, in which he was defeated by former president Ricardo Jiménez Oreamuno. Following the election, amid discussions about challenging the results, he reportedly declared, "The presidency of the Republic is not worth a single drop of Costa Rican blood," a statement that has since become one of his best-known quotations.

During his tenure as Secretary of Foreign Affairs, Echandi signed the Echandi Montero–Fernández Jaén Treaty on 27 May 1941, which established the land boundary between Costa Rica and Panama. Later that year, following the attack on Pearl Harbor, he oversaw Costa Rica's declarations of war against Japan, Germany, and Italy.

In 1923, he became a founding member of the Costa Rican Academy of Language, occupying Seat J. During the final months of his life, he served as president of the privately owned Anglo-Costa Rican Bank. Echandi died on 29 September 1944, aged 74.
