= Ricardo Castro Beeche =

Costa Rican lawyer and politician (1894–1967)

Ricardo Castro Béeche
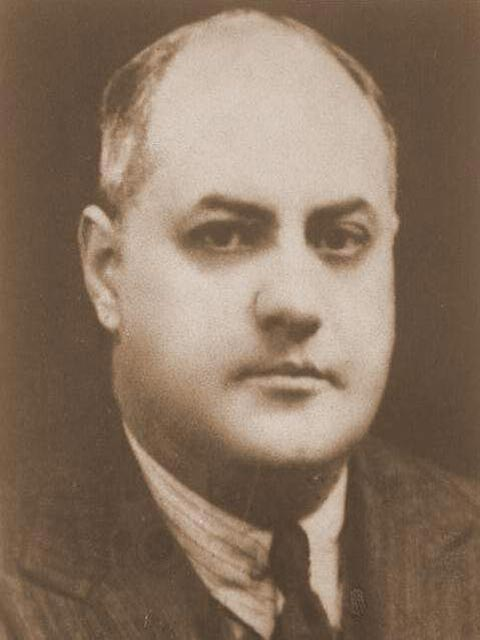

President of the Constitutional Congress
- In office 1 May 1935 – 30 April 1936
- Preceded by: Arturo Volio Jiménez
- Succeeded by: Juan Rafael Arias Bonilla

Deputy of the Constitutional Congress
- In office 1 May 1934 – 30 April 1938
- Constituency: San José Province

Secretary of Foreign Affairs
- In office 2 March 1927 – 8 May 1928
- President: Ricardo Jiménez Oreamuno
- Preceded by: Juan Rafael Argüello de Vars
- Succeeded by: Rafael Castro Quesada

Personal details
- Born: 11 April 1894 San José, Costa Rica
- Died: 9 October 1967 (aged 73) Caribbean Sea
- Party: Democratic (from 1943)
- Other political affiliations: PRN (1931–1943); Republican (until 1931)
- Occupation: Lawyer; politician; journalist; writer

Ricardo Castro Béeche (11 April 1894 – 9 October 1967) was a Costa Rican lawyer, politician and writer who served as President of the Constitutional Congress from 1935 to 1936.

Castro Béeche was born in San José, Costa Rica on 11 April 1894, to parents Roberto Castro Solera and Mercedes Béeche Argüello, whose brother, Lic. Octavio Béeche, was the foreign minister of Costa Rica from 1930 to 1931. He received his primary education at Buenaventura Corrales School and his secondary education at the Liceo de Costa Rica. He then went on to graduate from law school to earn a degree in law.

Castro Béeche alternated between public life and journalism. In 1915 he began his career in national politics as Consul General of Costa Rica in New York. In 1924, he served both as an alternate deputy in Congress and as a personal secretary to President Ricardo Jiménez Oreamuno during the same period. He was named Secretary of State in the Office of Foreign Relations and Annexed Affairs (Justice, Grace, Worship and Charity) in 1927.

Briefly switching to journalism, he was Director and General Manager of the Diario de Costa Rica between 1928 and 1934. Castro Béeche also served as a deputy for two consecutive terms (1930–34 and 1934–38). During his second term, he served as the president of congress for one year (1935–36).

Castro Beeche joined the newspaper La Nación in 1946 as manager and would remain in that position until 1966. In 1950 he was appointed director of the newspaper replacing Sergio Carballo Romero. Castro Beeche served as director of La Nación until his death in an aviation accident on 9 October 1967.
