= Otilio Ulate Blanco =

President of Costa Rica from 1949 to 1953

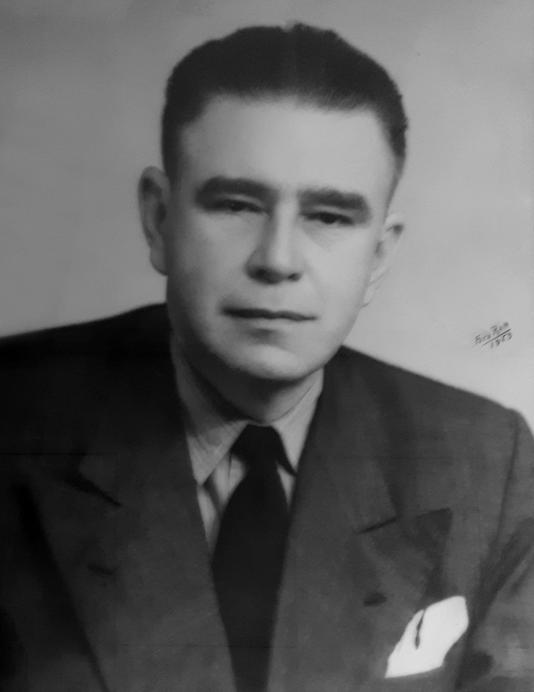

31st President of Costa Rica
- In office 8 November 1949 – 8 November 1953
- Vice President: Alberto Oreamuno Flores; Alfredo Volio Mata
- Preceded by: José Figueres Ferrer
- Succeeded by: José Figueres Ferrer

Deputy of the Legislative Assembly of Costa Rica
- In office 1 May 1958 – 30 April 1962
- Preceded by: Roberto Quirós Sasso
- Succeeded by: Nathaniel Arias Murillo
- Constituency: Alajuela (5th office)

Deputy of the Constitutional Congress
- In office 1 May 1926 – 30 April 1934
- Constituency: Alajuela Province

Personal details
- Born: 25 August 1891 Alajuela, Costa Rica
- Died: 27 October 1973 (aged 82) San José, Costa Rica
- Party: National Unification Party (from 1966)
- Other political affiliations: National Union Party
- Children: 2
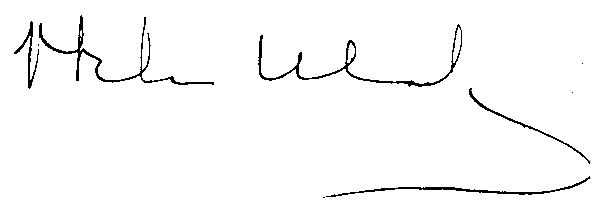
- Signature

Luis Rafael de la Trinidad Otilio Ulate Blanco (25 August 1891 – 10 October 1973) was a Costa Rican journalist and politician who served as the 31st President of Costa Rica from 1949 to 1953. His disputed election in 1948, whereby he was denied victory by the legislature in favor of Rafael Ángel Calderón Guardia, was the direct cause of José Figueres Ferrer's armed uprising of that year and the ensuing 44-day Costa Rican Civil War.

== Biography ==
His French heritage comes from his mother, Ermida Blanco. He never married but had two daughters, Olga Marta Ulate Rojas (1937–2007) and Maria Ermida Ulate Rojas (1938) with Haydee Rojas Smith (British origins)

Blanco started his career in politics as a journalist, director of local newspaper La Tribuna and owner of Diario de Costa Rica, principal newspaper at the time, where he directed his major political campaigns. He was elected as a deputy to the Constitutional Congress for Alajuela in 1925 and re-elected in 1930.

Ulate led the opposition party during the 8 February 1948 elections, where he defeated ex President Rafael Ángel Calderón Guardia.

His government proved a good handling of economical development, Ulate raised the Consejo Nacional de Produccion (CNP)-National Production Committee-, the Central Bank of de Costa Rica (main financial institution in Costa Rica), the Contraloria General de la Republica (regulates government and public institutions' budgets and expenses), the "Ley del Aguinaldo" (law that enforces a 13th month paid salary for all Costa Rican workers during Christmas time), the right for women to vote in National Elections and the foundations for the actual International Juan Santamaria Airport (called "El Coco"), despite the fact that many of his achievements were self-recognized by following presidents. During a visit to the penitentiary in San Lucas Island he also ordered the release of Beltrán Cortés from the unusually public and confined cell President León Cortés Castro had ordered for him and placed him with the other prisoners.

He ran again as a presidential candidate in 1962. He was the ambassador of Costa Rica to Spain from 1970 to 1971.

He was one of the signatories of the agreement to convene a convention for drafting a world constitution. As a result, for the first time in human history, a World Constituent Assembly convened to draft and adopt the Constitution for the Federation of Earth.

Political offices
Preceded by José Figueres Ferrer	President of Costa Rica; 1949–1953	Succeeded by José Figueres Ferrer
