= 1930 Costa Rican parliamentary election =

Mid-term parliamentary elections were held in Costa Rica on 9 February 1930. The result was a victory for the National Union Party, which received 33% of the vote. Voter turnout was 31%.

== Results ==
Party	Votes	%	Seats
National Union Party	10,559	32.56	9
Republicano constitucional	3,481	10.73	4
Unión provincial Esquivelista	2,152	6.64	1
Unión provincial de Heredia	2,127	6.56	1
Unión Nacional Provincial	1,962	6.05	2
Republican Party	1,588	4.90	0
Constitutional Party	1,340	4.13	2
Independiente	1,333	4.11	1
Independiente de Heredia	1,116	3.44	0
Jimenista republicano	1,085	3.35	1
Reformist Party	1,004	3.10	0
Renovación Nacional	885	2.73	0
Agrupación Puntareneña	810	2.50	0
Alianza de obreros y campesinos	744	2.29	0
Jimenista	637	1.96	0
Antirreeleccionista de Oposición	344	1.06	0
Unión National Reformista	317	0.98	0
Unión provincial	288	0.89	0
Defensa limonense	256	0.79	0
Pro-Limón	145	0.45	0
Antirreeleccionista de Guanacaste	125	0.39	0
Provincial josefino	105	0.32	0
Antirreeleccionista Guanacaste	26	0.08	0
Total	32,429	100.00	21
Valid votes	32,429	100.00	
Invalid/blank votes	0	0.00	
Total votes	32,429	100.00	
Registered voters/turnout	105,592	30.71	
Source: Nohlen
