= Domingo González Pérez =

Costa Rican politician (1842–1927)

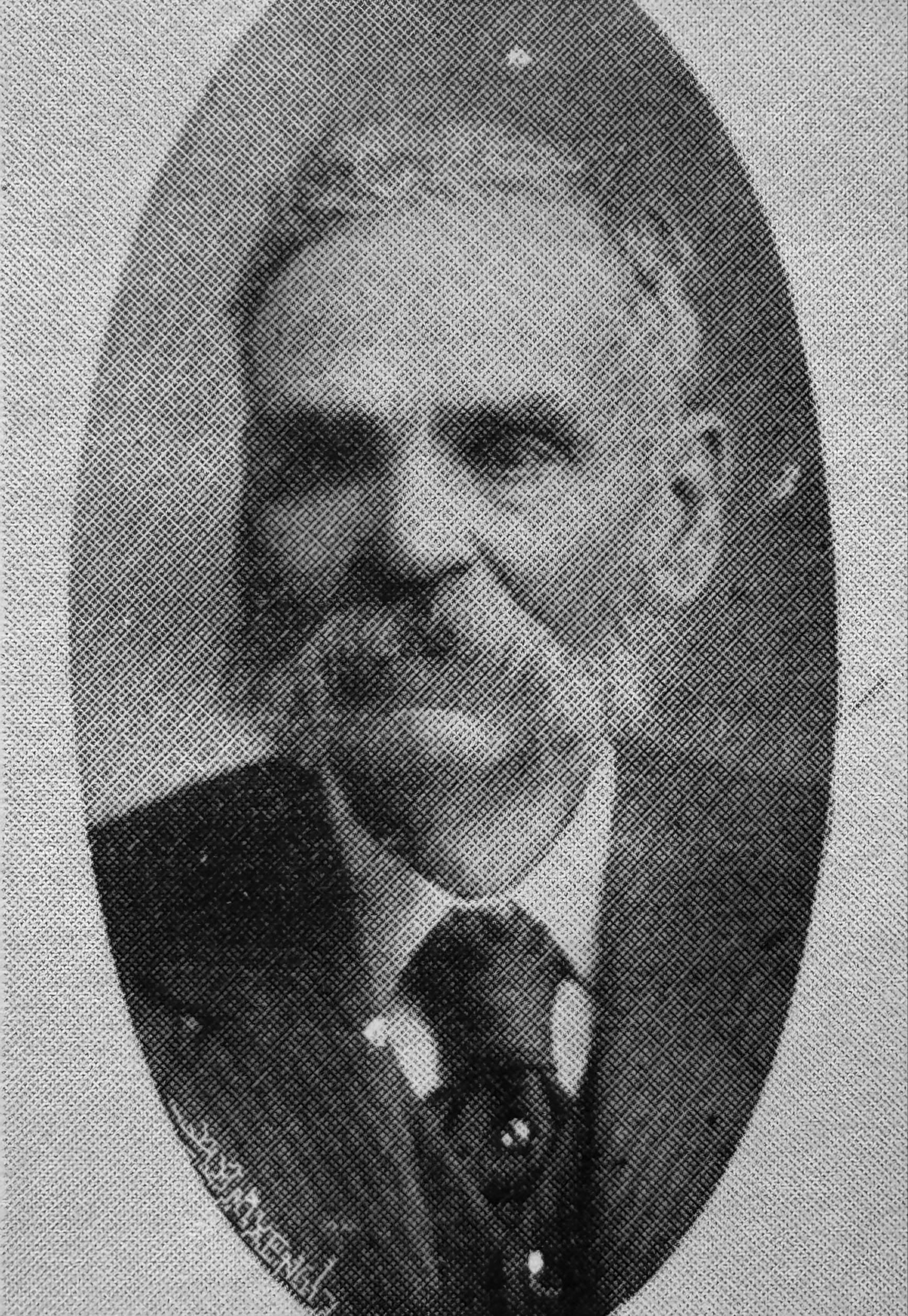
- González in 1914

Second Designate to the Presidency
- In office 8 May 1914 – 27 January 1917
- President: Alfredo González Flores
- Preceded by: Alberto González Soto
- Succeeded by: Rafael Cañas Mora

Personal details
- Born: Domingo Esteban González Pérez; 3 August 1842 Barva, Costa Rica
- Died: 27 February 1927 (aged 84) Heredia, Costa Rica
- Party: Republican
- Children: 16, includig Alfredo

Domingo Esteban González Pérez (3 August 1842 – 27 February 1927) was a Costa Rican politician who served as Second Designate to the Presidency from 1914 to 1917. He married Elemberta Flores Zamora. One of their sons, Ruben Gonzalez Flores (1897–1973) was the Deputy Secretary of State in 1951. Another son, Alfredo González Flores, served as President of Costa Rica.
