= 1915 Costa Rican parliamentary election =

- 5 December 1915
- 22 of the 43 seats in the Constitutional Congress
- Turnout: 50.15% (▼28.43pp)
Party	Leader	Vote %	Seats
Republican	Alfredo González Flores	67.02	20
Fusion	Cleto González Víquez; Rafael Yglesias Castro	26.20	2
This lists parties that won seats. See the complete results below.

Mid-term parliamentary elections were held in Costa Rica on 5 December 1915. The result was a victory for the Republican Party, which received almost two-thirds of the vote. Voter turnout was 50%.

== Results ==
Party	Votes	%	Seats
Republican Party	27,341	67.02	20
Fusion	10,690	26.20	2
Agrupación	2,161	5.30	0
Coalición puntareneña	548	1.34	0
Agícultor Independiente	54	0.13	0
Total	40,794	100.00	22
Valid votes	40,794	98.43	
Invalid/blank votes	649	1.57	
Total votes	41,443	100.00	
Registered voters/turnout	82,637	50.15	
Source: Nohlen
