= 1923 Costa Rican general election =

- 2 December 1923
- Presidential election
- Registered: 98,640
- Turnout: 70.54% (▲13.65pp)
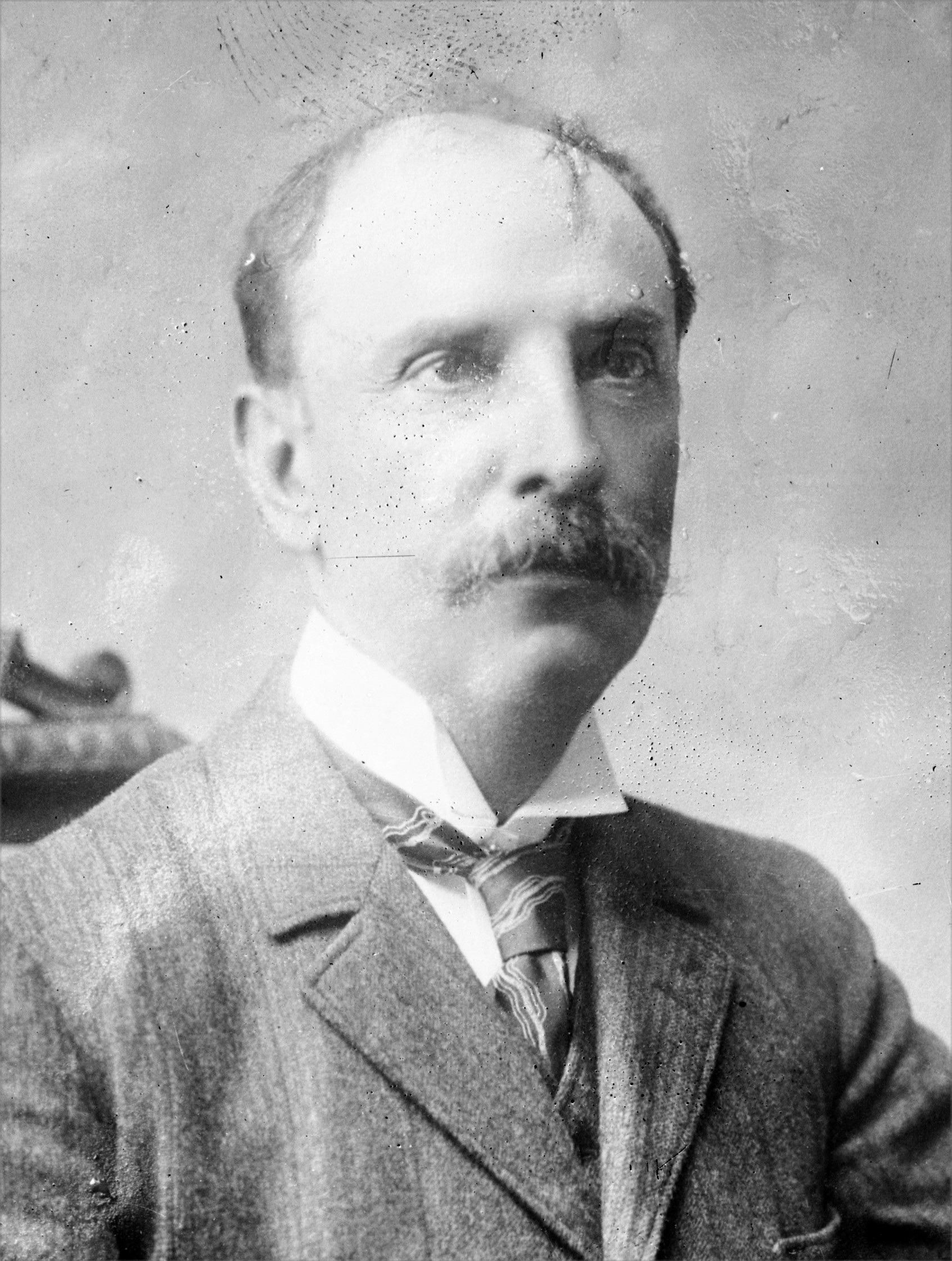

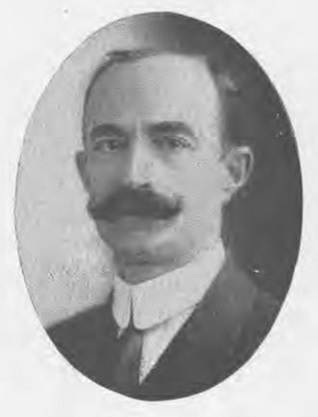

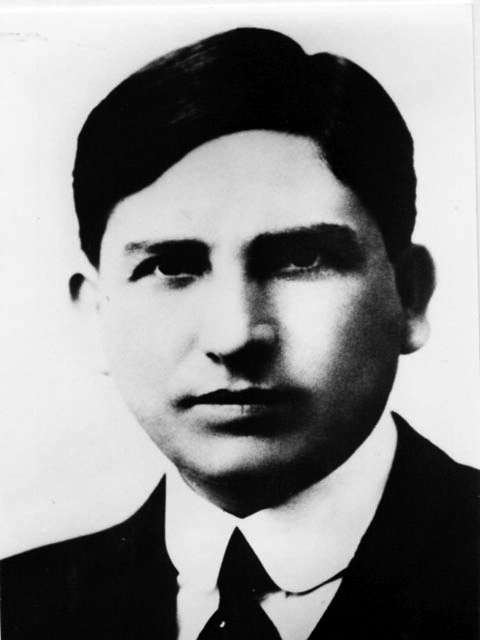
Nominee	Ricardo Jiménez Oreamuno	Alberto Echandi Montero	Jorge Volio Jiménez
Party	Republican	Agricultural	Reformist
Popular vote	29,338	26,114	14,115
Percentage	42.17%	37.54%	20.29%
- Official results by province
President before election
Julio Acosta García
Constitutional
Elected President
Ricardo Jiménez Oreamuno
Republican
- Legislative election
- 23 of the 43 seats in the Constitutional Congress
- Turnout: 83.86% (▲53.47pp)
Party	Leader	Vote %	Seats	+/–
Republican	Ricardo Jiménez Oreamuno	51.46	11	New
Agricultural	Alberto Echandi Montero	31.47	8	−4
Reformist	Jorge Volio Jiménez	17.06	4	New
This lists parties that won seats. See the complete results below.
Results by province

General elections were held in Costa Rica on 2 December 1923. Former president Ricardo Jiménez Oreamuno of the Republican Party won the presidential election, whilst the party also won the parliamentary election, in which they received 51% of the vote. Voter turnout was 70% in the presidential election and 84% in the parliamentary election.

== Background ==
The newly unified Agricultural Party selected its presidential nominee at a convention held at the Teatro El Trébol. The contest was between aristocrat, businessman, and former Secretary of Finance and Commerce Alberto Echandi Montero and former president Rafael Yglesias Castro, leader of the Civil Party prior to the 1917 coup. Echandi received 231 votes to Yglesias’s 123. However, Yglesias urged delegates to support Echandi, as he intended to retire from political life. Yglesias died the following year.

Within the reconstituted Republican Party, grassroots supporters sought to persuade former president Ricardo Jiménez Oreamuno, then a 64-year-old deputy who had served in Congress since 1921, to accept the presidential nomination. Initially reluctant, Jiménez eventually agreed, reportedly declaring, "You do not go with me; I go with you," and adding that "if the devil takes me, I am in good company."

A third political force emerged with the founding of the Reformist Party on 23 January 1923, led by former priest and military officer Jorge Volio Jiménez, who was also serving as a deputy. The party was conceived as an ideological political organization grounded in the Christian social doctrine associated with Cardinal Désiré-Joseph Mercier and influenced by British social and labor thought. It is often regarded as Costa Rica’s second explicitly ideological political party, after the Catholic Union, and has been described by historians as the country’s first "social" party due to its efforts to organize and mobilize popular sectors rather than relying primarily on traditional liberal elites.

== Campaign ==
Both the republicans and the reformists directed much of their criticism toward the candidacy of Alberto Echandi Montero, whom they portrayed as a representative of the country’s most privileged social sectors and accused of having sympathized with the Tinoco regime (Tinoquismo). Echandi, in turn, focused his attacks on Jorge Volio Jiménez, alleging that Volio was politically aligned with Ricardo Jiménez Oreamuno and that the Reformist Party had been created as an electoral strategy intended to divide the Republican vote. Echandi also questioned the constitutionality of Volio’s candidacy, citing provisions of the 1871 Constitution that prohibited Catholic priests from serving as president, despite the fact that Volio had renounced the priesthood around 1915.

Because of Volio’s past participation in armed movements and his abandonment of clerical life, opponents compared him to figures such as Judas Iscariot, Martin Luther, and Pancho Villa. Nevertheless, Volio had previously collaborated closely with incumbent president Julio Acosta García during armed efforts to overthrow the Tinoco dictatorship in 1919, before later distancing himself politically from Acosta over policy disagreements.

Jiménez, on the other hand, adopted a more conciliatory tone toward the Reformists, avoiding direct attacks against them. He declared: "Echandismo is the adversary, because we do not conceive the Reformists as such. Both parties, the Republican and the Reformist, are planets that revolve around the same sun of ideals. (…) If public opinion favors us, the Republicans will say: we have won. If opinion inclines toward the Reformists, we can say that the Republicans have not lost."

In the election, Jiménez obtained approximately 46% of the vote, followed by Echandi with 29% and Volio with 20%, a notable result for a party founded less than a year earlier. As no candidate achieved the absolute majority required to win outright, the selection of the president was referred to the Constitutional Congress.

== Aftermath ==
At that time, half of the Congress was maintained for two more years and the other half was renewed, 23 of the 43 seats. The Republican Party obtained 11 new deputies, the Agricultural obtained eight and the Reformists four, that added to those already in functions (including Jiménez and Volio) would be; 20 Agricultural deputies, 18 Republicans and 5 Reformists for a total of 43. It was clear that the decisive vote would be from the Reformists because the Agriculturalists, even with a majority, did not have enough votes to elect the president alone.

During the counting of votes the Reformist Lorenzo Cambronero organized a popular uprising in San Ramón, which was stifled by the government without major impact, but which caused the cancellation of several polling stations that favored the echandismo, which caused it to lose two deputies that were to give to the Republican and the Reformist, and for which the echandistas accused of electoral fraud.

Following extensive negotiations, the Republican and Reformist parties reached a political agreement. Under its terms, Ricardo Jiménez Oreamuno would assume the presidency, while Jorge Volio Jiménez would be designated vice president. The Reformists were also granted control of the Public Education and Public Works ministries and received support for several elements of their political program.

Agricultural Party deputies attempted to prevent the congressional vote by breaking quorum, but the attendance of a single Agricultural deputy, Gerardo Zúñiga Montúfar from San José, ensured that proceedings could continue. Zúñiga Montúfar stated that attending the session was his constitutional duty. Jiménez was subsequently elected First Designate to the Presidency with the combined votes of the Republican and Reformist caucuses. Echandi received only one vote, that of Zúñiga Montúfar, and Jiménez was accordingly called to assume the presidency for the constitutional term.

When supporters urged Echandi to reject the outcome and organize an uprising, he declined, reportedly stating:

The Presidency of the Republic is not worth a single drop of Costa Rican blood.

== Results ==
=== President ===
Candidate	Party	Votes	%
Ricardo Jiménez Oreamuno	Republican Party	29,338	42.17
Alberto Echandi Montero	Agricultural Party	26,114	37.54
Jorge Volio Jiménez	Reformist Party	14,115	20.29
Total		69,567	100.00
Valid votes		69,567	99.99
Invalid/blank votes		10	0.01
Total votes		69,577	100.00
Registered voters/turnout		98,640	70.54
Source: Nohlen

=== Constitutional Congress ===
Party	Votes	%	Seats	
Party	Votes	%	Won	Total
Republican Party	42,568	51.46	11	18
Agricultural Party	26,034	31.47	8	20
Reformist Party	14,115	17.06	4	5
Total	82,717	100.00	23	43
Valid votes	82,717	100.00		
Invalid/blank votes	0	0.00		
Total votes	82,717	100.00		
Registered voters/turnout	98,640	83.86		
Source: Nohlen, García
