= 1921 Costa Rican parliamentary election =

Mid-term parliamentary elections were held in Costa Rica on 2 December 1921. The Agricultural Party received the most votes, but only 26% of the total. Voter turnout was 30%.

== Results ==
Party	Votes	%
Agricultural Party	6,985	25.50
Constitutional Party	3,115	11.37
Confraternidad Guanacasteca	3,081	11.25
Agrícola Independiente	1,754	6.40
Constitucional aguilista	1,551	5.66
Jimenista de Cartago	1,530	5.59
Unión popular Independiente	1,214	4.43
Constitucional agrícola	1,120	4.09
Regionalista Independiente	1,110	4.05
Republican Party	1,001	3.66
Agrícola verdadero	650	2.37
Agrupación cartaginesa	620	2.26
Constitucional popular	598	2.18
Constitucional carmoinsta	521	1.90
Esquivelista	512	1.87
Fraternidad guanacasteca	508	1.85
Constitucional republicano	367	1.34
Independiente	328	1.20
Progresista	266	0.97
Económico	197	0.72
Republicano Independiente regional	123	0.45
Republicano histórico	117	0.43
Pueblo	55	0.20
Provincial Josefino	25	0.09
Agrícola reformado	16	0.06
Jimenista republicano	14	0.05
Republicano reformado	8	0.03
Republicano histórico reformado	1	0.00
Total	27,387	100.00
Valid votes	27,387	99.97
Invalid/blank votes	7	0.03
Total votes	27,394	100.00
Registered voters/turnout	90,149	30.39
Source: Nohlen
