= 1934 Costa Rican parliamentary election =

Mid-term parliamentary elections were held in Costa Rica on 11 February 1934. The result was a victory for the National Republican Party, which received 48% of the vote. Voter turnout was 42%.

== Results ==
Party	Votes	%	Seats
National Republican Party	22,973	48.12	14
Republican Party	4,126	8.64	2
Republicano provincial	2,848	5.97	1
Unión provincial alajuelense	2,640	5.53	2
Workers and Farmers Party	2,395	5.02	2
Independiente antirreeleccionista	1,601	3.35	0
Unión Herediana	1,392	2.92	0
Nacionalista	1,335	2.80	0
Nacional republicano	1,141	2.39	0
Republicano agrícola	951	1.99	0
Regeneración provincial alajuelense	947	1.98	0
Liga de obreros y agricultores	923	1.93	0
Unión Guanacasteca	863	1.81	0
Agrícola Provincial	793	1.66	0
Nacional Independiente	656	1.37	0
Chaconista	626	1.31	0
Acción socialista	558	1.17	0
Republicano Nacional Richardista	298	0.62	0
Republicano alajuelense	208	0.44	0
Agrícola civil	169	0.35	0
Liga Patriótica	115	0.24	0
Juventud antirreeleccionista	96	0.20	0
Radical socialista	89	0.19	0
Total	47,743	100.00	21
Valid votes	47,743	99.62	
Invalid/blank votes	184	0.38	
Total votes	47,927	100.00	
Registered voters/turnout	115,170	41.61	
Source: Nohlen
