= 1953 Costa Rican general election =

- 26 July 1953
- Presidential election
- Registered: 293,678
- Turnout: 67.25% (▲11.10pp)
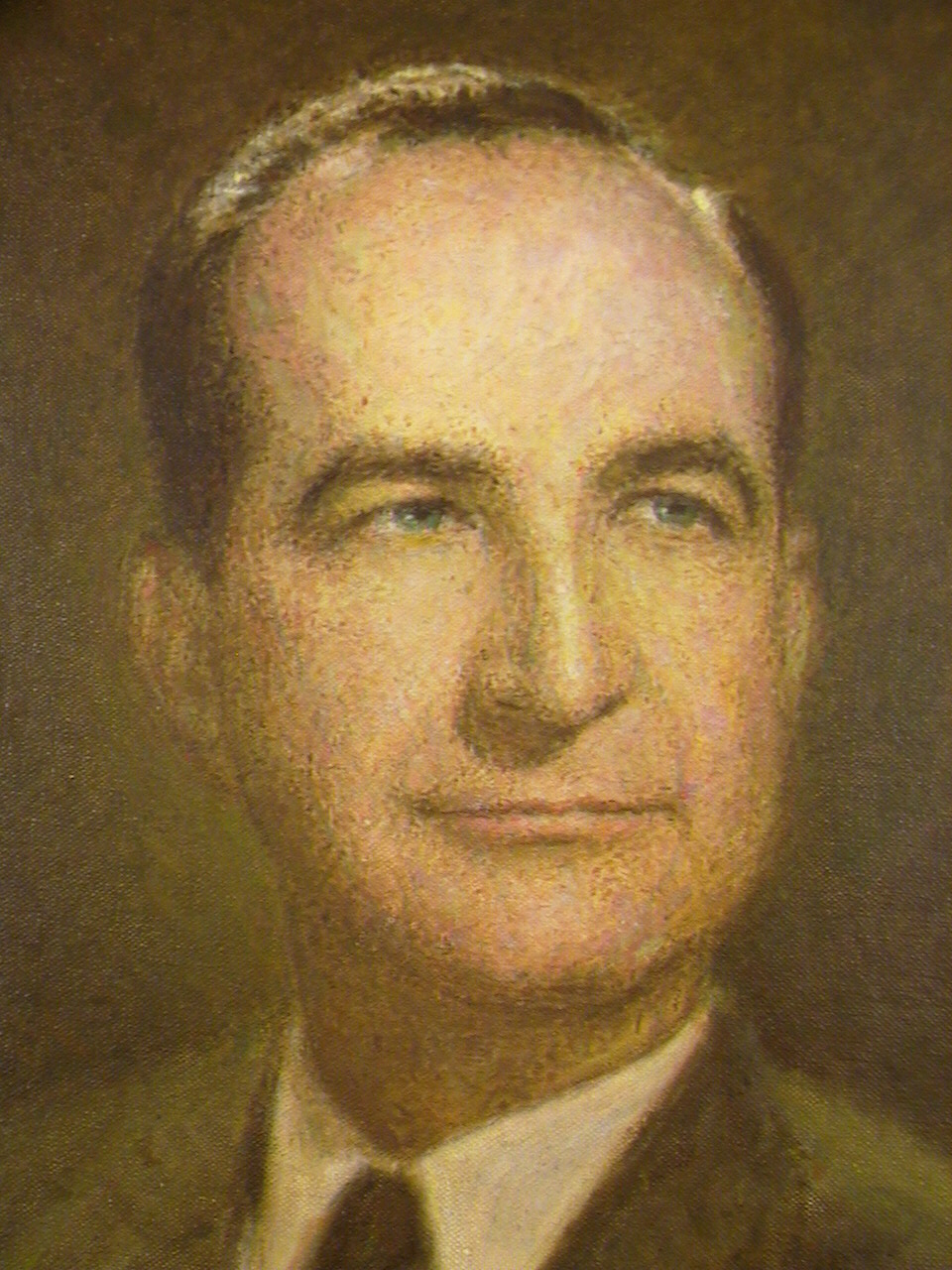

Nominee	José Figueres Ferrer	Fernando Castro Cervantes
Party	PLN	Democratic
Running mate	Raúl Blanco; Fernando Esquivel	Ricardo Castro; Antonio Peña
Popular vote	123,444	67,324
Percentage	64.71%	35.29%
- Results by district Figueres: 50–60% 60–70% 70–80% 80–90% 90–100% Castro: 50-60% 60–70% 70–80% Tie: 50%
President before election
Otilio Ulate
PUN
Elected President
José Figueres
PLN
- Legislative election
- All 45 seats in the Legislative Assembly; 23 seats needed for a majority
- Turnout: 67.51% (▲18.31pp)
Party	Leader	Vote %	Seats	+/–
PLN	José Figueres Ferrer	64.75	30	+27
Democratic	Fernando Castro Cervantes	21.19	11	+11
PRN	Rafael Ángel Calderón Guardia	7.21	3	New
PUN	Otilio Ulate Blanco	6.85	1	−34
This lists parties that won seats. See the complete results below.
Results by province

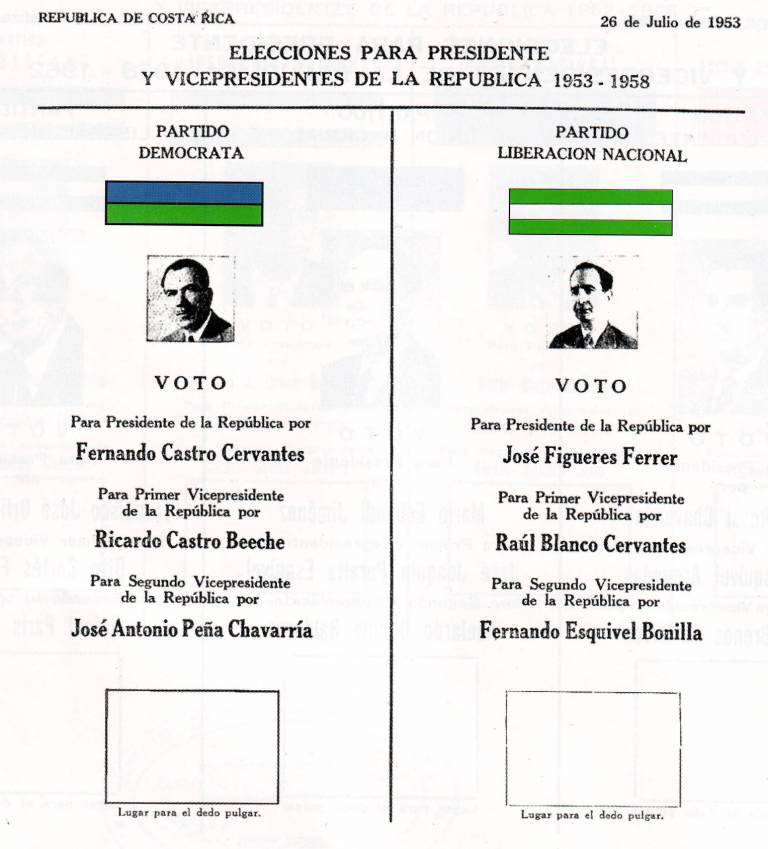
A ballot paper from the elections

General elections were held in Costa Rica on 26 July 1953. José Figueres Ferrer of the National Liberation Party won the presidential election, whilst his party also won the parliamentary election. Voter turnout was 67% in the presidential election and 68% in the parliamentary election. Local elections were also held.

This was Costa Rica's first election since the end of the 1948 Civil War, and democratic guarantees were not fully restored.

José Figueres, the caudillo of the victorious National Liberation Army faction in the Civil War, was the candidate of the newly founded National Liberation Party (PLN). Liberal Mario Echandi tried to be the candidate from then-ruling National Union Party (PUN), but his candidacy was denied by the Electoral Tribunal due to purported irregularities in the adherents' signatures. This move was highly criticized by Figueres' opponents as an action in favor of Figueres' candidacy.

As PUN was unable to participate, the only other candidacy alternate to Figueres was made by the Democratic Party, which nominated wealthy industrial magnate Fernando Castro Cervantes. The three parties—PLN, PUN and Democratic—were all formerly united in opposition against the 1940s governments of Rafael Angel Calderón and his allies, who were viewed as having caused the civil war. Yet, after the war, such unification ceased.

The losing sides in the civil war, mostly the Republicans (Calderón supporters) and the Communists, were unable to participate as the Republicans' party was disbanded and the Communist Party was constitutionally outlawed. The Republicans were nonetheless allowed to participate in the legislative ballot with a provincial party in San José called the "Independent" Republican Party, and thereby gained some seats. As expected, Figueres won by a landslide victory.

== Background ==
The 1948 general elections had resulted in Otilio Ulate Blanco, National Union Party's nominee, winning over former president Rafael Ángel Calderón Guardia and his coalition of the communist People's Vanguard Party and the socialcristiano National Republican Party. The annulment of Ulate's victory led to a civil war that resulted in the overthrow of the calderonista government and the establishing of the "Founding Junta of the Second Republic", led by José Figueres Ferrer. Figueres, a social democrat, reached a deal with Otilio Ulate in which the Junta would govern with all powers (executive, legislative, judicial) for 18 months, introducing a wide array of reformist policies and would convene the election of a Constituent Assembly. In return, the Junta would recognize the legitimacy of Ulate's 1948 victory and would return power to him on no later than November 8, 1949, making him the first president of the "Second Republic" for a period no longer than 4 years.

The Junta constituted itself as a revolutionary government, suspended the 1871 Constitution, with the exception of the individual and social rights. It published several executive degrees with force of law repealing labor rights consecrated in the Labor Code, with the objective of firing calderonista and communist public employees. Alleging the prevention of any potential rise of militarist tendencies looking to frustrate the consolidation of democracy, the Junta abolished the country's armed forces, keeping only a police force to keep national security. Ever since Costa Rica has had no army. Other policies enacted by the Junta include universal suffrage, allowing women, Afro-descendants and illiterates to vote. The Constituent Assembly of Costa Rica, elected in December, 1948 approved a new Constitution, based on the previous one but with several changes, after the first, more progressive draft was rejected.

The new government agreed to maintain the calderonista social and economic reforms, causing discomfort with oligarchic and conservative sectors. Furthermore, Figueres' decision to nationalize all banks and a 10% wealth tax were controversial and led to a failed coup attempt by Public Security Minister Edgar Cardona Quirós, in what is now known as the Cardonazo.

== Results ==
=== President ===
Candidate	Party	Votes	%
José Figueres Ferrer	National Liberation Party	123,444	64.71
Fernando Castro Cervantes	Democratic Party	67,324	35.29
Total		190,768	100.00
Valid votes		190,768	96.60
Invalid votes		2,330	1.18
Blank votes		4,391	2.22
Total votes		197,489	100.00
Registered voters/turnout		293,678	67.25
Source: Nohlen

==== By province ====
Province	Figueres %	Castro %
San José Province	64.1	35.9
Alajuela	67.8	32.2
Cartago	75.0	25.0
Heredia	62.5	37.5
Puntarenas	58.4	41.6
Limón	54.4	45.6
Guanacaste	57.9	42.1
Total	64.7	35.3

=== Parliament ===
Party	Votes	%	Seats	+/–
National Liberation Party	114,043	64.75	30	+27
Democratic Party	37,322	21.19	11	New
National Republican Party	12,696	7.21	3	New
National Union Party	12,069	6.85	1	–34
Total	176,130	100.00	45	0
Valid votes	176,130	88.83		
Invalid votes	13,872	7.00		
Blank votes	8,268	4.17		
Total votes	198,270	100.00		
Registered voters/turnout	293,678	67.51		
Source: Nohlen

==== By province ====
Province	PLN		PD		PRN		PUN	
Province	%	S	%	S	%	S	%	S
San José	64.7	10	11.4	2	17.3	3	6.6	1
Alajuela	67.8	6	26.4	2	-	-	5.7	0
Cartago	75.5	5	18.2	1	-	-	6.3	0
Heredia	62.2	2	31.1	1	-	-	6.3	0
Puntarenas	59.1	3	36.0	2	-	-	4.9	0
Limón	55.0	1	30.7	1	-	-	14.3	0
Guanacaste	53.2	3	36.0	2	-	-	10.8	0
Total	64.7	30	21.2	11	7.2	3	6.9	1

==== By canton ====
San José
Province	PLN	PRN	PD	PUN
Province	%	%	%	%
San José	57.46	22.47	11.44	8.63
Escazú	73.40	10.68	13.68	2.24
Desamparados	76.91	10.76	7.83	4.49
Puriscal	66.38	11.45	16.83	5.34
Tarrazú	71.46	8.02	12.79	7.74
Aserrí	70.72	12.01	11.95	5.32
Mora	67.85	18.52	9.77	3.86
Goicoechea	64.69	19.35	11.39	4.57
Santa Ana	71.19	11.78	14.15	2.89
Alajuelita	60.18	18.54	15.13	6.14
Vázquez de Coronado	79.23	9.87	5.55	5.35
Acosta	71.70	8.61	15.80	3.89
Tibás	67.43	19.77	9.21	3.60
Moravia	66.44	16.64	9.95	6.97
Montes de Oca	69.27	14.54	9.27	6.93
Turrubares	63.50	3.41	27.74	5.34
Dota	73.06	9.19	9.52	8.23
Curridabat	78.52	10.59	8.12	2.77
Pérez Zeledón	84.51	3.04	8.99	3.46
Total	64.70	17.35	11.40	6.55

Alajuela
Province	PLN	PD	PUN
Province	%	%	%
Alajuela	64.77	30.75	4.48
San Ramón	68.53	19.28	12.19
Grecia	66.72	29.60	3.69
San Mateo	70.44	24.50	5.05
Atenas	68.07	20.91	11.02
Naranjo	77.94	18.62	3.44
Palmares	69.48	23.82	6.70
Poás	77.15	16.44	6.42
Orotina	57.80	39.16	3.04
San Carlos	67.07	28.74	4.19
Alfaro Ruiz	67.57	26.98	5.45
Valverde Vega	72.82	25.41	1.77
Total	67.81	26.45	5.74

Cartago
Province	PLN	PD	PUN
Province	%	%	%
Cartago	77.45	15.65	6.91
Paraíso	67.86	16.67	12.47
La Unión	71.25	23.66	5.09
Jiménez	82.89	10.38	6.74
Turrialba	67.94	27.13	4.93
Alvarado	84.42	13.09	2.49
Oreamuno	87.48	6.35	6.17
El Guarco	81.08	17.68	1.24
Total	75.52	18.23	6.25

Heredia
Province	PLN	PD	PUN
Province	%	%	%
Heredia	62.37	30.37	7.26
Barva	59.87	35.39	4.74
Santo Domingo	61.36	33.78	4.86
Santa Bárbara	66.16	27.55	6.28
San Rafael	63.99	27.26	8.75
San Isidro	68.64	27.75	3.61
Belén	60.94	36.45	2.61
Flores	61.77	27.76	10.47
Total	62.59	31.10	6.32

Guanacaste
Province	PLN	PD	PUN
Province	%	%	%
Liberia	58.02	30.85	11.13
Nicoya	48.09	38.41	13.51
Santa Cruz	49.57	43.32	7.12
Bagaces	61.39	30.89	7.72
Carrillo	54.20	33.22	12.59
Cañas	49.16	46.90	3.94
Abangares	63.57	30.09	6.35
Tilarán	63.15	17.91	18.94
Total	53.25	35.97	10.79

Puntarenas
Province	PLN	PD	PUN
Province	%	%	%
Puntarenas	62.64	34.22	3.15
Esparza	58.99	37.92	3.10
Buenos Aires	83.85	14.36	1.79
Montes de Oro	57.96	19.46	22.59
Osa	53.02	41.70	5.28
Aguirre	53.22	44.74	2.04
Golfito	54.92	35.31	9.77
Total	59.14	35.97	4.90

Limón
Province	PLN	PD	PUN
Province	%	%	%
Limón	57.57	35.05	7.38
Pococí	53.61	17.35	29.04
Siquirres	45.54	34.84	19.62
Total	55.00	30.72	14.28

=== Local government ===
Party	Votes	%	Seats	
Party	Votes	%	Alderpeople	Municipal syndics
National Liberation Party	115,553	64.58	163	310
Democratic Party	42,002	23.47	64	14
National Republican Party	10,641	5.95	5	0
National Union Party	10,636	5.94	5	0
Turrialba Independent Union Party	103	0.06	0	0
Total	178,935	100.00	237	324
Valid votes	178,935	90.23		
Invalid/blank votes	19,381	9.77		
Total votes	198,316	100.00		
Registered voters/turnout	293,678	67.53		
Source: TSE
