= 1913 Costa Rican general election =

- 7 December 1913
- Presidential election
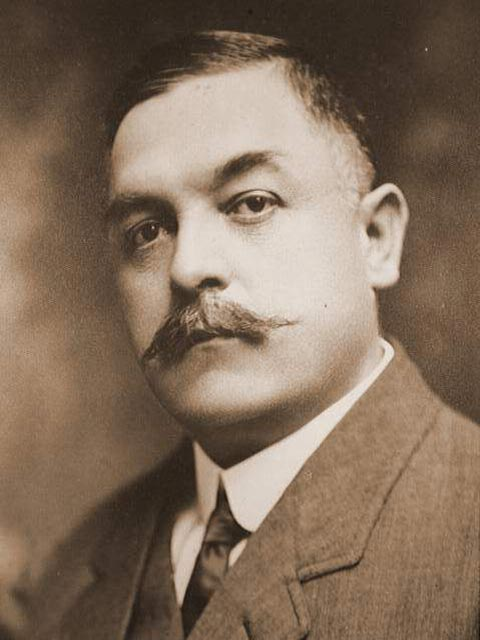

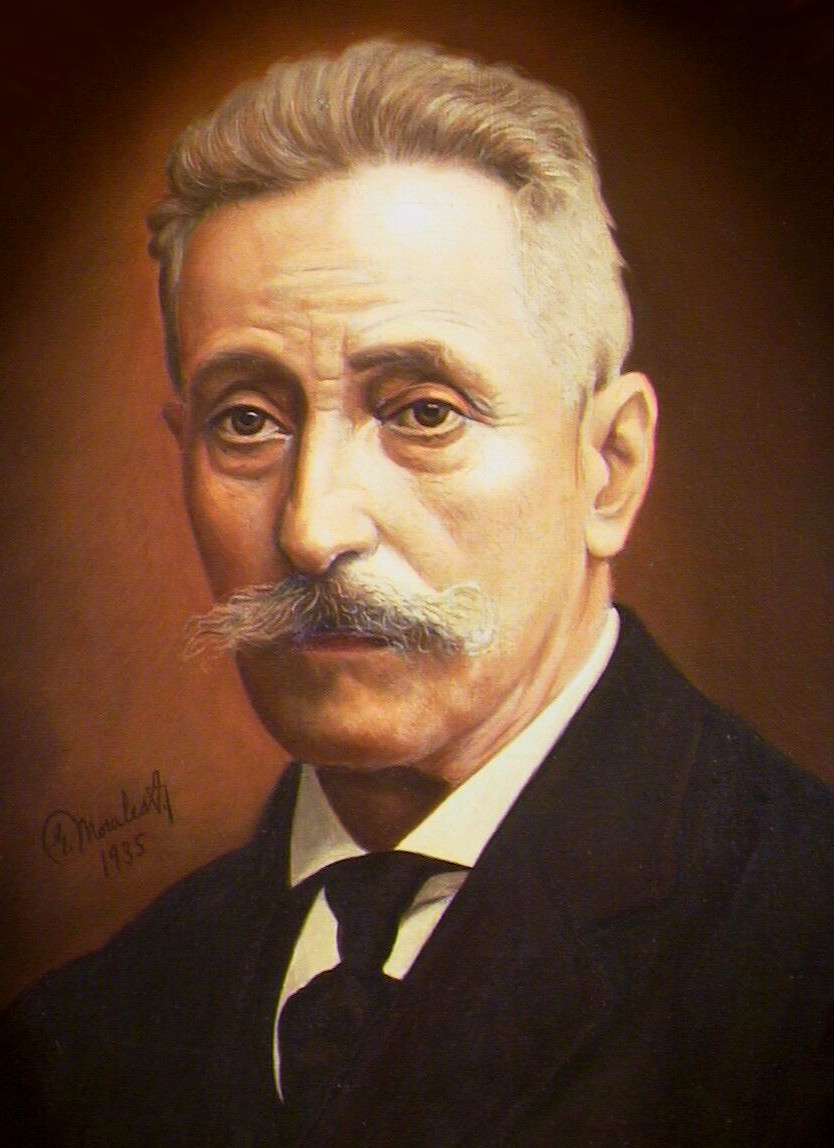

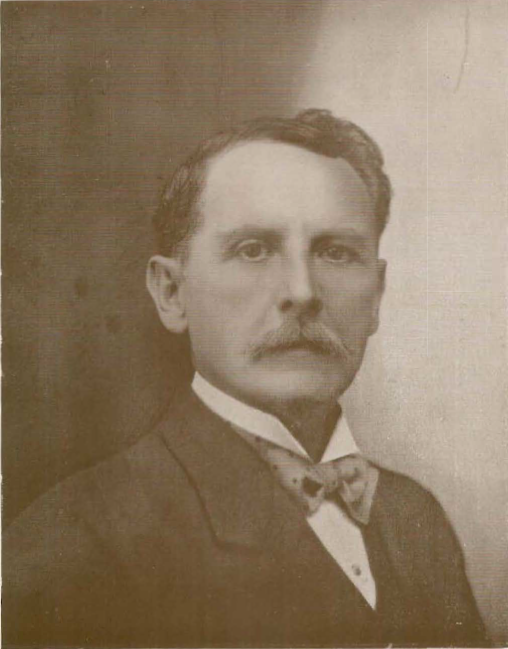
Nominee	Máximo Fernández Alvarado	Carlos Durán Cartín	Rafael Yglesias Castro
Party	Republican	PUN	Civil
Popular vote	26,989	19,818	17,340
Percentage	42.07%	30.89%	27.03%
- Official results by province
President before election
Ricardo Jiménez Oreamuno
Republican
Elected President
Alfredo González Flores
Republican

General elections were held in Costa Rica on 7 December 1913, the first direct elections since 1844. They were also the first elections to have universal male suffrage, after economic and educational requirements were eliminated. Máximo Fernández Alvarado of the Republican Party won the presidential election, but both he and runner-up Carlos Durán Cartín later resigned and Alfredo González Flores was appointed president by Congress on 8 May 1914. The Republican Party also won the parliamentary election.

== Background ==
Yglesias, age 52, had previously been president and his government had been quite authoritarian, among other things reforming the Constitution by force in order to be reelected indefinitely and repressing the opposition and the press. He was supported by the Civil Party, which was basically a personalist party that revolved around his figure. Máximo Fernández, 56, was president of the Congress and a member of the Republican Party. Durán, on his part, was candidate of the National Union Party that had previously ruled with Ascensión Esquivel Ibarra and Cleto González Víquez. Durán was a doctor and was 61 years old, being the oldest of the candidates. He had previously been a Third Appointed to the Presidency (equivalent to Vice President) in the time of Bernardo Soto. All were liberals.

The official candidate was Fernandez, but did not have the backing of then president and fellow party member Ricardo Jimenez Oreamuno, who stayed on the sidelines and did not endorse any nominee.

== Campaign ==
The three parties were clearly identified by the colors of their flags; the blue for the Republicans, the red for the Civils and the green for the National Union.

For these elections the second degree vote had been eliminated so the president was directly elected by the population, however the vote remained public (it would be until a reform in 1925) so that democratic liberties were questionable; public employees had to vote for the pro-government candidate and private employees as coffee workers for the candidate who favored their employers otherwise they could suffer reprisals.

Durán was supported by the upper class, the aristocracy and by "The Olympus" (the elite circle of liberal thinkers) but Máximo Fernández enjoyed great popularity and popular support. During the campaign the candidates attacked each other. Yglesias was reminded of his authoritarian government as a tyrant and despot, as well as highlighting his lack of professional training, calling him a miller and ignorant. Fernández was accused of being an ambitious businessman in collusion with foreign interests and having had links with the Nicaraguan dictator José Santos Zelaya López, in the case of Durán, the attacks focused less on him and more on his political godfather Cleto González Víquez.

Durán and Yglesias had agreed to support each other if the minimum required to win in the first round was not achieved (in which case the Congress appointed the president from among the most voted candidates). However, after the elections and as was effectively anticipated, none reached the minimum, after long and complex negotiations between Fernández, Durán, President Jiménez Oreamuno and a new political figure that appeared in the negotiations, Federico Tinoco, the Republicans decide finely make a bold political move and appoint Alfredo González Flores who had not been a candidate, to prevent the triumph of Yglesias.

Thus, Jiménez Oreamuno gives power to González by symbolically granting him control of the army even before the vote in Parliament, arguing that it was "ceremonial" . Criticized on this matter, Jiménez said:

From duranismo I like the chief but not the party, from fernandismo I like the party but not the chief, of civilismo I don’t like neither the party nor the chief.

== Results ==
=== President ===
Candidate	Party	Votes	%
Máximo Fernández Alvarado	Republican Party	26,989	42.07
Carlos Durán Cartín	National Union Party	19,818	30.89
Rafael Yglesias Castro	Civil Party	17,340	27.03
Rafael Calderón Muñoz		5	0.01
Pedro Pérez		1	0.00
Total		64,153	100.00
Source: TSE

=== Parliament ===
Party	Votes	%	Seats	
Party	Votes	%	Won	Total
Republican Party	27,094	42.30	8	20
National Union Party	19,747	30.83	7	17
Civil Party	17,215	26.87	6	6
Total	64,056	100.00	21	43
Valid votes	64,056	99.16		
Invalid/blank votes	543	0.84		
Total votes	64,599	100.00		
Registered voters/turnout	82,211	78.58		
Source: Nohlen, García

== Aftermath ==
The next day the session of the Congress is held, which had to choose the President. The new elected deputies were sworn in (since part of the Plenary was renewed in each election), eight deputies being "Fernandistas", seven "Duranistas" and six Civilistas, who joined the deputies already in office, where the Republican and National Union had a majority and had forged the pact against Yglesias, of which the Civilistas were informed. Fernández is absent from the session, so it is presided over by Leónidas Pacheco. The Civilistas react furiously. Deputy Luis Anderson Morúa said:

We all citizens are already informed that the President won’t come out of the ballot boxes but out of the Artillery Headquarters.

And about Tinoco:

Cromwell is at the gates but –unfortunately- he’s a Cromwell of vaudeville.

The ruling party argues that having resigned (having read their resignations) the two most voted candidates of the elections; Fernández and Durán, it is legitimate for the Congress to choose others. Finally, after long discussions, it was approved with 36 votes (out of 43) appointing Alfredo González Flores —then 36 years old— President of the Republic.

== See also ==
- 1917 Costa Rican coup d'état
- Liberalism in Costa Rica
- Olympus Generation
