= National Archives of Costa Rica =

National Archive of Costa Rica

The National Archives of Costa Rica (Spanish: Archivo Nacional de Costa Rica) is a decentralized institution of the Ministry of Culture and Youth. It is the governing body of the National Archival System, which manages Costa Rica's documentary heritage and collaborates in the control of the country's notarial activities. Its goals are to preserve and allow access to the documentary history of Costa Rica in a transparent and sustainable way.

== History ==
The National Archives was founded by León Fernández Bonilla on July 23, 1881, under the government of Salvador Lara. It was located in a private house until 1883, when it was moved to the National Palace. In the early years of the Archives' history, staff and facilities were inadequate and the documents were disorganized and in poor condition. Conditions began to improve once the Archives was moved to the Universidad de Santo Tomás in 1889. In 1902, the "Primer Reglamento de los Archivos Nacionales" ("First Regulation of the National Archives") was enacted, providing technical guidelines for the classification and organization of the documents. In 1936, the first issue of the National Archive Magazine was published.

José Luis Coto Conde, who was director of the National Archives from 1948 to 1980, has been credited with revitalizing and modernizing the institution.

In 1957, the Archives was relocated to the María Cristina building in San José. Support from the Organization of American States (OEA) and the Organization of the United Nations for Education, Science and Culture (UNESCO) enabled the National Archives to send staff internationally, mainly to Argentina and Spain, to develop and modernize their skills. Act 5574 on September 17, 1974 created a board of directors for the Archives and finally established a source of permanent funding. Earlier attempts at funding the institution had included an archive stamp in 1934, which was unsuccessful at its goal of funding the creation of a purpose-built site for the Archives.

=== Act 7202 ===
The National Archive System was created by Act 7202, which was signed into law on October 24, 1990. This law established a legal framework for the National Archives, making it the country's largest Historical Archives and placing it as the governing body of the National Archive System. It also established the Comisión Nacional de Selección y Eliminación de Documentos (CNSED) ("National Commission for the Selection and Elimination of Documents"), as an advisory body to the Directorate General of the National Archives in order to establish regulations concerning the assessment and preservation or elimination of documents.

=== Recent developments ===
In 1993, the National Archives was moved to a modern building in Zapote. The construction, which was divided into four phases, was finally completed in 2017.

The National Archive has stood out at international level, actively participating with international archival organizations, such as the Intergovernmental Committee of the Iberarchivos Program; the Regional Committee for Latin America and the Caribbean of UNESCO's Memory of the World program; the Steering Committee of the Latin American Association of Archives, which had a Costa Rican as chair for the first time between 1999 and 2003; and the International Council on Archives’ Steering Committee, among others. The institution has also participated in the Sinergia-ALA network since 2014, promoting the joint dissemination of information coming from various archives of Ibero-America, through social networks.

== Departments ==
=== Historical Archive ===
The Historical Archive is the largest of its kind in the country. It contains all documents, in any format, that have been declared of scientific and cultural value by the Comisión Nacional de Selección y Eliminación de Documentos (CNSED) (National Commission for the Selection and Elimination of Documents). Most materials in the Historical Archive are textual, but it also holds photographic, film, and digital materials. The Archive offers various services related to the consultation, reproduction, and loan of documents, as well as archival training and conservation workshops, and a variety of notarial services.

One of the spaces attended most by the public is the José Luis Coto Conde Consulting Room, where it's possible to access over 7 linear kilometres of documents. The information is organized as approximately 150 documentation collections, of which 93 are public, 16 private, 25 individual, and 18 collections, besides graphics and museographic documents. Additional to this, there are over 220,000 photographs, as well as 54,000 maps and blueprints. The Historical Archive holds documents dating back to 1539.

=== Notarial Archive ===
The Notarial Archive contains legal documents that have been declared to be of scientific and cultural value by the CNSED and which date from 1960 onwards. In addition to preserving and controlling access to these documents, archivists with the Notarial Archive annotate and correct notarial documents and conduct studies on behalf of public institutions such as the Office of the Attorney General, the Comptroller General, the National Registry, and the National Notary Directorate.

=== External Archival Services ===
The External Archival Services Department offers support to institutions in the National Archive System. It performs inspections of archives when requested by the archives themselves or when necessary, such as upon the relocation or closure of an institution. It also provides consulting services when necessary for archives that do not have experienced personnel, and produces documentation on archives best practices. This department is also responsible for the Intermediate Archives, which holds documents of administrative and legal value that have been transferred from institutions that have closed, as well as those documents from government ministries, the Office of the President, and the Governing Council that are judged to be relevant under Act 7202.

== Publications ==
=== Revista del Archivo Nacional ===
The Revista del Archivo Nacional (RAN) ("National Archive Magazine") is a double-blind, peer-reviewed academic journal. Founded by Ricardo Fernández Guardia in 1936, it is the second-oldest scientific publication in Costa Rica. It was first published online in 2018 and has published exclusively online since 2019. English-language abstracts are available in more recent editions.
