= Jorge Volio Jiménez =

Costa Rican philosopher and politician (1882–1955)

General Jorge Volio Jiménez
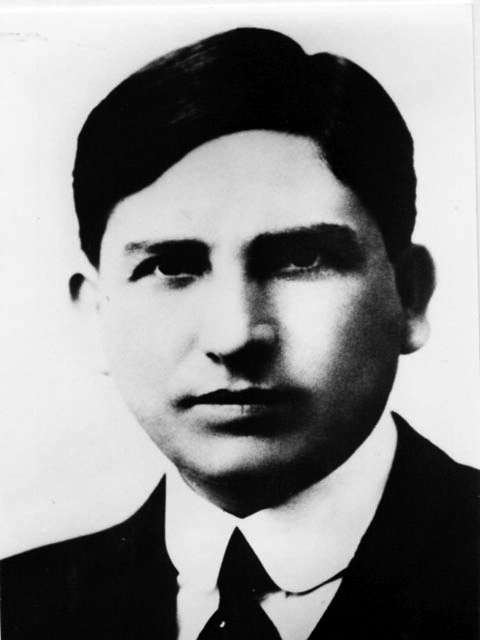
- Volio c. 1920

Deputy of the Legislative Assembly of Costa Rica
- In office 1 November 1953 – 20 October 1955
- Preceded by: Celso Gamboa Rodríguez
- Succeeded by: Fabio Fournier Jiménez
- Constituency: San José (11th Office)

Director of the National Archives
- In office 11 May 1940 – 8 May 1948
- President: Rafael Ángel Calderón Guardia; Teodoro Picado Michalski
- Preceded by: Ricardo Fernández Guardia
- Succeeded by: José Luis Coto Conde

Second Designate to the Presidency
- In office 8 May 1924 – 26 October 1926
- President: Ricardo Jiménez Oreamuno
- Preceded by: Alfredo González Flores
- Succeeded by: Francisco Ross Ramírez

Deputy of the Constitutional Congress
- In office 1 May 1932 – 30 April 1936
- Constituency: San José Province
- In office 1 May 1922 – 26 October 1926
- Constituency: San José Province

Personal details
- Born: Jorge Víctor Ramón de Jesús Volio Jiménez; 26 August 1882 San José, Costa Rica
- Died: 20 October 1955 (aged 73) San José, Costa Rica
- Party: Reformist Party (from 1923)
- Other political affiliations: Constitutional (1919)
- Children: 2
- Education: Catholic University of Leuven (BPhil)

Jorge Víctor Ramón de Jesús Volio Jiménez (26 August 1882 – 20 October 1955) was a Costa Rican Catholic priest, philosopher, academic and politician who served as Director of the National Archives from 1940 to 1948. The leader of the Reformist Party, he served as a deputy in Congress from 1922 to 1926 and from 1932 to 1936.

== Biography ==
Jorge Volio was born August 26, 1882, in Cartago, Costa Rica, to Carlos Volio Llorente and Matilde Jiménez Oreamuno. In 1901, he graduated with a baccalaureate in humanities with distinction (bachiller en humanidades con Distinción Unánime) from the Liceo de Costa Rica. In 1903, he traveled to Belgium to study at the León XII Seminary of the University of Leuven. While in Europe, he also studied at the Saint-Sulpice Seminary of Paris and at the University of Freiburg. In 1906, he graduated magna cum laude in philosophy. In 1909, he was ordained as a priest of the Roman Catholic Church.

After returning from Europe to Costa Rica in 1910, Volio became a parish pastor. However, outraged by his country's indifference to the United States occupation of Nicaragua, he went to Nicaragua to join Augusto César Sandino's guerilla army, the liberales, and was seriously wounded in battle. Returning to Costa Rica, he was given the title of "general" by the Costa Rican Congress. He left the priesthood in 1915.

Volio opposed the military dictatorship of Federico Tinoco Granados. In 1919, he joined the Sapoá Revolution against Tinoco's regime. When the revolution failed, Volio made unsuccessful attempts to organize invasions from Panama and Nicaragua to oust the ruling junta. Tinoco was finally forced to resign on August 9, 1919, not through Volio's efforts but rather due to civilian opposition.

In 1922, Volio was seated in the Constitutional Congress, representing the independence party of San Ramón. In 1923, he founded the Reform Party (Partido Reformista) to fight for the working class and the poor. He ran as the Reform Party candidate for President of Costa Rica in 1924, coming in third behind Ricardo Jiménez Oreamuno (Partido Republicano) and Alberto Echandi Montero (Partido Agrícola). With none of the candidates receiving a majority of the votes, Volio threw his support behind Jiménez and was made second vice president and a member of Congress.

However, when the government was again unconcerned about troubles in Nicaragua, he assembled a force to cross the border and intervene. Jiménez ordered his apprehension. He was examined by doctors and diagnosed with "nervous hypersensitivity"; his family was permitted to take him to Belgium for treatment.

He later returned and served as director of the National Archives. When the University of Costa Rica was opened in 1940, Volio was asked to join the faculty. He was named a professor of philosophy and national history and Dean of the Faculty of Philosophy and Letters.

Volio later as a deputy for the Partido Republicano Nacional Independiente, in 1953. He died in office on October 20, 1955.
