= Republican Party (Costa Rica) =

Defunct political party in Costa Rica

Republican Party Partido Republicano
- Historical leaders: Máximo Fernández Alvarado; Alfredo González Flores; Ricardo Jiménez Oreamuno; Carlos María Jiménez Ortiz
- Founder: Máximo Fernández Alvarado
- Founded: 26 July 1897; 128 years ago
- Dissolved: c. 1934; 92 years ago
- Succeeded by: National Republican Party (Not legal successor)
- Headquarters: San José
- Ideology: Liberalism (Costa Rican); Liberal conservatism; Republicanism
- Political position: Centre-right
- Colours: Blue

Party flag

The Republican Party (Spanish: Partido Republicano, PR) was a liberal political party in Costa Rica formed in 1897. It emerged from a coalition of political clubs opposed to the re-election of President Rafael Yglesias Castro and became one of the country’s principal political parties during the early 20th century. It officially governed from 1910 to 1917, and 1924 to 1928, with members holding office at various points.

Following an internal split, a successor organization—the National Republican Party—was formed and successfully returned Ricardo Jiménez Oreamuno, one of the original founders of the Republican Party, to the presidency. Most of the party’s remaining supporters subsequently aligned with the new organization. After poor electoral results in the 1934 legislative elections, the Republican Party ceased to operate and effectively dissolved.

== History ==
The party first contested national elections in 1902, when Máximo Fernández Alvarado was its leader and presidential candidate. Fernández finished second to National Union Party candidate Ascensión Esquivel Ibarra. Fernández finished second again in the 1906 elections. Ricardo Jiménez Oreamuno was the party's presidential candidate in 1910. Although Fernández received the most votes in the 1913 presidential elections, he failed to secure a majority and declined to take up the post; Congress subsequently elected Alfredo González Flores as president. In the 1915 parliamentary elections, the party received 67% of the vote.

Costa Rica was briefly a de facto one-party state under President Federico Tinoco Granados for the 1917 and January 1919 elections. Although the Republican Party received only 4% of the vote in the 1921 parliamentary elections, Jiménez Oreamuno was elected president in the 1923 general elections, which saw the party receive 51% of the vote in the parliamentary elections. The party nominated Carlos María Jiménez Ortiz as its presidential candidate in 1928, but he was defeated by Cleto González Víquez of the National Union Party. In the 1932 elections, Jiménez Ortiz was the party's presidential candidate again, but he finished third behind Jiménez Oreamuno (now running as the National Republican Party candidate) and Manuel Castro Quesada of the Republican Union.

== Election results ==
=== Presidential elections ===
Election	Candidate	# votes	% vote	Result
1897	No Candidate			✗ Did not run
1902	Máximo Fernández Alvarado	5,697	29.67	✗ Defeated
1906	Máximo Fernández Alvarado	Unknown	Unknown	✗ Defeated
1910	Ricardo Jiménez Oreamuno	39,023	71.27	✓ Elected
1913	Máximo Fernández Alvarado	26,989	42.07	✗ Defeated
1919	No Candidate			✗ Did not run
1923	Ricardo Jiménez Oreamuno	29,338	42.17	✓ Elected
1928	Carlos María Jiménez Ortiz	29,475	40.80	✗ Defeated
1932	Carlos María Jiménez Ortiz	17,316	22.82	✗ Defeated

=== Legislative elections ===
Election	Seats		# of seats	Position
Election	votes	%	# of seats	Position
1902	Indirect election		4 / 17	Opposition
1906	Indirect election		0 / 19	Opposition
1910	Indirect election		19 / 20	Government
1913	27,094	42.3	8 / 21	Government
1915	41,443	67.1	20 / 22	Government
1921	1,001	3.6	0 / 21	Extra-parliamentary
1923	42,568	51.4	11 / 23	Government
1925	14,485	39.7	15 / 21	Government
1928	39,662	46.7	6 / 22	Opposition
1930	6,154	18.9	5 / 21	Opposition
1932	17,302	17.5	3 / 22	Opposition
1934	4,126	14.6	3 / 21	Opposition
