= Agricultural Party (Costa Rica) =

Costa Rican political party

The Partido Agrícola was a political party of Costa Rica. It was founded for the 1923 general election and ran as candidate the wealthy aristocrat and lawyer Alberto Echandi Montero, father of the future president Mario Echandi Jiménez.

The party held a convention at the El Trébol Theater to select its presidential candidate, choosing Echandi over former president Rafael Yglesias Castro. Although Yglesias had asked to vote for Echandi because he claimed to be tired of politics.

During the campaign, the party faced ex-president Ricardo Jiménez Oreamuno of the social-liberal National Republican Party and ex-priest and ex-military Jorge Volio Jiménez of the leftist Reformist Party. Both parties had more ideological closeness to each other because they had socially more progressive positions, while Echandi was seen as the candidate of the oligarchy, so they both focused on fighting Echandi. None of the candidates got enough votes to win in the first round, thus the Constitution prescribed that it corresponded to the Constitutional Congress (parliament) to elect the president from among the candidates. The Agricultural Party obtained the majority in the Parliament, but the combined votes of Republicans and Reformists surpassed it, so the Congress finally elected Jiménez as president and Volio as vice president, relegating the echandismo that tried unsuccessfully to break the quorum. Echandi would continue his political career later getting to obtain important diplomatic and ministerial positions, but the Agricultural Party would disappear, dissolving on January 6, 1926.
