= Alfredo González Flores =

President of Costa Rica from 1914 to 1917

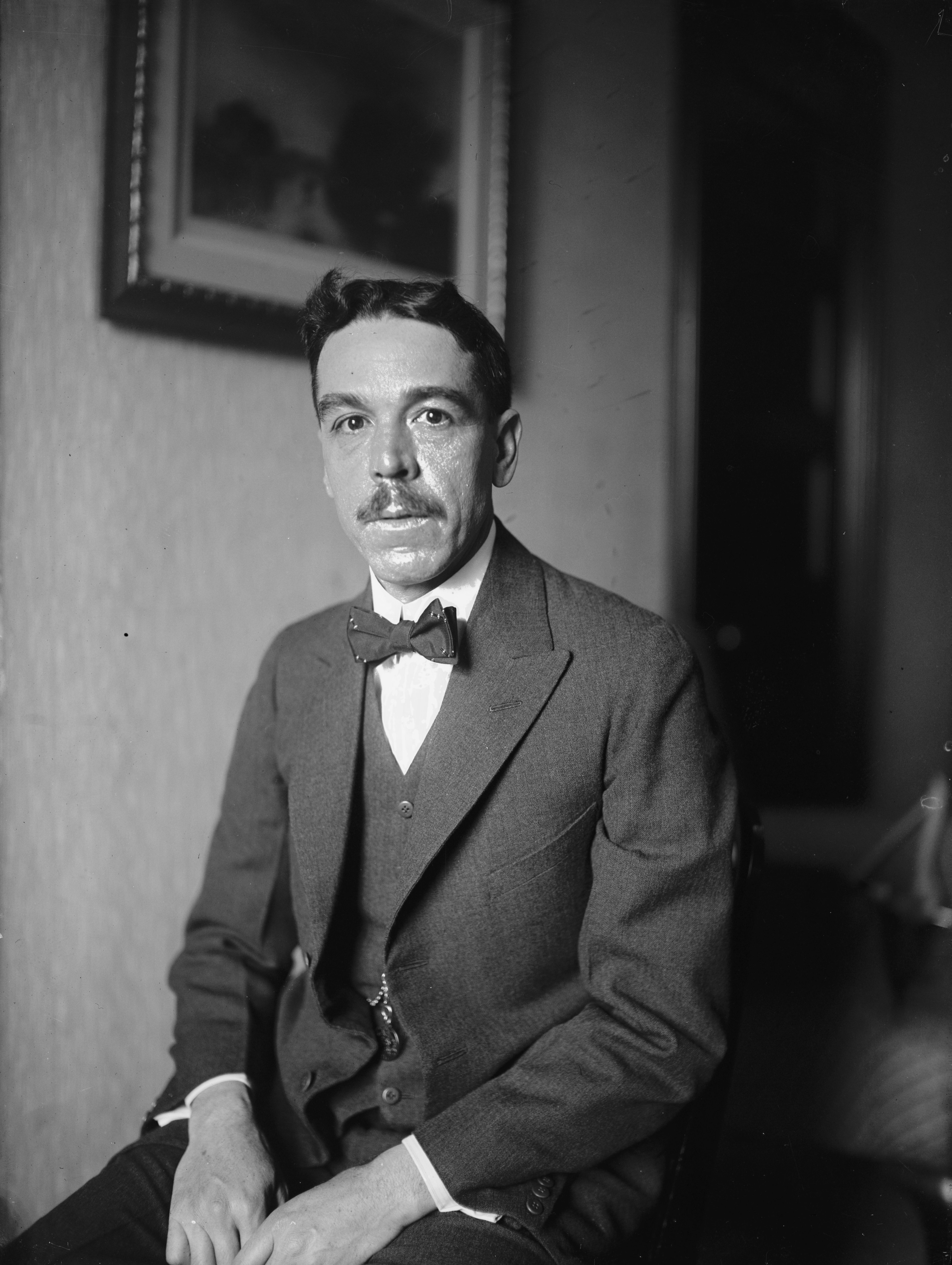
- González in 1922

20th President of Costa Rica
- In office 8 May 1914 – 27 January 1917
- Preceded by: Ricardo Jiménez Oreamuno
- Succeeded by: Federico Tinoco Granados

Second Designate to the Presidency
- In office 8 May 1920 – 8 May 1924
- President: Julio Acosta García
- Preceded by: Carlos María Jiménez Ortiz
- Succeeded by: Jorge Volio Jiménez

Deputy of the Constitutional Congress
- In office 1 May 1910 – 30 April 1914
- Constituency: Heredia Province

Personal details
- Born: Alfredo Roberto de Jesús González Flores; 15 June 1877 Heredia, Costa Rica
- Died: 28 December 1962 (aged 85) Heredia, Costa Rica
- Party: Republican
- Spouse: Delia Morales Gutiérrez (m. 1922; died 1957)
- Parent(s): Domingo González Pérez; Elemberta Flores Zamora

Alfredo Roberto de Jesús González Flores (15 June 1877 – 28 December 1962) was a Costa Rican lawyer and politician who served as the 20th President of Costa Rica from 1914 to 1917. He was unable to complete his presidential mandate following a coup d'état on 27 January 1917, led by Federico Tinoco, his secretary for War and the Navy.

== Early life ==
González was born in Heredia, Costa Rica on 15 June 1877 as the son of Domingo González Pérez and Elemberta Flores Zamora. He graduated from the Liceo de Costa Rica in 1896 and obtained his law degree in 1903.

== Political years ==
He was called to the Presidency on 8 May 1914 by the Congress, as part of a pact between the two major political parties, the Republican Party and the Duranista party, after none of the three competing parties managed to secure an absolute majority. Political scientist James L. Busey called him a "compromise dark horse candidate".

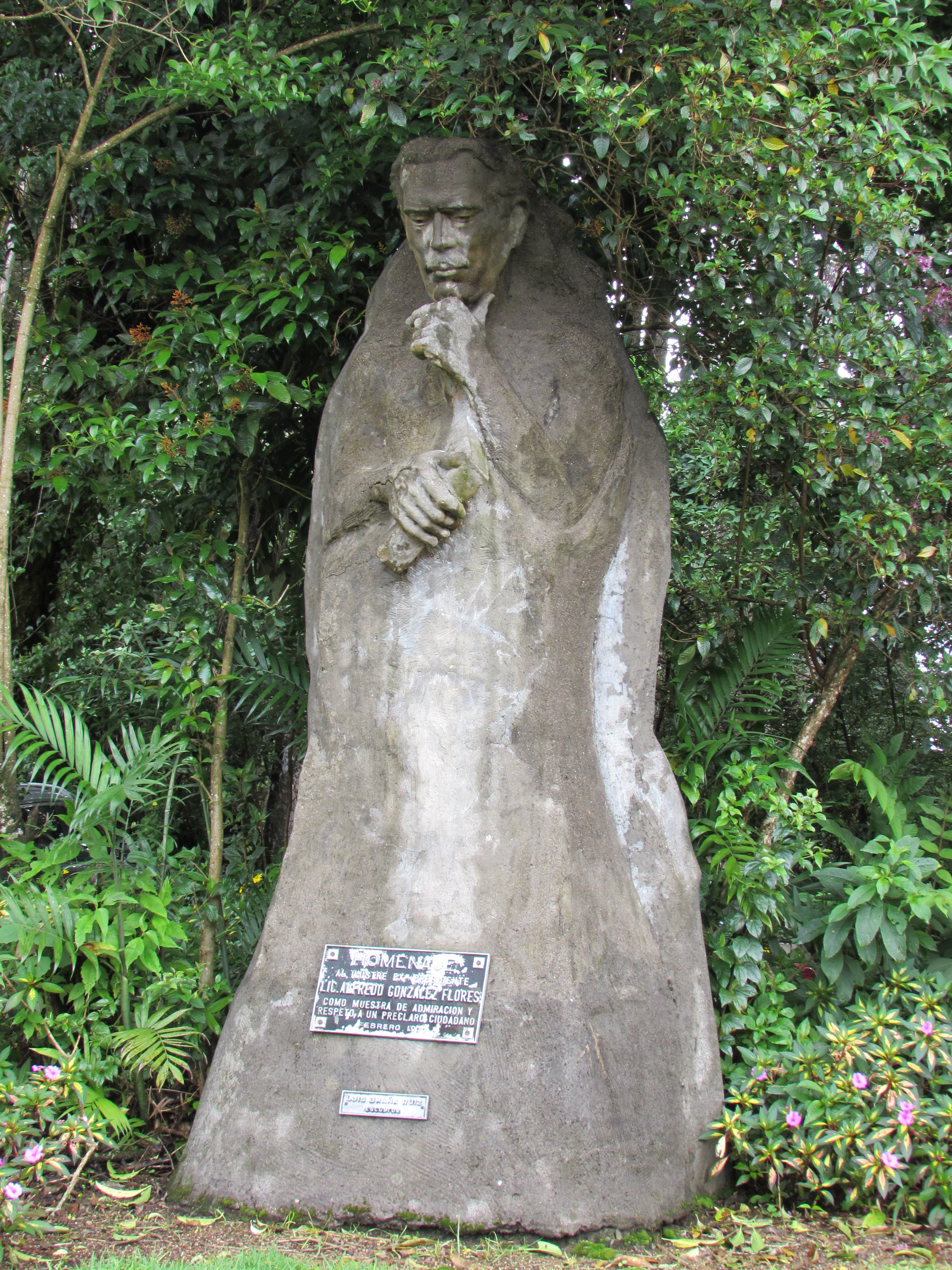
Statue in homage to Don Alfredo, ex-president of Costa Rica (1914–1917)

During his administration, he founded the Normal School of Heredia (1915, of which he also was President of the Board), the National Electricity Cabinet and the International Bank of Costa Rica (now the National Bank of Costa Rica). He also created the Agricultural Credit Meetings, which led to a resurgence of economic, commercial and industrial activity in the country. He established the General Depots, the system of direct taxation and the Charity Tax Law. He governed during World War I, a time when he endured serious financial consequences. At a time when banks refused to facilitate credit for the Executive Branch, he created the International Bank, which had the ability to issue currency. From that moment, the State competed with private institutions. Busey summarized his presidential term as "Attempted to promote fiscal stability; but much nepotism and electoral fraud".

On 27 January 1917, his own Secretary of the Army and Navy, Federico Tinoco, overthrew him. González followed the advice of his other ministers and left the country for the United States. He later worked for the recognition of the country's rights in different international forums. After returning to the country, he played an important role in the politics of Heredia.

He was considered an authority in financial matters and a precursor of modern democracy. He was declared a national hero (Benemérito de la Patria) on 23 July 1954. He died in Heredia on 28 December 1962.

== Legacy ==
González was a precursor of modern democracy in Costa Rica. He was declared a national hero and is known for his wise financial decisions in government. He co-founded the largest commercial bank in Costa Rica and his face is currently found on the front of the 5,000 colon bank note. He is seen as a Republican liberal.

== See also ==
- Museo de Cultura Popular

Political offices
Preceded by Ricardo Jiménez Oreamuno	President of Costa Rica; 1914-1917	Succeeded by Federico Tinoco Granados
