= Ricardo Jiménez Oreamuno =

Former President of Costa Rica

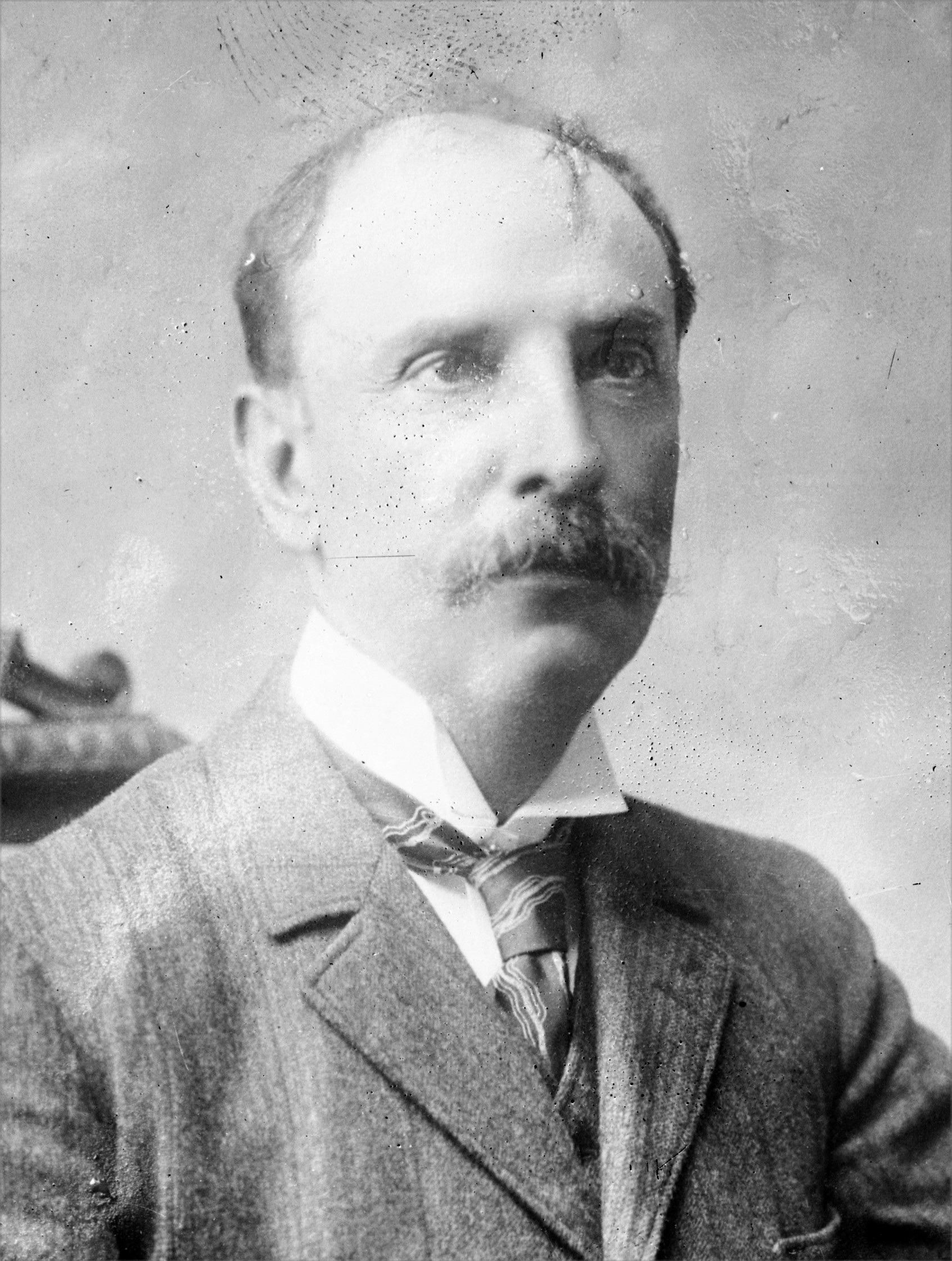

19th, 25th and 27th President of Costa Rica
- In office 8 May 1932 – 8 May 1936
- Preceded by: Cleto González Víquez
- Succeeded by: León Cortés Castro
- In office 8 May 1924 – 8 May 1928
- Preceded by: Julio Acosta García
- Succeeded by: Cleto González Víquez
- In office 8 May 1910 – 8 May 1914
- Preceded by: Cleto González Víquez
- Succeeded by: Alfredo González Flores

President of the Constitutional Congress
- In office 1 May 1909 – 30 April 1910
- Preceded by: Juan Bautista Quirós Segura
- Succeeded by: Ezequiel Gutiérrez Iglesias
- In office 1 May 1903 – 30 April 1904
- Preceded by: Francisco María Yglesias Llorente
- Succeeded by: Mauro Fernández Acuña

Deputy of the Constitutional Congress
- In office 1 May 1922 – 8 May 1924
- Constituency: San José Province
- In office 1 May 1906 – 30 April 1910
- Constituency: San José Province
- In office 1 May 1902 – 30 April 1906
- Constituency: Cartago Province

First Designate to the Presidency
- In office 23 July 1902 – 8 May 1906
- President: Ascensión Esquivel Ibarra
- Preceded by: Rafael Yglesias Castro
- Succeeded by: Carlos Durán Cartín

29th President of the Supreme Court
- In office 8 May 1890 – 1 September 1892
- Preceded by: Vicente Sáenz Llorente
- Succeeded by: Ramón Carranza Ramírez

Secretary of Foreign Affairs (Note: Simultaneously in charge of the portfolios of Justice, Grace, Worship and Charity.)
- In office 8 November 1889 – 8 May 1890
- President: Carlos Durán Cartín (acting)
- Preceded by: Himself
- Succeeded by: Ezequiel Gutiérrez Iglesias
- In office 26 September 1889 – 4 October 1889
- President: Bernardo Soto Alfaro
- Preceded by: Ezequiel Gutiérrez Iglesias
- Succeeded by: Himself

Secretary of Interior and Police (Note: Simultaneously in charge of the portfolio of Public Works.)
- In office 4 October 1886 – 5 November 1886
- President: Bernardo Soto Alfaro
- Preceded by: Santiago de la Guardia
- Succeeded by: José Astúa Aguilar (acting)

Additional positions
- 1886: Minister to Mexico
- 1885: Municipal President of San José

Personal details
- Born: Romualdo Ricardo Jiménez Oreamuno; 6 February 1859 Cartago, Costa Rica
- Died: 4 January 1945 (aged 85) San José, Costa Rica
- Party: PRN (from 1931)
- Other political affiliations: Republican
- Spouses: Beatriz Zamora López (m. 1928; died 1933) María Eugenia Calvo Badia (m. 1936)
- Children: 1
- Education: University of Santo Tomás (LLB)
- Occupation: Lawyer; diplomat; politician; writer
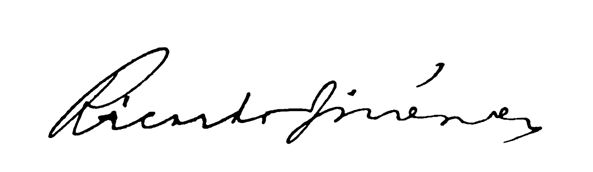
- Signature
- Nickname: El brujo del Irazú

Romualdo Ricardo Jiménez Oreamuno (6 February 1859 – 4 January 1945) was a Costa Rican lawyer and statesman who served as President of Costa Rica on three occasions: 1910–1914, 1924–1928, and 1932–1936. A prominent figure in Costa Rican liberal politics, he was affiliated with the Republican Party and later the National Republican Party.

In addition to his presidential terms, Jiménez was elected to the Constitutional Congress on three occasions. He also held positions in the executive and judicial branches, serving as Secretary of the Interior, Police and Public Works in 1886, Secretary of Foreign Affairs from 1889 to 1890 and as President of the Supreme Court of Justice from 1890 to 1892.

The son of two-time president Jesús Jiménez Zamora, Ricardo Jiménez was one of the most prominent lawyers and liberal politicians in Costa Rican history. He graduated from the University of Santo Tomás and built a career that would span multiple branches of government.

Shortly before the beginning of his first presidential term in 1910, the province of Cartago was struck by a devastating earthquake that destroyed much of the city and resulted in hundreds of fatalities. As Cartago was the largest city in the country at the time, one of the central challenges of Jiménez's first administration was overseeing its reconstruction. In response to the disaster, his government enacted a ban on adobe construction, which had proven particularly vulnerable during the quake. Another significant achievement of his first term was the restructuring and consolidation of Costa Rica’s external debt, including the repayment of a substantial portion of the country's obligations to France.

Jiménez was re-elected to the presidency in 1923. During his second term (1924–1928), he oversaw a series of institutional and infrastructure developments. Notable achievements included the establishment of the National Insurance Bank (Banco Nacional de Seguros), the Bank of Mortgage Credit (Banco de Crédito Hipotecario), and the School of Agriculture (Escuela de Agricultura). He also founded the Ministry of Health, marking a significant advancement in public health governance. In terms of infrastructure, his administration initiated the electrification of the Pacific railway system and advanced the development of the Pacific port of Puntarenas. After completing his term, Jiménez temporarily withdrew from political life for a period of four years.

Jiménez was constitutionally elected to his final presidential term in 1932. During this period, his administration focused on improving the country’s infrastructure and educational system. Several large school buildings were constructed to accommodate students, while road networks across Costa Rica were expanded and upgraded. Additionally, his government developed an aqueduct system beginning in the Central Valley at Ojo de Agua, which extended to the Pacific Ocean at Puntarenas. Significant infrastructure projects during his term included the construction of the bridge connecting Filadelfia and Liberia, as well as the Old National Theater.

Ricardo Jiménez died in San José on 4 January 1945.

== Notes ==
Political offices
Preceded by Cleto González	President of Costa Rica; 1910–1914	Succeeded by Alfredo González Flores
Preceded by Julio Acosta García	President of Costa Rica; 1924–1928	Succeeded by Cleto González
Preceded by Cleto González	President of Costa Rica; 1932–1936	Succeeded by León Cortés Castro
