= National Union Party (Costa Rica) =

Right wing party in Costa Rica

National Union Party Partido Unión Nacional
- President: Arturo Acosta Mora
- Founded: (Most recent) July 28, 2005
- Ideology: Liberal conservatism Conservative liberalism Christian democracy
- Political position: Centre-right
- Colours: Green and yellow

Party flag

The National Union Party (Spanish: Partido Unión Nacional) is the name of several parties in Costa Rica, generally located on the centre-right of the political spectrum.

The first party using that name was led by Ascensión Esquivel Ibarra as leader and candidate for the 1901 and 1913 elections. Ibarra was liberal as most of the Costa Rican political elite at the time. The party also took part in the 1915 parliamentary election. Carlos Durán Cartín was also candidate for the party in latter elections.

Liberal journalist Otilio Ulate Blanco took control of the party and was part of an oppositional alliance of parties against Republican candidate Rafael Angel Calderón Guardia in 1948 allegedly winning the election. The results were contested and latter annulled by the government causing the short-lived 48's Civil War.

Ulate's supporters won the war and name him president-elect (even when the military leader José Figueres took temporary control of the government with a de facto Junta) and a Constituent Assembly was called to draft a new Constitution, with PUN winning most of the seats.

Unable to participate in the 1953 election (the first since restoration of democracy) due to a very controversial decision from the Electoral Tribunal, it was until 1958 that its candidate Mario Echandi would win the election, thanks in part to Calderon's support. Even when Echandi and Ulate were enemies of Calderon in the past, they joined forces against the now common enemy; Figueres’ party, PLN.

Nevertheless, the following election Ulate's PUN and Calderón's PRN went separate postulating each of the parties’ leaders, splitting the opposition's vote and with PLN gaining triumph. PRN won more votes than PUN on that election. PUN and PRN agree to stand together in the 1966 election with a consensus candidate; college professor José Joaquín Trejos earning a very tight victory.

PUN diminishes after this election never achieving power again. In 2005 Mario Echandi's nephew and former Costa Rican Ombudsman José Manuel Echandi funded a party with the same name and was endorsed by his uncle, yet the party receive only 1.6% of the presidential vote and one legislative seat for Echandi himself. Echandi abandoned the party mid-term with mutual accusations of corruption among him and the party's National Committee. The party supported the candidacy of Libertarian Movement’s party Otto Guevara for the 2014 election with party's president Arturo Acosta entering the campaign team.
