= Constitutional Congress of Costa Rica =

Constitutional Congress Congreso Constitucional

Type
- Type: Unicameral

Structure
- Seats: 46 (1948)
- Political groups: Last composition: PRN (21); PUN (9); Democratic (9); PVP (7)

Elections
- First election: 2 April 1872
- Last election: 8 February 1948

Meeting place
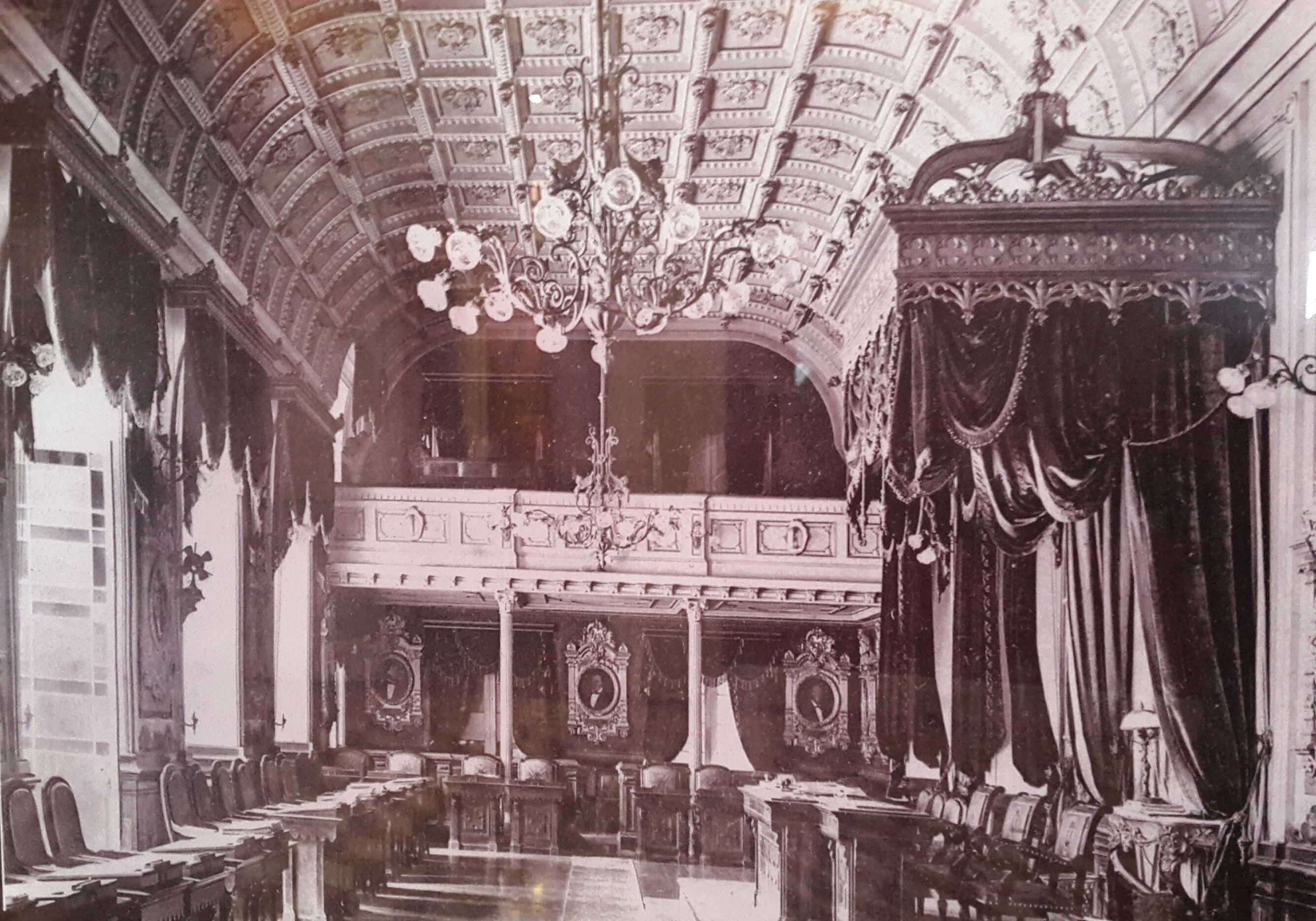
- National Palace; Merced, San José

The Constitutional Congress was the unicameral parliament of the First Costa Rican Republic for most of its history. It was established in the 1871 Constitution.

It consisted of 43 deputies and 18 alternates elected proportionally by provinces at the rate of one deputy for every 15,000 inhabitants with, among other powers, being able to choose the President in case none of the candidates obtained the minimum required to be elected, as happened in the 1913 election, the first election that were held with direct popular vote, and in which none of the candidates; Máximo Fernández Alvarado, Carlos Durán Cartín and Rafael Yglesias Castro, gathered enough votes to win in the first round. It was therefore the responsibility of the Congress to choose the president from among the candidates, but all of them withdrew their name and Alfredo González Flores was chosen.

After the controversial election of 1948 in which both the opposition and the ruling party proclaimed themselves victors and accused the other side of electoral fraud, the Constitutional Congress dominated by the ruling party annulled the presidential elections (but not the parliamentary elections where the ruling coalition had been favored) and civil war broke out. The opposition defeated the government of Teodoro Picado Michalski and called upon a new Constitutional Assembly that drafted the 1949 Constitution. This created the Legislative Assembly of Costa Rica, also unicameral and made up of 45 deputies later increased to 57, so that the Constitutional Congress ceases to exist.
