= 1902 Costa Rican general election =

- 15–17 December 1901 (popular vote); 16 February 1902 (electoral college)
- Presidential election

770 members of the Electoral College 386 votes needed to win
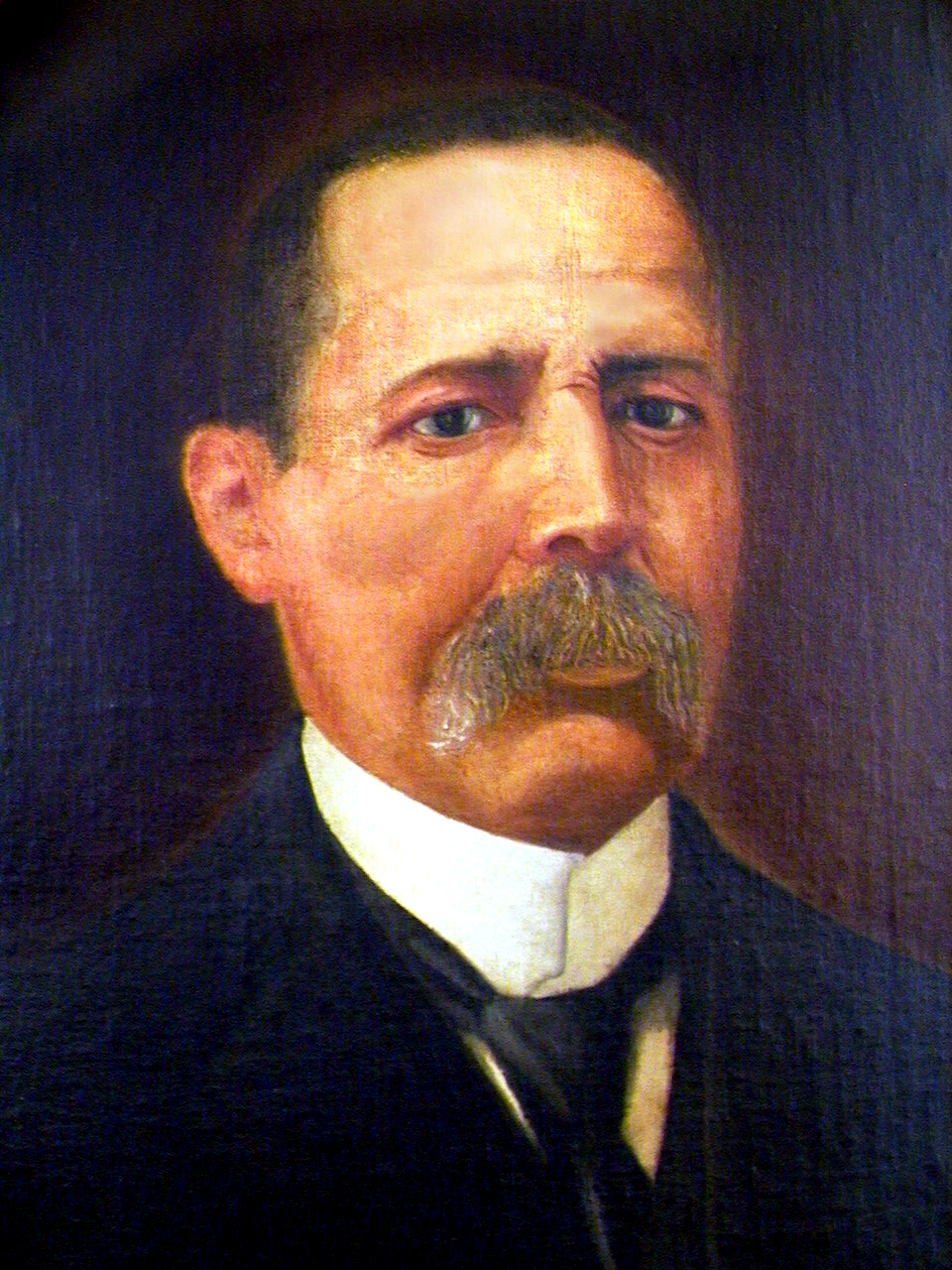

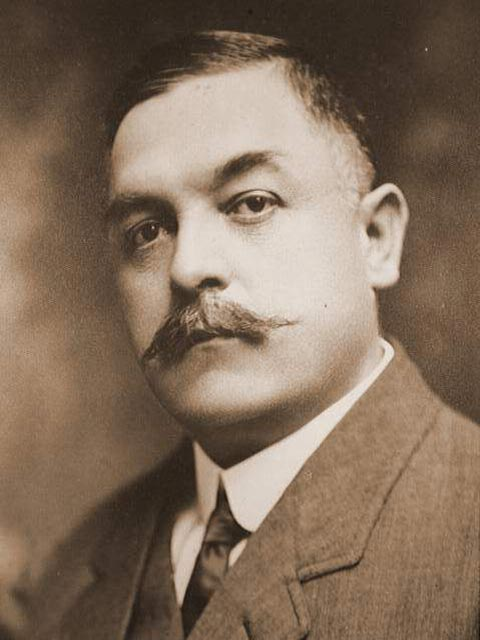
Nominee	Ascensión Esquivel Ibarra	Máximo Fernández Alvarado
Party	PUN	Republican Club
Electoral vote	606	164
Popular vote	13,475	5,697
Percentage	70.18%	29.67%
- Official results by province (Note: First round official results are available by province and county, except for Alajuela and Cartago, where the data has not been preserved.)
President before election
Rafael Yglesias Castro
Civil
Elected President
Ascensión Esquivel Ibarra
PUN
- Parliamentary election
- 17 of the 32 seats in the Constitutional Congress
Party	Leader	Seats	+/–
PUN	Ascensión Esquivel Ibarra	13	New
Republican Club	Máximo Fernández Alvarado	4	New
This lists parties that won seats. See the complete results below.

General elections were held in Costa Rica on 16 February 1902. The elections took place in a context of heightened political tension. President Rafael Yglesias's administration, which had been marked by authoritarian tendencies, faced increasing opposition after his controversial re-election in 1897. That earlier victory had been secured through a constitutional reform widely considered undemocratic, as Yglesias ran unopposed and maintained full control of Congress.

The liberal Republican Party, which had boycotted the 1897 election in protest, emerged as the main opposition force. By the early 1900s, political polarization in the country had deepened, and the possibility of civil conflict loomed. However, a negotiated settlement was reached between Yglesias and the moderate wing of the Republican Party, resulting in a political agreement known as La Transacción ("the Transaction"). This pact allowed for a peaceful transition of power and set the stage for a more competitive and inclusive electoral process in 1902.

The election was contested by two candidates. Ascensión Esquivel Ibarra, representing the newly established National Union Party, was nominated with the backing of President Rafael Yglesias. The party itself was formed as an electoral alliance between the ruling Civil Party and a moderate faction of the Republican Party, as part of the political compromise. Opposing him was Máximo Fernández Alvarado, who ran under the banner of the "Republican Club", representing a more independent and uncompromising Republican position that did not align with the leadership involved in the agreement.

Both candidates identified with liberal political ideologies, the dominant ideological consensus of the period. Esquivel won the election by a landslide, consolidating the negotiated transition of power.

== Background ==
Rafael Yglesias Castro was first elected president in 1894 and re-elected without opposition in 1897 for a second term. As the 1871 Constitution barred him from seeking another consecutive term, Yglesias began discussions with key political leaders in the opposition to agree on a mutually acceptable successor. While he could no longer remain in office, he sought to influence the choice of his successor in favor of someone he respected and trusted.

Amid these negotiations, Yglesias submitted a motion to the Constitutional Congress to convene a National Constituent Assembly. By raising the possibility of constitutional reform, he may have created an implicit deterrent, knowing that his opponents would prefer to accept a president of his choosing rather than risk amendments that might allow him to extend his time in office.

On 10 August 1901, Yglesias sent a letter to former Foreign Minister Cleto González Víquez, a leading figure in the opposition, proposing a political compromise. The plan involved withdrawing the pending constitutional reform project, issuing an official decree calling for general elections, and creating a bipartisan commission of five delegates from each party to agree on a consensus presidential candidate. If no consensus could be reached, a single name would be proposed for consideration. If that too failed, all commitments would be void. The proposal, later known as La Transacción ("the Transaction"), was also sent to other leaders of the Republican Party, including Ricardo Jiménez Oreamuno, Manuel de Jesús Jiménez Oreamuno, and Tobías Zúñiga Castro, all of whom accepted the terms.

The commission met on 14 September in the presidential office. The Republican Party was represented by José Durán, Salvador Lara, Nicolás Oreamuno, Tranquilino Sáenz, and Ramón Cabezas, while the Civil Party sent Joaquín Aguilar, Moisés Castro, Pedro Zumbado, Procopio Arana, and Rodolfo Alvarado. The Republicans proposed González Víquez as their candidate, but he was rejected. In turn, the Civil Party put forward jurist Octavio Béeche Argüello, who was also declined.

With no agreement reached, the decision fell to President Yglesias, who nominated Ascensión Esquivel Ibarra, a private lawyer, academic, and former member of the intellectual circle El Olimpo (Olympus Generation), as well as his partisan rival in the 1889 elections. While the choice surprised the Republican delegates, it was less unexpected for the Civil Party. Esquivel had previously been selected by Congress as Third Designate to the Presidency during the second Yglesias administration and, in 1895, had served alongside González Víquez and Jiménez Oreamuno on a government-appointed committee tasked with drafting new criminal, criminal procedure, and commercial codes, which were never enacted at the time. In 1896, Esquivel had also been appointed Minister Plenipotentiary to resolve a border dispute with the Colombian government under Miguel Antonio Caro concerning the Fernández-Holguín Treaty of 1886.

Once both parties approved Esquivel’s candidacy, they founded the National Union Party (Partido Unión Nacional), an electoral alliance incorporating members from the Republican and Civil parties, whose supporters became known as nacionalistas (“nationalists”). However, a dissident faction of the Republican Party rejected the Transaction and nominated former Secretary of the Interior Máximo Fernández Alvarado as their own candidate at an event held in Heredia on 8 November 1901. His supporters became known as fernandistas (“fernandists”) or neo-republicanos ("new republicans".

== Campaign ==
One of the issues debated during the campaign was the Nicaraguan nationality of the National Union Party candidate, lawyer Ascensión Esquivel Ibarra. His opponents argued that this constituted a legal impediment to his presidency, as Article 96 of the Constitution in force at the time required presidential candidates to be "Costa Rican by birth." Esquivel, however, had previously exercised presidential authority as Second Designate to the Presidency during the “Hundred Days Government” from May to August 1889, in the temporary absence of President Bernardo Soto Alfaro. Although serving as Third Designate under Yglesias at the time of the election, he had not assumed the presidency during that term.

Republicans who supported Máximo Fernández strongly criticized President Rafael Yglesias for granting himself the power to select a presidential candidate and for the opposition’s acceptance and legitimization of that candidate. Both factions fielded their own parliamentary candidates, with the National Union drawing support from both Republican and Civil Party members as their own.

== Results ==
In the first round, President Yglesias did not run in accordance with the Transaction, although some electors pledged their support to him personally rather than to Ascensión Esquivel.

In the second round, of the 636 combined electors backing either Esquivel or Yglesias, 606 voted for Esquivel and 30 for Máximo Fernández.

Candidate	Party	Popular vote		Electoral College first round		Electoral College second round	
Candidate	Party	Votes	%	Votes	%	Votes	%
Ascensión Esquivel Ibarra	National Union Party	13,475	70.18	549	71.30	606	78.70
Máximo Fernández Alvarado	Republican Club	5,697	29.67	134	17.40	164	21.30
Rafael Yglesias Castro	Civil Party	29	0.15	87	11.30		
Total		19,201	100.00	770	100.00	770	100.00
Source: TSE, Molina, Salazar (Note: Popular vote totals exclude results from Alajuela and Cartago, meaning the recorded figures represent only a portion of the actual national vote share.) (Note: Detailed popular vote results for Alajuela Province have remained unavailable. For Cartago Province, only the total number of votes is known, without breakdown by party.)

=== First round results by province ===
Province	Esquivel	Fernández	Yglesias^{1}
San José Province	204	30	-
Alajuela	132	63	-
Cartago Province	90	12	15
Heredia	60	29	-
Guanacaste	3	-	72
Puntarenas	33	-	-
Limón	27	-	-
Total	549	134	87
Source: Salazar

=== Second round results by province ===
Province	Esquivel	Fernández
San José Province	199	42
Alajuela	120	70
Cartago Province	96	12
Heredia	59	40
Guanacaste	69	-
Puntarenas	36	-
Limón	27	-
Total	606	164
Source: TSE

=== Parliament ===
Party	Seats	+/–
National Union Party	13	New
Republican Club	4	New
Total	17	–
Source: Ocontrillo, El Día

== Aftermath ==
On 2 May 1902, the Constitutional Congress appointed new vice-presidential designates: outgoing president Rafael Yglesias as First Designate, Cleto González Víquez as Second Designate, and Juan Bautista Quirós Segura as Third Designate, reflecting the representation of both factions that had merged into the alliance.

In his inaugural address, Esquivel declared that his government would “listen attentively to all expressions of public opinion, and first and foremost to any criticism leveled against it, in order to take advantage of any salutary advice, if any, or to ignore any insults, should they arise.” He further stated that he would seek “the cooperation of good patriots and men of merit, regardless of political affiliation,” and expressed the hope of gaining the “enlightened and patriotic support” of the nation. Following the presidential inauguration, González Víquez was also appointed as Secretary of Finance and Commerce in the cabinet.
