= 1894 Costa Rican general election =

- 4–6 February 1894 (popular vote); 1 April 1894 (electoral college)
- Presidential election

564 members of the Electoral College (Note: Out of the 663 electors chosen in the first round, only 564 took part in the second round.) 283 votes needed to win
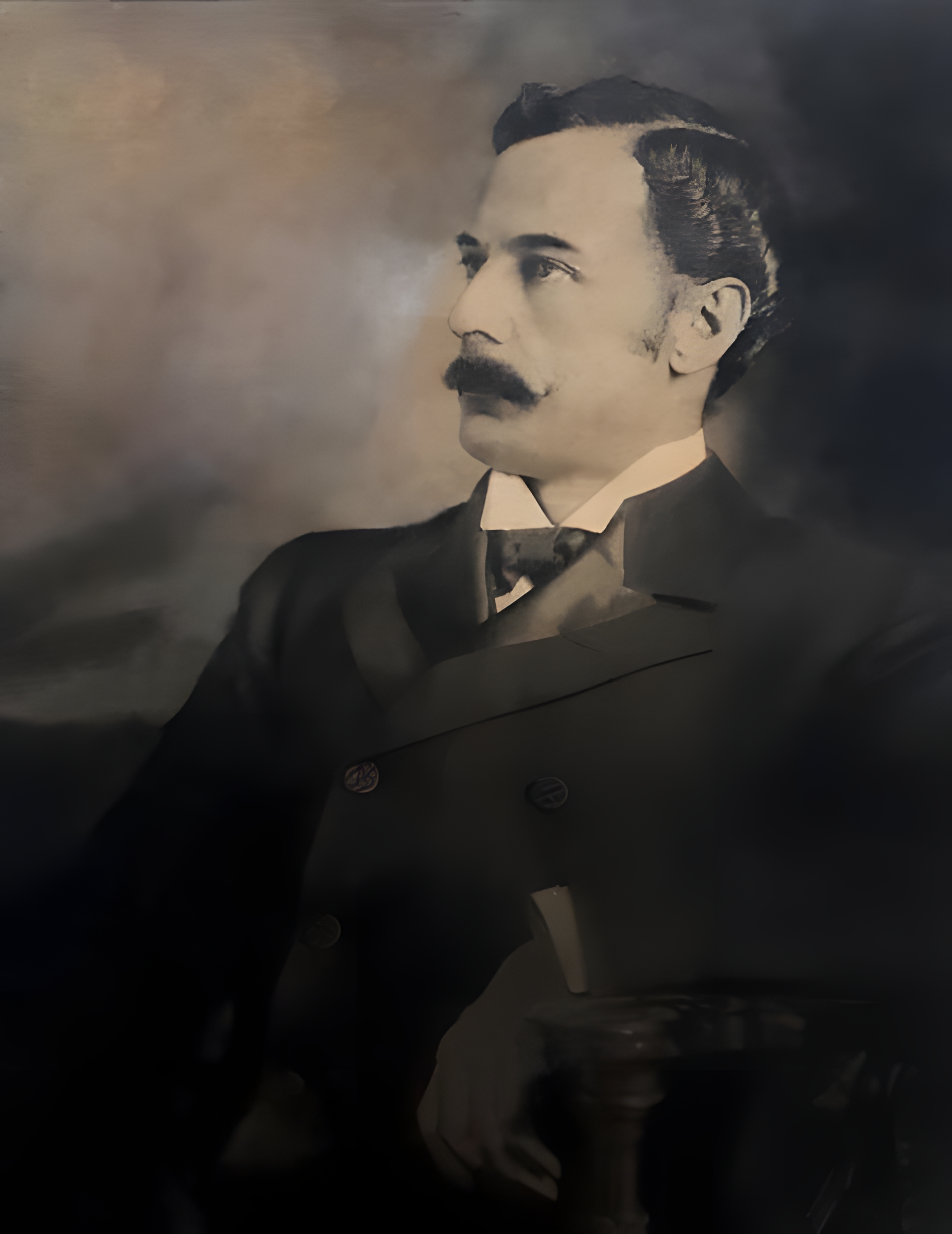

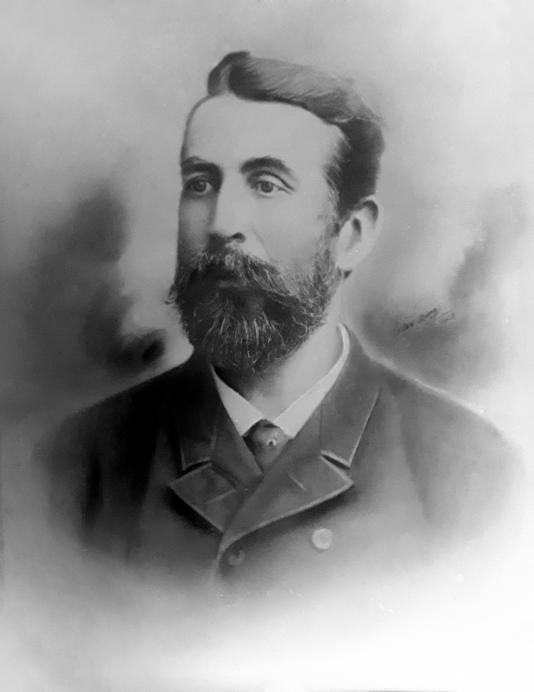

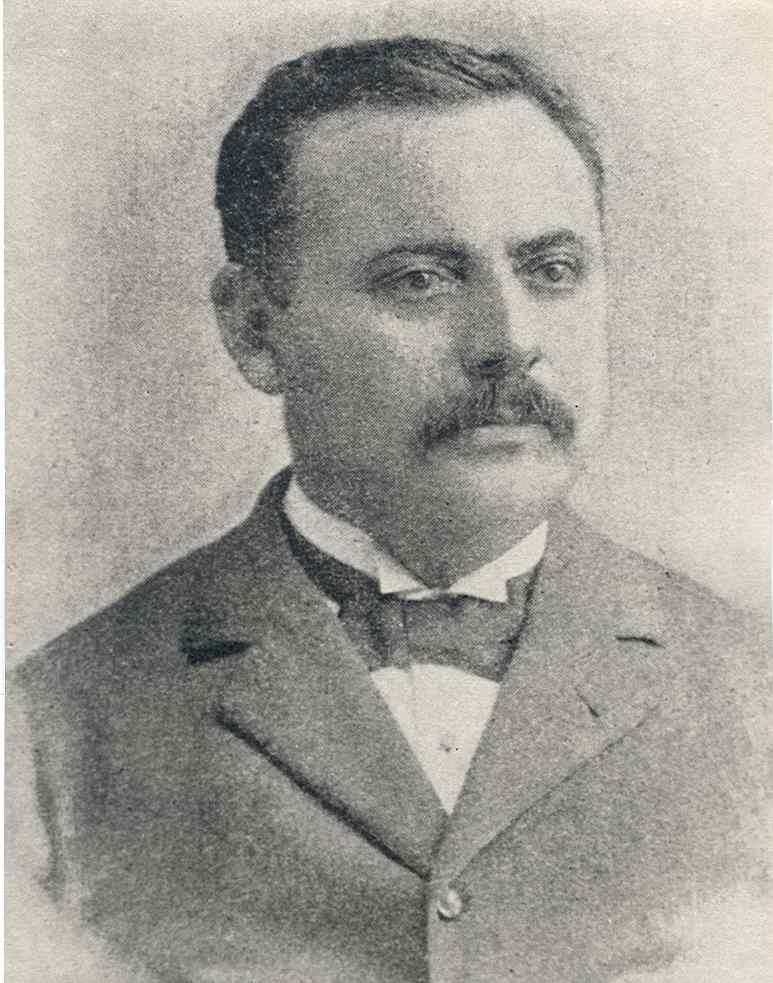
Nominee	Rafael Yglesias Castro	Juan José Flores Umaña	Félix Arcadio Montero Monge
Party	Civil	PP	PID
Alliance		Catholic Union
Electoral vote	298	189	62
Percentage	52.84%	33.51%	10.99%
- Estimated results by province
President before election
José Joaquín Rodríguez
Independent
Elected President
Rafael Yglesias Castro
Civil
- Legislative election
- All 32 seats in the Constitutional Congress; 17 seats needed for a majority
Party	Leader	Seats	+/–
Civil	Rafael Yglesias Castro	20	New
UC–PP	José Gregorio Trejos Gutiérrez	9	New
Agricultural	Fadrique Gutiérrez	2	New
PID	Félix Arcadio Montero Monge	1	New
This lists parties that won seats. See the complete results below.

General elections were held in Costa Rica in 1894 to elect the president and all members of the Constitutional Congress. Voters elected members of the electoral college on 4, 5 and 6 February, who in turn elected the president on 1 April.

The elections were marked by controversy, amid allegations of irregularities and abuses of power by the outgoing administration of President José Joaquín Rodríguez Zeledón. The government supported the candidacy of Rafael Yglesias Castro, Rodríguez’s son-in-law, and was accused by contemporaries and later observers of employing coercive measures to secure his victory, including the arrest of his principal opponent, José Gregorio Trejos Gutiérrez.

== Background ==
In the previous general election, José Joaquín Rodríguez Zeledón had secured the presidency with the support of the Catholic Church and previously marginalized conservative sectors, defeating the liberal and Freemason candidate Ascensión Esquivel Ibarra. The initial attempts by the outgoing liberal government of Bernardo Soto Alfaro to reject the results and install Esquivel nonetheless nearly provoked a Catholic uprising. Rodríguez was ultimately recognized as the democratically elected president and was sworn into office on 8 May 1890 as per the 1871 Constitution. During his term, however, his government departed from several of the principles that had facilitated his rise to power.

Although initially allied with the Catholic Church, Rodríguez later severed political ties with it. Following the 1892 midterm elections, he dissolved the Constitutional Congress in August of that year, a move widely regarded as unconstitutional, and governed by decree for the remainder of his term, during which political opponents were arrested.

In advance of the election, Rodríguez decreed the restoration of constitutional rights and freedoms that had been suspended in 1892, along with a general amnesty for most individuals imprisoned for opposing his government. On 14 November, he formally called for general elections to be held in February and April 1894.

After José Joaquín Rodríguez’s election, his political organization, the Constitutional Democratic Party, had fractured in 1890 into two new parties. One was the Catholic Union, an ultraconservative, anti-Masonic party led by the German-born bishop of Costa Rica, Bernhard August Thiel, which on 22 September nominated veteran jurist José Gregorio Trejos as its presidential candidate. The other was the Civil Party, a loosely liberal organization established in November 1893 and led by Rodríguez’s son-in-law, Rafael Yglesias Castro, who was selected as its candidate. While not explicitly anti-clerical, the Civil Party opposed the direct involvement of the Catholic Church in active political life.

== Electoral system ==
The election was conducted under an electoral law enacted by decree by President José Joaquín Rodríguez on 11 November 1893, which replaced the legislation in force since 1889. Under this framework, control of the electoral process was concentrated in the Executive Branch, particularly in the president and the Secretary of the Interior and Police. Provincial electoral boards were appointed by the executive and presided over by the respective provincial governors. These boards oversaw the vote count and appointed cantonal boards, which were chaired by the political chiefs and, in turn, designated district boards responsible for compiling voter registers.

The electoral process followed a two-stage system of indirect voting. In the first stage, eligible male citizens voted publicly to select second-degree electors. In the second stage, these electors chose the president by secret ballot. Eligibility to serve as an elector generally required property ownership and literacy, which meant that electors were drawn primarily from wealthier sectors and the middle class.

The same body of electors also selected the deputies to the Constitutional Congress for four-year terms. Electoral assemblies were held in the capital city of each province and were presided over by the provincial governor, who was appointed by the president. For the 1894 election, 720 electors were to be chosen nationwide. However, only 663 were elected, and 99 of those did not ultimately participate in the second round of voting.

== Campaign ==
From the outset of the campaign, the Catholic Union emerged as the principal opposition force and nominated veteran jurist José Gregorio Trejos Gutiérrez. Within the liberal camp, divisions led to multiple candidacies, with some factions nominating former foreign minister Manuel de Jesús Jiménez Oreamuno and others supporting former interim president Carlos Durán Cartín.

Two additional parties also contested the election but played a more limited role. The Independent Democratic Party, led by former deputy Félix Arcadio Montero Monge, and the Agricultural Party, which nominated Colonel Fadrique Gutiérrez, a sculptor from Heredia, attracted relatively modest support. The People’s Party, representing sectors associated with the coffee oligarchy and the Olympus Generation, nominated physician Juan José Flores Umaña.

In light of the Catholic Union’s electoral strength, several prominent political figures called for the unification of its opponents, and Durán ultimately allied with Jiménez. By this stage of the campaign, the Civil Party had already been formed, nominating Rafael Yglesias Castro. Its emergence further fragmented the liberal movement, indirectly benefiting the Catholic Union and prompting criticism of the Civil Party from segments of the liberal press and leadership.

During the campaign, the Rodríguez administration was accused of exerting pressure on the electoral process in favor of Yglesias, including influencing the electoral college by discouraging electors aligned with the Catholic Union from participating in the second round of voting. Following the arrest of José Gregorio Trejos by the government, both clerical and liberal factions endorsed Juan José Flores for the second round in an unexpected alliance. In spite of the efforts, the Civil Party secured a majority of the electoral votes cast.

Following Yglesias’s victory, Article 36 of the Constitution was amended in July 1895 to prohibit political propaganda carried out, in any form, by clergy or laypersons invoking religious motives or exploiting religious beliefs. This amendment had the effect of banning religious-based political activity and rendered the Catholic Union illegal, thereby removing the principal opposition party.

== Results ==
Contemporary newspaper reports provided differing figures for the allocation of electors in the first round. According to La Prensa Libre, 318 electors were pledged to José Gregorio Trejos and 180 to Rafael Yglesias, while El Heraldo reported 321 for Trejos and 190 for Yglesias.

Although the precise distribution of the popular vote has not been conclusively established by later studies, available evidence indicates that the Catholic Union received more than half of the votes cast nationwide in the first round, as well as the largest number of electors. An 1897 retrospective editorial published in the official gazette reported that a total of 28,739 votes were cast in the election. Based on the 1892 census, a later study estimated the number of eligible registered male voters at 57,614, yielding an approximate voter turnout of 49.88%.

Candidate	Party	Votes	%
Rafael Yglesias Castro	Civil Party	298	52.84
José Gregorio Trejos Gutiérrez	Catholic Union	189	33.51
Félix Arcadio Montero Monge	Independent Democratic Party	62	10.99
Fadrique Gutiérrez	Agricultural Party	15	2.66
Total		564	100.00
Registered voters/turnout		720	–
Source: TSE

=== Second round results by province ===
Province	Yglesias	Flores	Montero	Gutiérrez
San José Province	52	86	29	-
Alajuela	117	5	9	-
Cartago Province	11	54	14	-
Heredia	45	19	6	-
Guanacaste	57	9	-	-
Puntarenas	3	15	-	15
Limón	13	1	4	-
Total	298	189	62	15
Source: TSE

=== Constitutional Congress ===
Party	Seats	+/–
Civil Party	20	New
Catholic Union Party–People's Party	9	New
Agricultural Party	2	New
Independent Democratic Party	1	New
Total	32	–
Source: Calvo
