= 1910 Costa Rican general election =

- 29–30 August 1909 (popular vote); 7 April 1910 (electoral college)
- Presidential election

864 members of the Electoral College 433 votes needed to win
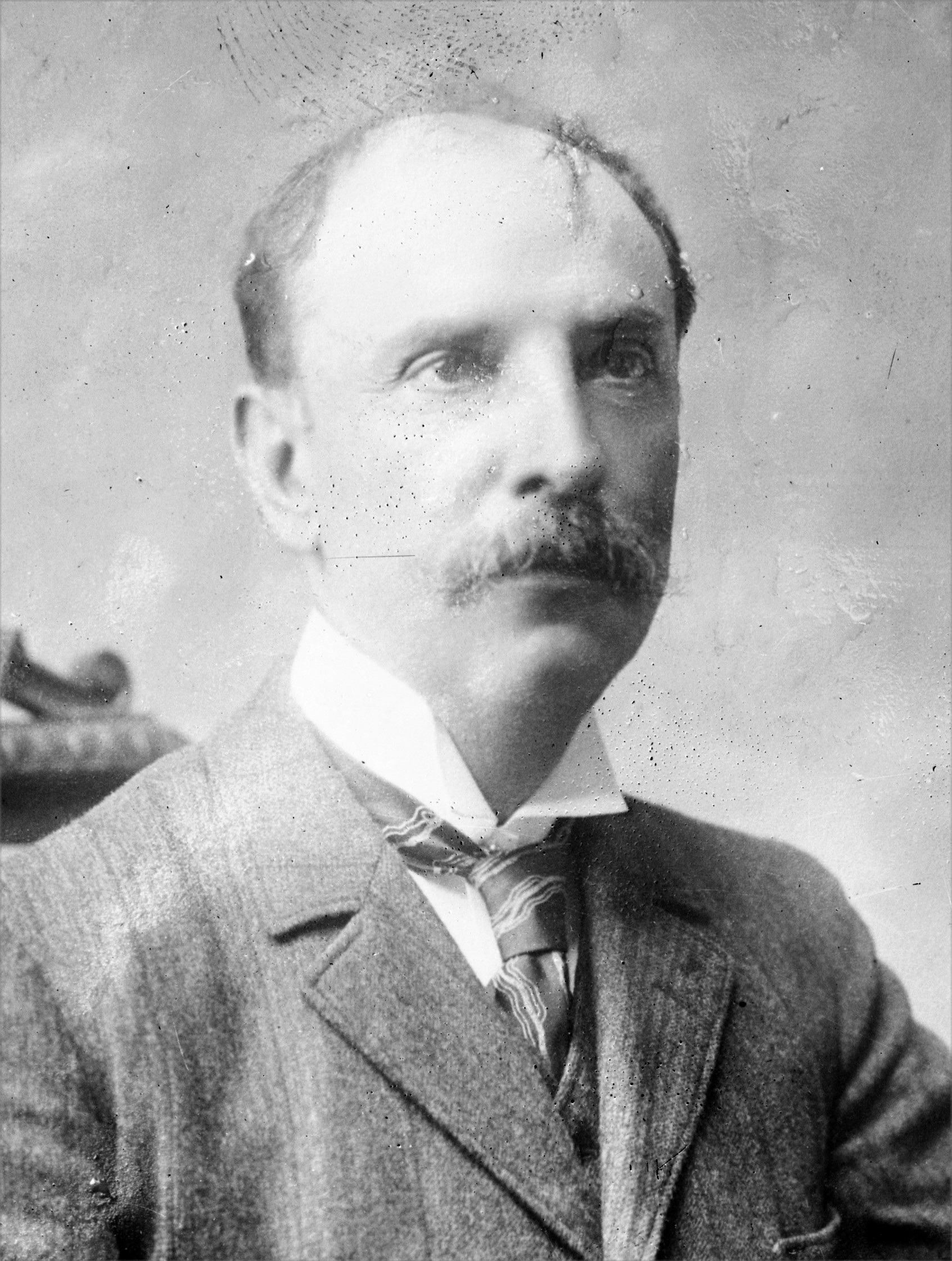

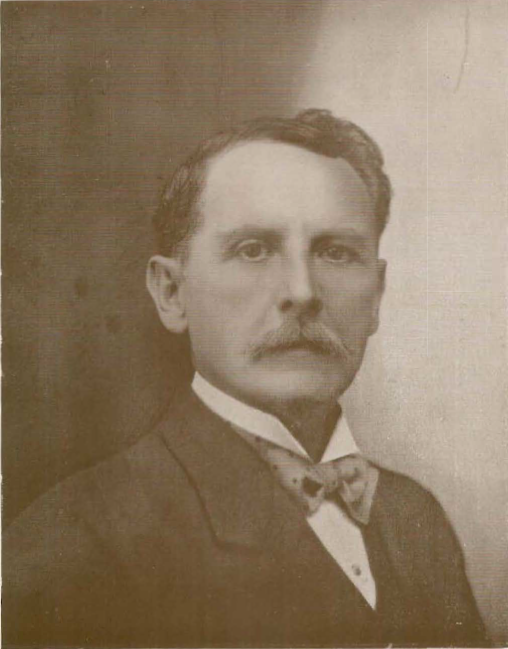
Nominee	Ricardo Jiménez Oreamuno	Rafael Yglesias Castro
Party	Republican	Civil
Electoral vote	828	36
Popular vote	39,023	15,729
Percentage	71.27%	28.73%
- Official results by province
President before election
Cleto González Víquez
National
Elected President
Ricardo Jiménez Oreamuno
Republican
- Legislative election
- 20 of the 43 seats in the Constitutional Congress
Party	Leader	Seats
Republican	Ricardo Jiménez Oreamuno	19
Civil	Rafael Yglesias Castro	1
This lists parties that won seats. See the complete results below.
Results by province

General elections were held in Costa Rica on 7 April 1910. Republican Party nominee Ricardo Jiménez Oreamuno defeated former president Rafael Yglesias Castro of the Civil Party in a landslide. Yglesias had previously governed from 1894 to 1902, a period often characterized as authoritarian.

In the concurrent parliamentary elections, the Republican Party won all but one of the 20 contested seats, securing a combined two-thirds supermajority in the Constitutional Congress, divided into Jimenistas, Fernandistas and Neutrales. The Jimenista faction within the party held a majority on its own, while the opposition Civil Party retained only four seats overall.

== Background ==
Ricardo Jiménez Oreamuno had previously held several public offices. He served as Secretary of Foreign Affairs from 1889 to 1890 in the transitional government of Carlos Durán Cartín and later as president of the Supreme Court of Justice in 1892. He was first elected to the Constitutional Congress in 1902 as a member of the National Union Party list and was re-elected in 1906.

Jiménez later became a prominent critic of the policies adopted by the administration of President Cleto González Víquez, and initially built his political profile through sustained opposition to the influence of large foreign companies in Costa Rica. In 1907, he had gained national attention for leading a campaign against the United Fruit Company and for opposing contracts involving the Costa Rica Railroad Company and the Northern Railway Company, which he denounced as compromising national sovereignty. His positions contributed to the emergence of a loyal political following, known as Jimenismo.

Jiménez’s growing popularity increasingly eclipsed that of Máximo Fernández Alvarado, who had led the Republican Party since 1901. In late 1908, Fernández circulated a letter among senior party members recommending Jiménez as the party’s presidential candidate in his place. The decision generated contemporary debate regarding its motivations. Jiménez was formally nominated at the Teatro Variedades in San José during the first Republican National Convention, held on 24 January 1909, at which Fernández was re-elected as party leader.

== Campaign ==
On 13 February 1909, La Tribuna, at the time the official newspaper of the Civil Party (Civilistas), proclaimed the candidacy of former president Rafael Yglesias Castro, marking the formal beginning of the electoral campaign. Initially, the contest was limited to Jiménez and Yglesias. Despite the earlier Pact of La Transacción, which had facilitated the election of Ascensión Esquivel in the 1902 general election through an agreement between the Yglesias government and Olmpus factions within the Republican Party, Jiménez and Yglesias remained political adversaries.

Two weeks after the Republican National Convention, a third candidacy briefly emerged. Physician Pánfilo Valverde Carranza was nominated by a group of supporters affiliated with the National Party. His campaign was supported by the short-lived newspaper El Pueblo, first published on 28 March 1909. Lacking the backing of President González Víquez and facing the government’s refusal to endorse his candidacy, Valverde soon withdrew from the race.

The governing National Party did not nominate an official presidential candidate, and the González Víquez administration maintained a position of formal neutrality. The president issued instructions to the military affirming their right to vote freely while prohibiting armed attendance at polling stations.

== Results ==
Candidate	Party	Popular vote		Electoral College	
Candidate	Party	Votes	%	Votes	%
Ricardo Jiménez Oreamuno	Republican Party	39,023	71.27	828	95.83
Rafael Yglesias Castro	Civil Party	15,729	28.73	36	4.17
Total		54,752	100.00	864	100.00
Source: TSE, Salazar

=== First round by province ===
Province	Jiménez %	Yglesias %
San José Province	76.62	23.38
Alajuela	62.93	37.07
Cartago Province	91.72	8.28
Heredia	73.40	26.60
Guanacaste	55.21	44.79
Puntarenas	64.62	35.38
Limón	26.41	73.59
Total	71.21	28.78
Source: Salazar

=== Second round by province ===
Province	Jiménez	Yglesias
San José Province	294	-
Alajuela	201	3
Cartago Province	138	-
Heredia	105	-
Guanacaste	42	33
Puntarenas	44	-
Limón	4	0
Total	828	36
Source: TSE
