= Civil Party (Costa Rica) =

Defunct political party in Costa Rica

Civil Party Partido Civil
- Leader: Rafael Iglesias Castro
- Founded: November 1893
- Dissolved: 27 January 1917 (de facto)
- Preceded by: Constitutional Democratic Party (Not legal predecessor)
- Headquarters: San José
- Newspaper: El Reeleccionista (1897-1898); La Tribuna (1909-1910); Regeneración (1913); Pabellón Rojo (1913-1914)
- Ideology: Secularism; Economic liberalism; Social conservatism; Populism
- Political position: Centre-right
- Colours: Red

Party flag

The Civil Party (Spanish: Partido Civil) was a Costa Rican political party active between 1893 and 1917. Closely associated with the leadership of Rafael Iglesias Castro, the party played a central role in national politics during the 1890s, governing the country through his presidency from 1894 to 1902 and shaping state policy during a period of political consolidation.

Personalist in character, the Civil Party promoted a broadly liberal political orientation that emphasized state authority, economic modernization, the combat of vagrancy and vice, and limits on clerical political influence, while lacking a fixed ideological platform. Although it declined after Iglesias's departure from office and failed electoral attempts in the early 20th century, civilismo remained influential in Costa Rican political culture until the death of Iglesias in 1924.

== History ==
On 13 September 1893, President José Joaquín Rodríguez Zeledón decreed the restoration of constitutional rights and freedoms, along with a general amnesty for individuals imprisoned for opposing his government. On 14 November, he called for general elections to be held in February and April 1894. Amid divisions within the country's liberal movement, a group of government-aligned liberals organized within a few months to form a new political faction known as the Civil Party. The party's activities expanded nationwide and drew support primarily from public employees and government officials, positioning it in opposition to the conservative Catholic Union Party.

Initially, the party operated without formally nominating a presidential candidate. It later selected Rafael Iglesias Castro, then 32 years old and serving as Secretary of War and Navy, as its candidate. Iglesias was also the son-in-law of President Rodríguez, who formally remained neutral during the campaign. The party's founding meetings were held at Iglesias's residence in the Catedral district of San José. Attendees included deputies Joaquín Aguilar and José Carlos Sáenz Esquivel, as well as businessman Pantaleón Córdoba.

Party leaders chose Iglesias based on his leadership profile and prior political experience, including his role during the 1889 electoral crisis and his service in government. Despite concerns that his candidacy could be politically divisive, Iglesias won the presidency through the electoral college system in the second round of voting.

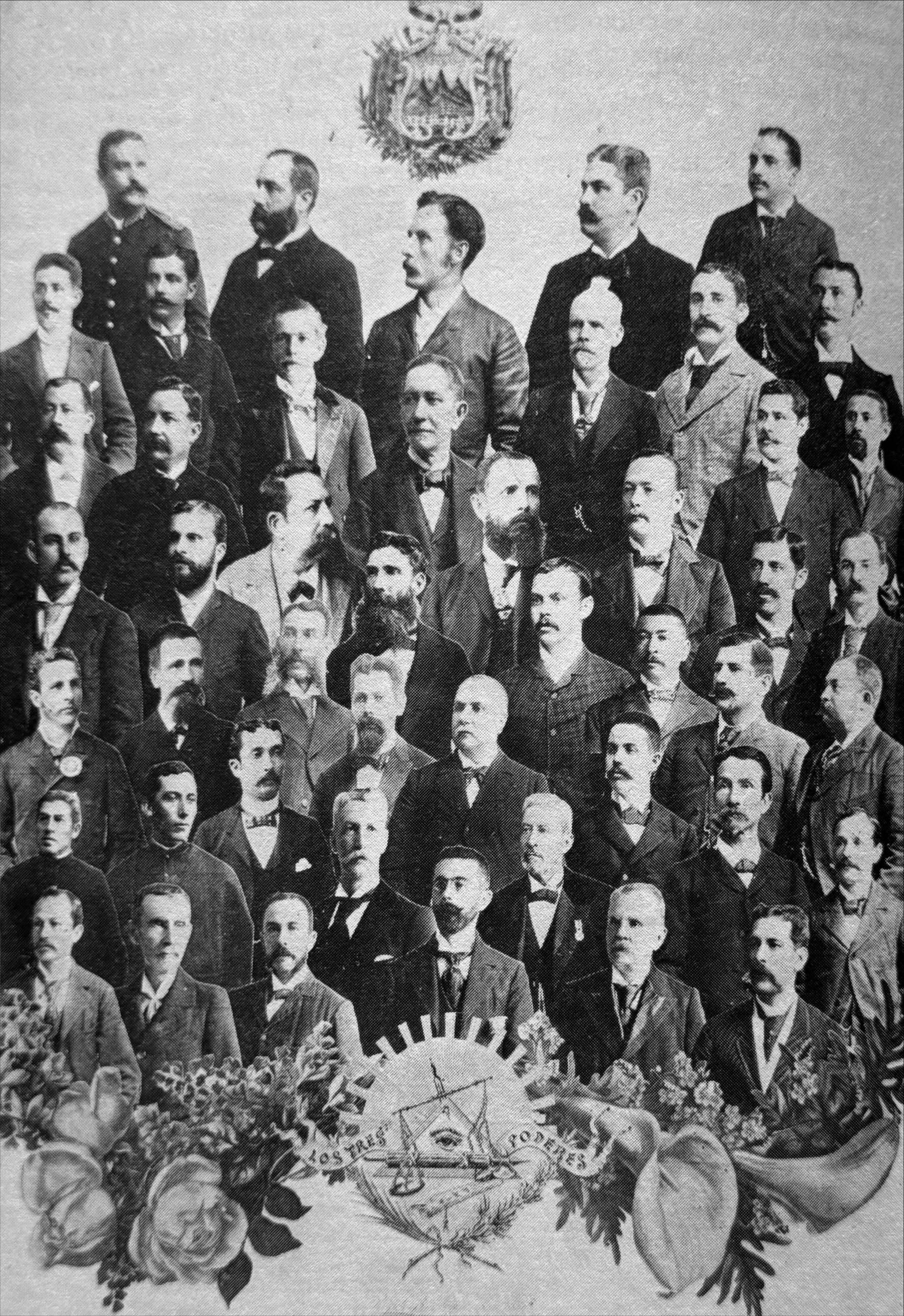
Political officeholders during the Iglesias Administration.

Following the election, the party participated in the 1896 midterms for the partial renewal of the Constitutional Congress. Public interest in these elections was limited, largely due to Iglesias's political background and the authoritarian nature of his government, which reduced voter engagement and opposition activity. The Civil Party won six seats, while the Catholic Union and the Independent Democratic Party each secured one seat.

In the 1897 presidential election, the Civil Party supported the re-election of Iglesias. Opposition parties abstained from participating in that contest, resulting in his unopposed re-election. After the election, the civilista-dominated Congress selected Demetrio Iglesias Llorente, Juan Bautista Quirós Segura, and Federico Tinoco Iglesias as Designates to the Presidency.

In the 1902 presidential election, the Civil Party did not nominate an official candidate. Instead, it endorsed Ascensión Esquivel Ibarra through a political agreement known as La Transacción.

In the 1910 and 1913 elections, the Civil Party returned to national politics by once again nominating Iglesias, seeking to reassert its influence after more than a decade outside of power. The latter was contested amid a fragmented political landscape and widespread public fatigue with civilista rule, and Iglesias failed to secure sufficient support. No candidate obtained an absolute majority, and the decision was ultimately resolved by the Constitutional Congress, which elected Republican deputy Alfredo González Flores as president, a decision Iglesias permanently resented. During the 1913 campaign, the Civil Party's slogan had been Moral, paz y trabajo ("Morality, peace and labor").

Following the coup d’état of 1917 led by General Federico Tinoco Granados—who had previously been a Republican Party member and minister in the government of Alfredo González Flores—Iglesias supported the overthrow, as did much of the political elite at the time, partly due to González Flores's unpopularity stemming from his economic reforms. Iglesias participated alongside other former presidents on the committee appointed by Tinoco to draft the Constitution of 1917 and undertook specific diplomatic missions on behalf of the regime.

After the fall of the Tinoco dictatorship, Iglesias permanently withdrew from national politics. He declined presidential nominations in 1919 and 1923. In 1923, he was proposed as a candidate by the newly founded Agricultural Party—formed by leaders and supporters of the pre-Tinoco National Union and Civil parties, among other factions—but ultimately endorsed its leader, Alberto Echandi Montero.

With Iglesias's death in April 1924, civilismo effectively ceased to function as a significant political current in Costa Rica.

== Ideology and platform ==
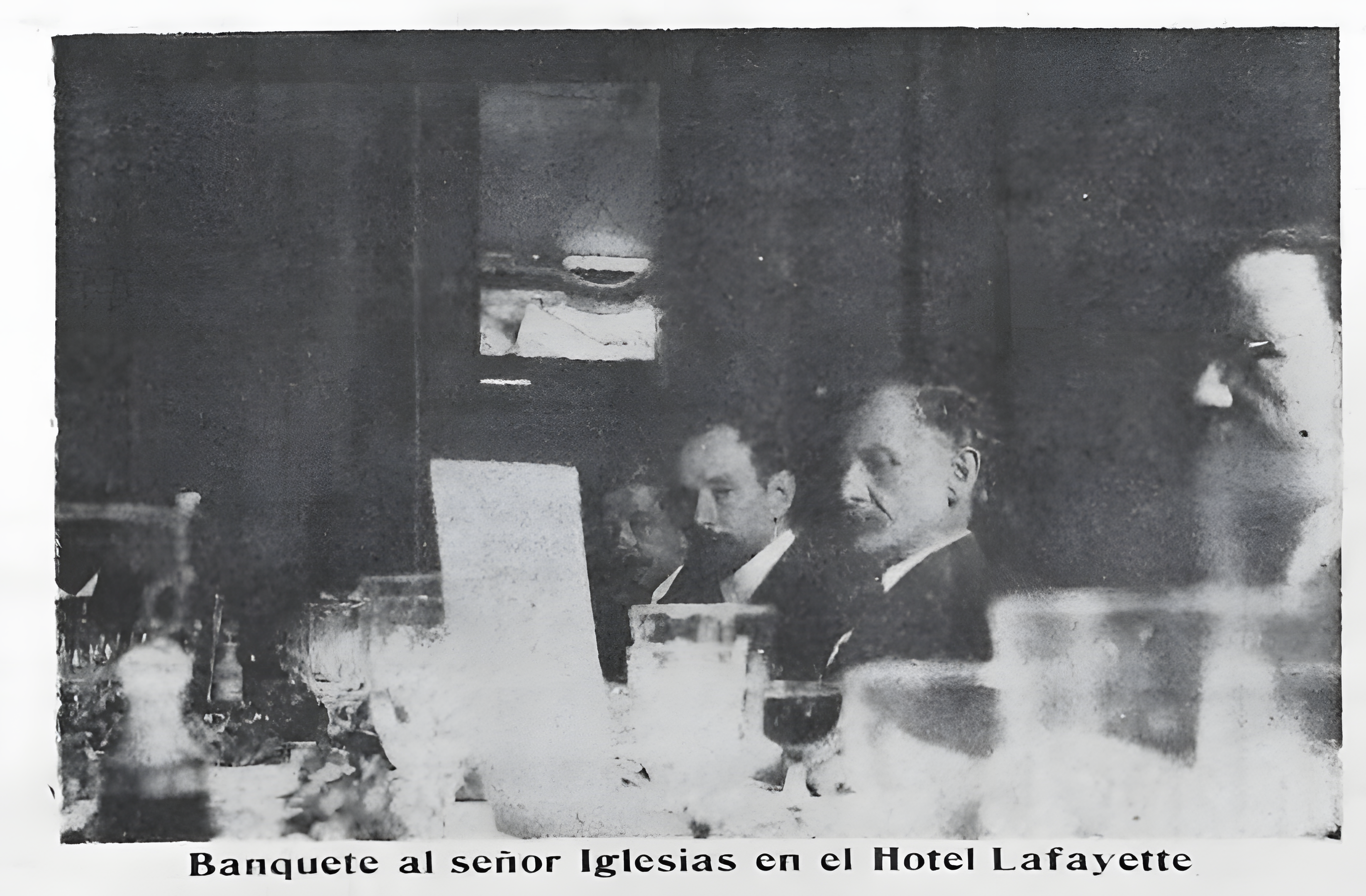
Campaign banquet offered to Iglesias in 1913 at the Hotel Lafayette in Cartago.

The Civil Party was largely personalist in character, centered on the leadership and political influence of Rafael Iglesias Castro. Its supporters were commonly known as civilistas. While the party incorporated elements of liberalism and populism, it lacked a clearly defined or internally consistent ideological doctrine.

Civilismo as a complex and evolving political orientation that was broadly liberal but adapted to shifting political circumstances and priorities. In matters concerning religion and the state, Iglesias—himself a Catholic—did not espouse an explicitly anti-Catholic or anti-clerical position. Instead, his liberalism emphasized limiting the institutional role of the Catholic Church in domestic political affairs, particularly opposing the significant political influence exercised by the clergy under the leadership of Bishop Bernhard August Thiel.

During its initial phase, the party's 1894 election campaign focused primarily on countering the Catholic Union Party rather than articulating a detailed policy platform. The Civil Party drew support from liberal sectors aligned with the administration of President José Joaquín Rodríguez Zeledón, including state employees and government officials who opposed clerical participation in politics.

The party's program for the 1897 general election emphasized continuity with the policies pursued during Iglesias's first term in office. Central elements included the adoption of the gold standard to attract capital and stabilize the economy, along with efforts to reduce both internal and external public debt. The platform supported the development of new industries and the free cultivation of tobacco. It also stressed the maintenance of public order and social stability, the promotion and protection of primary, secondary, and vocational education—an area influenced by positivist and Krausist thought—as well as encouragement of the fine arts and initiatives to combat social vices. The two principal projects highlighted were the end of the construction of a railroad to the Pacific coast and comprehensive monetary reform.

The party's political programs for the 1910 and 1913 elections were largely identical. In the areas of industry and labor, the platform adopted a protectionist stance limited to domestic industries with sufficient capital investment and access to national raw materials. Foreign investment was supported insofar as it did not threaten the viability of existing domestic enterprises. Overall, the proposals reflected a form of moderate liberalism that allowed for state monopolies in economic sectors deemed strategically important.

In labor and social policy, the party advocated measures aimed at social improvement and moral reform. These included the construction of hygienic public bathing facilities intended to address public health concerns and reduce prostitution and vice; the establishment of schools of arts, crafts, and manual labor; the creation of adult education schools to supplement practical knowledge acquired through work; and the creation of correctional institutions for minors as a means of preventing juvenile delinquency and social marginalization.

== Election results ==
=== Presidential elections ===
Election	Candidate	# votes	% vote	Result	Note
1894	Rafael Iglesias Castro	Unknown	Unknown	✓ Elected	
1897	Rafael Iglesias Castro	Unknown	Unknown	✓ Elected	
1902	Ascensión Esquivel Ibarra	13,475	70.18	✓ Elected	Coalition: National Union Party
1910	Rafael Iglesias Castro	15,729	28.73	✗ Defeated	
1913	Rafael Iglesias Castro	17,340	27.03	✗ Defeated	

=== Legislative elections ===
Election	Seats		# of seats	Position	Note
Election	votes	%	# of seats	Position	Note
1894	Indirect election		20 / 32	Government	
1897	Indirect election		17 / 17	Government	
1902	Indirect election		13 / 17	Support	Coalition: National Union Party
1910	Indirect election		1 / 20	Opposition	
1913	27,094	42.3	6 / 21	Opposition	
1915	10,690	26.2	2 / 22	Opposition	Coalition: National Union Party
