= Liberalism in Costa Rica =

Liberalism in Costa Rica is a political philosophy with a long and complex history. Liberals were the hegemonic political group for most of Costa Rica's history especially during the periods of the Free State and the First Republic, however, as the liberal model exhausted itself and new more left-wing reformist movements clashed during the Costa Rican Civil War liberalism was relegated to a secondary role after the Second Costa Rican Republic with the development of Costa Rica's Welfare State and its two-party system controlled by social-democratic and Christian democratic parties.

== Early history ==
The first victory of liberalism in the country was during the country's first civil war, the Ochomogo War in 1823 when the liberal-dominated cities of San José and Alajuela fought against the conservative-dominated cities of Heredia and Cartago due to the former's wish to split from the First Mexican Empire and becoming a Republic, whilst the Heredian and Cartaginese creole aristocracy favored to remain in the Empire as a way to protect their interests, and also as a clash of economic visions between the more liberal bourgeoisie and the agrarian aristocracy. The war between the Republicans and Imperialists was won by the Republicans and the capital was moved from Cartago to San José. Costa rica is a full democratic country as it is famous for its stable and well-functioning democracy, with periodic, accessible, and honest elections, a competitive party system, and a robust civil society. The country has a presidential system of government, with a unicameral legislature and a multi-party system.

== The Liberal State ==
Liberals will rule the country since its independence from Mexico, as almost all Presidents were liberals between 1825 and 1940 with only a few exceptions, and even during the country's membership in the Federal Republic of Central America. The dissolution of the federal entity and the full separation of the then call State of Costa Rica in 1838 saw the country under the authoritarian regime of Braulio Carrillo, who was deposed by Honduran liberal Francisco Morazán who tried to restore the Federation, but was also deposed by a coup. The constitutional reform of José María Castro Madriz in 1847 turned the country officially into a Republic.

The amount of important liberals in Costa Rica's history would be too large to list, but to mention a few this may include presidents like Juan Mora Fernández, Braulio Carrillo, José María Castro Madriz, Tomás Guardia, Juan Rafael Mora Porras (hero of the Filibuster War), Bruno Carranza Ramírez, Próspero Fernández Oreamuno, Bernardo Soto Alfaro, Cleto González Víquez, Ricardo Jiménez Oreamuno, Alfredo González Flores, Ascensión Esquivel Ibarra, Carlos Durán Cartín and Julio Acosta García, among others. Writers like Aquileo Echeverría, Manuel González Zeledón, Ricardo Fernández Guardia, Carlos Gagini and Pío Víquez. Intellectuals like Mauro Fernández Acuña, Tomás Povedano, Carlos María Ulloa, Aquiles Bigot, Rogelio Fernández Güell, Roberto Brenes Mesén, Félix Arcadio Montero Monge, Máximo Fernández and Lorenzo Montúfar, among others.

This period of dominance of the liberal ideas is known as the Liberal State of Costa Rica and encompassed between 1870 and 1940. Liberals of these times were mostly Freemasons. Freemasonry in Costa Rica was introduced in the country by Catholic priest and military chaplain Francisco Calvo in 1856 and almost all liberals were masons, to the point that the Catholic archbishop Víctor Sanabria denounced Masonry and liberalism as equal partners.

Due to the hegemony of the liberals, all de facto governments and internal factional conflicts were between them. As for example the authoritarian governments of Carrillo, Guardia and Tinoco who led coups against other liberals Manuel Aguilar Chacón, Castro Madriz and Alfredo González Flores respectively. One of the few non-liberal presidents was Vicente Herrera Zeledón in the 1876-1877 period who was conservative, but was hand-picked by Guardia and was considered his puppet. Another breaking of the liberal line happened in the 1889 Costa Rican general election when José Rodríguez Zeledón, endorsed by the Catholic Church, managed to defeat liberal Ascensión Esquivel Ibarra. Even as the government was tempted to reject the results and appoint Esquivel anyway, popular unrest made it respect the popular vote. But this victory was short-lived, as Rodríguez would break from the Church, using questionable methods to ensure the victory of his son-in-law Rafael Yglesias over the candidate of the Catholic Union in the following election.

Nevertheless, the exhaustion of the liberal model was most evident not by the actions of the conservatives but by the birth of more left-wing political movements. As a very capitalistic system in essence, social inequality and income gap started to become an issue. King of Talamanca Antonio Saldaña is murdered because of his opposition to the United Fruit Company and President Gonzalez Flores’ attempt to tax the capital causes the 1917 Costa Rican coup d'état led by Tinoco. But Tinoco's regime was short-lived. Parties like the Christian socialist Reform Party of priest Jorge Volio Jiménez (who became Vice President thanks to an alliance with progressive liberal Ricardo Jiménez Oreamuno) and the emergence of communists, socialists and anarchists groups caused uproar in the political establishment.

This may have helped the triumph of populist caudillo and Christian socialist Rafael Ángel Calderón Guardia of the National Republican Party in 1940. Calderón's alliance with the Communists and the more progressive factions of the Catholic Church allowed some of the more important social reforms in Costa Rica but also sprang protests and opposition that sparked the 1948 Civil War.

== Second Republic ==
During the war, an alliance of liberals and conservatives led by Otilio Ulate and social-democrats led by José Figueres won over the alliance of Republicans/Calderonistas and Communists. Figueres ruled de facto for 18 months then giving the presidency to Ulate and in the first election after the war, the 1953 Costa Rican general election Figueres and his newly formed party the democratic socialist National Liberation Party won over wealthy industrialist liberal Fernando Castro Cervantes (endorsed by Ulate) of the Democratic Party. Republicans and Communists were outlawed at the time.

But the Calderonismo would recover and the republican-endorsed candidate Mario Echandi won the next election approving a general amnesty for the Calderonistas and some of the Communists (although the Communist Party was constitutionally banned). After the war and due to the clear dominancy of the PLN, Ulate and Calderón left their differences aside and became allies creating the National Unification alliance that won in 1966 with José Joaquín Trejos as nominee and their political heirs with the Unity Coalition won in 1978 nominating Rodrigo Carazo.

The Unity Coalition was the alliance of four parties: Christian Democratic Party, Republican Calderonista Party (led by Calderon's son), the People's Union (led by Trejos) and the more left-wing Democratic Renovation (led by Carazo). It merged in the Social Christian Unity Party in 1983 establishing Costa Rica's two-party system. Liberals became a faction inside PUSC but were a minority after the Calderonistas and Christian Democrats. Despite their clear influences in the Echandi and Trejos government (not so much in Carazo's who was more left-leaning) and the election of Miguel Ángel Rodríguez Echeverría (a confirm liberal) as PUSC candidate and then Costa Rican President in the 1998 Costa Rican general election, Costa Rica lacked an official liberal party for decades.

This changed with the foundation of the Libertarian Movement in 1994. As the name implies the party was originally libertarian with some very radical ideas for the time, including demolishing completely the Welfare State, eliminating all public monopolies, legalizing same-sex marriage and recreational drugs, among other controversial positions in the Costa Rican society that was (and continues to be) very left-wing politically but very conservative socially. The party's first election was in 1998 and won one seat in the person of Otto Guevara Guth, lawyer and entrepreneur, Guevara became the party's lead figure and perennial candidate having run for president five times. The party modified its more radical position to become more mainstream, leaving most radical ideas behind and becoming libertarian only in name, entering the Liberal International and turning more into a liberal conservative party.

However, despite having important roles in both the 2006 and 2010 general election becoming the main right-wing opposition and the biggest party on the right and during the 2007 Costa Rican Dominican Republic – Central America Free Trade Agreement referendum endorsing the option for Yes, the party suffered from several corruption scandals including a sentence for fraud involving the Tribunal Supremo de Elecciones and the Friedrich Naumann Foundation (causing its departure from the Liberal International and Guevara's resignation as president of the regional), a critical financial situation and a drastic drop in electoral support. After ending fourth (behind the left) in the 2014 election and losing all its mayors in the mid-term local elections, the party lost all its seats in the 2018 election.

Other newly form liberal parties were created more recently including the Liberal Progressive Party and the United We Can party.
