= Carlos Durán Cartín =

Acting President of Costa Rica from 1889 to 1890

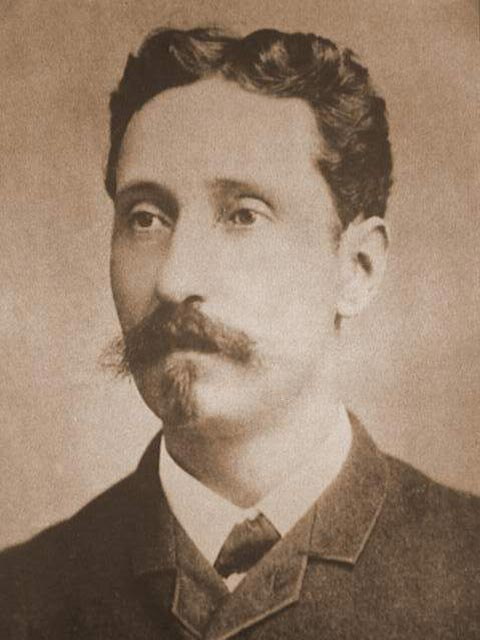
- Durán c. 1900

Acting President of Costa Rica
- In office 7 November 1889 – 8 May 1890
- Preceded by: Bernardo Soto Alfaro
- Succeeded by: José Joaquín Rodríguez

First Designate to the Presidency
- In office 8 May 1906 – 8 May 1910
- President: Cleto González Víquez
- Preceded by: Ricardo Jiménez Oreamuno
- Succeeded by: Manuel Jiménez Oreamuno

President of the Constitutional Congress
- In office 1 May 1892 – 31 August 1892
- Preceded by: Francisco Yglesias Llorente
- Succeeded by: Pedro León Páez Brown

Deputy of the Constitutional Congress
- In office 1 May 1912 – 30 April 1916
- Constituency: San José Province
- In office 1 May 1892 – 31 August 1892
- Constituency: San José Province

Second Designate to the Presidency
- In office 8 May 1890 – 8 May 1898
- President: José Joaquín Rodríguez; Rafael Iglesias Castro
- Preceded by: Ascensión Esquivel Ibarra
- Succeeded by: Juan Bautista Quirós Segura

Third Designate to the Presidency
- In office 8 May 1886 – 8 May 1890
- President: Bernardo Soto Alfaro
- Preceded by: José Oreamuno y Oreamuno
- Succeeded by: Joaquín Lizano Gutiérrez

Secretary of Public Works, Interior and Police
- In office March 1885 – 7 November 1889
- President: Bernardo Soto Alfaro
- Preceded by: Fadrique Gutiérrez
- Succeeded by: Pedro Pérez Zeledón (Interior)

Personal details
- Born: 12 November 1852 San José, Costa Rica
- Died: 23 November 1924 (aged 72) San José, Costa Rica
- Party: National Union Party
- Other political affiliations: National Party (1892)
- Spouse: Dolores Quirós Morales (m. 1876)
- Children: 9

Carlos Durán Cartín (12 November 1852 – 23 November 1924) was a Costa Rican physician, surgeon and politician who served as Acting President of Costa Rica from 1889 to 1890, following the withdrawal from power of President Bernardo Soto Alfaro, who did not formally resign from office. Durán held the office of Designate to the Presidency under presidents from different political parties between 1886 and 1910.

Educated in medicine in London, Durán was a prominent figure in Costa Rican public health. He is regarded as a pioneer in the treatment of mental illness in the country and was the founder of the Chapuí Asylum and the Antituberculosis Sanatorium, the latter of which was later named in his honor.

== Early life and education ==
Carlos Durán Cartín was born in San José, Costa Rica, on 12 November 1852. He was the son of José Durán Santillana, a Salvadoran merchant residing in Costa Rica, and Ramona Cartín Mora, a Costa Rican. Born out of wedlock, Durán lived with his father from approximately the age of seven and was formally recognized by him on 27 June 1867 before the Second Civil Judge of San José and future President of the Supreme Court, Vicente Sáenz Llorente.

Durán married Dolores Quirós Morales on 29 April 1876, in Carmen, San José. She was the daughter of José Antonio Quirós Rojas and Juana Morales y Valverde. The couple had nine children, born between 1877 and 1891.

Durán began his medical studies in Paris, France, before traveling to England to specialize in surgery. He completed his advanced medical training at Guy's Hospital in London, graduating as a physician and surgeon on 30 April 1874.

== Medical career ==
After completing his medical training in Europe, Durán returned to Costa Rica and devoted himself primarily to surgical practice and public health. He soon became one of the most prominent figures in the Costa Rican medical community.

Upon his return, Durán observed that individuals with mental illnesses were frequently confined in private homes or prisons. Concerned by these conditions, he advocated for the creation of a dedicated institution to provide appropriate care. He presented this proposal to President Bernardo Soto Alfaro, though securing sustainable funding for such a facility posed a significant challenge. Drawing on models he had encountered in Europe, Durán proposed the introduction of a national lottery to finance the construction and maintenance of a psychiatric hospital.

In 1885, President Soto and the Secretary of Public Works, Carlos Durán, approved the establishment of the National Asylum for the Insane in San José. Funding was provided through the creation of the National Lottery, whose administration was entrusted to the Charity Board of San Juan de Dios Hospital, of which Durán was director. This initiative enabled the founding of the psychiatric hospital later known as the Manuel Antonio Chapuí Hospital, which opened in 1890.

Durán also rendered extensive service to San Juan de Dios Hospital, where he promoted major institutional reforms. At the time, the hospital lacked basic infrastructure, including a dedicated operating room and adequate sanitation systems. Under his leadership, new and more suitable buildings were constructed, modern surgical facilities were introduced, and a water supply and sewage disposal system was implemented. He also established the hospital's first clinical laboratory, founded the School of Nursing, and ensured the provision of dental care, including services for patients with mental illnesses.

In addition to his hospital reforms, Durán founded the Antituberculosis Sanatorium, later named the Dr. Carlos Durán Sanatorium in his honor.

Political offices
Preceded by Bernardo Soto Alfaro	President of Costa Rica; 1889–1890	Succeeded by José Joaquín Rodríguez Zeledón
