= Félix Arcadio Montero Monge =

Costa Rican politician (1850–1897)

Félix Arcadio Montero
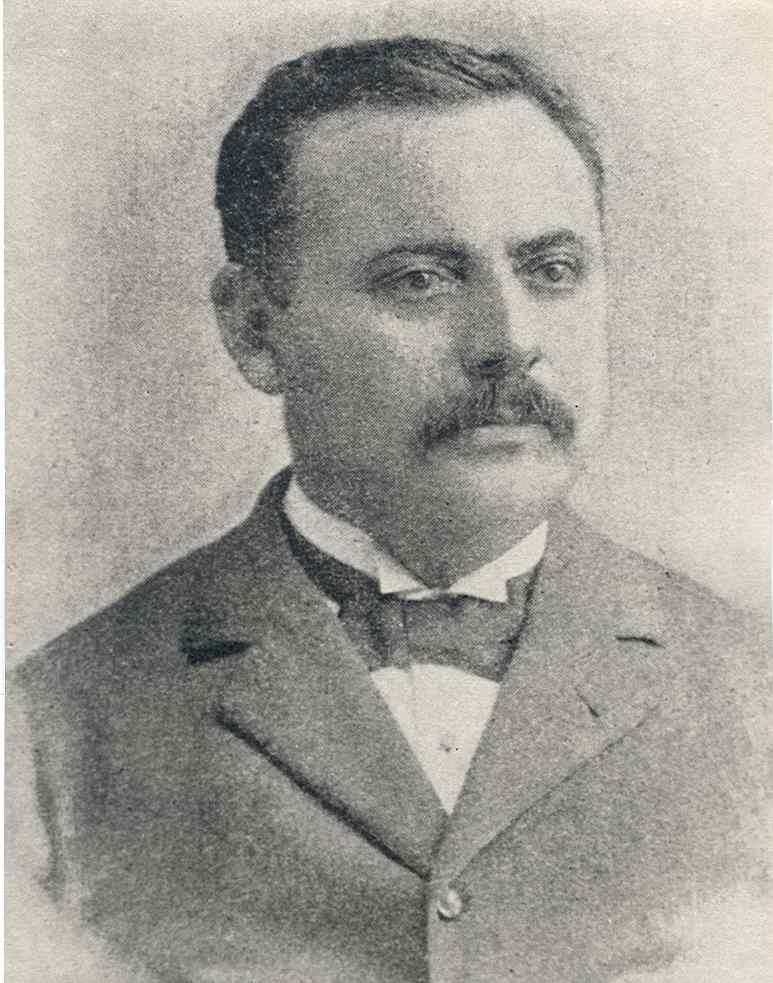
- Montero c. 1890

Deputy of the Constitutional Congress
- In office 1 May 1890 – 31 August 1892
- Constituency: Puntarenas Province

Personal details
- Born: Félix Arcadio Montero Monge; 1850 Santo Domingo, Costa Rica
- Died: 5 June 1897 (aged 47) El Salvador
- Party: Independent Democratic Party
- Other political affiliations: Constitutional Democratic (1889–1890)

Félix Arcadio Montero Monge (1850 – 5 June 1897) was a Costa Rican lawyer, union leader and politician who represented Puntarenas in the Constitutional Congress from 1890 to 1892. In 1893, he founded the Independent Democratic Party, which originated within liberal circles and sought to develop broader popular support. Contemporary observers frequently described his political positions as radical.

He was elected to Congress in 1889 as a deputy of the Constitutional Democratic Party. During his term, he advocated for the reestablishment of the University of Santo Tomás of Costa Rica and succeeded in securing congressional approval of a decree to that effect. The measure was ultimately not implemented, a development that contributed to his political break with the government and his subsequent alignment with the opposition.
