= Olympus Generation =

1890–1920 Costa Rican liberal intellectual community

The Olympus Generation (Generación del Olimpo), also called the 900 Generation, is the name given in Costa Rica to a group of intellectuals, teachers, historians, politicians and writers of liberal and positivist thought, whose ideas and philosophical, political, academic and cultural contributions were reflected in the sciences, arts, literature and politics between 1890 and 1920, this was the historical stage of Costa Rica where the liberal state is consolidated. Traditionally, they're known as the Olympus generation in reference to the Olympian gods of classical mythology, because most of them belonged to an oligarchic elite with political and economic power obtained from the international coffee trade during the second half of the 19th century. This was the nickname given by their detractors due to the arrogance of many of its members. The Olimpo generation played a leading role in the gestation of culture, national identity and the consolidation of the Costa Rican State.

== Politics ==
In the 1880s, a series of liberal reforms were promoted in Costa Rica, driven by a circle of intellectuals, scientists and politicians nicknamed "el Olimpo", due to the superb way in which these changes were carried out. This circle was formed during the dictatorship of General Tomás Guardia Gutiérrez (1870–1882) and his successors, Próspero Fernández Oreamuno and Bernardo Soto Alfaro (1882–1889). The objectives of Olympus included the secularization and Europeanization of the bourgeoisie and other urban groups, ascribed to the capitalist and positivist ideology of progress. At the same time, they sought to "civilize" popular cultures, converting people from the lower classes into literate citizens, identified with work and moral discipline, hygiene, science and patriotism. Aided by the expansion of public administration, The Olympus gave itself to the effort to modernize the country, spreading bourgeois values, stimulating capitalism and strengthening the State.

The first phase of the modernization of the Costa Rican State occurred between 1884 and 1889, and reached three main achievements in regard to the cultural aspect:

- the invention of the Costa Rican nation.
- the decisive impulse of popular literacy.
- the delimitation of the sphere of influence of the Catholic Church.

The formation of national identity revolved around the rescue of the events and figures of the National Campaign of 1856–1857. At the same time, there was an incorporation of the popular sectors in the political contests from the introduction of direct suffrage, mainly between 1897 and 1913, with an increase in citizen participation registered in the electoral roll, which went from 39 to 80%.

It was in this period that the construction of a large amount of national infrastructure destined for the service of the state took place: an Archive (1881), a Museum (1887), a Library (1888) and a Theater (1897). There was also the develization of the main monuments of the country, dedicated to the National Campaign: the National Monument (1895) and the statue of Juan Santamaría (1891).

The intellectuality of Olympus decisively promoted education and public health. The state also promoted the professionalization of the police, inaugurated a modern penitentiary in San José, and strengthened its support for the monitoring of poor families, carried out by charitable organizations.

== Literature ==
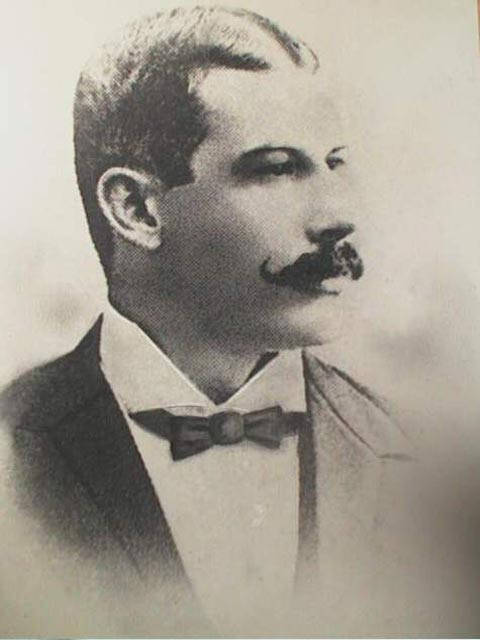
Aquileo J. Echeverría

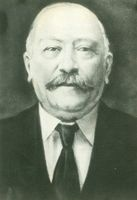
Carlos Gagini

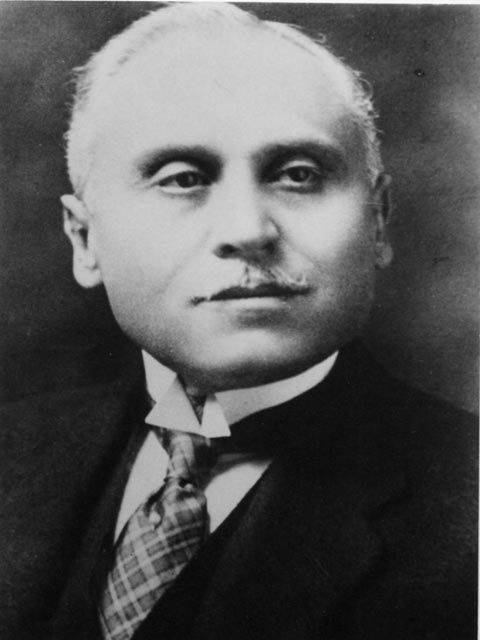
Ricardo Fernández Guardia

While politicians were setting up the new Liberal State in the last two decades of the nineteenth century, a group of intellectuals consisting of teachers, historians and writers are responsible for developing a new Costa Rican official mythology, with its national history, culture and literature. The concern of the members of El Olimpo to build a national identity at the end of the 19th century led them to strive to produce a Costa Rican national literature. The production, importation and circulation of books and pamphlets suffers a qualitative change after 1880, with a substantial decrease in the proportion of official and devotional texts, while the number of scientific works, social essays and literary works increases. From 1890, texts of European fashion writers circulate in the country, through newspapers and cultural magazines that are consolidating. This is how the first books of national literature are printed, since during the Colony and almost all the nineteenth century, the literary production in the Costa Rican territory was unimportant. Towards the end of the 19th century, the only genre that had had a bit of development was the customs table.

The first historical promotion of Costa Rican writers corresponds to the members of El Olimpo, whose authors have come to be considered as the classics of national literature. These writers were the first to discuss the possibilities or characteristics of literature, the first to publish books and literary magazines, to develop systematic models of literary representation of the national reality.

The historical, literary and ideological role of these authors consisted of elaborating a model of national literature that corresponded to the nationalist and civilizing project that began under the sign of oligarchic liberalism. The authors of the Olimpo generation offer in their texts the image of a society in transition where the discourse of tradition and the discourse of modernity coexist without assimilating or completely excluding one another. The discourse of tradition is associated with the preservation of certain traditions and customs of almost ritual nature, appearing as an index of identity and harmony, legitimizing social order and conscience and moral integrity, although they may also appear as a sign of inertia, expiration and conservatism, which leads to decadence and the inability to adapt to modernity. The discourse of modernity, on the other hand, is associated with individualism, the growth of mercantile relations, the power of money, the dissolution of traditional ties: it can be synonymous with freedom and progress, but also with moral and social decomposition, debauchery, alienation, agent of ideas and exotic customs that produce loss of national identity.

The image of the national reality of its writers is limited to the Central Valley of Costa Rica, habitat of the coffee oligarchy, and excludes the spaces of indigenous cultures, the Caribbean and the cattle and mining regions of the northeast of the country. In this way, it facilitates the oligarchical identification with European culture, strengthening the image of a country of racial and cultural homogeneity, under the pattern of a civilized western nation.6 However, his writings have ambivalence: the authors identify themselves the same as liberals, but in their texts they show distrust towards the social and moral consequences of bourgeois individualism, capitalist progress, market growth and the dissolution of traditional society. Costa Rican life is, in the texts of Olympus, a social world in trance, where traditions and national customs are yearned for, which are corroded by the values of capitalist modernity. The maturity of the writers of Olympus should coexist with the introduction of modernism, and coincide with the appearance of a second writers' promotion that will begin the questioning of the model imposed by Olympus: the generation of the Repertorio Americano.

== Notable figures ==
- Politicians: Tomás Guardia Gutiérrez, Próspero Fernández Oreamuno, Bernardo Soto Alfaro, Cleto González Víquez, Ascensión Esquivel Ibarra, Ricardo Jiménez Oreamuno and Julio Acosta García.
- Writers: Manuel de Jesús Jiménez Oreamuno, Jenaro Cardona Valverde, Pío Víquez, Carlos Gagini, Ricardo Fernández Guardia, Manuel González Zeledón, Aquileo J. Echeverría, Roberto Brenes Mesén, Lisímaco Chavarría.
