= Bernardo Soto Alfaro =

President of Costa Rica from 1885 to 1889

General Bernardo Soto Alfaro
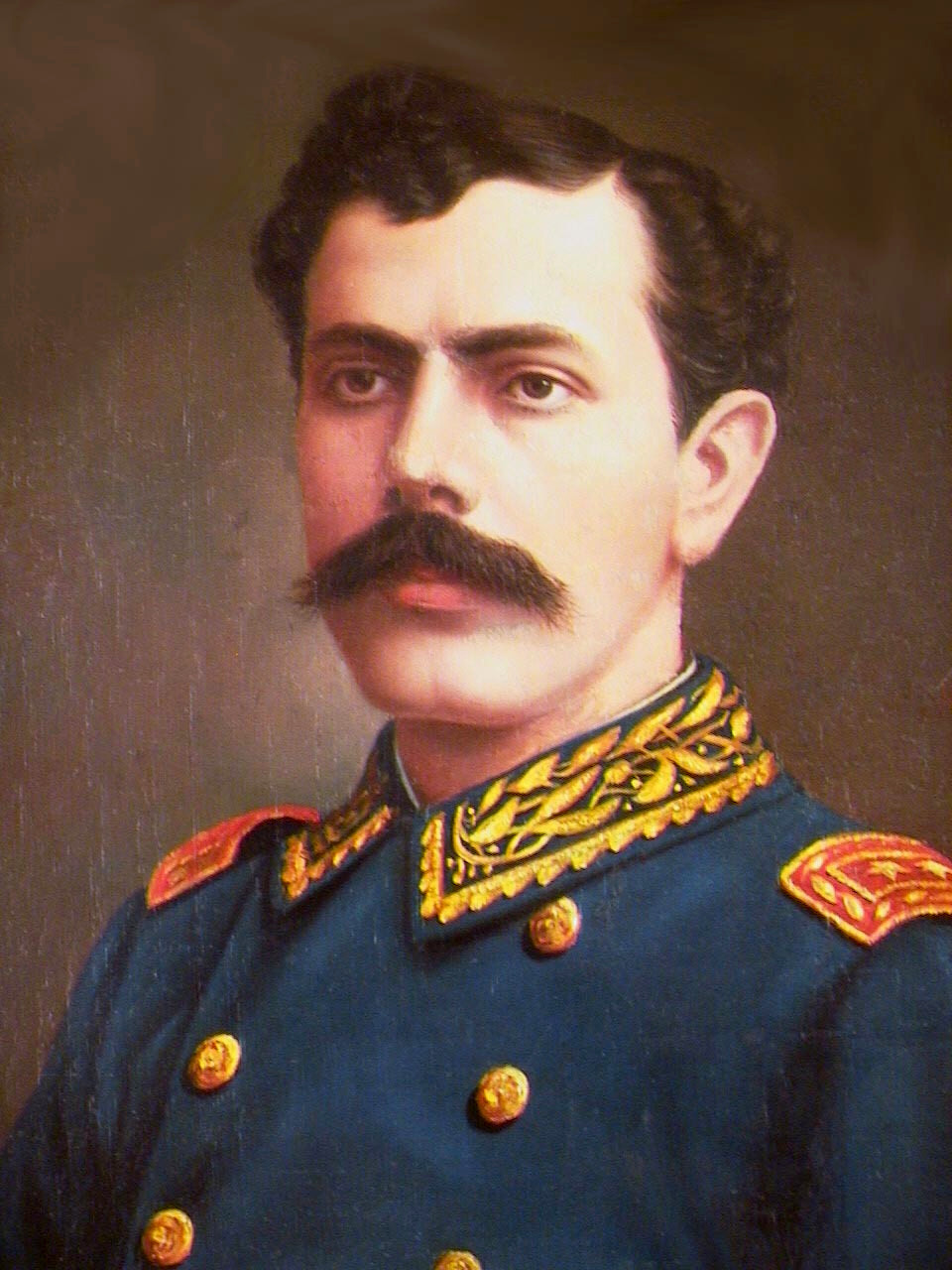
- Portrait by Enrique Etheridge

14th President of Costa Rica
- In office 12 March 1885 – 7 November 1889 (Note: Although his term constitutionally ended on 8 May 1890, Soto permanently separated himself from the office without resigning on 7 November 1889.)
- Preceded by: Próspero Fernández Oreamuno
- Succeeded by: Carlos Durán Cartín (acting)

First Designate to the Presidency
- In office 15 June 1883 – 12 March 1885
- President: Próspero Fernández Oreamuno
- Preceded by: Luis Diego Sáenz Carazo
- Succeeded by: Apolinar Soto Quesada

Secretary of War and Navy
- In office 17 January 1884 – 12 March 1885
- President: Próspero Fernández Oreamuno
- Preceded by: Víctor Guardia Gutiérrez
- Succeeded by: Santiago de la Guardia

Secretary of the Interior and Police
- In office 17 January 1884 – 12 March 1885
- President: Próspero Fernández Oreamuno
- Preceded by: Víctor Guardia Gutiérrez
- Succeeded by: Carlos Durán Cartín

Secretary of Finance and Commerce
- In office 10 August 1882 – 12 March 1885
- President: Próspero Fernández Oreamuno
- Preceded by: Luis Diego Sáenz Carazo
- Succeeded by: Mauro Fernández Acuña

Governor of Alajuela
- In office 8 May 1882 – 10 August 1882
- President: Tomás Guardia Gutiérrez; Saturnino Lizano Gutiérrez
- Preceded by: Nazario Ocampo

Personal details
- Born: Ramón Bernardo Soto Alfaro; 12 February 1854 Alajuela, Costa Rica
- Died: 28 January 1931 (aged 76) San José, Costa Rica
- Party: Independent
- Relations: Apolinar de Jesús Soto Quesada (father); José María Soto Alfaro (brother)
- Occupation: Military officer; politician; lawyer; landowner; businessman

Ramón Bernardo Soto Alfaro (12 February 1854 – 28 January 1931) was Costa Rican lawyer, military officer and politician who served as the 14th President of Costa Rica from 1885 to 1889. A Freemason and prominent member of the liberal Olympus Generation, he was the second-youngest person to assume the presidency, at age 31.

== Biography ==
=== Early life ===
On 12 February 1854, Soto was born to Apolinar de Jesús Soto Quesada and Joaquina Alfaro Muñoz in Alajuela. In 1871, he obtained a bachelor's degree in science and arts in San José, and on 10 December 1877, he obtained his law degree in the University of Santo Tomás, practicing until 1880. The following year he was governor of Alajuela Province. In 1882, he became Secretary of the Interior and Police, and then Secretary of the Army and Navy. On 15 May 1885, congress made him divisional general and awarded him the honorary title "Benemérito de la Patria" (Meritorious of the Country); in the same year, he was decorated by the Venezuelan government and made academician of the Royal Academy of Jurisprudence and Legislation of Spain. He was a distinguished member of the Olympus generation.

=== Presidency ===
Soto succeeded his brother-in-law, Próspero Fernández Oreamuno, when he died in office on 12 March 1885; until 14 April, Costa Rica was still involved in Barrios' War of Reunification. On 19 April 1885, he married Fernández's daughter Pacífica Fernández Guardia. On 4 December 1885, he signed a contract with Francisco María Fuentes and Pío Víquez to allow the construction of hydroelectric-powered streetcars in San José. Soto's administration continued Tomás Guardia Gutiérrez's liberal economic and national developments. Soto-appointed minister of education Mauro Fernández Acuña reformed education and in that established two new high schools in San José; he staffed them with European scholars, among them being Henri Pittier. Soto's administration opposed Chinese immigration and supported segregation for those already in the country. He violated the former in allowing Minor Keith to bring in 2,000 Chinese workers, who were made to leave after their contract expired. He ran unopposed in the 1886 general election after his uncle-in-law, Víctor Guardia Gutiérrez, withdrew his candidacy three weeks before the first round for the "well-being of the nation". When El Nacional continued to support the Guardia candidacy, Diario de Costa Rica labelled it "unpatriotic" and responded by publishing a letter claimed to by Guardia reinforcing his decision; ultimately, Guardia never renewed his candidacy due to pressure from pro-government sectors. On 24 April 1889, he and Minister of Foreign Affairs Manuel de Jesús Jiménez Oreamuno signed a letter addenda that agreed that Costa Rica would not interfere with the construction of the Nicaragua Canal by the Canal Company, reinforcing the convention of arbitration signed on 10 January.

During the 1889 general election, despite José Joaquín Rodríguez Zeledón's prospects for victory, he declared Ascensión Esquivel Ibarra president-elect. On 7 November, Rafael Yglesias Castro inspired a peasant march armed with knives and sticks in San José. Due to fear of outrage turning into bloodshed, the same day, Soto had Carlos Durán Cartín, whom he appointed secretary of the interior in 1885, serve as interim president for the remainder of his term. Rodríguez was his official successor. The last time Soto neared the presidency was when conspiracies and assassination attempts formed around Yglesias's second term as president after the 1897–1898 general election: suggestions by elites would have had Soto return to power but fell through, and Esquivel filled the position on 8 May 1902, to the agreement of Soto and Yglesias.

== See also ==
- Liberalism in Costa Rica
- List of political families#Costa Rica

== Notes ==
Bibliography

- Biesanz, Mavis Hiltunen; Biesanz, Richard; Biesanz, Karen Zubris (1999). "History". The Ticos: Culture and Social Change in Costa Rica. Boulder, Colorado: De Gruyter. ISBN 9781685854058.
- Defense Technical Information Center (1 November 1983). Area Handbook Series: Costa Rica, a Country Study. Defense Technical Information Center.
- Girón Beckless, Jéssica; Álvarez Hernández, Frank (2004). "El proceso electoral costarricense de 1886. Elementos fácticos y normativos". Revista de Ciencias Jurídicas (in Spanish) (105). ISSN 2215-5155.
