= 1897 Costa Rican general election =

- 14–16 November 1897 (popular vote); 12 December 1897 (electoral college)
- Presidential election
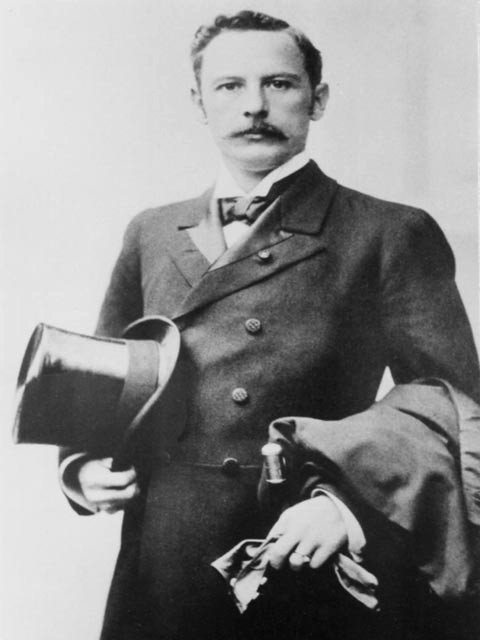
| Nominee | Rafael Yglesias Castro |
| Party | Civil |
| Electoral vote | 657 |
| Percentage | 100% |
President before election
Rafael Yglesias Castro
Civil
Elected President
Rafael Yglesias Castro
Civil

General elections were held in Costa Rica in 1897. Voters elected members of the electoral college on 14–16 November, who in turn elected the president on 12 December.

The elections were held under questionable conditions. Consecutive re-election was forbidden by the constitution. However, incumbent president Rafael Yglesias Castro forced a constitutional amendment allowing him to be a candidate. He was also the only candidate, as Yglesia's main opposition, the Republican Party, called for abstention.

== Results ==
| Candidate | Party | Votes | % |
|---|---|---|---|
| Rafael Yglesias Castro | Civil Party | 657 | 100.00 |
| Total | | 657 | 100.00 |
Source: TSE
