= José Joaquín Rodríguez Zeledón =

President of Costa Rica from 1890 to 1894

José Joaquín Rodríguez
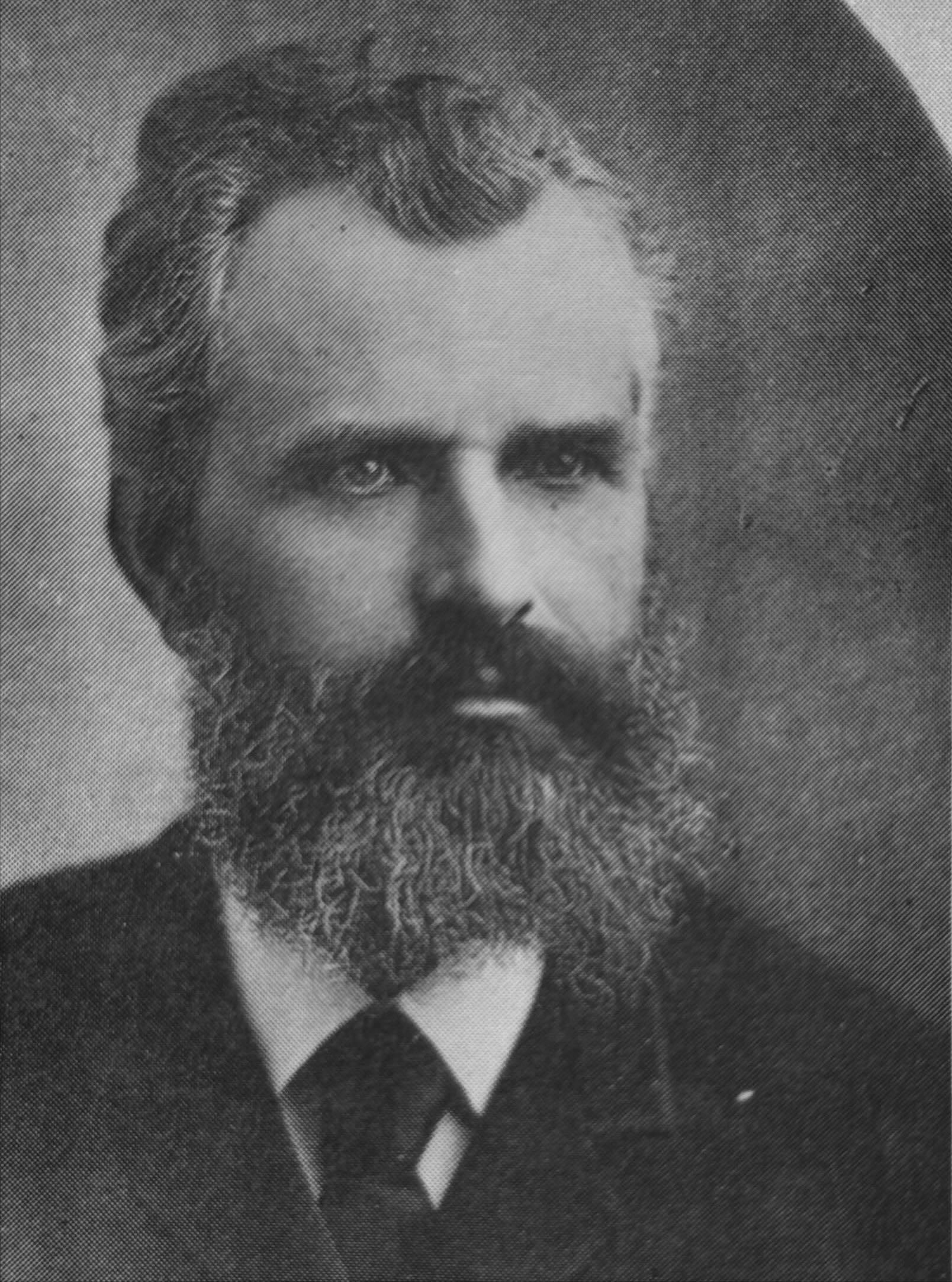
- Rodríguez c. 1885

15th President of Costa Rica
- In office 8 May 1890 – 8 May 1894
- Preceded by: Bernardo Soto Alfaro; Carlos Durán Cartín (acting)
- Succeeded by: Rafael Yglesias Castro

28th & 31st President of the Supreme Court
- In office 8 May 1898 – 8 May 1902
- Preceded by: Manuel Jiménez Oreamuno
- Succeeded by: Manuel Jiménez Oreamuno
- In office 1 January 1888 – 29 August 1889
- Preceded by: Vicente Sáenz Llorente
- Succeeded by: Vicente Sáenz Llorente

Magistrate of the Supreme Court of Justice
- In office 8 May 1898 – 8 May 1902
- In office 1 January 1888 – 29 August 1889
- In office 18 October 1870 – 8 May 1876

First Designate to the Presidency
- In office 8 May 1894 – 8 May 1898
- President: Rafael Yglesias Castro
- Preceded by: Pánfilo Valverde Carranza
- Succeeded by: Juan José Ulloa Giralt

Secretary of Foreign Affairs (Note: Simultaneously in charge of the portfolios of Justice, Grace, Worship and Charity.)
- In office 6 November 1886 – 4 December 1886
- President: Bernardo Soto Alfaro
- Preceded by: Ascensión Esquivel Ibarra
- Succeeded by: Ascensión Esquivel Ibarra

Additional positions
- 1880: Member of the Constituent Assembly
- 1876-1879: Chief Notary of the Diocese of Costa Rica
- 1863-1864: Alternate Member of the House of Representatives

Personal details
- Born: José Joaquín de los Reyes Rodríguez Zeledón; 6 January 1838 San José, Costa Rica, Federal Republic of Central America
- Died: 30 November 1917 (aged 79) San José, Costa Rica
- Party: Constitutional Democratic (1889–1890)
- Spouse: Luisa Alvarado Carrillo (m. 1870)
- Children: 7
- Relatives: Juan Mora Fernández (great-uncle); Rafael Yglesias Castro (son-in-law)
- Education: University of Santo Tomás (LLB)
- Occupation: Lawyer; judge; professor; politician; landowner

José Joaquín de los Reyes Rodríguez Zeledón (6 January 1838 – 30 November 1917) was a Costa Rican jurist and politician who served as the 15th President of Costa Rica from 1890 to 1894. He had previously served as President of the Supreme Court from 1888 to 1889 and as Secretary of Foreign Affairs in 1886.

== Early life ==
José Joaquín de los Reyes Rodríguez Zeledón was born on 6 January 1838, the third child of José Sebastián de Jesús Rodríguez Mora and Francisca Zeledón Mora, who were first cousins. He had two older sisters, Josefa and Gregoria. His paternal grandfather was the early independence-era politician Eusebio Rodríguez y Castro, who was married to Feliciana Mora Fernández, a sister of former heads of state Juan Mora Fernández and Joaquín Mora Fernández. The name "de los Reyes" was added to his given names at baptism, most likely in reference to his birth on the Feast of the Epiphany (Three Kings’ Day). The surname also coincided with that of his maternal lineage, in which several ancestors bore the name "de los Reyes Zeledón."

Rodríguez Zeledón completed his early education in San José. In 1852, at the age of fourteen, he was sent to Guatemala to continue his secondary studies and to pursue a law degree at the University of San Carlos Borromeo, the oldest university in Central America, where several Costa Ricans were also enrolled at the time. Shortly after his arrival, however, his father died in Costa Rica.

The resulting financial difficulties faced by his mother prevented him from continuing his studies abroad, and he was forced to return to Costa Rica. Back in San José, Rodríguez worked to support his family while continuing his legal education at the University of Santo Tomás. He completed his studies and was admitted to the bar on 8 June 1868.

In the late 1860s, Rodríguez entered into a formal courtship with Luisa Alvarado Carrillo, a younger woman from San José. She was the daughter of a physician and a niece of former head of state Braulio Carrillo Colina. The couple married in San José on 25 April 1870 and had seven children, comprising four sons and three daughters. One of their daughters, Manuela Rodríguez Alvarado, later married Rafael Yglesias Castro, Rodríguez's son-in-law and successor in the presidency.

== Early career ==
Rodríguez began his political career in September 1863, when he was elected as an alternate deputy (substitute representative) for San José Province. He resigned from this position in May 1864, having shown little inclination toward political life at the time. He later worked as a law professor at Santo Tomás during the 1870s.

On 18 October 1870, during the de facto government of Tomás Guardia Gutiérrez, a decree was issued reorganizing the Supreme Court and appointing new magistrates. The decree named former president José María Castro Madriz as president of the court and of its First Chamber, while José Ana Herrera Zeledón and Rodríguez were appointed as associate magistrates. This marked Rodríguez’s first service on the high court, at the age of 32. Following the promulgation of the 1871 Constitution, the Constitutional Congress confirmed his appointment, and he remained in office until 1876.

After completing his term as a magistrate, Rodríguez, who was known for his religious convictions and close ties to members of the clergy, was appointed interim Chief Notary of the Ecclesiastical Curia of the Roman Catholic Diocese of Costa Rica. He was formally confirmed in this role on 22 January 1877 and served until early 1879, when his resignation was accepted.

In July 1880, after several years of authoritarian rule, Guardia called elections for a constituent assembly to draft a new constitution and restore constitutional order. Rodríguez, by then a respected figure in legal circles, was elected as a delegate for San José Province. The Constituent Assembly convened on 9 August 1880, but its proceedings were marked by strong criticism of Guardia’s government. On 23 September 1880, Guardia suspended the assembly by decree, citing concerns over public order, which was not reconvened.

After September 1880, Rodríguez withdrew from active politics and returned to his legal and business activities. He was among the founders of the Costa Rican Bar Association in 1881 and served on its first board of directors. He was elected president of the association in 1882, and again in 1888 and 1905, while also serving in other capacities within the organization.

== Presidency (1890–1894) ==
Rodríguez was elected president in 1889 under the Constitutional Democratic Party by a significant majority, marking the beginning of a transitional period in Costa Rican politics that would eventually lead to a series of imposed governments. He assumed the presidency at the age of 52, becoming the first Costa Rican president elected under a formal political party and the last president born during the period in which Costa Rica was a member of the Federal Republic of Central America.

A devout Catholic, Rodríguez initially sought the support of the clergy to consolidate his administration. However, this alliance alarmed the liberal political faction, which ultimately offered him its support as circumstantial allies. Rodríguez accepted their cooperation and succeeded in defeating the conservative Catholic Union with the National Party in the midterm legislative elections held on 1 April 1892.

On 1 August 1892, he dissolved the Constitutional Congress and governed with expanded powers, although he retained the title of president rather than assuming a formal dictatorial role. In 1893, he reinstated civil liberties and individual guarantees, allowing for a more open electoral process. The subsequent 1894 presidential election was won by his son-in-law, Rafael Yglesias Castro, then serving as Secretary of War and Navy, and the candidate of the Civil Party.

Rodríguez's presidency was marked by political instability, and his governance methods—particularly his use of executive power to maintain order—were later criticized by segments of the population. Despite these controversies, his administration is credited with important educational and infrastructural developments. He promoted adult education by establishing night schools in San José and other provincial cities and approved a contract to establish telephone service in urban centers. His term also saw the beginning of construction on the National Theatre of Costa Rica, one of the country's most iconic cultural institutions.

José Joaquín Rodríguez Zeledón died in San José on 30 November 1917.

== Rodríguez's main successes ==
- He signed contracts to establish Costa Rica's first telephone service in 1891.
- He favoured education and created night schools for adults.
- He started construction on the National Theatre in 1890.
- He promoted European immigration for the country's colonization and agricultural development.

== Notes ==
Political offices
Preceded by Bernardo Soto Alfaro	President of Costa Rica; 1890-1894	Succeeded by Rafael Yglesias Castro
