= Catholic Union (Costa Rica) =

Costa Rican political party

The Catholic Union was a Costa Rican political party, emerged during the government of President José Rodríguez Zeledón. It was the first ideological party founded in Costa Rica. Its full name was Catholic Union of the Clergy of Costa Rica, and it had a conservative and confessional ideology, although it also endorsed the nascent Social doctrines of the Catholic Church. It participated in the legislative elections of 1892 and obtained an important number of deputies, although not enough to impose itself over the coalition liberals and pro-government of Rodriguez.

In the elections of 1894, it nominated the former Regent of the Supreme Court of Justice José Gregorio Trejos Gutiérrez. Although it won in the first degree elections of February 1894, the government suspended constitutional rights, imprisoned the candidate and numerous voters. The government's actions ensured that second-round elections were instead won by Rafael Yglesias Castro, Secretary of War and Navy and son-in-law of President Rodríguez.

The Catholic Union practically disappeared. In 1895, a constitutional reform was passed banning the use of political propaganda that invoked religion or religious beliefs. One of its main leaders was the coffee grower Alejo E. Jiménez Bonnefil (1858-1922) who came to occupy the presidency of the party and was joined by ties of friendship with the notable bishop Bernardo Augusto Thiel (1850-1901), promoter and godfather of the Catholic Union.

The Catholic Union had a clericalist ideology, it was also notably anti-Freemasonic, in fact one of the requisites to be a member of the party was not to be a Freemason and they spread anti-Freemasonic literature including the Handbook of the Anti-Freemason League.

In the elections of 1906, the conservative Democratic Union entered the scene, a party clearly linked to the former Catholic Union and that shared much of its leadership. They nominated Ezequiel Gutiérrez Iglesias for president, former Secretary of Foreign Affairs.
