= Cleto González Víquez =

President of Costa Rica (1906–1910; 1928–1932)

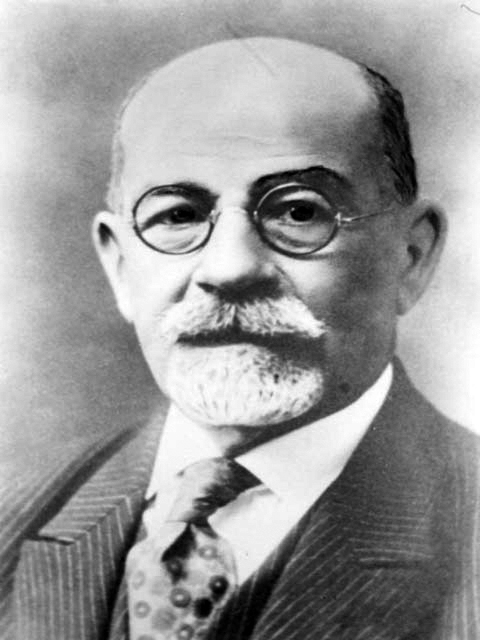
- González c. 1930

18th and 26th President of Costa Rica
- In office 8 May 1928 – 8 May 1932
- Preceded by: Ricardo Jiménez Oreamuno
- Succeeded by: Ricardo Jiménez Oreamuno
- In office 8 May 1906 – 8 May 1910
- Preceded by: Ascensión Esquivel Ibarra
- Succeeded by: Ricardo Jiménez Oreamuno

Deputy of the Constitutional Congress
- In office 1 May 1916 – 27 January 1917
- Constituency: San José Province
- In office 1 May 1892 – 1 August 1892
- Constituency: San José Province

Second Designate to the Presidency
- In office 8 May 1902 – 8 May 1906
- President: Ascensión Esquivel Ibarra
- Preceded by: Juan Bautista Quirós Segura
- Succeeded by: Andrés Venegas García

Secretary of Finance and Commerce
- In office 8 May 1902 – 31 March 1903
- President: Ascensión Esquivel Ibarra
- Succeeded by: Manuel Jiménez Oreamuno (acting)

Secretary of Foreign Affairs (Note: Simultaneously in charge of the portfolios of Justice, Grace, Worship and Charity.)
- In office 1 May 1889 – 12 August 1889
- President: Bernardo Soto Alfaro
- Preceded by: Manuel Jiménez Oreamuno
- Succeeded by: Ezequiel Gutiérrez Iglesias
- In office 18 March 1887 – 18 July 1887
- President: Bernardo Soto Alfaro
- Preceded by: Ascensión Esquivel Ibarra
- Succeeded by: Ascensión Esquivel Ibarra

Secretary of Interior and Police (Note: Simultaneously in charge of the portfolio of Public Works.)
- In office 12 March 1887 – 5 April 1888
- President: Bernardo Soto Alfaro
- Succeeded by: Pedro Pérez Zeledón

Under Secretary of Foreign Affairs
- In office 16 March 1886 – 25 August 1886
- President: Bernardo Soto Alfaro
- Preceded by: Manuel Carazo Peralta
- Succeeded by: Pío José Víquez Chinchilla

Additional positions
- 1923: Municipal President of San José
- 1917-1920: Associate Justice of the Supreme Court
- 1904-1906: Municipal President of San José
- 1889: Minister to Nicaragua
- 1888-1889: Commissioner to Madrid
- 1885-1886: Chargé d'affaires to the United States

Personal details
- Born: Cleto de Jesús González Víquez; 13 October 1858 Barva, Heredia, Costa Rica
- Died: 23 September 1937 (aged 78) San José, Costa Rica
- Party: National Union Party (from 1901)
- Other political affiliations: Republican Party (before 1901)
- Spouse: Adela Herrán Bonilla (m. 1889; died 1932)
- Children: 8
- Education: University of Santo Tomás (LLB)
- Profession: Lawyer; historian; politician; writer
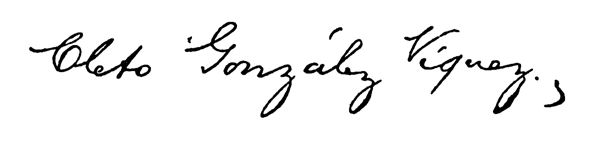
- Signature

Cleto de Jesús González Víquez (13 October 1858 – 23 September 1937) was a Costa Rican lawyer, historian and statesman who served as the 18th and 26th President of Costa Rica, serving from 1906 to 1910 and from 1928 to 1932. Alongside Ricardo Jiménez, González is regarded as one of the most influential Costa Rican liberal political figures of the 20th century.

He died in San José on 23 September 1937. In recognition of his service to the nation, González Víquez was posthumously awarded the title of Benemérito de la Patria (Meritorious of the Homeland) on 5 October 1944.

== Early life and career ==
Cleto de Jesús González Víquez was born in Barva, Heredia, on 13 October 1858. He was the eighth of eleven children born to Cleto González Pérez, a Nicaraguan-born politician who was elected to the Constitutional Congress in 1872 and 1876, and Aurora Víquez Murillo. The family was large and of relatively modest means.

He lived in his native town until 1868, when he moved to central Heredia to study Latin and Spanish. In 1870, he was sent to Cartago to attend secondary school at the recently founded Colegio San Luis Gonzaga, graduating three years later.

In 1874, González entered the University of Santo Tomás to study law. During his first year, his classmate was future president Ricardo Jiménez Oreamuno, with whom he shared lodgings in a small guest house south of the Colegio Superior de Señoritas in San José. During his final university years, he worked as a law clerk for the prominent Guatemalan lawyer Antonio Cruz Polanco in the capital. In 1877, at the age of 18, González began working as a secretary in the judicial mayor's office of Santo Domingo, Heredia, in order to complete the legal practice required by the university. He received no remuneration for the judicial matters in which he participated, though he did earn some payment for notarial work, which he shared with the judicial mayor (judge of minor cases), in whose house he resided. He worked there for fourteen months and was reportedly well regarded by the local community. He completed his studies in that year.

In 1880, González was appointed judicial mayor in San José, but was removed from office in September of that year after criticizing the authoritarian government of President Tomás Guardia Gutiérrez. González was granted his law license with distinction in November 1884 by unanimous vote. During the 1884 academic year, he had also taught a course on rhetoric, poetry, literature and the Spanish language at a secondary school called the National Institute.

On 12 May 1889, he married Adela Herrán Bonilla at the Catholic parish of El Carmen in San José. The ceremony was officiated by Bishop Bernardo Augusto Thiel, and one of the witnesses was presidential candidate and former professor Ascensión Esquivel Ibarra, alongside the bride's brother.

== Political career ==
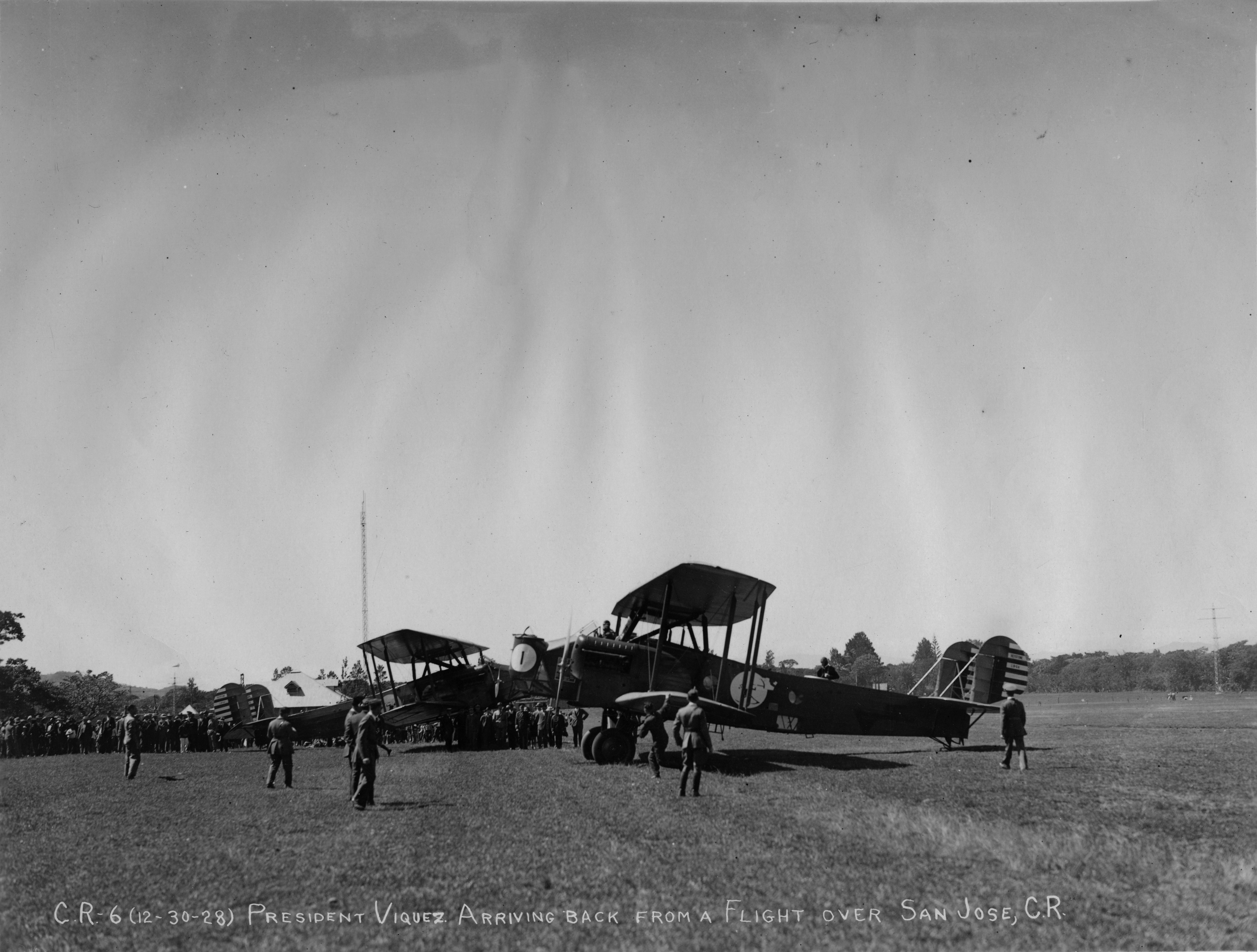
President Cleto González Víquez returning after a flight over San José, Costa Rica by the 25th Bombardment Squadron 1928.

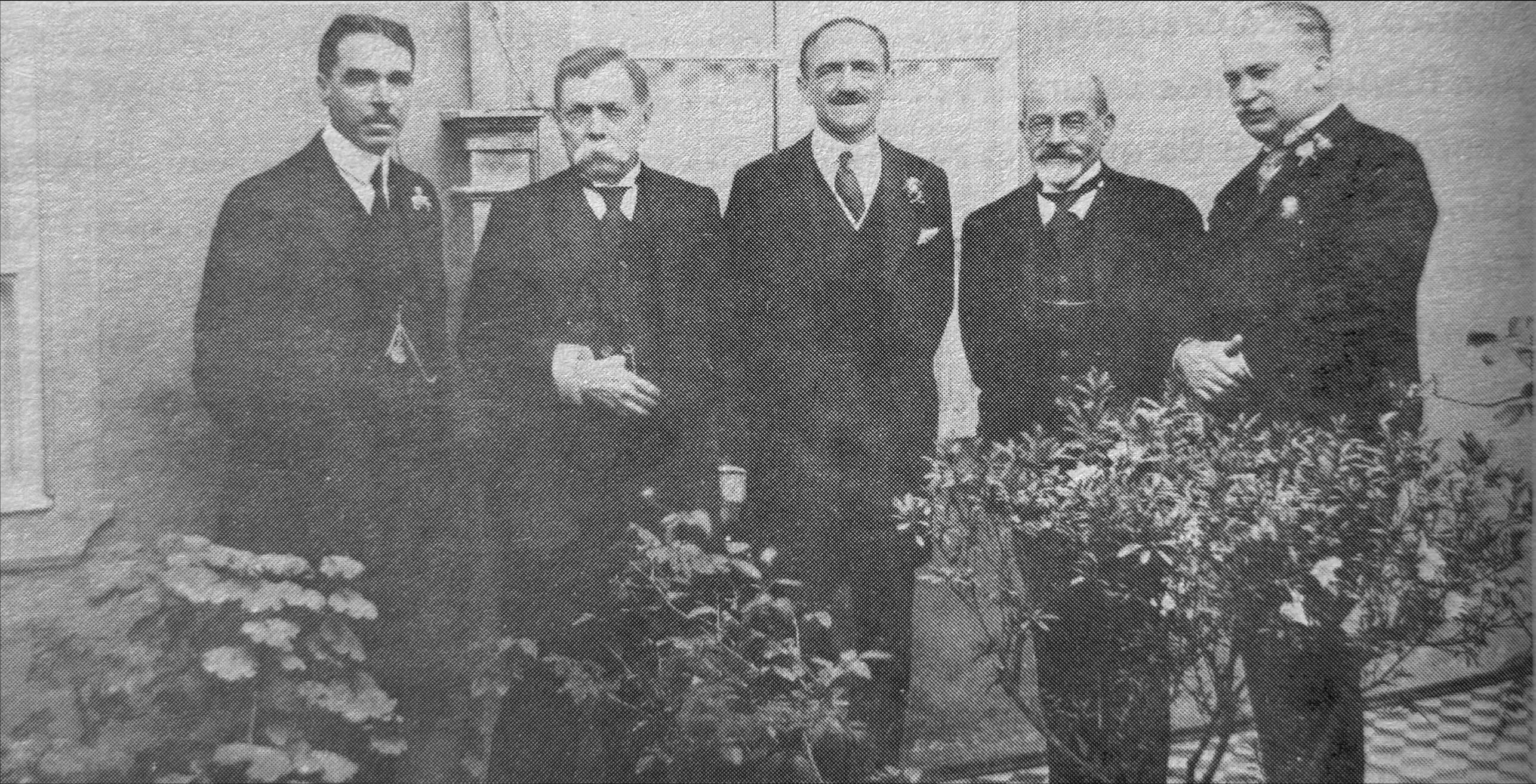
Presidents Alfredo González Flores, Bernardo Soto Alfaro, Cleto González Víquez and Julio Acosta García, c. 1920.

Cleto González Víquez began his political career at a young age, holding various public offices over several decades. Early in his career, he served as Undersecretary Foreign Affairs, Worship and Charity in 1886, and later as Secretary of the Interior, Police, and Public Works under President Bernardo Soto Alfaro from 1887 to 1888. He also served as Municipal President of San José, the capital, during two non-consecutive terms: from 1904 to 1905 and again from 1922 to 1923.

In 1892, he was elected as a deputy for Alajuela Province under the National Party, and briefly served as Vice President of the Constitutional Congress before its dissolution by President José Joaquín Rodríguez Zeledón three months into his tenure.

González Víquez was also active in civic and professional institutions. He served as President of the Costa Rican Bar Association from 1898 to 1900, and of the Junta de Caridad de San José (now the Junta de Protección Social, the national welfare and philanthropy agency) in 1898, again from 1900 to 1901, and from 1926 to 1928. In 1923, he became a founding member and the first director of the Costa Rican Academy of Language.

== First presidency (1906–1910) ==
In 1906, González Víquez was elected President for the first time. Lacking a majority in Congress, he governed with considerable political tact and pragmatism. He was elected again as a deputy in 1915, serving until the 1917 coup d'état. During the dictatorship of the Tinoco brothers and until 1920, he served as an Associate Justice of the Supreme Court of Justice.

== Second presidency (1928–1932) ==
He returned to the presidency for a second term from 1928 to 1932, during the global economic downturn of the Great Depression. During this period, González Víquez implemented policies influenced by emerging Keynesian economic principles, increasing public spending and launching infrastructure projects as a means to stimulate the economy and mitigate the effects of the crisis.

=== Main achievements ===
- He concluded the railroad to the Pacific in 1910
- He dictated the first Law of Railroads
- He expanded the System of Pipes of San José.
- He built the old building of the National Library
- Reinforced the municipal services
- He created the accounts receivable of Work in 1928 and Social Forecast and impulsed the making of a Code of Work
- He was prompted the accounts receivable of Agriculture they were created and Stockbreeding and the National Service of Electricity in 1928
- He created the attorney general's office of the Republic
- He founded the National Patronage of the Infancy
- He founded the First National Business of Air Transportations in 1932
- Inaugurated the dock of Puntarenas in 1928
- Paved the streets of San José

== Notes ==
Political offices
| Preceded by Ascensión Esquivel Ibarra | President of Costa Rica; 1906–1910 | Succeeded by Ricardo Jiménez Oreamuno |
| Preceded by Ricardo Jiménez Oreamuno | President of Costa Rica; 1928–1932 | Succeeded by Ricardo Jiménez Oreamuno |
