= Constitutional Party (Costa Rica) =

The name Constitutional was used for several loosely connected Costa Rican parties throughout history.

The first was the Constitutional Convention Party (Partido Convención Constitucional), also the first ever Costa Rican political party. It was formed in 1868 to oppose the presidential candidacy of Julián Volio Llorente, but disbanded soon after. Later Conservative candidate José Joaquín Rodríguez Zeledón, who was endorsed by the Catholic Church, was nominated by the Democratic Constitutional Party in the first ever elections with political parties in Costa Rica, the 1889 Costa Rican general election facing Ascensión Esquivel Ibarra of the also newly founded Liberal Party. After its main goal was accomplished, Rodriguez' victory, the party disbanded. Julio Acosta will be candidate for the Constitutional Party in the 1919 Costa Rican general election soon after the end of Federico Tinoco's two-year long dictatorship. As with other cases, the party was strongly personalist and disappear after the election. A more ideologically coherent party name Constitutional was founded by lawyers in order to take part in the 1948 Costa Rican Constituent Assembly election after the Costa Rican Civil War. The party was rumored to be led by the then outlaw Calderonistas who lost the war, but although most of its members were relatives of Calderonistas they never held offices during Calderon's party government and were allowed to participate, to the point that even the Electoral Court gave them an extension to end the conformation of the party thanks to then president Otilio Ulate intervention. The party was the second political force in the Costa Rican Constituent Assembly and also in the following 1949 Costa Rican general election.
