= Manuel de Jesús Jiménez Oreamuno =

Costa Rican historian and politician (1854–1916)

Manuel Jiménez Oreamuno

First Designate to the Presidency
- In office 8 May 1910 – 8 May 1914
- President: Ricardo Jiménez Oreamuno
- Preceded by: Carlos Durán Cartín
- Succeeded by: Alfredo González Flores

Deputy of the Constitutional Congress
- In office 8 May 1910 – 25 February 1916
- Constituency: Cartago Province (1910–1914); Alajuela Province (1917–1916)
- In office 1 May 1892 – 31 August 1892
- Constituency: Cartago Province
- In office 1 May 1886 – 28 September 1888
- Constituency: Cartago Province

Secretary of Foreign Affairs (Note: Simultaneously in charge of the portfolios of Justice, Grace, Worship and Charity.)
- In office 28 September 1888 – 30 April 1889
- President: Bernardo Soto Alfaro
- Preceded by: Pedro Pérez Zeledón
- Succeeded by: Cleto González Víquez

Personal details
- Born: Manuel de Jesús Jiménez Oreamuno; 16 June 1854 Cartago, Costa Rica
- Died: 25 February 1916 (aged 61) Alajuela, Costa Rica
- Party: Republican

Manuel de Jesús Jiménez Oreamuno (16 June 1854 – 25 February 1916) was a Costa Rican historian, writer and politician who served as First Designate to the Presidency from 1910 to 1914. He previously served as a deputy in Congress and as Secretary of Foreign Affairs.

== Biography ==
Jiménez was born in Cartago on 16 June 1854, the son of future president Jesús Jiménez Zamora and Esmeralda Oreamuno Gutiérrez. He studied at the San Luis Gonzaga College in Cartago, where he later taught history, geography, and literature. He married Clemencia Rojas Román.

He began his political career as Municipal President of Cartago (1883–1885) before serving as deputy for the province between 1886 and 1888 and again in 1892. From 1888 to 1889 he served as Secretary of Foreign Affairs. He was an unsuccessful candidate in the 1894 general election and later served as Secretary of Finance and Commerce from 1902 to 1904. Between 1904 and 1906, he was Costa Rica's Chargé d'Affaires and Consul General in El Salvador.

During the administration of his brother, President Ricardo Jiménez Oreamuno (1910–1914), he served as First Designate to the Presidency and again represented Cartago in the Constitutional Congress.

Alongside his political career, Jiménez devoted much of his work to history and literature. He wrote historical essays and short stories, many of which were collected in the two-volume Noticias del Pasado ("News of the Past"). He also published Jornadas de San Juan ("Careers of San Juan"). His genealogical research was later used by Archbishop Víctor Manuel Sanabria Martínez in the compilation of Genealogías de Cartago hasta 1850 ("Genealogies of Cartago up to 1850"). He died in Alajuela on 25 February 1916.
