= Rafael Iglesias Castro =

President of Costa Rica from 1894 to 1902

Rafael Iglesias Castro CMM LH OESSH
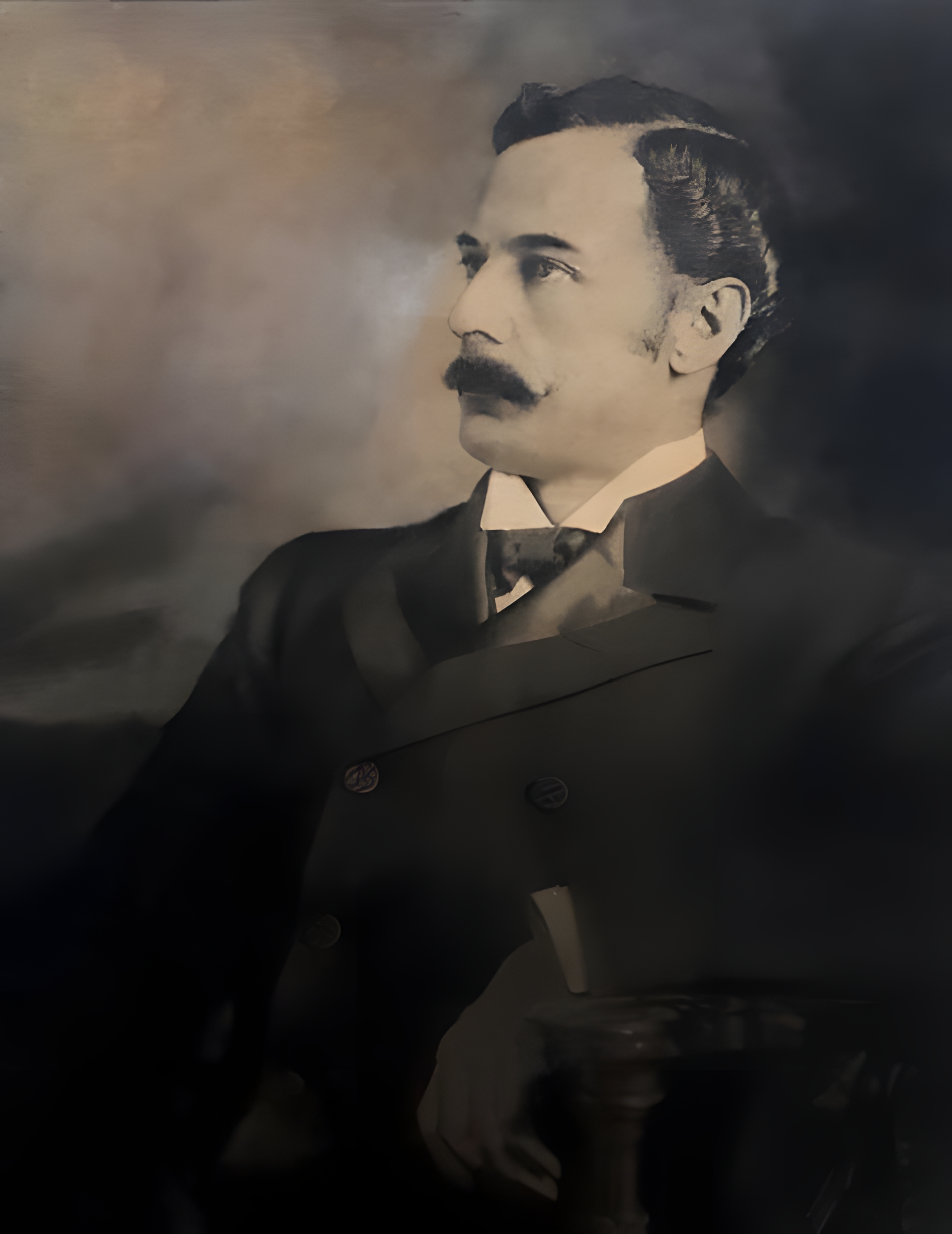
- Portrait c. 1900

16th President of Costa Rica
- In office 8 May 1894 – 8 May 1902
- Preceded by: José Joaquín Rodríguez
- Succeeded by: Ascensión Esquivel Ibarra

Secretary of Finance and Commerce
- In office 25 October 1893 – 8 May 1894
- President: José Joaquín Rodríguez
- Preceded by: Pánfilo Valverde Carranza
- Succeeded by: Ricardo Montealegre Mora

Secretary of War and Navy
- In office 8 May 1890 – 8 May 1894
- President: José Joaquín Rodríguez
- Preceded by: Ronulfo Quesada Soto
- Succeeded by: Juan Bautista Quirós Segura

Deputy of the Constitutional Congress
- In office 1 May 1890 – 8 May 1890
- Constituency: Alajuela Province

Personal details
- Born: Rafael Anselmo José Iglesias Castro; 18 April 1861 San José, Costa Rica
- Died: 10 April 1924 (aged 62) San José, Costa Rica
- Party: Civil
- Other political affiliations: Constitutional Democratic (1889–1890)
- Spouse: Manuela Rodríguez Alvarado (m. 1893)
- Children: 11
- Relatives: José María Castro Madriz (grandfather); Iris Flores (granddaughter)
- Occupation: Politician; businessman; merchant
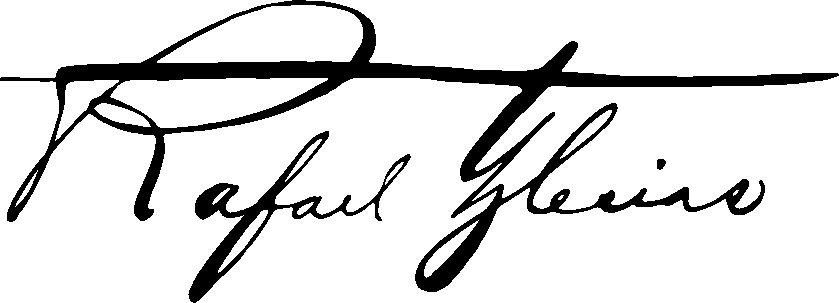
- Signature

Rafael Anselmo José Iglesias Castro, also known as Rafael Yglesias (18 April 1861 – 10 April 1924) was a Costa Rican politician and businessman who served as the 16th President of Costa Rica from 1894 to 1902, for two consecutive terms. The founder of the Civil Party, he was the second-youngest person to assume the presidency.

== Early life and education ==
He was born to Demetrio Iglesias Llorente and Eudoxia Castro Fernandez, whose father was also president, the "Founder of the Republic" José María Castro who served two terms, 1847–1849 and 1866–1868. Iglesias traveled to the United States and to Europe to further his education. He also studied law at the University of Santo Tomas, but was unable to complete his studies and left in 1878 due to his parents' economic difficulties at the time. He went into business, but did not meet with much success in that arena.

He got married in a civil ceremony to Rosa Banuet Ross in Cartago. They had two girls, Berta and Rosa (*official records of this marriage were destroyed in the earthquake of Cartago in 1910). He served as Secretary of War and Navy from 1890 to 1894. Iglesias and Rosa were divorced due to family pressure, and he married Manuela Petronila de la Trinidad Rodríguez Alvarado, daughter of President José Joaquín Rodríguez Zeledón (1890–1894). She was a private woman, and did not share his enthusiasm for the political arena. They had a happy domestic partnership, and produced eleven children; Miguel, Eduardo, Luisa, Eudoxia, Bernardo Rafael, Margarita, Maria de los Angeles, Manuel, Jose Maria and Rafael.

== Presidency (1894–1902) ==
In 1894, at the age of 33, Iglesias was elected president by a majority of 23,000 votes, and his election was marked with by largest voter turnout to date. Upon his election, he made official visits to Paris and London. He had an audience with Queen Victoria, for whom he had great respect. Duly impressed by the technological advancements he saw in Europe, he decided to return to Costa Rica and modernize it.

He completed the construction of a national theater (Teatro Nacional), and was present at its inaugural performance of Faust presented by a French company under the auspices of Frederic Aubrey. He established the colon as the unit of currency, and put Costa Rica on the gold standard. He completed the Atlantic to Pacific railway, and built up the coastal town of Puerto Limon. In addition, he set up a department of sanitation in the city.

He oversaw the construction of an electric tram system and introduced municipal electricity to the city of Heredia. He established a correctional institution for minors and pursued a series of educational reforms, including setting a precedent for school textbooks to be authored by Costa Rican writers. A proponent of public primary education influenced by positivism and Krausism, he founded the National School of Fine Arts (Escuela Nacional de Bellas Artes) in 1897. Like many reformers of his era, Yglesias emphasized the formation of civic-minded citizens and placed particular value on manual training and the experimental sciences as pathways to knowledge.

Iglesias was the first president to send a scientific expedition to Isla del Coco. Hearing of its rich natural resources, Iglesias closed the penal colony that was there, and decreed the island a nature preserve.

Iglesias established a system of emergency health care in the provinces. In 1895, the Constitutional Congress approved a measure to create a board of medicine, surgery and pharmacy, composed of all the doctors, surgeons and pharmacists that had been nationally certified. In 1902, he established the pharmaceutical college (Instituto de Farmacia).

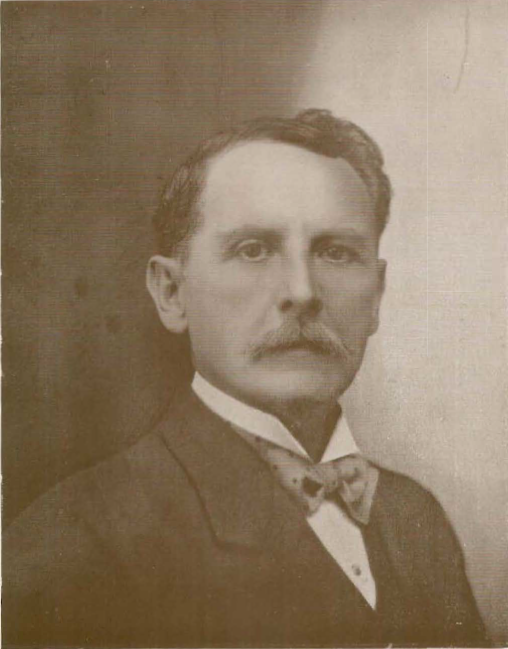
Rafael Iglesias Castro, in his later life

He tried to amend the constitution to allow for a third term, but was defeated. He ran for president again in 1910 and 1913, but was never re-elected.

== Later life and death ==
Yglesias sought the presidency again in 1910 and 1913. As the candidate of the Civil Party, he was defeated in the 1910 election by Ricardo Jiménez Oreamuno. His subsequent attempt in the 1913 election ended in controversy, with Alfredo González Flores ultimately assuming office. However, following the coup d'état that brought General Federico Tinoco Granados to power in 1917, Yglesias represented the deposed president, Alfredo González Flores, on several international diplomatic missions.

During this time, Yglesias also shifted his focus to business endeavors, primarily in timber exploitation, which gained momentum following the construction boom caused by the 1910 Costa Rica earthquake. He operated a sawmill, maintained cattle, and cultivated cedar nurseries on his estate, El Coyolar, spanning 20,000 hectares.

In 1917, Yglesias participated alongside other former presidents in the drafting committee for the constitutional project that formed the basis of the 1917 Constitution. Two years later, in 1919, he served as Costa Rica's Plenipotentiary Ambassador to Guatemala.

After the fall of the Tinoco dictatorship, Yglesias chose to withdraw from active politics, declining presidential nominations in both 1919 and 1923. He was later recognized as a corresponding member of the Royal Spanish Academy. During Julio Acosta García’s administration, Yglesias oversaw the operations of the Pacific Railroad as its Administrator, a role he held until his death.

Iglesias died in San Jose in 1924, and was buried in the Cementerio General de San Jose.

In 1981 he was awarded the title of "Benemerito de la Patria" for his years of service.

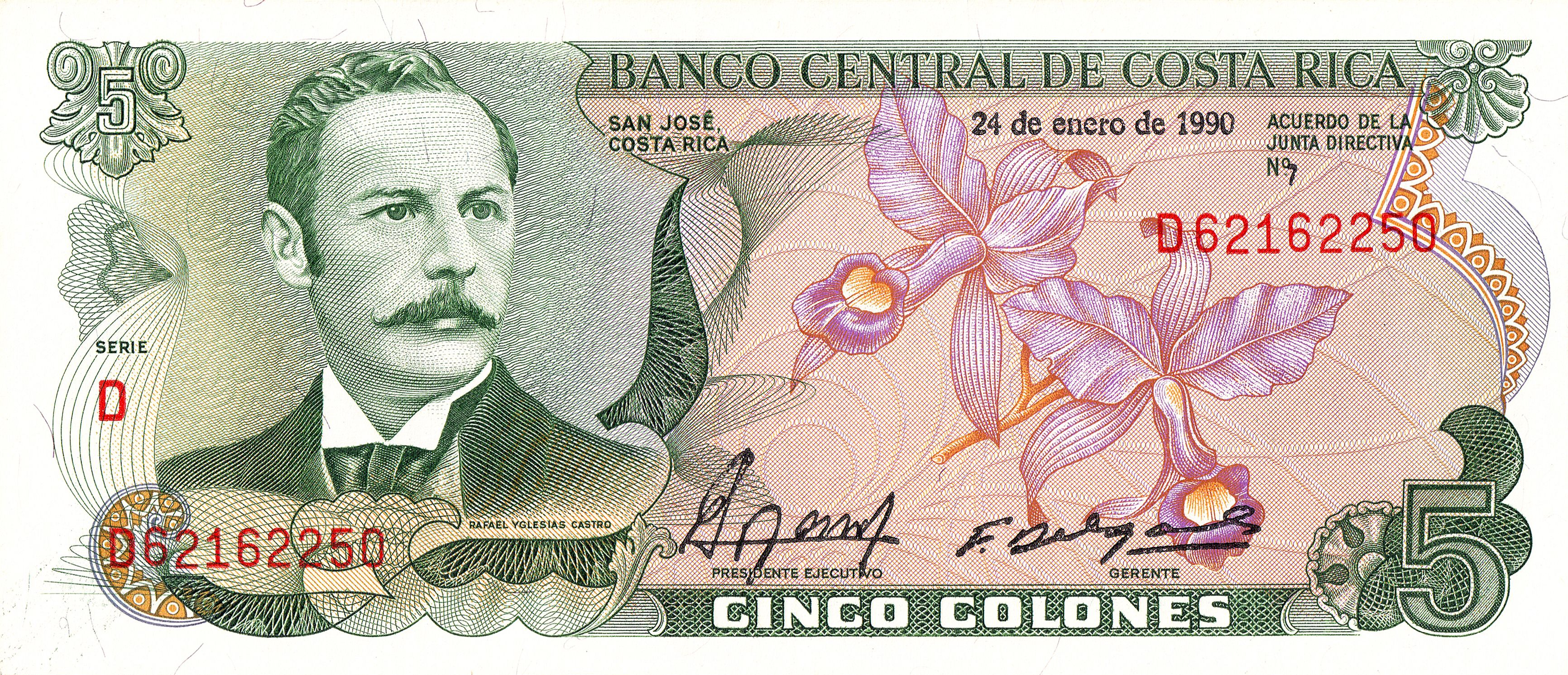
5 colones bill

Rafael Iglesias appeared on Costa Rican paper money in the former denomination of 5 colones. This edition was first printed in 1968.

Also, Rafael Iglesias appeared on Costa Rica postal stamps, in different editions.

== Sources ==
- Rafael Iglesias Castro – Carlos Calvo Gamboa, Ministerio de Cultura, Juventud y Deportes, Direccion de Publicaciones, San Jose, Costa Rica, 1980
- Personal Testimony – Berta Flores Iglesias, Iris Flores Schirmer, Fernando Flores Banuet

Political offices
| Preceded by José Rodríguez Zeledón | President of Costa Rica; 1894–1902 | Succeeded by Ascensión Esquivel Ibarra |
