= Ascensión Esquivel Ibarra =

President of Costa Rica from 1902 to 1906

Ascensión Esquivel Ibarra RAJYL
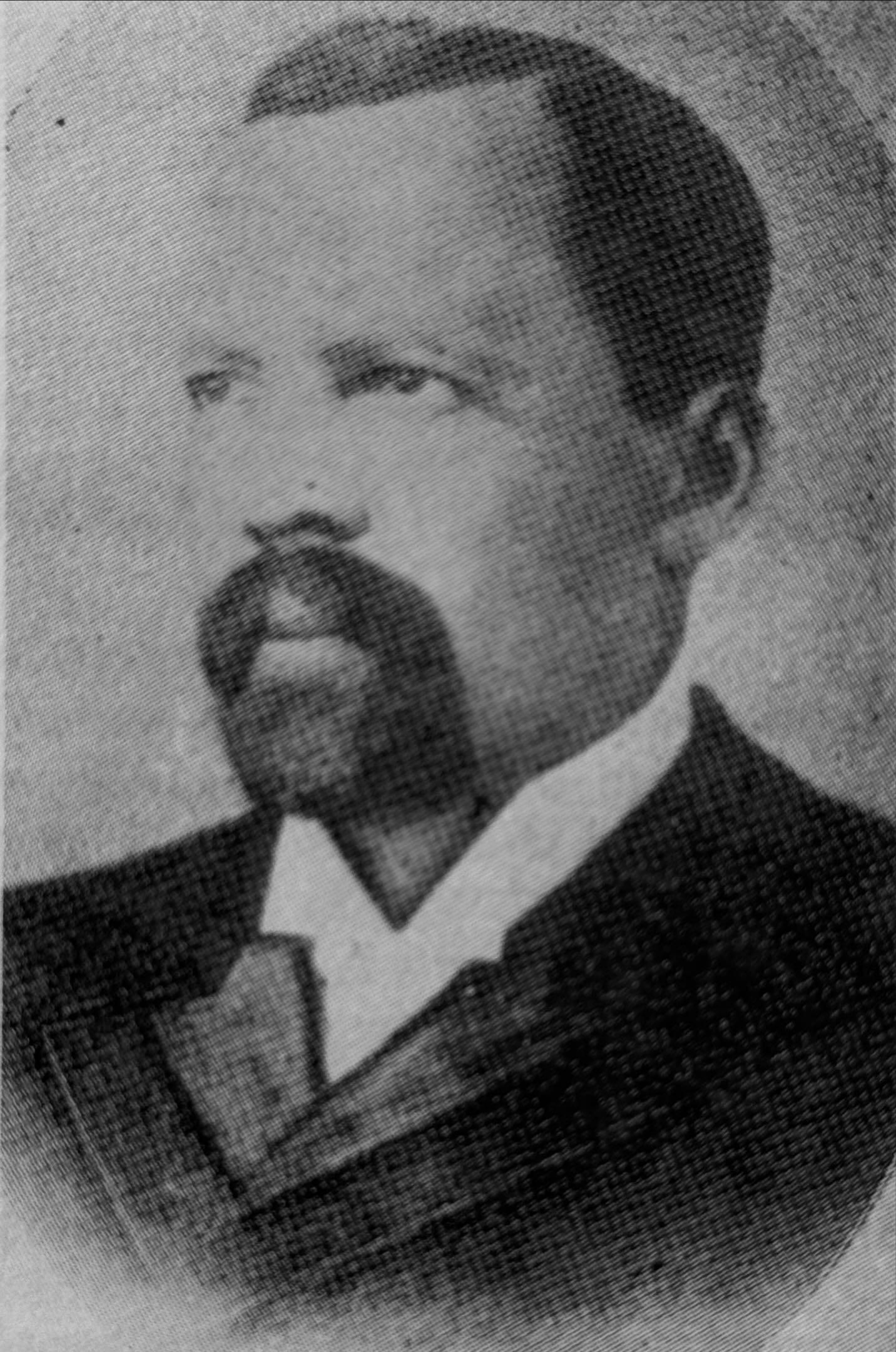
- Esquivel c. 1880

17th President of Costa Rica
- In office 8 May 1902 – 8 May 1906
- Preceded by: Rafael Yglesias Castro
- Succeeded by: Cleto González Víquez

36th President of the Supreme Court
- In office 19 April 1917 – 8 May 1920
- Preceded by: Ezequiel Gutiérrez Iglesias
- Succeeded by: Nicolás Oreamuno Ortiz

Third Designate to the Presidency
- In office 8 May 1898 – 11 May 1898
- President: Rafael Yglesias Castro
- Preceded by: Joaquín Lizano Gutiérrez
- Succeeded by: Demetrio Iglesias Llorente

Second Designate to the Presidency
- In office 8 May 1886 – 8 May 1890
- President: Bernardo Soto Alfaro
- Preceded by: Apolinar Soto Quesada
- Succeeded by: Pánfilo Valverde Carranza

Secretary of Foreign Affairs (Note: Simultaneously in charge of the portfolios of Justice, Grace, Worship and Charity.)
- In office 12 March 1887 – 2 August 1888
- President: Bernardo Soto Alfaro
- Preceded by: José Rodríguez Zeledón
- Succeeded by: Manuel Jiménez Oreamuno
- In office 11 May 1885 – 5 November 1886
- President: Bernardo Soto Alfaro
- Preceded by: José María Castro Madriz
- Succeeded by: José Rodríguez Zeledón

Additional positions
- 1906: Minister to Brasil
- 1896: Minister to Colombia
- 1887: Minister to Guatemala
- 1886: Minister to Guatemala
- 1885: Minister to Nicaragua
- 1884-1885: Consul-General of Nicaragua to Costa Rica

Personal details
- Born: José de la Ascensión Esquivel Ibarra; 10 May 1844 Rivas, Nicaragua
- Died: 15 April 1923 (aged 78) San José, Costa Rica
- Party: PUN
- Other political affiliations: Progressive Liberal (1889)
- Spouses: Herminia Boza y Boza (m. 1879; died 1894) Juana Adela Salazar Guardia (m. 1899; died 1907) Cristina Salazar Guardia (m. 1909)
- Children: 2
- Education: University of Santo Tomás (LLB)
- Occupation: Lawyer; politician; law professor; diplomat

José de la Ascensión Esquivel Ibarra (10 May 1844 – 15 April 1923) was a Costa Rican jurist, diplomat and politician who served as the 17th President of Costa Rica from 1902 to 1906. He had previously served as Secretary of Foreign Affairs from 1885 to 1886 and again from 1887 to 1888.

Born in Nicaragua, Esquivel immigrated to Costa Rica during childhood and became a naturalized Costa Rican citizen in 1869. He was the first foreign-born individual to be elected to the presidency, in 1902. After leaving office, he remained active in public service and later served as President of the Supreme Court from 1917 to 1920 during the Tinoco dictatorship and the subsequent provisional government.

== Early life and career ==
José de la Ascensión Esquivel Ibarra was born on 10 May 1844 in Los Cerros, Rivas, Nicaragua, to José María Esquivel and Antonia Ibarra, both Nicaraguan citizens. He was given the name Ascensión because he was born on the Catholic feast of the Ascension of Jesus.

In 1854, at the age of ten, he moved with his father to neighboring Costa Rica, where they settled in Liberia, Guanacaste. There, his father began working on the San Jerónimo hacienda, while Esquivel began his primary education at a school founded by the future priest Carlos María Ulloa Pérez. At the age of fifteen, Esquivel received his first public appointment in 1859, serving as a messenger at the government headquarters in Heredia, where his father had been named constitutional mayor. During this period, his father formally acknowledged him through a legal declaration of paternity.

In 1861, the Guanacastecan lawyer Antonio Álvarez invited Esquivel to travel with him to San José so that he could continue his studies. Esquivel and his father accepted the offer, and Álvarez took him into his household while also securing him a position as a court clerk at the Supreme Court of Justice. Within a few months, he moved to a rented room supported by his salary. Shortly after his nineteenth birthday, his father submitted a joint naturalization petition for both of them in May 1863. After meeting the legal requirements and presenting testimony from Costa Rican citizens attesting to their residence in the country since 1854, both were granted Costa Rican citizenship in June of that year.

In 1866, Esquivel completed his secondary education, and the following year he began studying law at the University of Santo Tomás. Alongside his duties as a court clerk, he also worked as an administrator for several newspapers and as a drafter of legal documents for private attorneys. In February 1869, he obtained a second certificate confirming his Costa Rican citizenship, and in November of that year he received his Bachelor of Laws degree.

In 1870, he was appointed senior registrar of properties in the mortgage registry for holdings in the provinces of Alajuela and Guanacaste and, in May 1872, he was appointed criminal judge of San José Province, despite not yet having completed the requirements for admission to legal practice. After issuing a ruling against a foreign national aligned with President Tomás Guardia Gutiérrez, he was dismissed from office and exiled to Limón. Although the exile was later revoked, his removal from the judgeship remained in effect.

In 1879, Esquivel began teaching forensic practice at the University of Santo Tomás and, by 1890, he was appointed professor of civil law at the independent Law School after the university was closed in August 1888.

== Presidency (1902-1906) ==
He first ran for the presidency in 1889 but was defeated by José Joaquín Rodríguez. He took up the challenge of running for president in the 1901 elections, which he consequently won. This was his second presidential bid and 1902 saw the start of his only presidency.

His government had to assume a nation with a still weak and little developed economy; however, his government managed to advance the development of the railroad to the Pacific and the establishment of the lyrics of the national anthem.

== Notes ==
Political offices
Preceded by Rafael Yglesias Castro	President of Costa Rica; 1902–1906	Succeeded by Cleto González Víquez
