= Liberal State =

1870–1940 period of Costa Rica

- 1870–1940
Oligarchic State	Reform State
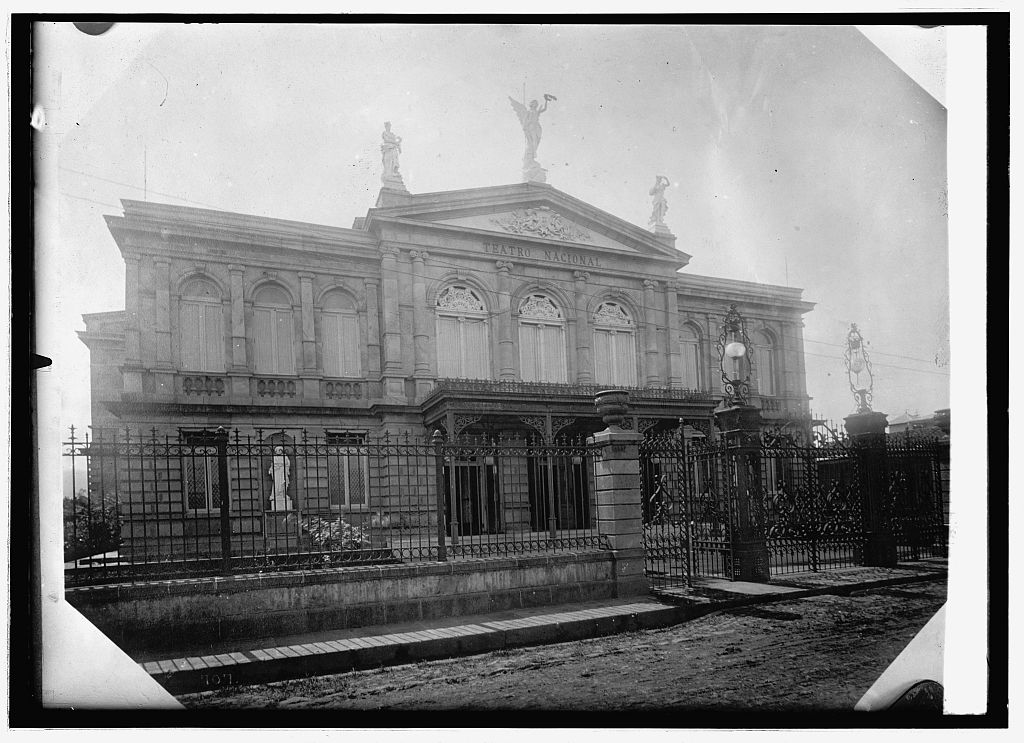
- National Theatre, a symbol of the Liberal State
- Leader: Costa Rican liberals

The Liberal State is the historical period in Costa Rica that occurred approximately between 1870 and 1940. It responded to the hegemonic dominion in the political, ideological and economic aspects of liberal philosophy. It is considered a period of transcendental importance in Costa Rican history, as it's when the consolidation of the National State and its institutions finally takes place.

The arrival of the Liberals in power meant a profound change that affected all the essential aspects of Costa Rican politics, economy, society and culture.

During this stage of national history, the development of a capitalist economy based on an agro-export model allowed Costa Rica its insertion in the world market and the generation of the necessary resources to develop its institutions and create infrastructure works, the most significant being the railroad to the Atlantic. The consolidation of coffee exports first, in the mid and late nineteenth century, and later those of banana, in the late nineteenth and early twentieth centuries, as engines of national development, will generate a series of cultural changes that will give the Costa Rican nation much of its current physiognomy. The consolidation of an agro-export bourgeoisie allied to foreign capital also triggered a series of social changes that will impel the working class to fight for a series of social reforms that will be consolidated towards the end of the period.

== Development of the Liberal State (1870–1929) ==
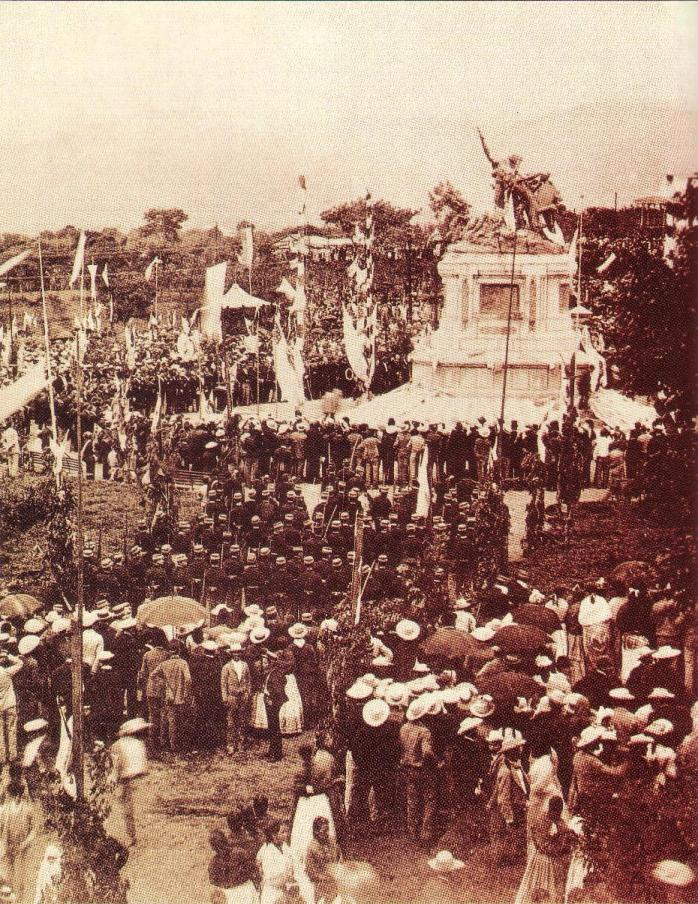
National Monument's inauguration in 1895.

In 1870, Jesús Jiménez Zamora was overthrown by Tomás Guardia Gutiérrez, who called a new National Constituent Assembly to draft a new Constitution in 1871, this being the longest running carta magna in the history of the country until 1949. Guardia abolished the death penalty, the torture and set the presidential term in four years.

In 1876 Aniceto Esquivel Sáenz was elected, with Guardia as head of the army and always having control of the country, taking power again in 1880. Guardia led a tough but progressive government. The concession for the construction of the first railway to the Atlantic began, commissioned to the American engineer Minor Cooper Keith, which ultimately also unleashed the exploitation of bananas as an export resource. At this time the first massive immigrations of Italian, Jamaicans and Chinese to work in the construction of the railroad begin. Guardia died in office and was succeeded by Próspero Fernández Oreamuno, who prepared the country for an eventual war against the intentions of Guatemalan General Justo Rufino Barrios, to reunify Central America by force, but with the death of Barrios war was avoided. In his government new civil, military and fiscal codes were drafted. Fernandez also expelled from the country, in 1884, the Jesuits, together with Bishop Bernardo Augusto Thiel, accusing the clergy of having political interference.

Upon the death of Fernandez in office, the government passed to Bernardo Soto Alfaro, who dedicated his management to the cultural and material development of the country. During his government, the work of Mauro Fernández Acuña, who founded the Normal School for teacher training, signed the General Law of Common Education, which expanded secondary education, as well as the foundation of the Liceo de Costa Rica, the Institute of Alajuela and the Superior School of Ladies between 1887 and 1888, and the closure of the University of Santo Tomás. In 1887, the National Museum of Costa Rica was created. During this decade, also, the national telephone service was inaugurated. In 1888, civil marriage and divorce were introduced, as well as the secularization of cemeteries.

During the government of Soto, the Red Cross was established in the country and the national lottery was created to finance hospitals. After the elections of 1889, the government of Soto tried to ignore the result that gave the victory, overwhelmingly, to José Joaquín Rodríguez Zeledón. On November 7 of that year, the entire population, under the leadership of Rafael Yglesias Castro, rose up in favor of Rodríguez's electoral triumph in the first civic and popular day of Costa Rican history, so that day is remembered as the Day of the Costa Rican Democracy. Soto preferred to depart from power rather than repress the population, handing over the government to Dr. Carlos Durán Cartín, first appointed, who six months later gave the government to Rodriguez.

The government of Rodríguez Zeledón was characterized by arbitrary actions in the exercise of its functions. During his government the monument to Juan Santamaría (1891) was inaugurated. He was succeeded by Rafael Yglesias Castro, whose administration was dynamic and progressive. In its management, the National Monument of Costa Rica (1895), the School of Fine Arts and the National Theater (1897) were inaugurated, the Gold Standard was implanted, the construction of the railroad to the Pacific began and many other works of progress were made. In 1899, the transnational company United Fruit Company was founded, which came to control the production and export of bananas during the following century, and whose presence was the trigger for important social movements in the 20th century.

During the second period of Rafael Yglesias, in 1900, the tramway was inaugurated in San José, the first Costa Rican novels were published (El Moto and Las Hijas del Campo, by Joaquín García Monge) and the first car was introduced, property of Enrique Carranza . In 1902, Yglesias was succeeded by Ascensión Esquivel Ibarra, whose government was austere and with a severe saving. During this government, the current letter of the National Anthem, written by José María Zeledón Brenes, was adopted.

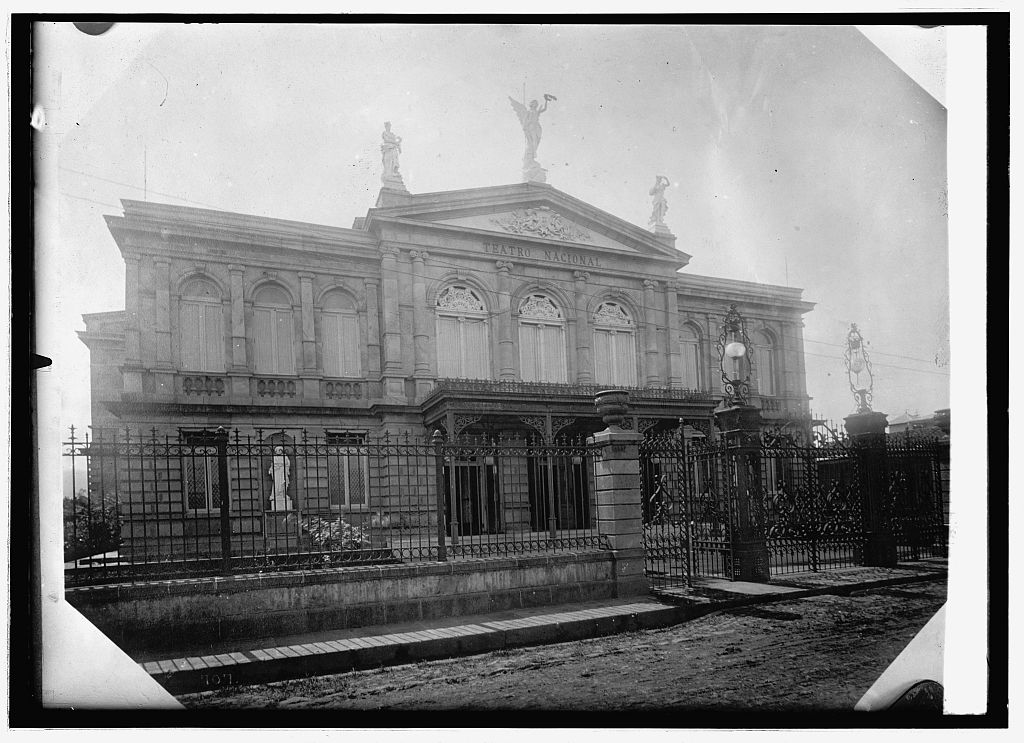
The Costa Rican National Theater

In 1906 began the first term of Cleto González Víquez, who expanded the pipe of San José and those of other cities. He was greatly concerned about public hygiene and municipal services. He built the building (already demolished) of the old National Library and finished the railway to the Pacific (1910). He was succeeded by Ricardo Jiménez Oreamuno (1910–1914), under whose mandate a direct vote was passed and the first high school graduate of the Liceo de Costa Rica, Ángela Acuña, graduated. In 1910, an earthquake destroyed the city of Cartago, which had to be rebuilt.

In 1914 Alfredo González Flores ascended to power, who created the Banco Internacional de Costa Rica. During his government, important tax laws were enacted. He was overthrown in 1917 by his Minister of War, Interior and National Defense, Federico Tinoco Granados, breaking with 27 years of political stability and constitutional order. The government of Tinoco was characterized by its repressive character and the constant violation of civil and political rights, as well as the abuse in the handling of public funds. There were several uprisings against him, such as the "Revolution of Sapoá", directed by Julio Acosta García, however, they were repressed harshly and even with the murder of several opposition leaders such as the journalist Rogelio Fernández Güell and the educator Marcelino García Flamenco in 1918.

Tinoco's downfall began in 1919, when the population of the Great Central Valley - headed by educators such as Carmen Lyra, high school students and workers - took to the streets to protest against an exaction that the government intended to make in the salaries of the teachers, and proletarians. The demonstrations and parades ended up igniting "La Información", a newspaper at the service of the dictatorship. A few weeks later, the brother of the dictator and Minister of War José Joaquín Tinoco Granados, was murdered in the corner of his house by a stranger and a few days later, the dictator, his family and his closest people, were exiled from the country and established in France, leaving the country ruined and exhausted.

After the interim governments of Juan Bautista Quirós Segura and Francisco Aguilar Barquero, the 1919 election would be won by Julio Acosta García. In 1920 the Costa Rican tenor Melico Salazar made his debut at the Metropolitan Opera House, with a work by Verdi.

In 1921 the country was involved in an armed conflict with the Republic of Panama known as the Coto War. In 1922, the International Bank was declared the only currency issuing entity, and one year later, Costa Rica would obtain an important judicial victory against Great Britain in the arbitration litigation ruled by the Taft Judgment.

In 1924, Ricardo Jiménez is re-elected President of the Republic. During this period, he created the National Insurance Bank (now the National Insurance Institute) and the Mortgage Credit Bank. He promoted livestock and agriculture, created the School of Agriculture and the Ministry of Health. He initiated the electrification of the railroad to the Pacific and the construction of the new pier of Puntarenas. In 1928 Cleto González Víquez is newly elected. During this administration the paving of the streets of San José began, improved some roads in the Central Valley, and finished the work of electrification of the railroad to the Pacific.

== Crisis of the Liberal State (1929–1940) ==
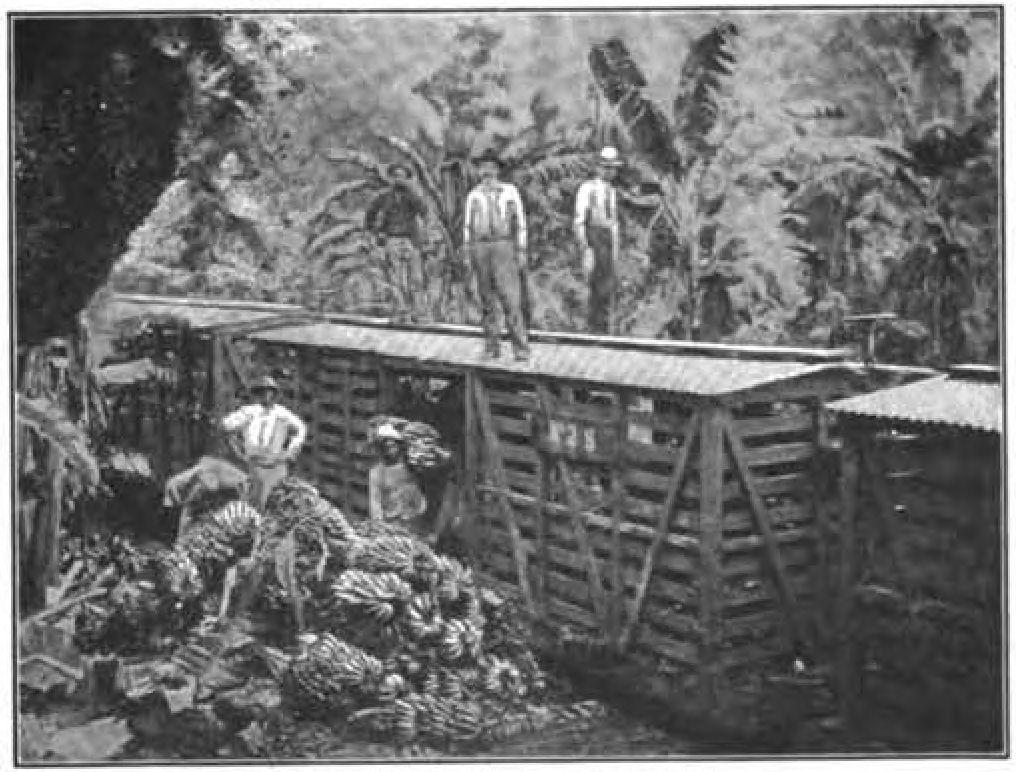
The Atlantic railroad construction.

Costa Rica of the nineteenth century, liberal and believer in the ideology of progress, was built on the principle that, released from market forces, an economy based on agricultural exports would lead to civilization and prosperity for all. However, the context of world crisis embodied by the First World War and then by the Great Depression of 1929 showed that the liberal project lacked an adequate response to the new economic situation, and before the collapse of the agro-export model (the fall of the prices of coffee and bananas in the international market), a new philosophy emerged: State intervention was necessary to maintain the good health of the national economy. At the same time, during the 1920s important advances were made in social matters (the implementation of the 8-hour day, the laws on tenancy, the law on accidents at work, the founding of the Bank of Insurance, the creation of Labor and Social Security Dispatches), from the founding of the Reformist Party by Father Jorge Volio Jiménez in 1923.

In 1929, the government of Ricardo Jiménez had to face a difficult fiscal situation, which had spread to all the countries of the world as a result of the Great Depression initiated in the United States. In 1930, a large number of workers' movements broke out due to the economic crisis that the country suffers, which led to the founding of the Communist Party in 1931 by Manuel Mora Valverde. This party would lead the banana strike of 1934 against the United Fruit Company, which constituted the first Central American banana strike, and its importance was that its scope was such that it placed the social issue at the forefront of the national debate and agenda.

By 1932, Ricardo Jiménez ruled once again, during his third period, during which he took the pipeline from Ojo de Agua to the port of Puntarenas. He built large buildings for primary schools and numerous roads to various parts of the country, the National Stadium and the Post Office. In general, the periods of government of Cleto González Víquez and Ricardo Jiménez Oreamuno are remembered as stable and of social peace.

In 1936 León Cortés Castro would rise to power. Previously Minister of Development (then Ministry of Public Works and Transport) of the government of Ricardo Jiménez, his administration was distinguished by a dynamic and brilliant policy in the field of public works (built schools, airports, public buildings, roads and pipes). In addition, it adopted an economic development policy strengthening the National Bank of Costa Rica. During his government, the renowned doctor, Dr. Ricardo Moreno Cañas, would be murdered in mysterious circumstances creating a folkloric legend about his ghost.

Finally, the coming to power reformist leader Rafael Angel Calderón Guardia in 1940 would end the Liberal State as such through a series of reforms known as the Social Guarantees of Christian socialist inspiration and supported by the Communists, which would switch the country into a Welfare State that persists to date. These reforms were controversial and generated such a degree of tension that they were one of the causes of the outbreak of the Costa Rican Civil War of 1948, even so, the winning side led by José Figueres would maintain the reforms and would even own some influenced by social democratic and Utopian socialist thinking as starting point of the Second Costa Rican Republic.

== See also ==
- First Costa Rican Republic
- Liberalism in Costa Rica
- Olympus Generation
