= Reform State =

Period in Costa Rican history

- 1940–1982
Liberal State	Neoliberal two-party system
- Leader(s): Republicans, Communists, Liberationists, Catholic Church

The Reform State or Reformist State (Spanish: Estado reformista) is the period in 20th-century Costa Rican history when the country switched from the uncontrolled capitalism and laissez-faire approach of the Liberal State into a more economically progressive Welfare State. It began about 1940 during the presidency of social reformer Rafael Angel Calderón Guardia, and ended in the 1980s with the neoliberal reforms inherent in the Washington Consensus that began after the government of Luis Alberto Monge.

== The Liberal State crisis ==
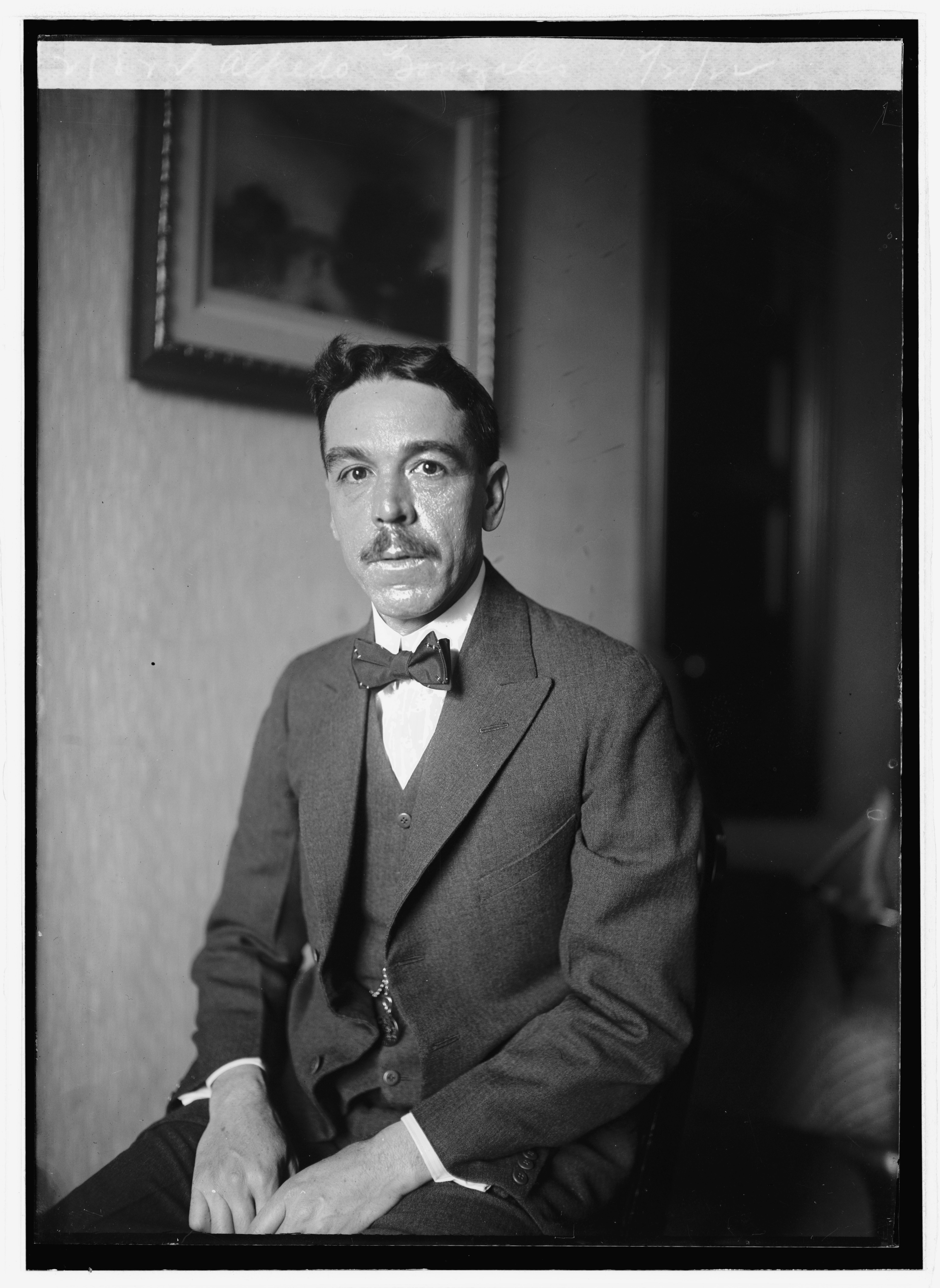
Alfredo González Flores.

Between 1870 and 1940, the Liberals were the predominant political faction of the country. They promoted a state based on a capitalist economy, philosophical positivism and rationalist secularism especially in education and science. However, these laissez-faire policies became unsustainable due to a series of incidental internal and external situations including the economic crisis caused by the First World War; the increase in poverty and stark economic inequality; harsh working conditions, especially in the banana plantations of the United Fruit Company; the emergence of political-social movements that questioned the model including social-Christians, socialists, communists and anarchists; and the immigration of ethnic groups such as Chinese, Afro-Caribbeans and Italians to work on large urbanization projects such as the Atlantic Railroad. The latter pair of factors intertwined and were especially significant. Italians staged the first strike in the history of Costa Rica, and many immigrants come from countries where the workers' rights and socialist movements were strong.

In 1914, the liberal Alfredo González Flores of the Republican Party came to power but without going through the polls. González was appointed by Congress when no candidate in the election reached the vote threshold established by the Constitution. Gonzalez thus lacked the popular support necessary for many of his reforms. He foresaw the exhaustion of the liberal model and initiated a series of interventionist reforms that included creating direct taxes for land and income; creating the first state bank, the International Bank of Costa Rica; implementing the "Tercerillas" (keeping one third of public employees' salary in the form of loans to generate income to the state); and taxing the Grand Capital. Most of these reforms, especially tax reforms, hurt the powerful oligarchy. Rumors spread of electoral fraud in the Costa Rican legislative elections of 1915 alongside suggestions that Gonzalez sought to establish an authoritarian regime and re-elect himself in 1918 (consecutive re-election was banned). This led to a coup by the Secretary of War Federico Tinoco in January of 1917 who, in principle, enjoyed popular support based on the April 1917 general election where his was the only name on the ballot. Tinoco's authoritarian measures and the chaotic economic situation soon led to the emergence of strong opposition. The tinoquista dictatorship would last only two years and the Tinoco brothers would be overthrown and exiled in 1919. The constitutional order was restored with the election of Julio Acosta in December 1919.

Jorge Volio Jiménez, a priest and veteran of the Sandino's fight to liberate Nicaragua from US occupation, returned during this period which increased the influence of Catholic social teaching and Christian humanism on Costa Rica's political and social fabric. Volio founded the Reformist Party, the first party of leftist ideas in Costa Rica. He stood for the presidency in 1923 and placed third behind Ricardo Jiménez Oreamuno (Partido Republicano Nacional) and Alberto Echandi Montero (Partido Agrícola). Since, once again, no candidate reached the constitutional threshold for election, Volio was able to negotiate with Jiménez to obtain the vice presidency for himself and two ministries for his party. The republican-reformist alliance faced the candidate Alberto Echandi Montero of the Agricultural Party, which both caucuses opposed as they considered him too right-wing.

Throughout this period, working conditions for many Costa Ricans were deplorable. The working population, influenced by intellectuals and politicians such as Manuel Mora Valverde, Maria Isabel Carvajal and Carlos Luis Fallas (who founded the Workers, Peasants and Intellectuals Bloc, the future Communist Party of Costa Rica), began a massive strike against the United Fruit Company. The 1934 Great Banana Strike involved about 10,000 workers and demanded such rights as wage increases, payment in cash instead of coupons, first aid kits on the farms, and an eight-hour workday. Although the strike appeared successful, United Fruit did not follow through on the commitments, increasing both the pressure from workers for more radical reforms and the resistance to those reforms from the oligarchy.

== Calderón's presidency ==
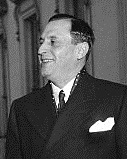
Rafael Ángel Calderón Guardia.

Rafael Ángel Calderón Guardia was a medical doctor educated in Belgium, where he came into contact with social-Christian and humanist political movements. His political ambitions were originally supported by his political godfather León Cortés Castro, a fellow member of the National Republican Party who served as the country's president from 1936 to 1940 and who was known for his fascist and Nazi sympathies.

Calderón won the 1940 presidential election, and soon after taking office, he broke with Cortes' powerful oligarchy and initiated a series of economic and social reforms. The oligarchs were vehemently opposed to these measures and planned a coup d'état against Calderón. Businessman Jorge Hine and one of the plotters tried to enlist Manuel Mora Valverde and his Communist Party of Costa Rica (Partido Comunista de Costa Rica). Mora declined and warned Calderón, who was able to frustrate the coup. Calderón, eager for allies, reached an agreement with Mora's party and the Catholic Church led by Monsignor Víctor Manuel Sanabria Martínez. To bring the Church into this alliance, the Communist Party changed its name to the Popular Vanguard Party (Partido Vanguardia Popular), and Calderon rolled back some of the secularizing measures taken by the Liberals. Of particular concern were laws that banned religious education and prohibited Catholic priests from positions as school principals.

The alliance gave Calderón enough political weight and popular support to promulgate the "Social Guarantees". The Costa Rican Social Security Fund, a cornerstone of Calderón's reforms, and the University of Costa Rica were both founded in this era. The latter effectively reconstituted the University of Santo Tomás, which had been closed by an anti-clerical government in 1888 and replaced with schools of Law and Notaries, Medicine and Engineering, Pharmacy, and Fine Arts. The other major reform was embodied by the drafting and approval of the Labor Code that created pioneering labor legislation. Opposition coalesced around conservative groups and oligarchs upset by these reforms, accusations of corruption and electoral fraud, and the persecution of ethnic groups such as Germans, Italians and Japanese during World War II, leading to the outbreak of the Costa Rican Civil War in 1948.

== 1948 revolution and Figueres presidency ==
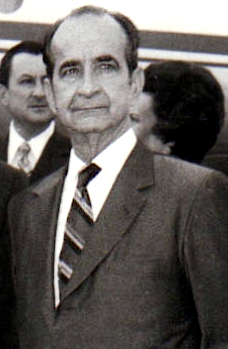
José Figueres Ferrer.

The 44-day 1948 Civil War brought Otilio Ulate and José Figueres to power. Communists and Republicans were outlawed and their leaders were exile, a move that was a betrayal of both the Ochomogo Pact with the communists and the Mexican Embassy Pact with the calderonistas). According to Figueres, representatives of the Oligarchy urged him to remain in power with their support and that of the press, but he rejected the proposal and informed Ulate. Figueres and his closest advisors formed a Junta which took for 18 months before passing the presidency to Ulate. Despite Figueres' revolt against both Calderón and Mora, he actually agreed with many of their social reforms as he was himself a self-proclaimed utopian socialist. Figueres and his Junta ruled by decree and made a series of progressive reforms that included abolition of racial segregation (Blacks and Asians could not vote and were banned from travel outside of certain areas, mostly the Limón Province); the creation of the Costa Rican Institute of Electricity; female suffrage as established in the Constitution; and, most notably, the abolition of the Army. An attempted coup by Public Safety Minister Edgar Cardona known as "Cardonazo" was, in part, due to disagreement with this decision.

== Welfare state and Carazo's crisis ==
Costa Rica essentially remained a welfare state with large public monopolies, many national institutions, a Keynesian guided economy, and state capitalism which has gained it the nickname, "entrepreneur state". This allowed the country to enjoy of one of the biggest middle classes in Latin America (alongside Chile, Uruguay and Argentina) and maintain high health, literacy, and urban development. These advantages came with problems including an increasing fiscal deficit, a gigantic state payroll, and an unsustainable statist economy which started to fracture the Reform State.

Left-leaning President Rodrigo Carazo (1978-1982) held left nationalist ideas and broke away from Washington, the World Bank and the IMF. Rejecting debt payment and the Washington Consensus, Carazo supported the Sandinistas (FSLN) in their action against the Somoza dictatorship in neighboring Nicaragua. This increased tensions and raised the spectre of a Somocista invasion at the same time that the oil crisis began to impact the economy of Costa Rica with shortages, unemployment and a grave economic crisis.

The Reform State effectively transitioned into a neoliberal, two-party state when Luis Alberto Monge scored a landslide victory in the 1982 Costa Rican general election. Monge reversed Carazo's policies and instead re-established relations with the World Bank and IMF, normalised US relations, and supporting its policies regarding Sandinista Nicaragua, even allowing the Contras to operate along the Costa Rica's northern border.

Most governments that followed Monge's implemented neoliberal measures: Oscar Arias Sánchez (1986-1990), Rafael Ángel Calderón Fournier (1990-1994), José María Figueres Olsen (1994-1998), Miguel Ángel Rodríguez Echeverría (1998-2002), Abel Pacheco (2002-2006), Oscar Arias Sánchez (2006-2010) and Laura Chinchilla Miranda (2010-2014). After the fusion of Carazo's Unity Coalition into the Social Christian Unity Party in 1983, Costa Rica emerged as a quintessential two-party system. Its most iconic representation was the so-called Figueres-Calderón Pact (an agreement between then president Figueres Olsen and former president Calderón Fournier in 1994) that enacted many unpopular neoliberal policies thanks to the combined vote of the PLN and PUSC caucuses in Parliament. The neoliberal, two-party system ended in turn with 2014's election of a progressive candidate from a third party, Luis Guillermo Solís of the Citizens' Action Party.
