= 1919 Costa Rican parliamentary election =

Mid-term parliamentary elections were held in Costa Rica on 2 March 1919. They were held under the 1917 constitution drawn up during the authoritarian regime of Federico Tinoco Granados, who had come to power in a coup that year. The constitution provided for a bicameral parliament with a 29-seat Chamber of Deputies and 14-seat Senate.

At the time, the Peliquista Party was the only legal party. It won all seats in both chambers. Voter turnout was 54%.

Tinoco resigned in August 1919 and parliament was dissolved shortly afterwards. Elections for a new president and parliament were held in December.
