= José María Soto Alfaro =

Costa Rican physician and politician (1860–1931)

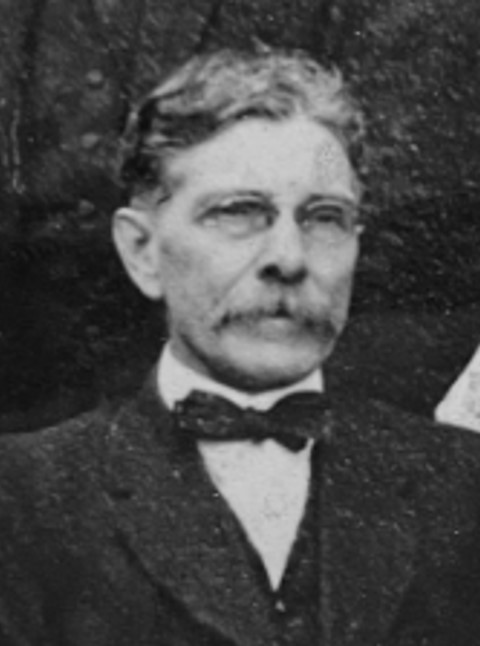

Deputy of the Constitutional Congress
- In office 1 May 1888 – 30 April 1892
- Constituency: Alajuela Province

Personal details
- Born: José María de Jesús Soto Alfaro; 24 March 1860 Alajuela, Costa Rica
- Died: 14 October 1931 (aged 71) San José, Costa Rica
- Party: Democratic Party (1919)
- Other political affiliations: Peliquista Party (1917–1919)
- Spouse: Emilia Guardia Solórzano (m. 1888)
- Children: 9
- Parent(s): Apolinar Soto Quesada; María Joaquina Alfaro Muñoz
- Education: University of Paris (MD)

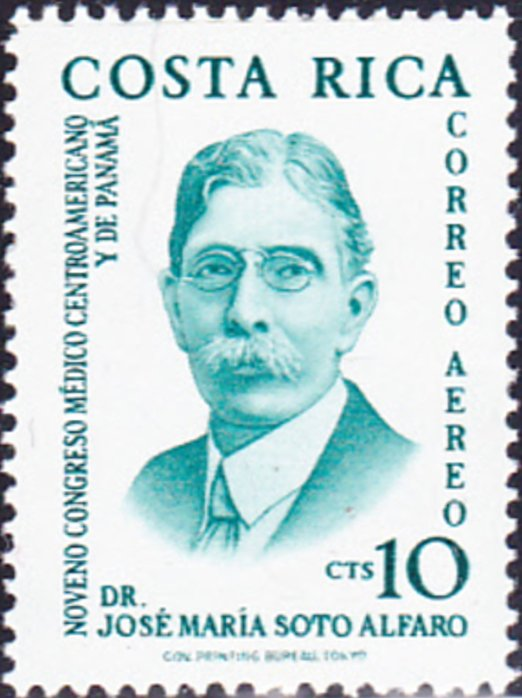
Soto in a Costa Rican stamp.

José María de Jesús Soto Alfaro (24 March 1860 – 14 October 1931) was a Costa Rican physician and politician. He was the tinoquista presidential candidate for the 1919 election.

Soto was born in Alajuela, the third son of General Apolinar de Jesús Soto Quesada and María Joaquina Alfaro Muñoz. He was the younger brother of Bernardo Soto Alfaro, who served as president of Costa Rica from 1885 to 1889.

Soto studied medicine in France and graduated from the University of Paris in 1885. He is credited with performing the first gastrostomy, thyroidectomy, and caesarean section in Costa Rica. He practiced medicine at the Faculty of Medicine of Costa Rica and at San Juan de Dios Hospital.

In addition to his medical work, Soto intermittently served as a deputy in the Constitutional Congress. He was a committed supporter of tinoquismo and strongly backed the regime established by Federico Tinoco Granados following the 1917 coup d’état. Soto founded the Club 27 de Enero (“27 January Club”), named in commemoration of the date on which President Alfredo González Flores was overthrown.

Following the fall of the Tinoco regime and the assassination of José Joaquín Tinoco Granados, Soto accepted the Democratic Party’s nomination as a presidential candidate in the 1919 general election. His candidacy opposed that of Julio Acosta García, whose victory was widely anticipated. Contemporary accounts and later historical interpretations have described Soto’s participation as primarily symbolic, intended to avoid an uncontested election.
