= Elena Gallegos Rosales =

- Born: María Natalia Elena Gallegos Rosales; 15 June 1881; San Salvador, El Salvador
- Died: 30 August 1954 (aged 72); San José, Costa Rica
- Other names: Elena Gallegos de Acosta, Elena Gallegos Rosales de Acosta
- Occupation: First Lady of Costa Rica
- Years active: 1920–1924

Elena Gallegos Rosales (15 June 1882 – 30 August 1954) was the Salvadoran-born wife of the 24th President of Costa Rica. During her tenure as first lady, she was responsible for furnishing and establishing the new Presidential House, performing charitable works, and accompanying her husband on various diplomatic trips.

== Early life ==
María Natalia Elena Gallegos Rosales was born on 15 June 1882 in San Salvador, El Salvador to Elena Rosales Ventura and Salvador Gallegos Valdés Her father was at one time the president of the Supreme Court of El Salvador and held the office as the Minister of Foreign Affairs and Education on several occasions. Gallegos completed her basic education in San Salvador and was then sent abroad to finish her education in Paris.

In 1907 when Julio Acosta García was sent to El Salvador as the Consul-General, he was introduced the Gallegos. After a three-year courtship, the two were married in April 1910. On 20 February 1911, Gallegos gave birth to twins, María, who died at birth, and Elena Zulai de Jesus Acosta Gallegos in the Santa Lucia neighborhood of San Salvador. (Note: Elena Zulai's birth was registered in both San Salvador and in Alajuela, Costa Rica. Given that her father was still posted in El Salvador until 1915, Gallegos was unlikely to have traveled to his family home for the birth, and that the twin sister was not registered in Costa Rica, it is more probable that they were born in San Salvador.)

== Career ==
In 1915, Acosta was recalled to return to Costa Rica and assume the position as Secretary of State for the Office of Foreign Relations, Justice, Grace, and Worship. Acosta was often out of the country on business, and during his term became the first Central American Minister to make official visits for all the countries of the isthmus. Gallegos was expecting another child in 1917, and gave birth to an unnamed daughter on 23 February 1917, who died at birth, barely a month after the coup d'état led by Federico Tinoco Granados on 27 January 1917. As soon as they could travel, the couple left the country and returned to El Salvador to live with Gallegos' parents. Julio initially worked as the manager of their farm, La Esperanza, but soon found work in the editorial office of the Diario del Salvador newspaper. After Tinoco was forced to resign in 1919 and the temporary president Juan Bautista Quirós Segura ceded power to interim president Francisco Aguilar Barquero, Acosta was invited to return to Costa Rica.

Bringing his family back to Costa Rica, Acosta began campaigning for the presidency. He was elected with 89% of the vote and took office on 8 May 1920. The immediate problem for Gallegos, with Acosta's election was where they were to live. The Blue Castle, which had served as the Presidential House was rejected as a residence or place to conduct business because of its association with Tinoco's dictatorship. In December 1920, the Legislative Assembly approved the purchase of a property located at the corner of 3rd Avenue and 15th Street, which had been built at the end of the 1870s by Tomás Guardia. At the time of the purchase, the building was serving as the headquarters of the Northern Railway Company. (Since 1995 the former presidential home has been the home of the Supreme Electoral Tribunal of Costa Rica). Gallegos was responsible for decorating, furnishing and organizing the Presidential House and due to the limited budget of the country, used her own funds to prepare the home in a simple but stately manner.

During Acosta's presidency, Gallegos was also instrumental in bringing the religious order of the Congregation of Our Lady of Charity of the Good Shepherd to Costa Rica. This group had been established in León, Nicaragua in 1911 but expansion during the anticlerical Tinoco regime, had been impossible. Concerned with the lack of opportunities for women, Gallegos and other women, who worked with the women incarcerated at the women's prison, invited the sisters to Costa Rica, with the approval of the government. The Sisters established the House of Refuge (Spanish: Casa del Refugio which was aimed at teaching reading, writing, geography and arithmetic to women prisoners. Those who were released, could remain at the refuge and were provided with room and board, in exchange for their labor in washing, ironing and repairing clothes for public patrons.

The term of presidency ended in 1924 and the family moved to Paris, where Acosta worked for the Red Cross for three years before returning to Costa Rica. From his return until 1944, when he was reappointed as Foreign Minister, Acosta held various positions with the government. Gallegos accompanied him on various diplomatic missions, including the 1945 conference in San Francisco, California for the signing of the United Nations Charter.

== Death and legacy ==
Gallegos died on 30 August 1954 in San José, Costa Rica. Her only surviving child, Zulay married the Colombian diplomat, Pedro Manuel Revollo Samper.
