= Costa Rican Constitution of 1917 =

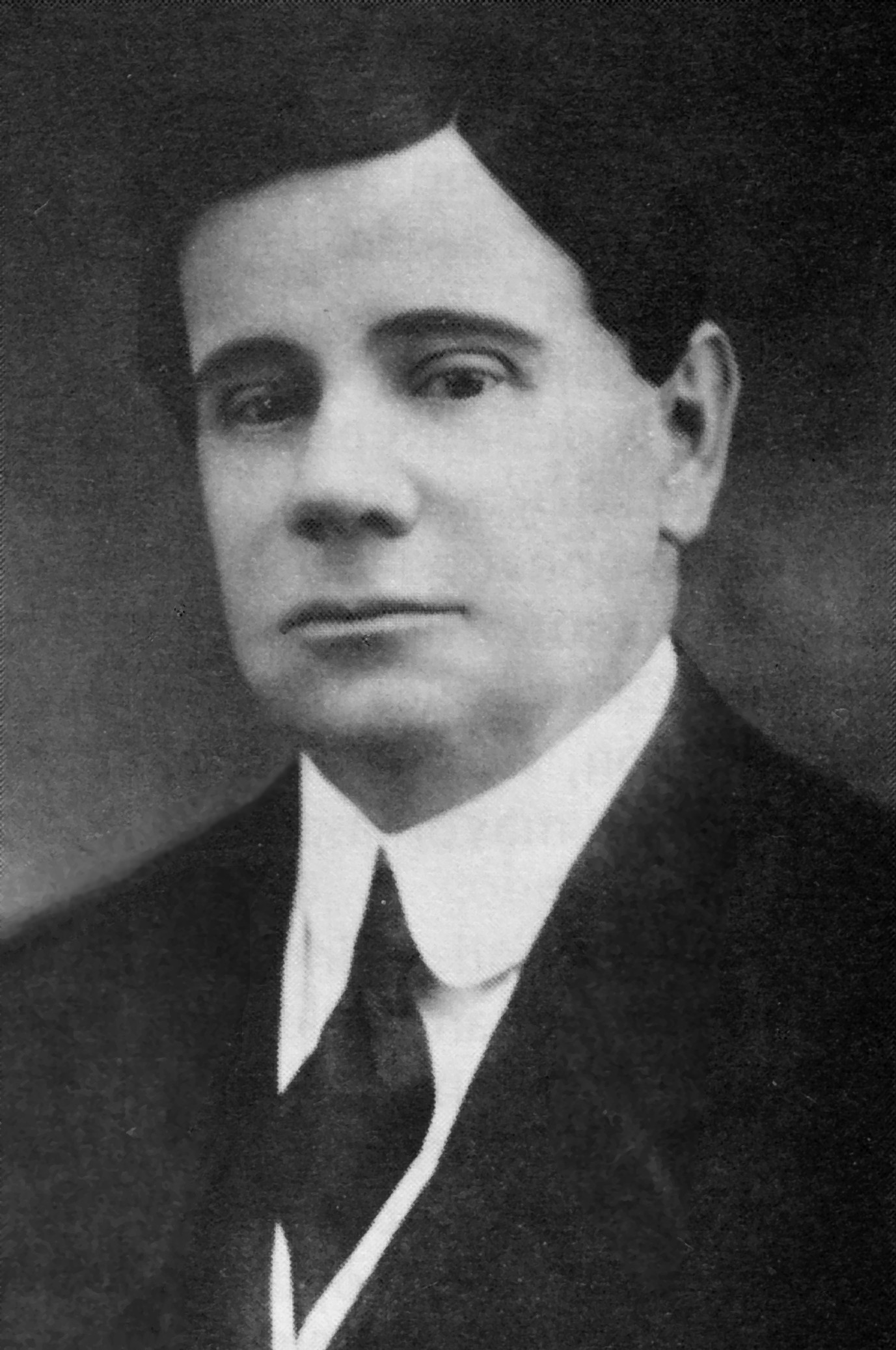
Federico Tinoco

The Political Constitution of Costa Rica of 1917 was a constitution that was in force for two years; from 1917 to 1919. It was promulgated by then dictator Federico Tinoco Granados after the coup d'état that overthrew Alfredo González Flores in 1917. It was drafted by the ex-presidents Bernardo Soto Alfaro, Rafael Iglesias Castro, Ascensión Esquivel Ibarra, Cleto González Víquez and Carlos Durán Cartín. The presidents José Joaquín Rodríguez Zeledón and Ricardo Jiménez Oreamuno were invited to participate in the process as others of their status, but they refused to do so with various excuses.

This constitution has been considered by some scholars as very progressive, partly because of the status of its authors, besides contemplating an itinerary to return to democracy with elections starting in 1922. However, it had an ephemeral existence since Tinoco was overthrown by opposition forces shortly after the murder of his brother. The discredit that ended his regime also affected the reputation of the constitution, which was discarded by the one that had previously lived since 1871.

== History ==
The elections for constituent deputies of 1917 of Costa Rica were held on April 1 of that year at the same time as the presidential elections convened by the de facto president Federico Alberto Tinoco Granados. These elections were held in order to legitimize the regime that was imposed after the coup d'état on January 27 of that same year. As was common in Costa Rica, a Constituent Assembly was convened by the coup leaders after the overthrow of a government, as happened with most constitutions, including the one still in force in 1949. The convocation was made according to the current electoral law and established that the number of deputies would be equal to that of the Parliament (42) and their election by province would also be the same.

Tinoco was a unique candidate without rivals, postulated by the Peliquista Party that gravitated around him. Naturally this party also swept the elections, obtaining 40 of the 42 deputies, the other two being Otilio Ulate Blanco and Otto Cortés Fernández (son of future president León Cortés Castro), elected by the Tinoquista Party.

== Content ==
The Constitution of 1917 established a bicameral parliament with a Congress of Deputies in which each province elected deputies proportionally to its population and a Senate with three senators by province. It also established a series of civil rights and the State duty of protecting the working class.
