= Paseo de los Estudiantes =

- Neighborhood of San Jose
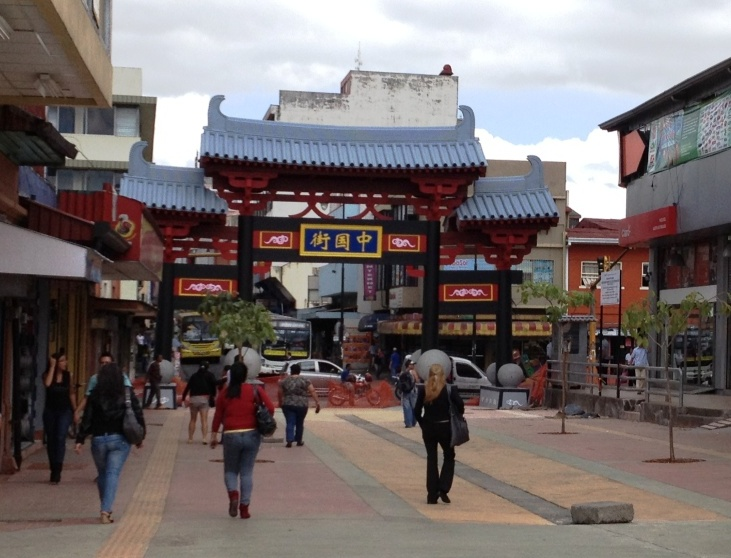
- Chinese Arch, San José, Costa Rica
- Interactive map of Paseo de los Estudiantes
- Coordinates: 9°55′N 84°04′W
- Country: Costa Rica
- Province: San José
- Canton: Catedral
- District: Catedral
- Postal code: 10104
- Area code: Area code 506

Paseo de los Estudiantes
- Traditional Chinese: 聖何塞唐人街
- Simplified Chinese: 圣何塞唐人街
Transcriptions
Standard Mandarin
- Hanyu Pinyin: Shènghésāi tángrénjiē
Yue: Cantonese
- Jyutping: sing3 ho4 coi3 tong4 jan4 gaai1

Paseo de los Estudiantes ("Students Walkway" in English) is an urban area in San José, Costa Rica, the capital of Costa Rica. The area began to develop as a commercial center during the last decades of the twentieth century, basically with the advent of supermarkets, shops and some restaurants whose owners are Chinese.

== Description ==
The Paseo de los Estudiantes area is located in the southern part of the city on 9th Street between 2nd Avenue and 18th Avenue, beginning at the Iglesias de La Soledad and culminating in the facilities of Liceo de Costa Rica. It is named in honor of high school students from Liceo de Costa Rica, the Colegio Superior de Señoritas and Colegio Seminario de San José who opposed the dictatorship of Federico Tinoco Granados (1917–1919), who made the square located in front of the church the center of their protests. In 2012, the Municipality of San Jose built a Barrio Chino (Chinatown) on the same site, the first of its kind in Central America, with the aim of reviving the capital's trade, although the name Paseo de los Estudiantes is still used interchangeably. On April 28, 2016, a monument to student civic movement of 1919, the work of Costa Rican sculptor Edgar Zuniga opened.

== Culture ==
=== Barrio Chino de San José ===
The Chinatown was officially opened on Wednesday 5 December 2012, after nearly ten months of work, with funding from the government of China to promote friendship between the two countries. It is expected to become a new area of touristic interest in the city.

Works began in February 2012, but the planning and design began in 2009 as a result of political negotiations between the governments of Costa Rica and the People’s Republic of China, to create a neighborhood in San Jose to represent Chinese culture.

After a little discussion about the most appropriate location and that have the least impact on traffic flow, they chose the central 9th street, popularly known as "Paseo de los Estudiantes" ("Students Walkway"). The area includes the square of the Iglesia de Nuestra Señora de La Soledad (Church of Solitude) and a little music amphitheater.

The neighborhood is an area of about 550 meters long and 8200 meters² building, in an area of twelve city blocks between 2nd Avenue and 14th Avenue (north to south) and between 7th and 11th Street (in west to east direction). The central axis constitutes a boulevard or stamped concrete walkway in red and yellow colors (symbolizing good luck and prosperity respectively in Chinese culture), along 9th Street.

Undoubtedly, its most notable architectural work is the arched entrance, similar to others located in other cities around the world. The work was performed by employees of a Chinese company, linked to the Beijing Bureau of Antiquities and is estimated to cost approximately $500,000. The bow is made of reinforced concrete, is 10 meters high and 15 wide, with enough internal space for a firetruck to pass, in case of emergency. Although inspired by the Tang dynasty, is also integrated eight areas of concrete spheres symbolize existing Pre-Columbian art of Costa Rica, as a way to symbolize the union of cultures.

The boulevard ends at 14th Avenue with a statue of Confucius in human size, located on a small pedestal. Although it was initially announced that it would build a second arc at the end of the boulevard (with the support of the Chinese community in Costa Rica), this was finally dismissed for reasons that were disclosed.

The works also involved a new sewer and installation of underground electrical wiring.

Initially, the work was estimated at a cost of around CRC 600 million colones (just over a million US dollars). He said that this work was done with the donation of $1 million provided by the government of China, and ¢200 million from the Municipality of San José.

Finally, although precise figures were not provided, the total cost of the buildings is estimated between $1.5 and $2 million, contributed mainly by the Chinese government.

The creation of this area was controversial from the very beginning. One common criticism was the comparatively low presence of Asian property owners in that area of the city, despite the fairly significant concentration of local citizens of Asian origin. However, the Asian population remains mixed with Costa Ricans, who are the majority. This trend is expected to change over time.

Another point of contention was the creation of the neighborhood on a street popularly known as "Paseo de los Estudiantes" (Students' Walk), which begins at the emblematic Church of Our Lady of Solitude. Some conservatives questioned whether the project promoted disrespect for the character and religious traditions that have been rooted in the church for more than a century.

Furthermore, the original street name has historical significance to Costa Ricans, because it refers to students of Liceo de Costa Rica who fought against dictatorship and corruption. The name also refers to the daily transit of thousands of young people on their way to their schools for over a hundred years.

A final point of contention was the impact on the road network of the city, which was already swamped with traffic. 9th Street was an important artery of transportation to the southern end of the capital, and its absence has caused an increased traffic in the surrounding streets, especially during rush hour.

== See also ==
- Chinese people in Costa Rica
