= 1917 Costa Rican general election =

- 1 April 1917
- Presidential election
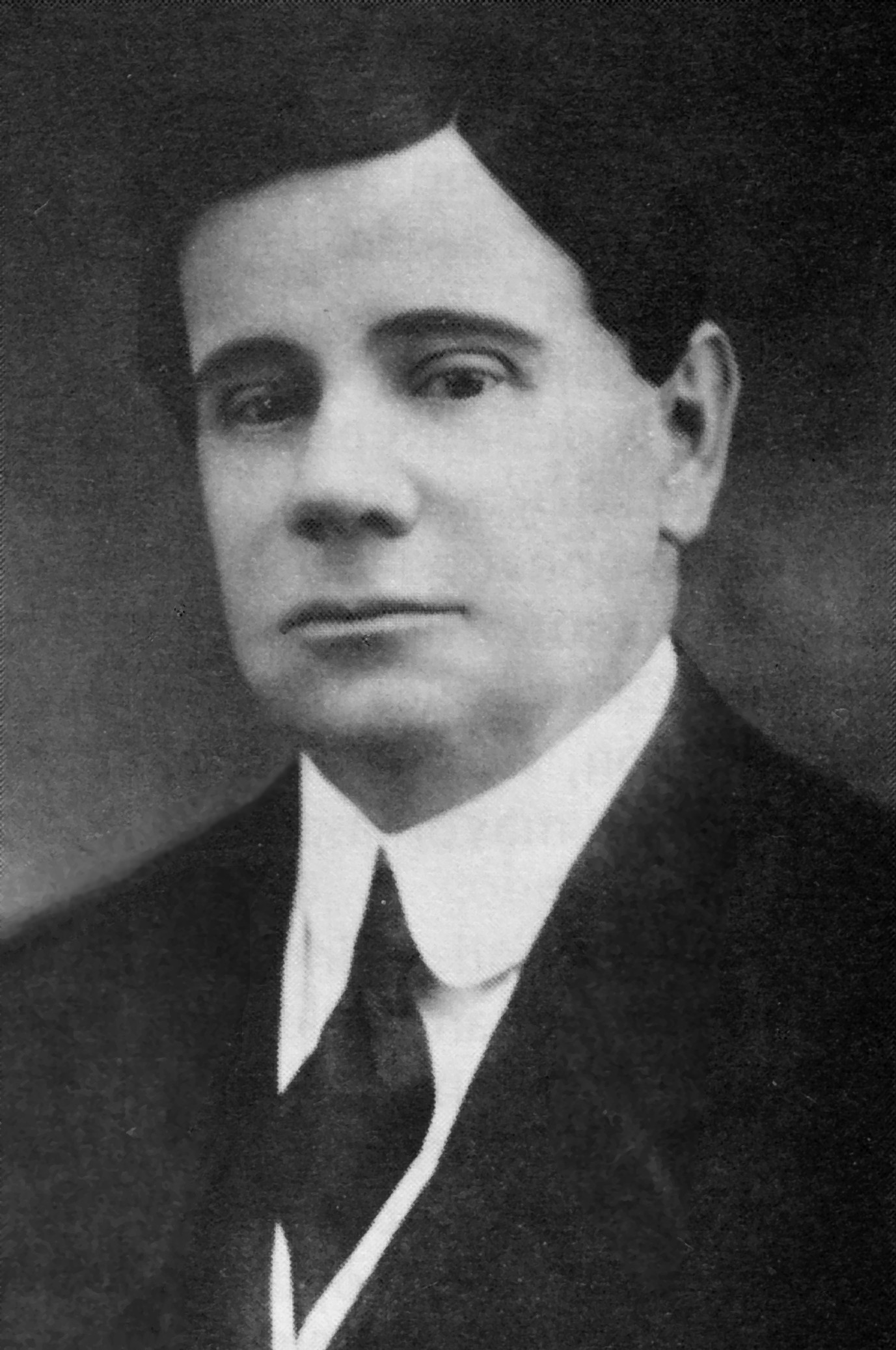
Nominee	Federico Tinoco Granados
Party	Peliquista
Popular vote	61,214
Percentage	100%
President before election
Federico Tinoco Granados
Peliquista
Elected President
Federico Tinoco Granados
Peliquista
- Constituent Assembly election
- All 42 seats in the National Constituent Assembly; 22 seats needed for a majority
Party	Leader	Vote %	Seats	+/–
Peliquista	Federico Tinoco Granados		40	New
Tinoquista	Otilio Ulate Blanco; Otto Cortés Fernández		2	New
This lists parties that won seats. See the complete results below.

General elections were held in Costa Rica on 1 April 1917. General Federico Tinoco Granados had illegally seized power in a military coup that January and stood as the sole candidate in the presidential election. The elections were widely regarded as fraudulent, with Tinoco as the only official candidate. Although former president Rafael Yglesias Castro received 259 votes, they were recorded as invalid ballots.

Tinoco’s regime enjoyed the support of the intellectual elite, as well as the coffee and banking oligarchy, sectors that had been negatively impacted by the reforms of President Alfredo González Flores. He also counted on the backing of key political figures, including (at least initially) Republican Party leader Máximo Fernández Alvarado and journalist Otilio Ulate Blanco. The Army, commanded by Tinoco’s brother José Joaquín Tinoco Granados, initially offered him unconditional loyalty. The regime garnered significant popular support early on, with a pro-Tinoquista demonstration on 18 March 1917 drawing an estimated 25,000 participants across San José.

Following the coup, Tinoco called for presidential and legislative elections to form a National Constituent Assembly tasked with drafting a new constitution, mirroring the approach of previous regimes born from coups in 1859, 1869 and 1871. The elections were conducted under the existing Electoral Law, maintaining the same number of deputies (42) and provincial distribution as the previous Constitutional Congress. The ruling party won all but two seats in the Assembly, allowing conservative sympathizers such as Ulate and Otto Cortés Fernández (son of future president León Cortés) to participate.

== Results ==
=== President ===
Candidate	Party	Votes	%
Federico Tinoco Granados	Peliquista Party	61,214	100.00
Total		61,214	100.00
Valid votes		61,214	98.30
Invalid/blank votes		1,058	1.70
Total votes		62,272	100.00
Registered voters/turnout		91,079	68.37
Source: Nohlen, TSE

=== National Constituent Assembly ===
Party	Seats	+/–
Peliquista Party	40	New
Tinoquista Party	2	New
Total	42	–
Source: Nohlen, TSE
