= 1919 Costa Rican general election =

- 7 December 1919
- Presidential election
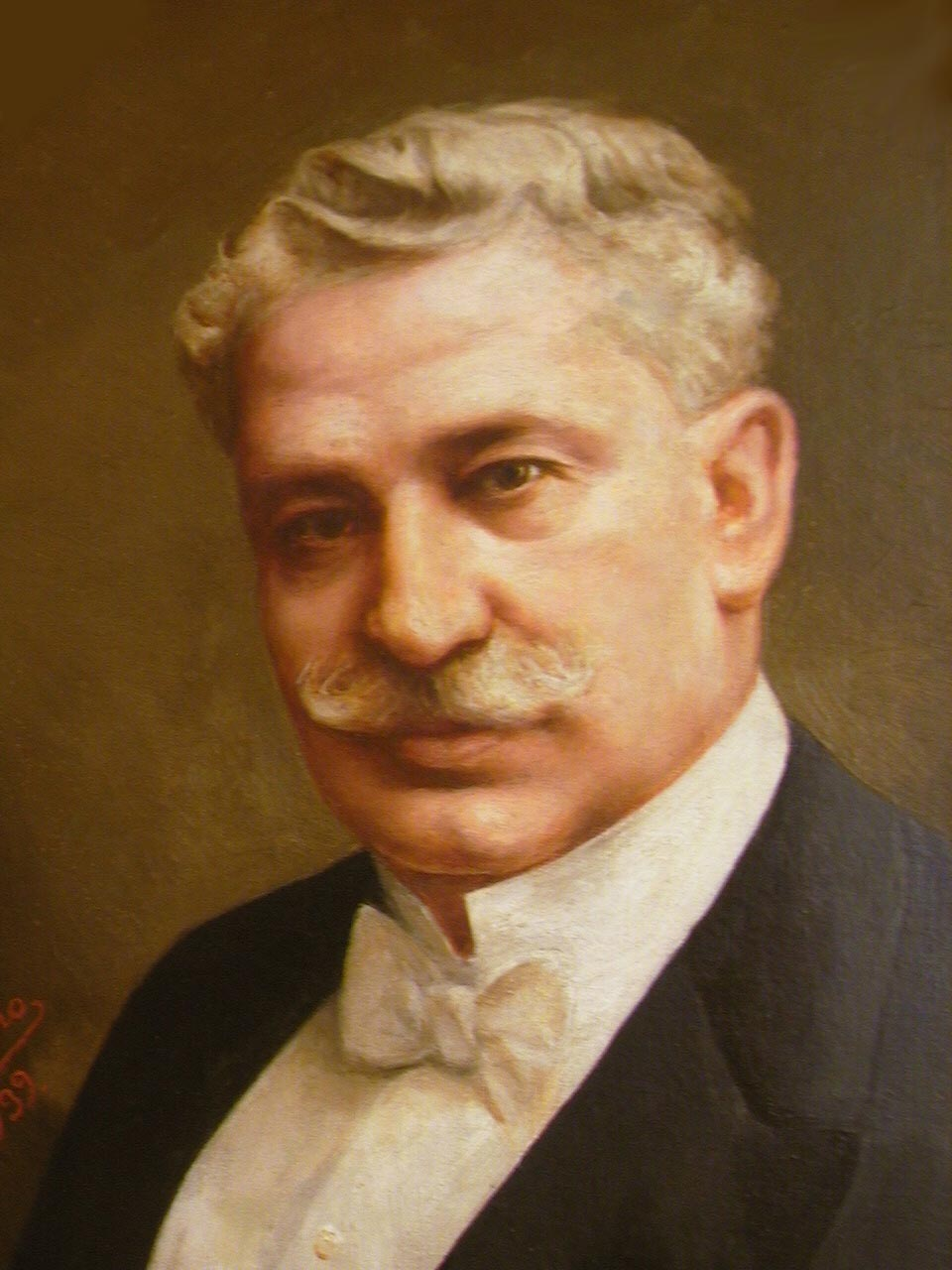

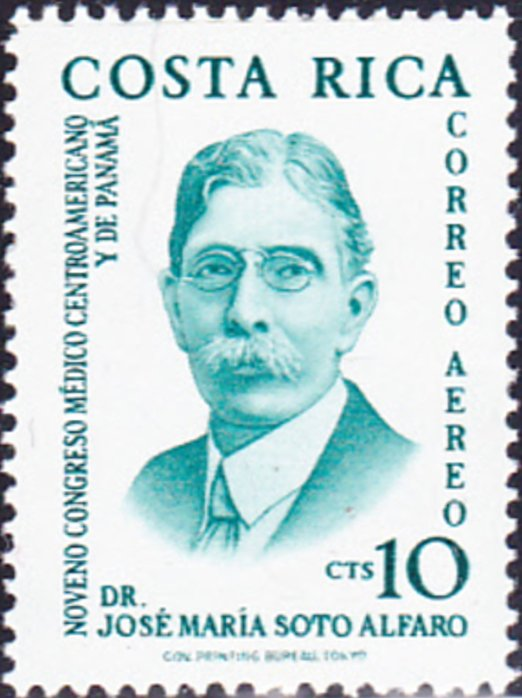
Nominee	Julio Acosta García	José María Soto Alfaro
Party	Constitutional	Democratic
Popular vote	43,283	4,884
Percentage	89.85%	10.14%
- Official results by province
President before election
Francisco Aguilar Barquero
Republican
Elected President
Julio Acosta García
Constitutional
- Parliamentary election
- All 43 seats in the Constitutional Congress; 22 seats needed for a majority
Party	Leader	Vote %	Seats	+/–
Constitutional	Julio Acosta García	75.88	42	New
Democratic	José María Soto Alfaro	8.44	1	New
This lists parties that won seats. See the complete results below.

General elections were held in Costa Rica on 7 December 1919 to elect the president and all members of the Constitutional Congress. Opposition leader Julio Acosta García of the Constitutional Party won the presidential election, whilst the party also won the parliamentary election, in which they received 75% of the vote.

These elections were held after dictator Federico Tinoco Granados was deposed and exiled. The winning candidate Acosta, former chancellor of the government overthrown by Tinoco, had been precisely one of his fierce opponents and leader of armed antitinoquist groups which earned him great popularity, this despite the fact that his affiliation as a Freemason and Theosophist were controversial, at least among some sectors of the Church.

The tinoquismo grouped around the recently founded Democratic Party and nominated Dr. José Maria Soto Alfaro, denoted tinoquista, twice deputy and brother of former president Bernardo Soto Alfaro. Soto was also the founder of the so-called "Club 27 de Enero" (27 January Club) whose name commemorated the Tinoquista coup on 27 January 1917 that overthrew González Flores and was one of the supporters of the Tinoquista regime.

== Results ==
=== President ===
Candidate	Party	Votes	%
Julio Acosta García	Constitutional Party	43,283	89.85
José María Soto Alfaro	Democratic Party	4,884	10.14
Francisco Aguilar Barquero		3	0.01
Alberto Echandi Montero		2	0.00
Alfredo González Flores		2	0.00
Total		48,174	100.00
Registered voters/turnout		84,283	–
Source: Nohlen, TSE

=== By province ===
Province	Acosta	Soto
San José Province	12,771	774
Alajuela	10,561	1,903
Cartago Province	8,055	84
Heredia	3,438	658
Guanacaste	4,177	1,076
Puntarenas	2,600	389
Limón	1,681	0
Total	43,283	4,884
Source: TSE

=== Parliament ===
Party	Votes	%	Seats
Constitutional Party	26,751	74.88	42
Democratic Party	3,014	8.44	1
Acostista	2,183	6.11	0
Constitucional	1,911	5.35	0
Unión provincial	1,123	3.14	0
Obrero acostista	616	1.72	0
Constitucional obrero	106	0.30	0
Acostista conciliador	20	0.06	0
Total	35,724	100.00	43
Valid votes	35,724	99.47	
Invalid/blank votes	190	0.53	
Total votes	35,914	100.00	
Registered voters/turnout	84,987	42.26	
Source: Nohlen (votes)
