= Figuerism =

Political and ideological movement in Costa Rica

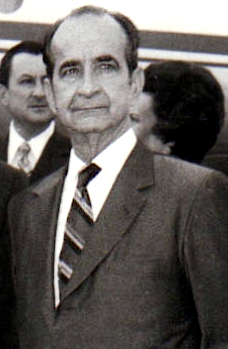
José Figueres Ferrer, after whom figuerism is named

Figuerism or Figuerismo is a political and ideological movement, originating in Costa Rica, of social democracy and democratic socialism. It was founded by José Figueres Ferrer, who was president of Costa Rica on three occasions: as de facto ruler, following the Costa Rican revolution, between 1948 and 1949, and then as democratically elected president twice, from 1953–1958 and 1970–1974. Several Costa Rican political parties proclaim themselves to be continuators of Figuerism and its most faithful representative, including the National Liberation Party, Citizens' Action Party and the Patriotic Alliance. All of these parties pay homage to the figure of José Figueres and have personalities in their ranks who were close to the former president and often used to be figueristas.

Figueres is remembered for, among other things, having respected the "Social Guarantees" (a series of social reforms beneficial to the popular classes, enacted in the Calderón administration and kept by Figueres after winning the war), abolished the army, nationalized the four largest banks, approved women's suffrage, ended racial segregation (until 1949, black people had no right to vote or leave certain areas) and created the Costa Rican Institute of Electricity.

The centenary of his birth, on September 25, 2006, was celebrated by both the government, chaired by Óscar Arias of the National Liberation Party, and in the Legislative Assembly, by the (then) main opposition force, the Citizens' Action Party.

== Ideology ==
José Figueres Ferrer proclaimed himself an adherent of utopian socialism and developed a particularly Creole and native form of Costa Rican socialism which is difficult to define in international standards. He was a member of the Democratic Action group, which was part of the Democratic Party, which opposed the Christian socialist government of Rafael Ángel Calderón Guardia, who was allied to the Costa Rican Communist Party. He led the revolution against Calderón after the elections in 1948 were canceled by the Constitutional Congress on the basis of electoral irregularities, when Calderón was defeated by the opposition candidate (and future ally of Calderón) Otilio Ulate. Figueres then commanded the National Liberation Army, who emerged victorious in the civil war.

In 1953, the Center for the Study of National Problems and Democratic Action merged, becoming the National Liberation Party. Figueres was its first candidate and its first democratically elected president. The Center drew upon social democratic thought of the time, particularly that of Haya de la Torre. Figuerismo is not synonymous with liberationism, the ideology that revolves around the National Liberation Party and which has a varied archipelago of internal factions and beliefs.

== Parties ==
The political tradition of the National Liberation Party is known as "liberationism" (liberacionismo) and should not be confused with Figuerism, although Figuerism is a faction within liberationism. Different factions exist within the PLN, which are not always friendly with each other, such as arismo (linked to the Arias Sánchez family) and mongismo (linked to the Araya-Monge family).

Both Figueres Ferrer and his son, José María Figueres Olsen, were presidents of the Republic, representing the PLN. Other figures, such as former deputy and former first lady, Karen Olsen Beck, and Figueres Ferrer's daughter, Muni Figueres, are still PLN members.

PLN's main rival, the Citizens' Action Party, was founded by a variety of individuals, many of whom originated from the PLN. PAC counts among its members various figueristas, such as writer Alberto Cañas Escalante, one of its founders, who was close to Figueres Ferrer, and Josette Altmann Borbón, former first lady, who was Figueres Ferrer's daughter-in-law and wife of Figueres Olsen. Another figuerista is President Luis Guillermo Solís Rivera, who left the PLN for the PAC over the PLN'S support of CAFTA. Mariano Figueres Olsen (Figueres Ferrer's son and leader of the Patriotic Alliance party) left the PLN at the same time as Solis Rivera; they joined different, but allied, parties.
