= 1938 Costa Rican parliamentary election =

Mid-term parliamentary elections were held in Costa Rica on 13 April 1938. The result was a victory for the National Republican Party, which received 62% of the vote. Voter turnout was 71%.

== Results ==
Party	Votes	%	Seats
National Republican Party	54,557	62.08	16
Workers and Farmers Party	10,187	11.59	2
Republicano Independiente	6,453	7.34	1
Confraternidad Guanacasteca	4,678	5.32	1
Republicano Provincial	3,921	4.46	0
Independiente Nacional	3,753	4.27	1
Republicano Nacional progresista	2,658	3.02	0
Unión Mora y Turrubares	721	0.82	0
Demócrata Independiente	610	0.69	0
Nacional Demócrata	339	0.39	0
Total	87,877	100.00	21
Valid votes	87,877	99.86	
Invalid/blank votes	127	0.14	
Total votes	88,004	100.00	
Registered voters/turnout	124,289	70.81	
Source: Nohlen
