= Peliquista Party =

Costa Rican political group

Peliquista Party Partido Peliquista
- Leader: Federico Tinoco Granados
- Founded: 1917
- Dissolved: 1919
- Succeeded by: Democratic Party
- Headquarters: San José, Costa Rica
- Ideology: Nationalism; Personalismo; Authoritarianism; Liberalism
- Political position: Right-wing
- Colors: Blue Red

The Peliquista Party was a Costa Rican political group, active between 1917 and 1919 during the Tinoco Brothers dictatorship following the 1917 Costa Rican coup d'état.

== History ==
=== 1917 elections ===
The Peliquista Party emerged to participate in the elections of April 1917 to elect the President of the Republic and deputies for a Constituent Assembly. Its name derives from the nickname of "Pelico" with which the Provisional Head of the Republic was known, Federico Tinoco Granados, who was the party's presidential candidate and that election's sole candidate.

Tinoco won an overwhelming majority in Congress managing to elect practically all the members of the constituent assembly, with the exception of two from Alajuela, Otilio Ulate Blanco and Claudio Cortés Castro, elected by the "Tinoquista Party".

The Peliquista Party lacked formal organization and neither had a defined ideology nor program. It was a group of eminently personalist nature.

=== 1919 elections ===
For the legislative and municipal elections of March 1919, the Peliquista Party was the only one that participated and its lists were imposed throughout the national territory, so that the peliquismo had unanimity in both houses of Congress. Only a few independent candidates were elected for some isolated municipal posts.

According to the official results, 47,584 votes were cast for deputies and senators and 47,531 for councilmen, mayors and vice-mayors. The government newspaper La Información announced that the citizens had used the right of suffrage within the most perfect order and under the sign of tranquility, sanity and good harmony. However, citizen participation was lower than that of the 1917 election. In an interview with La Información, Tinoco said that while absentee propaganda circulated inside and out, he preferred to remain silent because he trusted the people, and He added that the superiority of the ruling party is true and effective. He also expressed his satisfaction with the individuals chosen to integrate the Houses, "democratically elected and without any opposition." A few months later he said that the elections were held "... with the greatest order and with the widest freedom, and their results were highly satisfactory, because despite the campaign of abstentionism undertaken by government opponents and the natural difficulties of implementing the Citizenship card now indispensable for the exercise of suffrage, many votes were collected at all ballot boxes and once again proved, given the affiliation of the winning ballots in them, the powerful support with which our current political regime has in opinion freely manifested".

=== Dissolution ===
The Peliquista Party disappeared following the resignation of President Tinoco in August 1919 and the dissolution of the Congress, which took place on September 2 following the breakdown of the constitutional order. Never again participated in an election.
