= Dictatorship of the Tinoco brothers =

1917–1919 government in Costa Rica

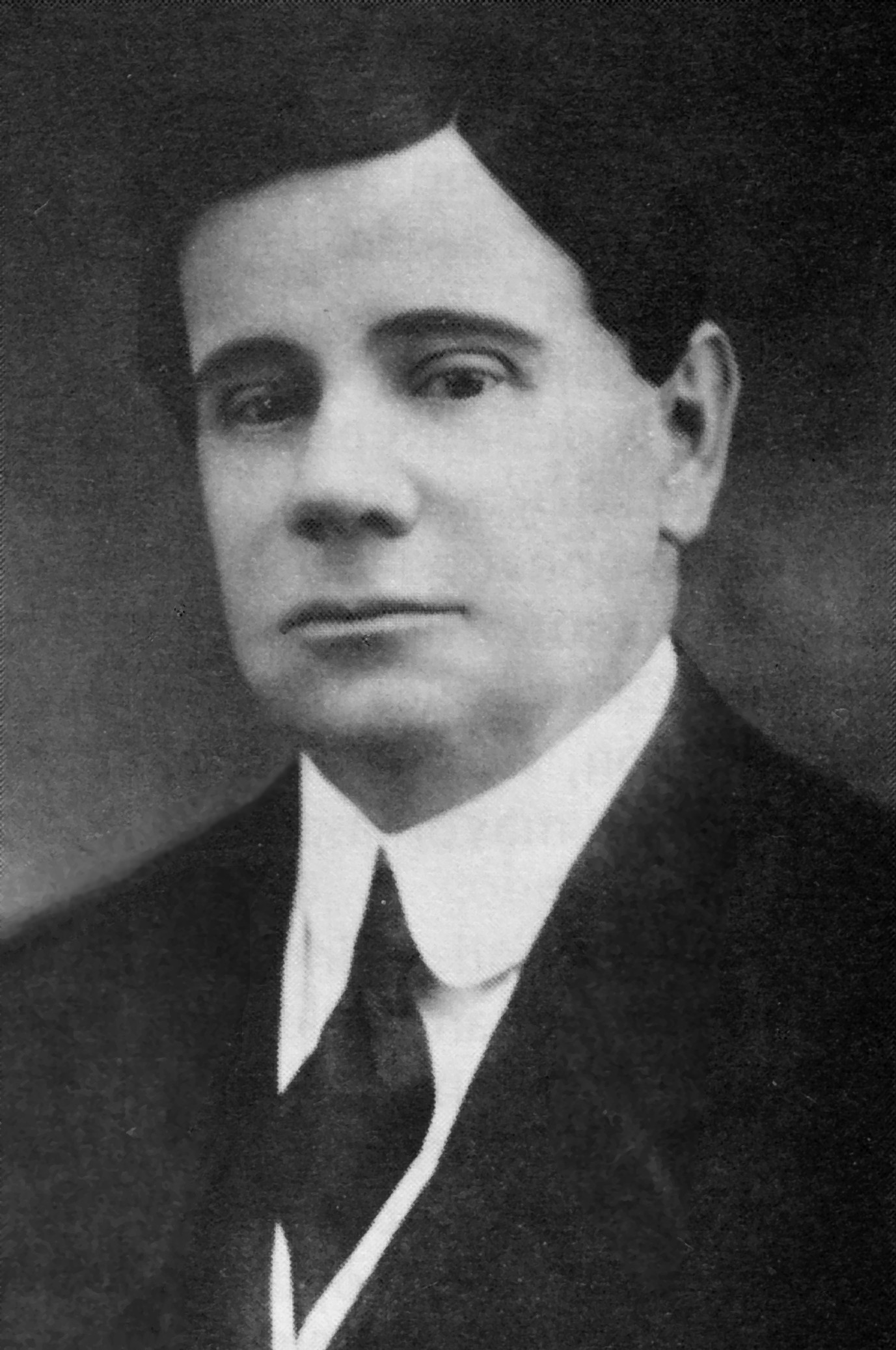
- Presidency of Federico Tinoco; 27 January 1917 – 12 August 1919
- President: Federico Tinoco Granados
- Party: Peliquista Party
- Seat: San José
- Coat of arms of Costa Rica

The Dictatorship of the Tinoco brothers, also Tinochist or Peliquist (as Federico Tinoco was nicknamed "Pelico") Dictatorship, or Tinoco regime is the period of Costa Rica in which the military dictatorship led by Federico Tinoco Granados as de facto president and his brother José Joaquín Tinoco Granados as Minister of War was in place. It began after the 1917 Costa Rican coup d'état on January 27, 1917, and culminated with the departure of Tinoco from Costa Rica to France on August 13, 1919 three days after the murder of his brother and after a series of armed insurrections and massive civil protests known as the Sapoá Revolution and the 1919 student civic movement.

== Background ==
Alfredo González Flores was appointed president of Costa Rica by the vote of Constitutional Congress as stipulated in the Constitution then in force after the political agreement between the candidates who participated in the 1913 election: Máximo Fernández Alvarado and Carlos Durán Cartín. Shortly after his government began on May 8, 1917, World War I began causing a serious economic crisis due to Costa Rican dependence on the export of products to the great powers now at war.

González also applied a series of progressive measures that generated the wrath of the powerful Costa Rican business oligarchy, including the creation of the first public bank (banking was a private monopoly of the oligarchy) the International Bank of Costa Rica, a tax reform that taxed 15 % of the large capital, the Cadastre Law that sought to properly value the value of the properties and its veto to the Pinto-Greulich oil concession signed between the Secretary of Development Enrique Pinto and the American tycoon Leo Greulich that would allow his company West India Oil Company to exploit Costa Rican oil wells.

The popular discontent over the economic crisis and the fury on the part of the powerful classes allowed Gonzalez' Minister of the Navy, Federico Tinoco to carry out a coup on January 27, 1917 with full support (at least originally) of the oligarchy, the Church and the Army.

== Legitimation efforts ==
After the coup, Tinoco tried to give legitimacy to his government by calling the presidential elections of 1917, although with him as a single candidate and his party, the Peliquista Party (formed to sustain the regime and legal only) as a single party. He also convened a Constituent Assembly that discussed a new constitution drafted by a board made up of prominent former presidents (although not all former presidents agreed to participate).

Having finished this process and promulgated the new constitution, the regime called elections to fill the newly created Senate and Chamber of Deputies of Costa Rica, although again the elections took place in an environment of political authoritarianism and without opposition.

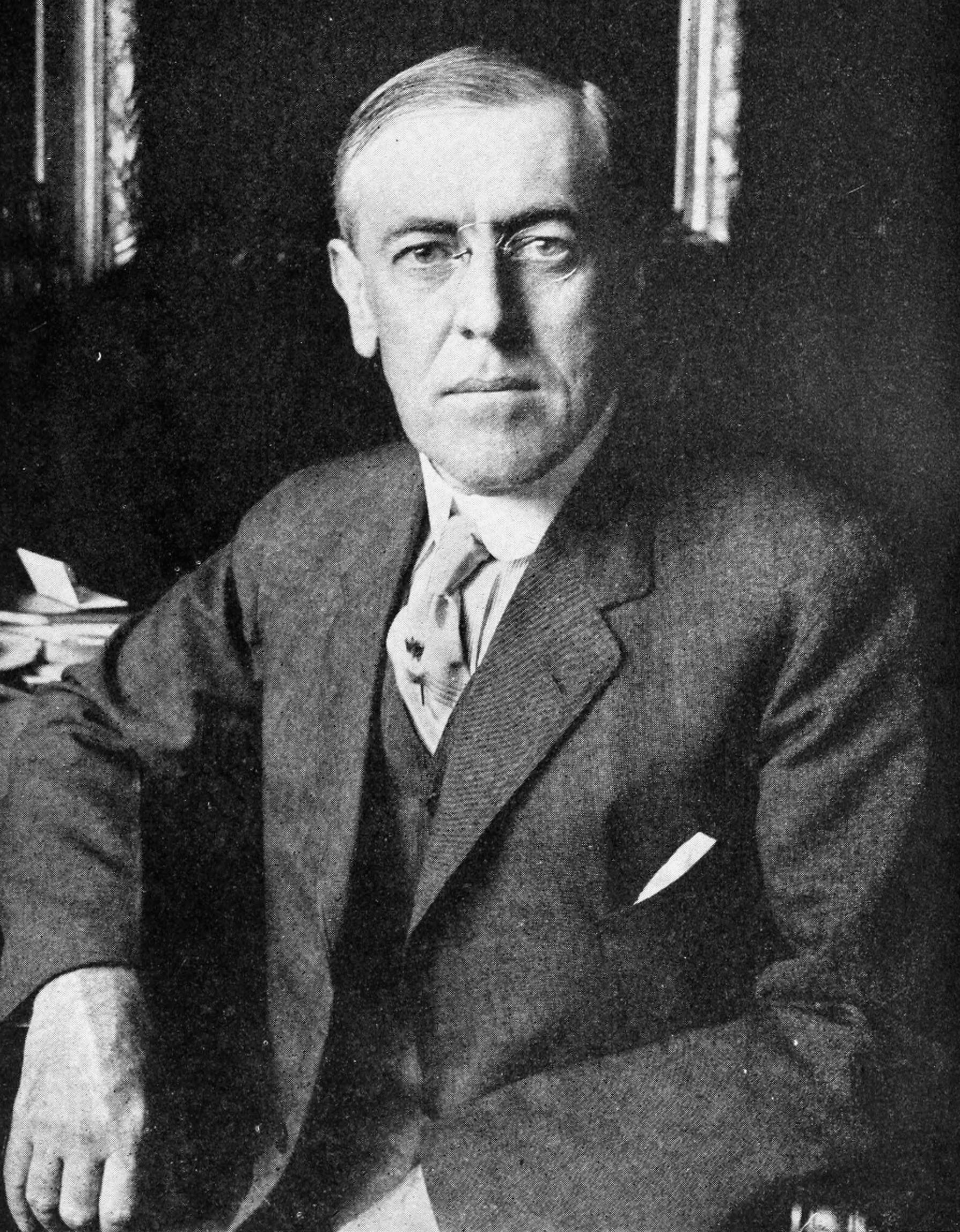
Woodrow Wilson

== Los esbirros ==
The secret police created by Cleto González Víquez for internal security was used by Tinoco to repress the opposition and terrorize the civilian population. Nicknamed Los Esbirros "the minions", the Tinoquist agents had the task of identifying and arresting opponents, applying torture and in some cases executions.

== Foreign policy ==
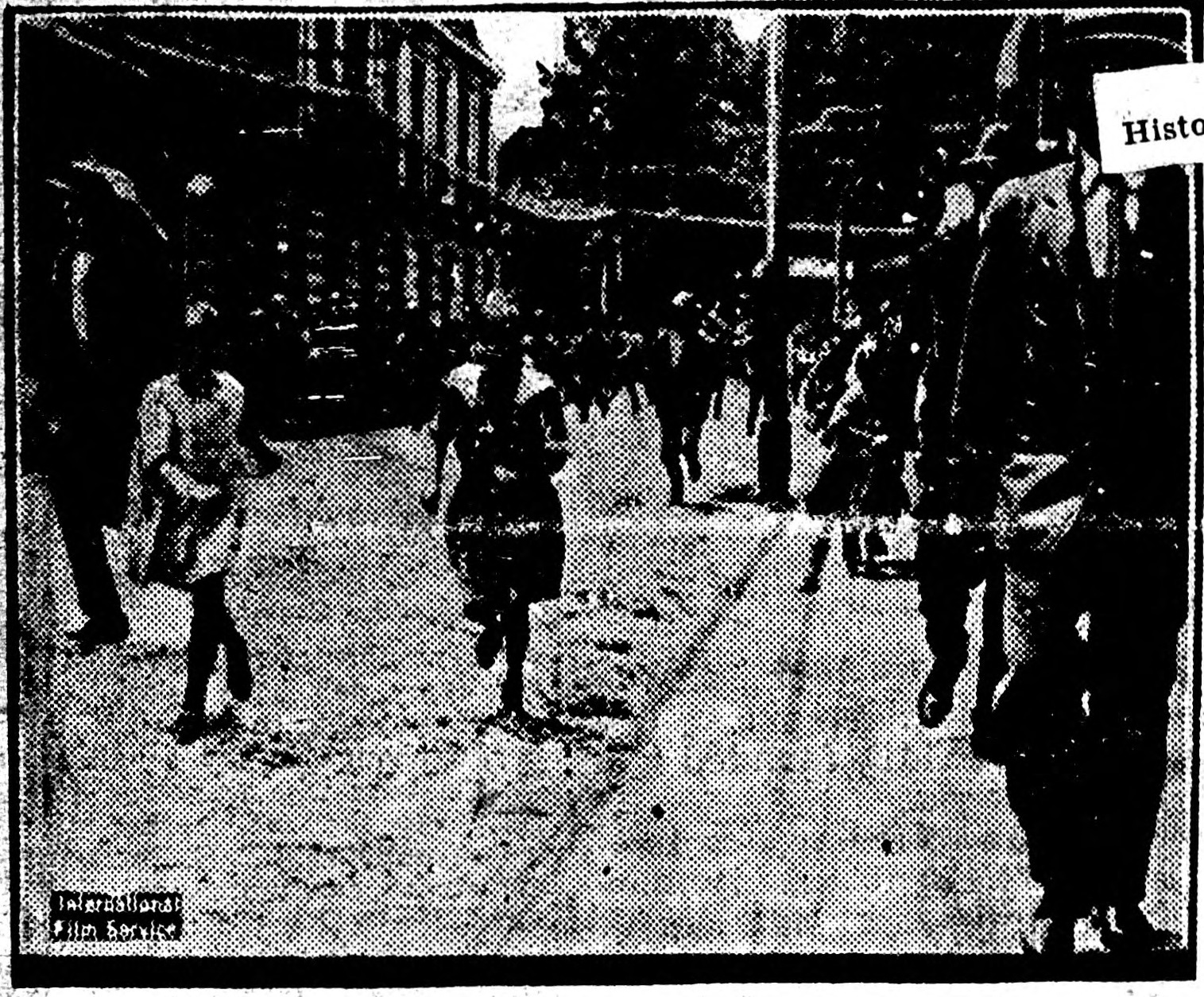
Citizens of San Jose, Costa Rica, fleeing before the troops of President Tinoco - August 1919

The government of Democratic President Woodrow Wilson refused to recognize the coup government and even blocked Costa Rica's participation in the First World War with which Tinoco unsuccessfully sought to ingratiate himself with Washington.

However, the US blockade and the Wilson administration's support for the anti-Tinocist opposition, in addition to the declaration of war that Costa Rica made to the German Empire, served Tinoco to justify the application of martial law and imprison hundreds of opponents without habeas corpus.

== Opposition begins ==
The presentation of two controversial bills by Tinoco; the restoration of the death penalty and the elimination of the direct vote began to subtract support from the regime. Until then the opposition had managed to make itself heard through opposition newspapers such as Diario de Costa Rica, Acción Social and El Liberal that were closed down by the regime increasing popular animosity.

The first anti-Tinoquist demonstrations took place between November 12 and 13, 1918 amid the commemorations for the end of the war. The opponent Stewart Johnson even compares the defeat of the German Kaiser with the imminent defeat of Tinoco and cries of "Death to Tinoco!" And "Down with the government!" were heard. The police violently repressed the demonstrations.

== Human rights violations ==
The Tinochist regime was particularly repressive. In addition to the closure of opposition-owned press and the imprisonment of others, torture and extrajudicial executions were carried out.

The main opponents' prisons were the Bellavista Headquarters and the Central Penitentiary. Tortures that were applied included whipping with "the stick" and the "bladder" (a sun-dried muscle), the use of the stocks in two variants; the high that left the feet in suspense causing cuts in the neck and wrists and sometimes death, and the low that caused exhaustion due to the awkward position. In addition, the cells were in subhuman conditions; dirty, poorly ventilated, wet, full of rats, cockroaches and bedbugs, and a particular type of cell known as "the cloister" where the prisoner could not sit and died from exhaustion. These torments were reserved for political opponents and undisciplined prisoners.

== Uprisings ==
The brothers Alfredo Volio and Jorge Volio and the intellectual Rogelio Fernández Güell attempted armed insurrections against Tinoco in the south of the country that were defeated. Fernández Güell was killed along with Carlos Sanchos, Jeremías Garbanzo, Ricardo Rivera, Salvador Jiménez and Joaquín Porras in Buenos Aires by the esbirros. Salvadoran teacher Marcelino García Flamenco witnessed the crimes and fled to Panama where he reported the facts to the press. García Flamenco returned to the country with other young people to attempt an insurrection that failed in the so-called Battle of the Arriete on July 19, 1919, and was macheted, dragged still alive by a horse and sprayed with kerosene before being burned alive by the Tinoquists. His heroic death is still commemorated both in El Salvador and Costa Rica, especially in La Cruz Canton.

=== Sapoá Revolution ===
The rebellion was organized in Nicaragua by the ex-priest and politician Jorge Volio Jiménez and was composed of Costa Ricans and Nicaraguan and Honduran volunteers. The first battle was fought in the Jobo with the rebels at a huge numerical disadvantage, about 800 against the Tinoquist forces that mobilized around 5000 men. The rebels were defeated and the prisoners (mostly young boys) were killed after torture, including Salvadoran Marcelino García Flamenco.

After the death due to natural causes of Volio, Julio Acosta organized future incursions, which, together with the popular and student protests, led to the collapse of the regime. Julio Acosta assumed leadership.

=== Civic student movement ===
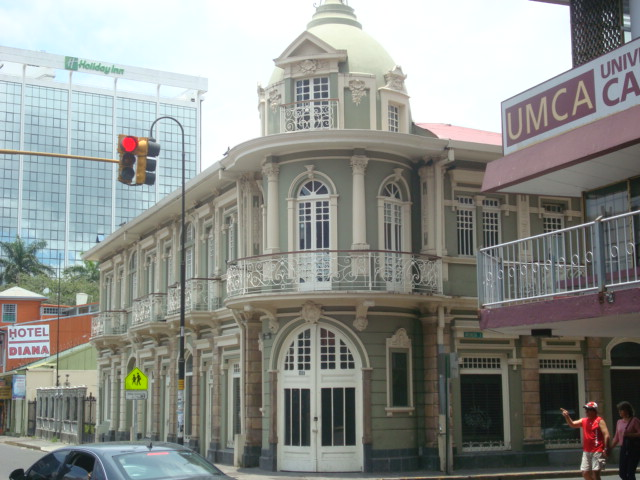
Maroy Building, where once was located La Información newspaper, which was set on fire by protesters.

The 1919 student civic movement was a series of protests and civic struggles that took place in San José, Costa Rica, in June 1919, led by teachers, professors and high school students from the Liceo de Costa Rica, the Colegio Superior de Señoritas and the Colegio Seminario, and supported by the people of San José, against the dictatorship. The civic student movement culminated in the burning of the government-supporting newspapers La Prensa Libre and La Información, which led to a severe repression by the regime and in turn, accelerated the fall of the last military government in the history of Costa Rica.

In memory of this civic day, San José's 9th Street, located in front of the square of the La Soledad Church, is named Paseo de los Estudiantes. In 2016, a monument by the Costa Rican sculptor Édgar Zúñiga was inaugurated to commemorate the events of 1919.

== Fall ==
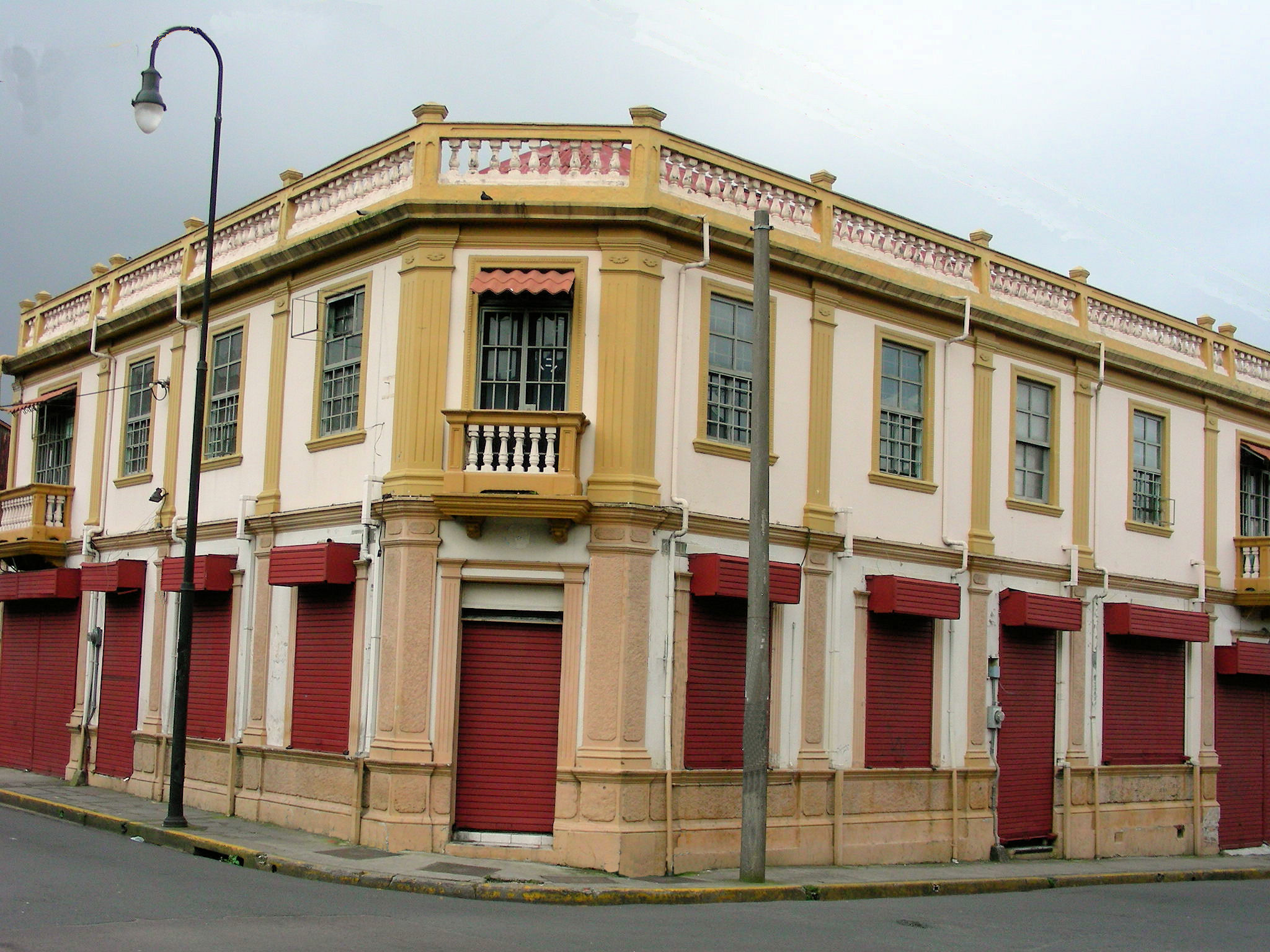
José Joaquín Tinoco's house, where he was murdered in the corner.

Marcelino's murder set fire to public outrage. Julio Acosta García led the armed anti-Tinoco opposition which, together with popular protests, led to the murder of José Joaquín Tinoco and Pelico Tinoco's escape together with his family and close friends and collaborators. Tinoco would die in exile on December 7, 1937.

== Democracy restored ==
Once Tinoco was deposed, Juan Bautista Quirós Segura took over, but was still not recognized by Washington as Quirós had been a member of the Tinoquist regime. Alfredo Gonzalez' Vice President Francisco Aguilar Barquero was called to take the presidency as the legitimate appointee of the pre-coup order as Washington requested.

The Tinochist constitution was repealed by restoring the Costa Rican Political Constitution of 1871 and calls for general elections that were easily won by the leader of the anti-Tinoco opposition Julio Acosta García of the Constitutional Party. His opponent was the Tinoquista doctor and brother of former president Bernardo Soto Alfaro, José María Soto Alfaro whose candidacy had no chance but was allowed to give legitimacy to Acosta's election.

== Analysis ==
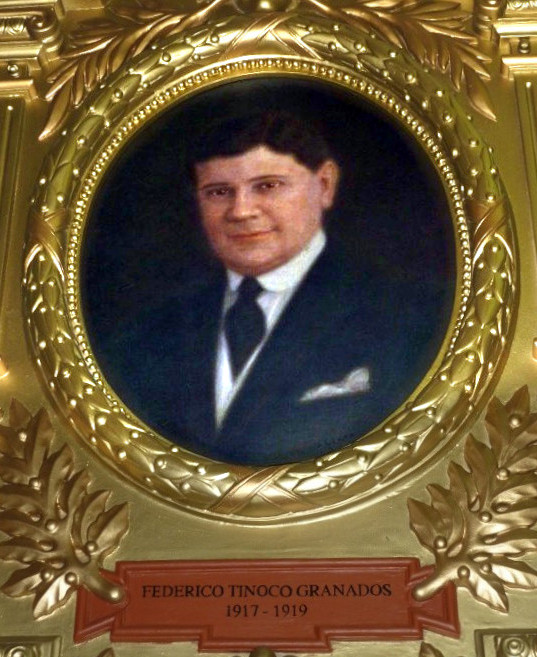
Tinoco's official portrait

Tinoco's figure became synonymous with authoritarianism and dictatorship in Costa Rica and became something like the villain of Costa Rican history, to the point that even the presence of his portrait in the Presidents Hall of the Legislative Assembly of Costa Rica has been controversial. It is practically the only dictatorship that Costa Ricans remember despite the existence of other previous authoritarian governments especially in the nineteenth century (Samuel Stone says that only two governments could be considered genuinely dictatorships in Costa Rica; Tomás Guardia and Tinoco). Although there was a further rupture of the constitution order with the Civil War of 1948, the subsequent de facto government of José Figueres is not usually considered a dictatorship because it handed over power 18 months later as agreed. Tinoco became the only dictator of Costa Rican history throughout the twentieth century, something unusual in Latin America. However, unlike other dictatorships such as the military dictatorship of Chile, the Guatemalan genocide, the National Reorganization Process and the Civic-military dictatorship of Uruguay, the Tinoco dictatorship and its events are not thoroughly studied or commemorated in Costa Rican society, perhaps because of its brevity and remoteness in time.

== See also ==
- Costa Rican Civil War – 1948
