= Social Guarantees =

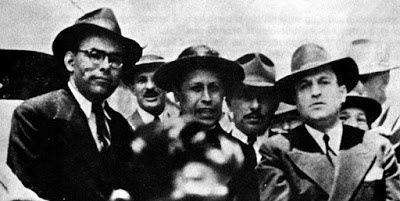

Social Guarantees were a series of progressive political reforms made in Costa Rica in the 1940s for the benefit of the working classes. They came about as a result of the alliance between various political and religious figures. Though a widespreads effort, there were three main leaders:

- Rafael Ángel Calderón Guardia, president in the 1940–1944 period and leader of the National Republican Party. He led the eponymous political movement known as Calderonismo.
- Manuel Mora Valverde, deputy and leader of the Costa Rican Communist Party.
- Víctor Manuel Sanabria Martínez, archbishop of San José and leader of the Catholic Church in Costa Rica.

The reforms were diverse and varied, but are typified by three signature project:

- Creation of the Costa Rican Social Security Fund, a government-funded, private company that universalized healthcare. The Savings Bank required all employers to insure their workers and make a corresponding payment to the worker-employer's quota. This allowed the employee, as well as the employee's spouse and immediate ascending and descending family, to receive healthcare by half of the services of the Fund. All minors under the age of 18 who were resident in the country, without distinction of nationality, were automatically insured by the state. Uninsured persons (unemployed, for example) also received the services of the Caja (short for Caja Costarricense de Seguro Social, the Spanish name for the company) on credit, generally at a lower cost than existing private medical services. Most key elements of this signature project are still in place as of 2023.
- Creation of the University of Costa Rica, which provides higher education to Costa Ricans which reconstituted and expanded upon the University of Santo Tomás which was closed by an anti-clerical government in 1888. The UCR has been ranked as the best university in Central America and as one of the best in the world.
- Promulgation of the Labor Code, a labor law that covered all workers in Costa Rica. The Labor Code set forth workers' rights that were unique in Latin America at the time, including the minimum wage, eight-hour workday, holidays, vacations, social charges, Aguinaldo (compulsory Christmas bonus), double payment of salary to work on holidays, the right to strike and severance payments in case of being dismissed without justification, as well as the specific reasons for which an employee can be dismissed without severance pay. Many elements of this pioneering law remain in force.

These reforms were included in a specific chapter of the Political Constitution.

== The Civil War ==
The Social Guarantees generated great popular support but also brought the ire and intense opposition of the most powerful classes including the coffee oligarchy, the creole aristocracy, and some intellectual sectors. It also raised distrust on the part of the US government that disapproved of Calderon's relationship with communism. A series of measures taken by the Calderonista government swelled the ranks of the opposition, especially the persecution of Germans and Italians during and after World War II, including the confiscation of property and their detention in concentration camps after Costa Rica declared war on the Third Reich. Accusations of electoral fraud, corruption, and repression of political and social opponents strengthened that opposition.

Otilio Ulate Blanco, a journalist and a conservative politician; and León Cortés Castro, an ex-president who had served in Calderon's own Republican Party but defected. Cortés even ran as an opposition candidate in 1944. Cortés has been accused of sympathies for fascism and anti-Semitism. During his government, Cortés persecuted Jews and communists, the antithesis of Calderón who was an ally of the Communist Party and who oppressed Costa Ricans of German and Italian descent after declaring war on fascism.

In the 1948 general election, the Victory Bloc was the coalition of Calderón, reformists and Communists, the latter as part of the Popular Front that arose in several nations around the same time. The Victory Bloc nominated Calderón for the second time and the opposition supported Ulate, with both sides accused of widespread electoral fraud. When no candidate earned the required number of votes to form a government, the stage was set for civil war.

The opposition camp was led by José Figueres, commander of the National Liberation Army. Key allies for Figueres were the Caribbean Legion and Frank Marshall, the leader of the anti-communist forces with dual Costa Rican and German citizenship whose family had been persecuted by Calderón. That coalition prevailed in the civil war and Calderonismo was defeated. Calderón escaped into exile in Nicaragua, then to Mexico where Mora Valverde had also emigrated. Mora led the Workers, Peasants and Intellectuals Bloc, the future Communist Party of Costa Rica. Before the civil war had concluded, Mora and Figueres negotiated the Pact of Ochomogo and the Pact of the Embassy of Mexico. On behalf of the communists, Mora committed to surrender; in return, Figueres promised not to revert the hard-won Social Guarantees.

This seemed reasonable since Figueres himself, who exercised the de facto presidency before passing power to Otilio Ulate, made a series of socialist and progressive reforms. These included the creation of the Costa Rican Institute of Electricity, women's suffrage, the end of racial segregation (before 48 blacks could not leave certain areas or vote), the nationalization of the country's bank, and the abolition of the army. That is why it is generally accepted in Costa Rican historiography that the four great social reformers of the country were Rafael Ángel Calderón Guardia, Manuel Mora Valverde, José Figueres Ferrer and Víctor Manuel Sanabria Martínez. The first three created their own ideologies of transcendence throughout history such as Calderonismo, Figuerismo and communismo a la tica (tico-style communism).

Figueres said he was visited by several representatives of the most conservative business, including Ricardo Castro Beeche, Francisco Jiménez Ortiz (shareholder of the Nation Group), Fernando Lara Bustamante, and Sergio Carballo who urged him to roll back the Social Guarantees and abolish the Labor Code and the Costa Rican Social Security Fund. In return, they offered him the presidency of the country and promised to place the Great Capital and the press at his service. Figueres declined indignantly and reported it to President Ulate.

== Outcome ==
Social Guarantees had an important impact on Costa Rican social and economic development. Universal healthcare has allowed the country to have one of the highest health rates (it is currently considered an important destination for medical tourism and has among the lowest level of infant mortality in Latin America only below Cuba), compulsory public education up to high school has allowed it to have a literacy level of 98% (one of the highest in Latin America) while the creation of the ICE has provided the country with accessibility in telecommunications and electrification of 90% of the territory.

Another important aspect is the Labor Code, which provides Costa Rican wage earners with a series of rights that are even higher than those of some developed countries (such as the United States) and according to some studies may have contributed to the creation of a strong middle class. In any case in Costa Rica there was never the semifeudalization that occurred in the rest of Central America, and since its identity began to develop, the differences between social classes were never very marked.

== See also ==
- Reform State
