= Francisco Aguilar Barquero =

President of Costa Rica from 1919 to 1920

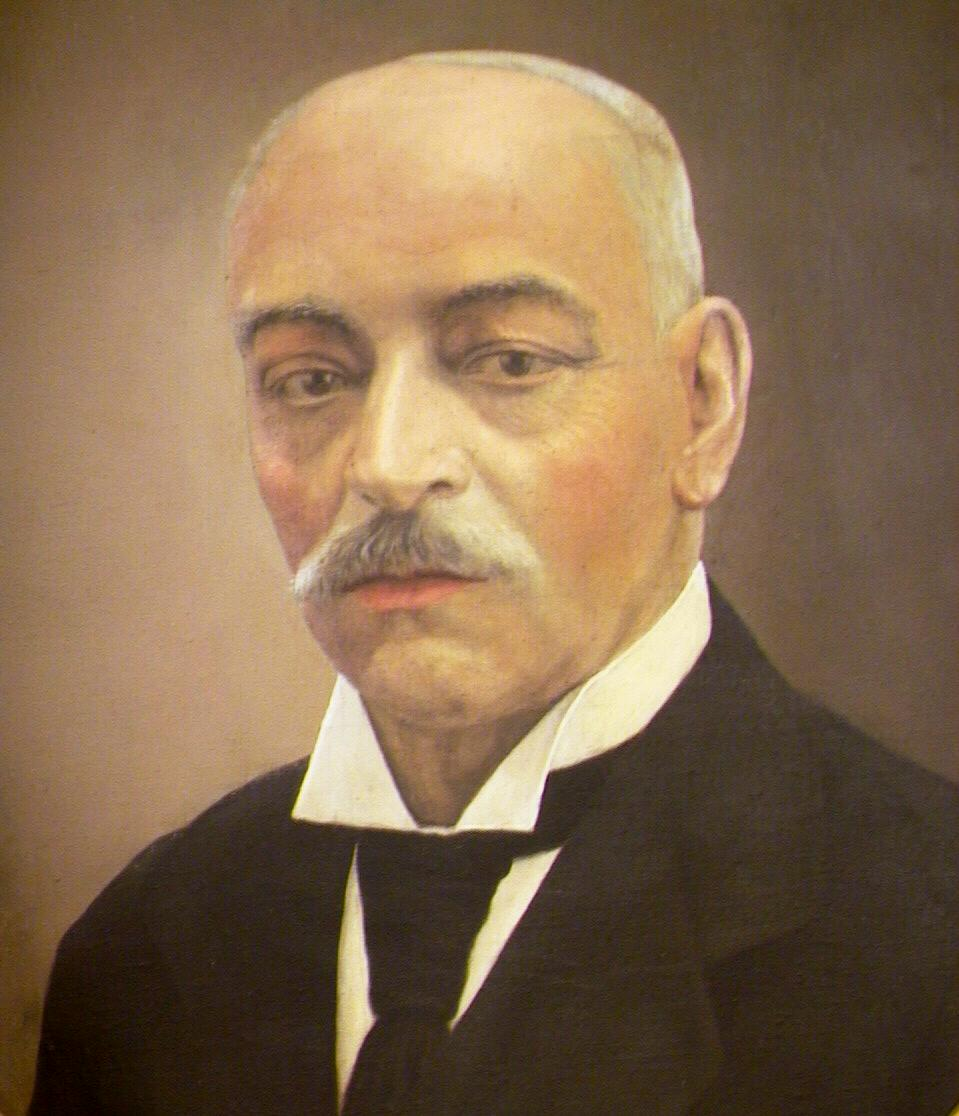

23rd President of Costa Rica
- In office 2 September 1919 – 8 May 1920
- Preceded by: Juan Bautista Quirós Segura
- Succeeded by: Julio Acosta García

Third Designate to the Presidency
- In office 8 May 1914 – 27 January 1917
- President: Alfredo González Flores
- Preceded by: Ezequiel Gutiérrez Iglesias
- Succeeded by: Ezequiel Gutiérrez Iglesias

Deputy of the Constitutional Congress
- In office 1 May 1912 – 30 April 1916
- Constituency: San José Province
- In office 1 May 1890 – 31 August 1892
- Constituency: Cartago Province
- In office 1 May 1888 – 12 August 1889
- Constituency: Limón Province

Secretary of War and Navy
- In office 12 August 1889 – 16 September 1889
- President: Bernardo Soto Alfaro
- Preceded by: Santiago de la Guardia
- Succeeded by: Ronulfo Soto Alfaro

Governor of Cartago
- In office 15 November 1886 – March 1887
- President: Bernardo Soto Alfaro
- Preceded by: José María Alfaro
- Succeeded by: Francisco José Oreamuno

Personal details
- Born: Francisco Ramón de Jesús Aguilar Barquero; 21 May 1857 Cartago, Costa Rica
- Died: 11 October 1924 (aged 67) San José, Costa Rica
- Party: Republican
- Other political affiliations: Constitutional Democratic (1889–1890)
- Spouse: Natalia Morúa Ortiz (m. 1880)
- Children: 8

Francisco Ramón de Jesús Aguilar Barquero (21 May 1857 – 11 October 1924) was a Costa Rican lawyer and politician who served as the 23rd President of Costa Rica from 1919 to 1920. A member of the Republican Party, his administration is noted for overseeing the country’s transition back to constitutional governance following the dictatorship of the Tinoco brothers.

== Early life and education ==
Francisco Ramón de Jesús Aguilar Barquero was born in Cartago on 21 May 1857, the son of Francisco Aguilar Cubero and María Sacramento Barquero. On 20 September 1880, he married Natalia Morúa Ortiz in Cartago. She was the daughter of Rafael Morúa y Quirós and María Josefa Clara Ortiz y Campos. The couple had eight children: Jorge Arturo, Manuel, Sara, Arturo, José Luis, Rubén, Marco Tulio, and Jorge Aguilar Morúa.

He initially worked as a schoolteacher before studying law. He graduated as a lawyer from the University of Santo Tomás in August 1881, at the age of 24. Aguilar subsequently served as a criminal judge, a professor at the Law School, an alternate magistrate of the Supreme Court of Justice, and president of the Costa Rican Bar Association.

== Early political career ==
On 15 November 1886, Aguilar was appointed governor of Cartago Province by President Bernardo Soto, serving until his resignation, which was accepted in March 1887. He was first elected to the Constitutional Congress as a representative for Limón for the 1888–1892 term and was subsequently elected Secretary of Congress, a position he held until his appointment as Secretary of War and Navy in August 1889. He resigned from that post a month later, in September 1889.

Aguilar later returned to active politics and was elected in 1889 as a deputy for both Limón and Cartago for the 1890–1894 term, representing the Constitutional Democratic Party. He chose to take his seat for Cartago and served until the dissolution of Congress by President José Joaquín Rodríguez in 1892, whom Aguilar had initially supported. He then summarized the practice of law until his return to public office, when he was elected as a deputy for San José for the 1912–1916 term, representing the Republican Party.

Political offices
Preceded by Juan Bautista Quirós Segura	President of Costa Rica; 1919–1920	Succeeded by Julio Acosta García
