= 1917 Costa Rican coup d'état =

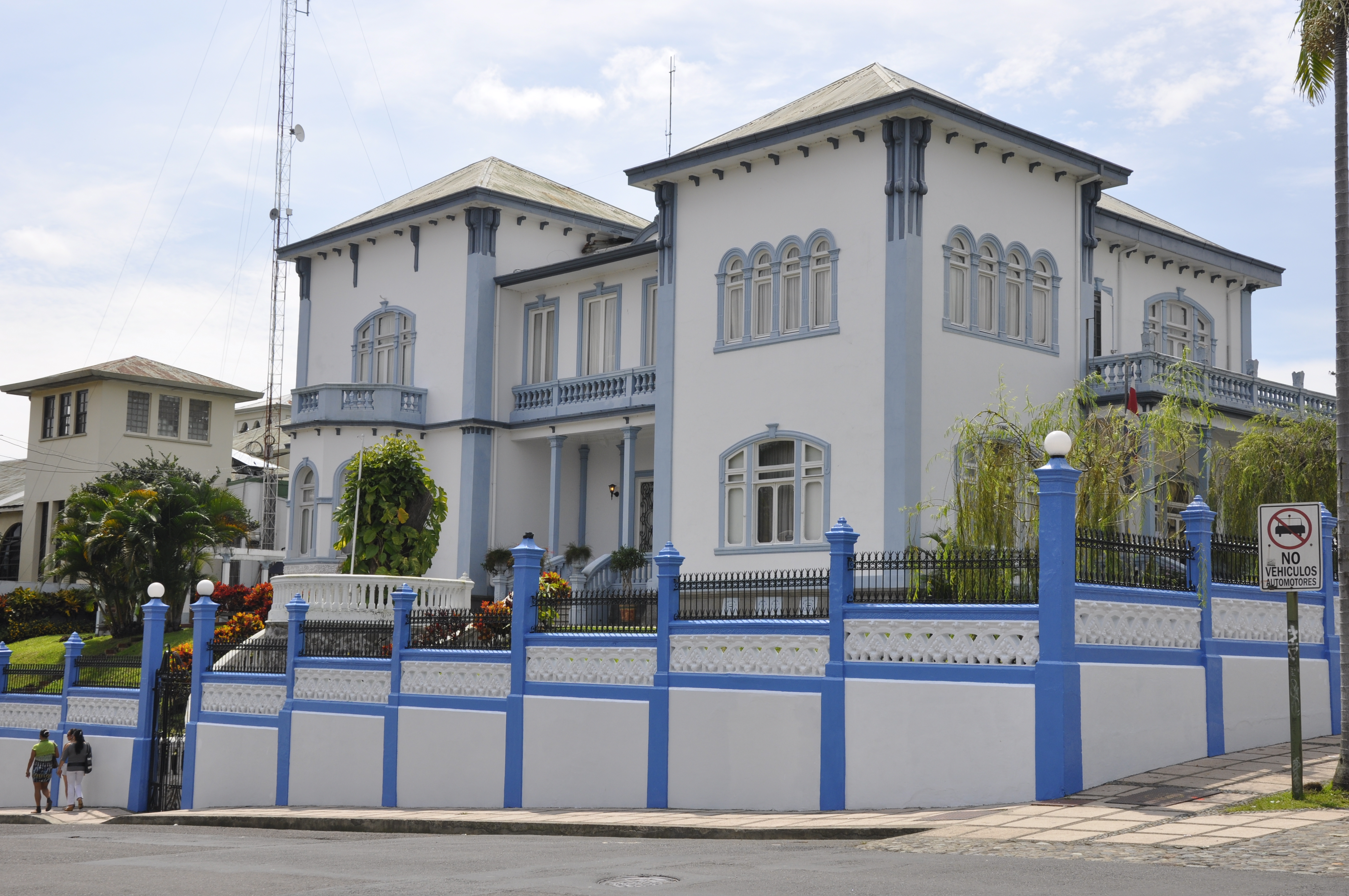
The Blue Castle, then seat of the government.

The 1917 Costa Rican coup d'état of 27 January 1917 was a rupture of the constitutional order in the Republic of Costa Rica, where the constitutional President Alfredo González Flores, was overthrown by his Minister of War and Navy Federico "Pelico" Tinoco and his brother and army commander José Joaquín Tinoco. The coup had the support of the Costa Rican oligarchy —mainly the bankers and coffee growers— affected by González's tax reform, particularly a greater tax burden for the big capital. Gonzalez did not enjoy popular support as he had been appointed by Congress and not elected in open elections.

Tinoco, in addition to the support of the most conservative oligarchy, had the support of the Catholic Church, of the Army (commanded by his brother), of important political and intellectual figures and of wide sectors of the population, although the repressive brutality of the regime was slowly undermining his popularity. The US government under President Woodrow Wilson did not recognize Tinoco as part of its policy of rejecting coups in Central America in order to promote stability.

The regime called a questionable presidential election with Tinoco as the only candidate and where the opposition could only limit itself to calling for abstention, as well as calling for elections for a Constituent Assembly that were almost entirely won by candidates of the Peliquista Party, the ruling party of Tinoco (nicknamed Pelico).

However, the dictatorship of Tinoco would last only two years. His brother José Joaquín was assassinated on August 10, 1919 and rebel forces had already entered the country with varying degrees of success. Tinoco alongside his immediate family left the country two days after the death of his brother. The following elections of 1919 were won by the leader of the anti-Tinoco opposition Julio Acosta García on a landslide victory. This was the only dictatorship in Costa Rica's history during the 20th Century, although a short-lived de facto Junta ruled the country for 18 months after the Costa Rican Civil War of 1948.
