= Julio Acosta García =

President of Costa Rica from 1920 to 1924

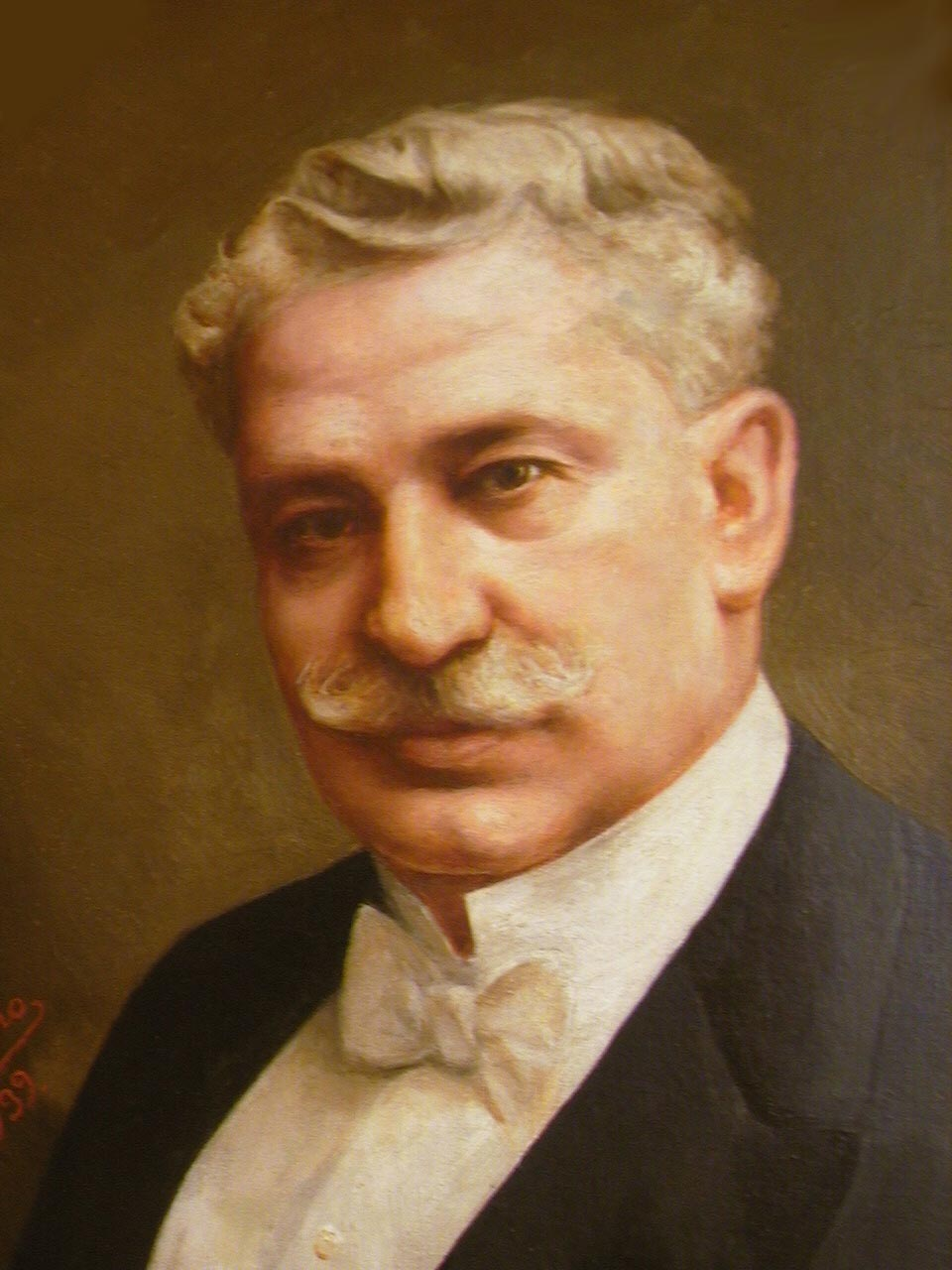
- Portrait by Tomás Povedano, 1939

24th President of Costa Rica
- In office 8 May 1920 – 8 May 1924
- Preceded by: Francisco Aguilar Barquero
- Succeeded by: Ricardo Jiménez Oreamuno

Secretary of Foreign Affairs
- In office 8 May 1944 – 20 April 1948
- President: Teodoro Picado Michalski
- Preceded by: Alberto Echandi Montero
- Succeeded by: José Figueres Ferrer
- In office 1 July 1915 – 27 January 1917
- President: Alfredo González Flores
- Preceded by: Manuel Castro Quesada
- Succeeded by: Carlos Lara Iraeta

Manager of the Costa Rican Social Security Fund
- In office 22 January 1942 – 8 May 1944
- President: Rafael Ángel Calderón Guardia
- Preceded by: Position established
- Succeeded by: Octavio Béeche Argüello

Director of the National Electricity Service
- In office 27 August 1941 – 22 January 1942
- President: Rafael Ángel Calderón Guardia
- Preceded by: Position established
- Succeeded by: Horacio Castro Rodríguez

Second Designate to the Presidency
- In office 8 May 1932 – 8 May 1936
- President: Ricardo Jiménez Oreamuno
- Preceded by: Francisco Ross Ramírez
- Succeeded by: Jorge Hine Saborío

Deputy of the Constitutional Congress
- In office 1 May 1938 – 27 August 1941
- Constituency: San José Province
- In office 1 May 1932 – 30 April 1936
- Constituency: San José Province
- In office 1 May 1902 – 30 April 1906
- Constituency: Alajuela Province

Governor of Alajuela
- In office 8 May 1906 – 27 December 1906
- President: Cleto González Víquez
- Preceded by: Pedro Loría Yglesias
- Succeeded by: Rodolfo Ardón (acting)

Additional positions
- 1912-1915: Minister to El Salvador
- 1908-1912: Chargé d'affaires to El Salvador
- 1907-1908: Consul-General to El Salvador

Personal details
- Born: Rafael Julio del Rosario Acosta García; 23 May 1872 San Ramón, Costa Rica
- Died: 6 July 1954 (aged 82) San José, Costa Rica
- Party: National Republican Party (from 1931)
- Other political affiliations: Constitutional Party (1919–1924); Republican Party (1915–1917); National Union Party (1902–1906)
- Spouse: Elena Gallegos Rosales (m. 1910)
- Children: 1
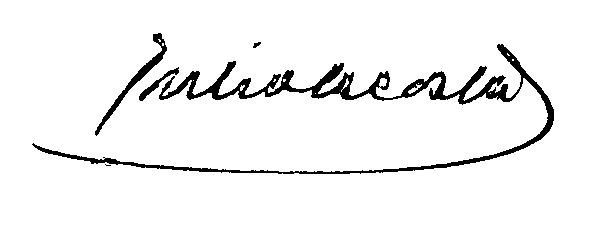
- Signature

Rafael Julio del Rosario Acosta García (23 May 1872 – 6 July 1954) was a Costa Rican diplomat and politician who served as the 24th President of Costa Rica from 1920 to 1924.

== Early life ==
Rafael Julio del Rosario Acosta García was born on 23 May 1872 in San Ramón, Alajuela, Costa Rica to Jesús de la Rosa García Zumbado and Juan Vicente Acosta Chaves. His family was of Spanish heritage, and he had eight brothers: Aquiles, Máximo, Emilio, Raúl, Ulises, Luis, Ricardo and Horacio. By the time Acosta was born, his family had relocated from San José to San Ramón, where his father and three of his uncles operated the Three Brothers Mine (Spanish: Mina Tres Hermanos) and operated a farm. His mother, known as Jesusita, was from a family of clergymen.

Acosta began his education in San José and started his secondary education at the University Institute of San José, a preparatory school run by Juan Fernández Ferraz. He completed his secondary schooling at the Colegio de San Luis Gonzaga in Cartago. He was fascinated by politics from a young age and became involved in several youth political movements in his twenties in which several radicals were arrested. Returning to Alajuela, he took a job at a banana plantation and served on the school board, before entering politics.

== Early career ==
Between 1902 and 1906 Acosta served as an elected deputy for the Alajuela Province to the Constitutional Congress with the National Union Party list. In May 1906, president Cleto González Víquez appointed him as provincial governor. He resigned in late December following a clash with the local Army commander.

In 1907, Acosta was sent to El Salvador to serve as Consul-General. In April 1910, he married María Natalia Elena Gallegos Rosales in San Salvador and within two years had been appointed as the Resident Minister in El Salvador. In mid-1915, he was recalled to Costa Rica and appointed to serve in the office of Secretary of State for the Office of Foreign Relations, Justice, Grace, and Worship.

One of the issues which concerned Acosta was a border dispute with Panama, which had long been pending. The dispute had arisen in 1910, when after Panama was separated from Gran Colombia the boundary with Costa Rica required clarification. The two parties entered into an agreement that arbiters would decide the boundary. On the Atlantic Coast, the French arbiter had given territory from Costa Rica to Panama and both sides accepted the ruling. On the Pacific Coast, the arbiter required Panama to cede territory to Costa Rica. Panama protested the ruling and the Chief Justice of the Supreme Court of the United States Edward Douglass White issued the "White Ruling" in 1914, which reaffirmed the territory on the Pacific was to be ceded to Costa Rica. Still unresolved, Acosta proposed in 1916 that the United States occupy the disputed territory to allow engineers from each country to survey the boundary and develop a resolution. During his tenure as foreign minister, Acosta traveled frequently. He was the first Minister to make official visits to all the countries of Central America.

On 27 January 1917, Acosta lost his post as minister when the brothers Federico Tinoco and Joaquín Tinoco led a coup d'état to overthrow the government. He and his family fled to his wife's parents farm, La Esperanza, where Acosta worked as a farm manager. He also soon found work in the editorial office of the Diario del Salvador newspaper, writing about the unrest in Costa Rica. After Tinoco was forced to resign in 1919 and the temporary president Juan Bautista Quirós Segura ceded power to interim president Francisco Aguilar Barquero, Acosta was invited to return to Costa Rica. He became a candidate for president on 8 September 1919, when the Constitutional Party selected him as their representative. Elected with 89% of the vote on 7 December, he took office officially on 8 May 1920 as the 24th President of Costa Rica.

== Presidency (1920–1924) ==
Acosta was a progressive president and set about almost immediately to roll back the repressive anticlerical and dictatorial policies of Tinoco, making promises to reform electoral processes, reform border disputes and operate a government without the corruption or squandering the public trust. He favored giving women the vote, established a pension program for veterans, proposed renegotiation of debts to stabilize the currency, and normalized the relationship of the state with Pope Benedict XV. During his administration, the Costa Rican Academy of Language, the Central Bank of Costa Rica, and an international cablegram service were established. Legislation was also introduced to protect minors, regulate gaming, reform insurance, create the Police Corps, establish pedagogical training, develop school inspection and teacher pension programs, and establish free and compulsory education for all children aged 8 to 15. Creating the Public Health Board, Acosta's administration also expanded the Medical Board to include regulations for homeopathy and osteopathy, as well as public assistance for the medical needs of the poor.

Acosta requested membership in the League of Nations to improve the country's international diplomacy, which was granted on 20 January 1921. Regionally, he proposed a pact that would create the Federal Republic of Central America. Because of on-going disputes with Nicaragua and Panama, the members of the proposed union were to be Costa Rica, El Salvador, Guatemala and Honduras. Though the legislatures of the other three countries approved a federation, the Costa Rican congress rejected the proposal.

In February 1921 the border dispute with Panama reemerged, when rumors of Panamanian expansion into the disputed territory caused Acosta to send an expeditionary force to evaluate what was going on. Panama's response to the entrance of troops into the disputed territory resulted in their request for protection from the United States. The celebrations for the centennial of Panama's liberation from Spain sparked nationalist feeling in Panama, and, fueled by the press, the border dispute quickly moved from a diplomatic conflict to a military one. The War of the Coto lasted from 21 February to 5 March 1921, with Costa Rica invading Panamanian territory in the Almirante and Bocas del Toro Districts and Panama's forces invading the Puntarenas Province of Costa Rica. The United States sent warships enroute and the League of Nations urged peaceful solutions. Diplomatic discussion followed, but delays on the Panamanian side forced the American arbiter to demand a withdrawal of Panama from the Coto Region on 23 August, ending the matter.

== Later career ==
Acosta's last message to Congress was made on 1 May 1924. He and his family moved to Paris for three years where he worked for the International Committee of the Red Cross. Returning to Costa Rica in 1927, he continued to work with the Red Cross until 1929, when he was appointed as a member to the Mortgage Credit Board.

In 1932, he was elected as a deputy for San José to the Constitutional Congress, serving from 1932 to 1936. Appointed to the Board of the National Bank of Costa Rica, he served until 1938, when he was again elected as a deputy for Congress. He resigned in order to accept appointment as Director of the National Electricity Service, which he assumed in August 1941. Acosta later became the manager of the Social Security Fund, being sworn in on 22 January 1942. The following February, he assumed the presidency of the National Civil Defense Board. In 1944, he was reappointed to the post of Foreign Minister for the Office of the Secretary of State. During that time, he served as Costa Rica's signatory in the 1945 convention in San Francisco for the signing of the United Nations Charter.

In May 1947, Acosta suffered a stroke and had to withdraw from his office.

== Death and legacy ==
Acosta died on 6 July 1954 in San José and was buried in the General Cemetery after an official funeral. In addition to the numerous honors he received during his life, there are several schools named in his honor in Costa Rica. A monument was erected in his memory in Parque Morazán in San José.

Political offices
| Preceded by Francisco Aguilar Barquero | President of Costa Rica; 1920–1924 | Succeeded by Ricardo Jiménez Oreamuno |
