= Federico Tinoco Granados =

President of Costa Rica from 1917 to 1919

General Federico Tinoco Granados
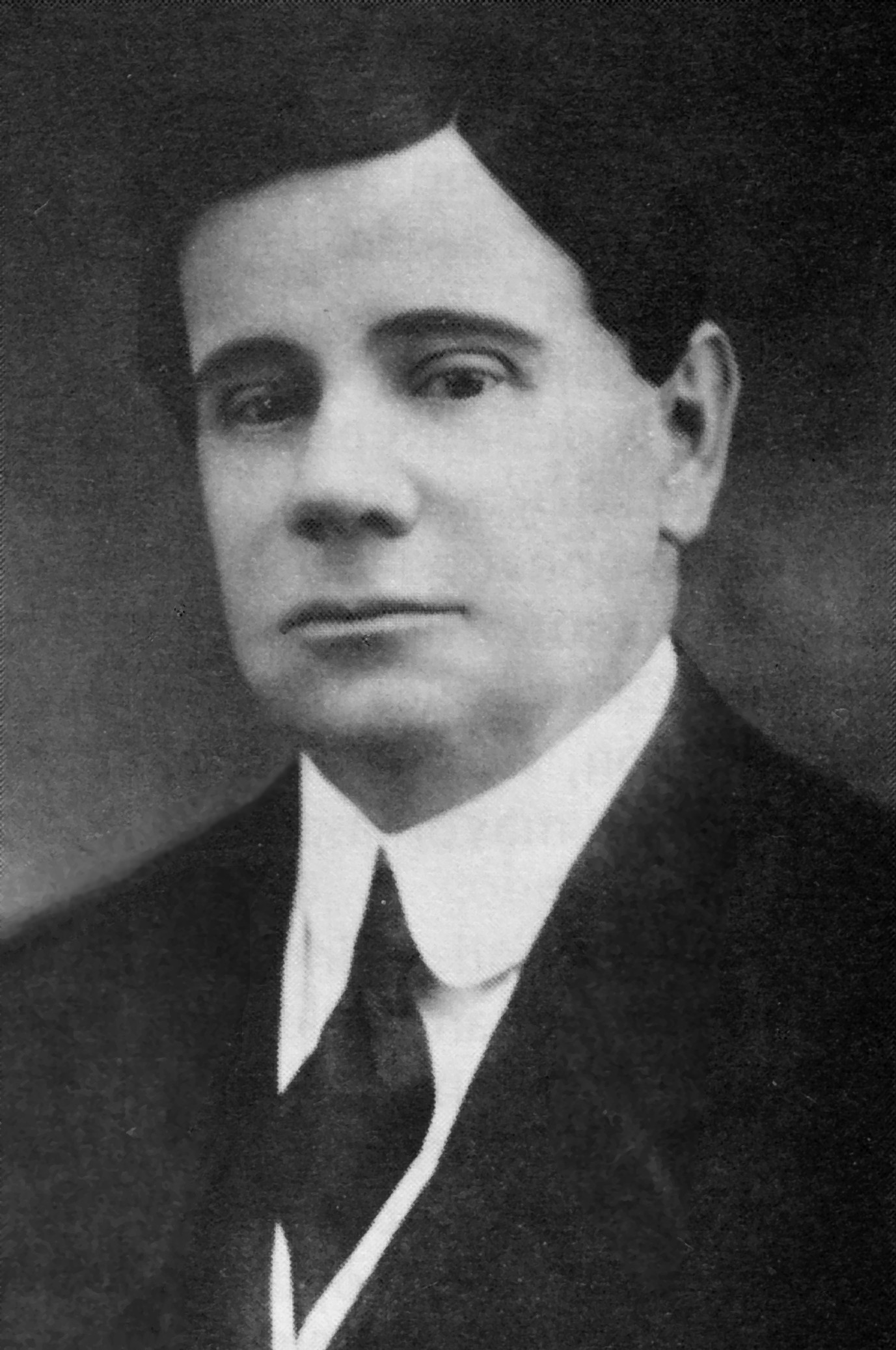

21st President of Costa Rica
- In office 27 January 1917 – 12 August 1919
- Preceded by: Alfredo González Flores
- Succeeded by: Juan Bautista Quirós

Minister of War and Navy
- In office 8 May 1914 – 27 January 1917
- President: Alfredo González Flores
- Succeeded by: Joaquín Tinoco Granados

Deputy of the Constitutional Congress
- In office 1 May 1908 – 30 April 1912
- Constituency: San José Province

Personal details
- Born: José Federico Alberto de Jesús Tinoco Granados; 21 November 1868 San José, Costa Rica
- Died: 7 September 1931 (aged 62) Paris, France
- Party: Peliquista Party (1917–1919)
- Other political affiliations: Republican Party (Before 1917)
- Spouse: María Fernández de Tinoco (m. 1898)
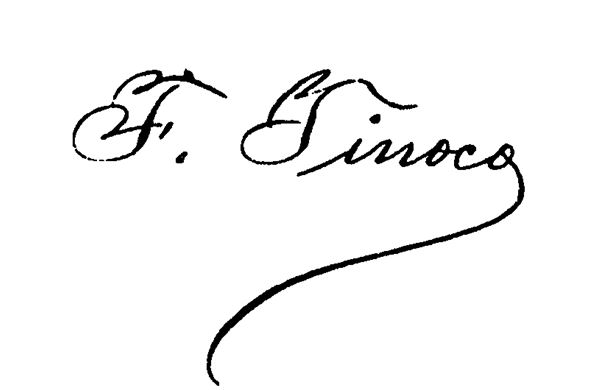
- Signature

José Federico Alberto de Jesús Tinoco Granados (21 November 1868 – 7 September 1931) was a Costa Rican military officer and politician who served as the 21st President of Costa Rica from 1917 to 1919. He seized power in a coup d'état that overthrew the constitutionally appointed president, Alfredo González Flores, under whom Tinoco had served as Minister of War and Navy. Following the coup, he established a one-party regime and ruled as a dictator. His government lasted until 1919 and marked the last military dictatorship in Costa Rican history.

== Biography ==
Tinoco was born on 21 November 1868 in San José, Costa Rica. On 5 June 1898, he married María de las Mercedes Elodia Fernández Le Cappellain in San José; the couple never had children.

After a career in the army, he was appointed Minister of War in the cabinet of President Alfredo González. On 27 January 1917, he and his brother José Joaquín seized power in a coup d'état. Initially, the Tincoco regime had widespread support in Costa Rica, but it eventually developed into a repressive military dictatorship that attempted to crush all opposition. The United States, under President Woodrow Wilson, refused to give diplomatic recognition to the Tincoco regime, even though Tincoco declared war on the German Empire in May 1918 in the midst of World War I. Tincoco was unable to obtain US financial support, leading the government to print more money, which led to inflation and financial chaos.

Popular sentiment against Tinoco, which had already begun on 13 June 1919, quickly came to a head, and his brother was assassinated by early August. On 13 August 1919, Tinoco voluntarily resigned in favor of Juan Bautista Quirós, and went into exile in Europe, where he died in Paris on 7 September 1931.

Due to a dispute over the legitimacy of the Tinoco government, Costa Rica was not a party to the Treaty of Versailles and thus never unilaterally ended the state of war between itself and Germany. The technical state of war only ended after World War II, when Costa Rica was included in the Potsdam Agreement; Costa Rica did, however, issue another formal declaration of war against Germany on 11 December 1941, despite technically already being at war since 1918.

Political offices
Preceded by Alfredo González Flores	President of Costa Rica; 1917-1919	Succeeded by Juan Bautista Quirós Segura
