= Juan Carlos Mendoza García =

Costa Rican political scientist and politician (born 1975)

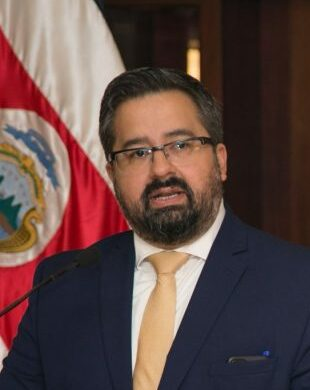
- Mendoza in 2018

Minister of Communication
- In office 8 May 2018 – 8 January 2019
- President: Carlos Alvarado Quesada
- Preceded by: Mauricio Herrera Ulloa
- Succeeded by: Nancy Marín Espinoza

Permanent Representative to the United Nations
- In office 8 May 2014 – 8 May 2018
- President: Luis Guillermo Solís
- Preceded by: Eduardo Ulibarri
- Succeeded by: Rodrigo Alberto Carazo Zeledón

49th President of the Legislative Assembly of Costa Rica
- In office 1 May 2011 – 30 April 2012
- Preceded by: Luis Gerardo Villanueva Monge
- Succeeded by: Victor Emilio Granados Calvo

Deputy of the Legislative Assembly of Costa Rica
- In office 1 May 2010 – 30 April 2014
- Preceded by: Alberto Salom Echeverría
- Succeeded by: Maureen Clarke Clarke
- Constituency: San José (9th Office)

Personal details
- Born: 7 July 1975 (age 51) San José, Costa Rica
- Party: PAC
- Education: University of Costa Rica (BA)

Juan Carlos Mendoza García (born 7 July 1975) is a Costa Rican political scientist and politician who served as Ambassador to the United Nations from 2014 to 2018. He was a deputy with the Citizens' Action Party (PAC for its Spanish initials) during the 2010 to 2014 and served as President of the Legislative Assembly from 2011 to 2012.

== Early life and academics ==
Mendoza is the son of Rolando Mendoza Hernández, a biologist and conservationist, and Nelly García Murillo, a professor of literature. Mendoza studied political science at the University of Costa Rica. As a student, he was disillusioned with the Social Christian Unity Party (PUSC for its Spanish initials) and the National Liberation Party (PLN for its Spanish initials), the two ruling parties of Costa Rica. As such, he became involved with Gente U, a leftist student group. In 1996, he traveled to Switzerland to work on an ecumenical council associated with the World Council of Churches. That same year, he traveled to Germany as a volunteer with the Hendrik Kraemer Haus, helping refugees. He earned a bachelor's degree in political science and a Master's in communication.

Mendoza has cited the works of the '40s generation as having an impact on his political and social development.

== Public service career ==
In 1999, Mendoza began working for the National Ombudsman's office. When PAC was formed in 2001, Mendoza joined and has been a member ever since. From 2002 to 2006, Mendoza worked as an adviser to deputy Rodrigo Alberto Carazo Zeledón. From 2006 to 2010, he worked as an adviser to deputy Leda Zamora. During both advisory stints, Mendoza specialized in public budgeting and the defense of national institutions that create public opportunities.

In February 2010, he was elected deputy. He served on the Economic Affairs, International Relations, Overseas Commerce, Human Rights, and Electric commissions. He was the leader of the PAC deputies during his first year in office, and in his second year he was elected president of the Legislative Assembly, winning with 31 votes from five different parties. Mendoza allied PAC with other parties to create the Alliance for Costa Rica (Alianza por Costa Rica), an opposition coalition.

In this role, Mendoza fought against President Laura Chinchilla's tax plan, attempts to raise the salaries of deputies, and attempts to deregulate the energy market to allow more private investments. Additionally, Mendoza cut spending by deputies, installed GPS in the Assembly's car to track unlawful use, supported water rights, and rights for indigenous people and the LGBT population.

In April 2014, President-elect Luis Guillermo Solís announced Mendoza as the next Costa Rican Ambassador to the United Nations.

== 2014 presidential primary and campaign ==
Mendoza was the first PAC candidate to enroll in the party's presidential primary in 2013. Running against Luis Guillermo Solís, Epsy Campbell Barr, and Ronald Solís Bolaños, Mendoza gained only 113 fewer votes than Solís. The primary campaign was hotly contested but not bitter. Solís considered Mendoza as a vice presidential candidate before settling on Ana Helena Chacón and Helio Fallas. Mendoza claimed that the primary process strengthened PAC and began campaigning vigorously for

== See also ==
- Citizens' Action Party
- Legislative Assembly of Costa Rica
