= Luis Guillermo Solís =

President of Costa Rica from 2014 to 2018 (born 1958)

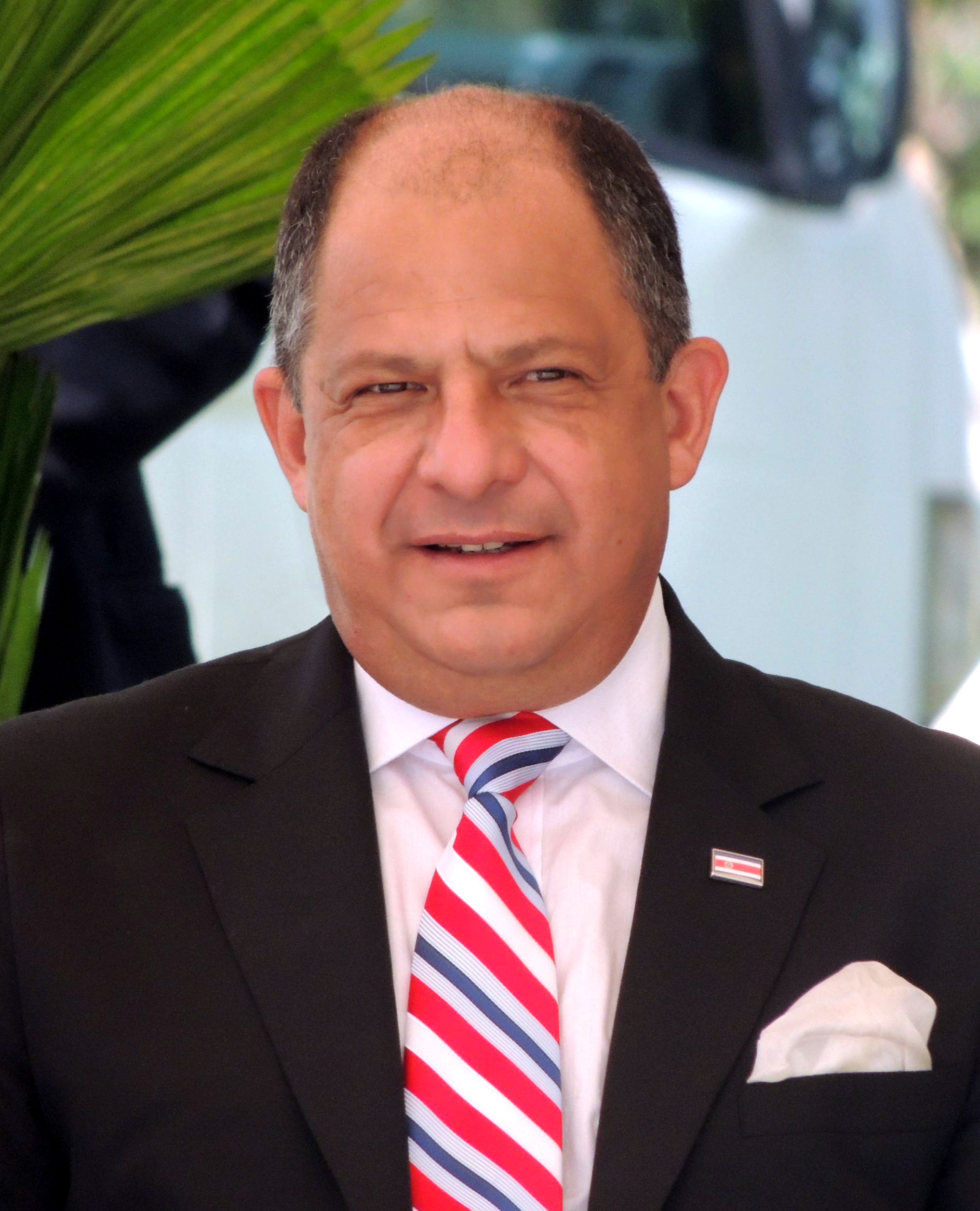
- Solís in 2014

47th President of Costa Rica
- In office 8 May 2014 – 8 May 2018
- Vice President: First Vice President Helio Fallas Venegas; Second Vice President Ana Helena Chacón
- Preceded by: Laura Chinchilla
- Succeeded by: Carlos Alvarado
Additional offices
President pro tempore of CELAC
In office 8 May 2014 – 28 January 2015
Preceded by	Laura Chinchilla
Succeeded by	Rafael Correa
Secretary-General of the National Liberation Party
In office May 2002 – July 2003
Preceded by	Rolando González Ulloa
Succeeded by	Carmen Valverde Acosta

Personal details
- Born: Luis Guillermo Solís Rivera; 25 April 1958 (age 68) San José, Costa Rica
- Party: National Liberation Party (Before 2005); Citizens' Action Party (2009–present)
- Spouse: Nancy Olive Worsfold Richards (m. 1987 div. 2006)
- Domestic partner: Mercedes Peñas Domingo (2006–present)
- Children: 6
- Education: University of Costa Rica (BA); Tulane University (MA)
- Occupation: Political scientist; historian; professor; politician; academic administrator; writer
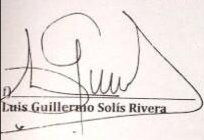
- Signature

Luis Guillermo Solís Rivera (Spanish pronunciation: [lwis ɣiˈʝeɾmo soˈlis riˈβeɾa]; born 25 April 1958) is a Costa Rican political scientist, historian and politician who served as the 47th President of Costa Rica from 2014 to 2018. A member of the Citizens' Action Party, he has had an academic career spanning more than three decades.

Solís led the first round of the 2014 presidential election and went on to win the presidency by a landslide, receiving the highest number of votes ever obtained by a presidential candidate in Costa Rican history. His election marked the first time that a member of the PAC assumed the presidency. At the time of his election, he was a full professor at the University of Costa Rica, where he had taught since 1981.

Since May 2017, Solis has been under fire after a report accused him of allegedly corruptly expediting the legal process of Chinese cement imports in favor of businessman and owner of Sinocem, Juan Carlos Bolaños, in a case known as Cementazo. In May 2018 the Public Prosecutor of Costa Rica dismissed the charges against him.

== Early life, education, and academic career ==
Solís was born in San José, Costa Rica, to Vivienne Rivera Allen, an educator, and Freddy Solís Avendaño, an uneducated shoemaker. Both his parents lived in Turrialba, and as such many residents consider him Turrialban. His maternal grandmother's family has Afro-Caribbean and Chinese roots, coming from Jamaica to Costa Rica in the early 1900s. Solís grew up in San Pedro de Montes de Oca and Curridabat, neighborhoods of San José. He attended Methodist High School in San José, where he was president of the student body, before studying history at the University of Costa Rica, where he earned a degree with academic honors in 1979. He earned a master's degree in Latin American Studies at Tulane University in New Orleans.

Solís has held various academic and consulting positions. Between 1981 and 1987, he was an associate professor at the University of Costa Rica. In addition, he was a Fulbright Scholar at the University of Michigan from 1983 to 1985. During this time, Solís worked with the Arias administration and eventually became director of the Center for Peace and Reconciliation (CPR for its Spanish initials). From 1992 to 1995, Solís worked with the Academic Council of the United Nations System. Starting in 1999, Solís worked for Florida International University as coordinator in the Center for the Administration of Justice and as a researcher for the Latin American and Caribbean Center, where he analyzed political and social events in Latin America.

A writer and editorial writer, Solís has published numerous essays and books about national and international affairs. In the 1990s, he wrote for La República, a daily newspaper based in San José. His writing has been published by Foreign Affairs Latinoamérica, Frontera Norte, Espacios and Global Governance. His writing has focused on civil society, international relations, and trade.

Solís is a member of the Inter-American Dialogue.

== Political beginnings ==
While still at UCR, Solís joined the National Liberation Party (PLN for its Spanish initials) in 1977. Solís was an adviser to Óscar Arias in the Foreign Ministry, working on the Esquipulas Peace Agreement for which Arias would later win a Nobel Peace Prize. Solís served as Director of International Relations for the PLN. During José María Figueres Olsen's time in office, Solís was ambassador of Central American Affairs.

In 2002, Solís followed Rolando González Ulloa as General Secretary of the PLN, a position he resigned from the following year, citing his disappointment with the Alcatel-Lucent bribery scandal that many PLN leaders were involved in. In 2005, he denounced the PLN for irregularities and corruption during party elections, along with a host of former PLN members. Solís went as far as to call the PLN leadership "Napoleonic" and "anti-democratic". He officially renounced his affiliation with the party and returned to academics.

After the 2006 election, Solís' name began to come up in PAC circles, particularly at meetings of the "ungroup," an informal gathering of PAC officials, led by former deputy and former Vice President of the National University of Costa Rica Alberto Salom Echeverría. Ottón Solís, one of PAC's founders and three-time presidential candidate, suggested that Luis Guillermo Solís run as a vice presidential candidate in 2010. Luis Guillermo Solis rejected the offer because he was working for the General Secretariat of Ibero-America (SEGIB for its Spanish initials), and employees of SEGIB were not allowed to participate in elections.

In 2009, Luis Guillermo Solís began his official affiliation with PAC. He began attending meetings of the "ungroup" in 2010. Within the party, PAC leader María Eugenia Venegas recognized Solís' potential and pushed for him to be elevated within the party. Solís undertook several trips around the country to meet with national and provincial PAC leaders.

== 2014 presidential campaign ==
Solís announced his candidacy for president on 27 November 2012. In the PAC's primary, he ran against Epsy Campbell Barr, Juan Carlos Mendoza García, and Ronald Solís Bolaños, winning with 35 percent of the vote, only 110 votes more than Juan Carlos Mendoza García.

In October 2013, he chose Helio Fallas and Ana Helena Chacón Echeverría as his Vice-Presidential running mates. Among his aims, Solís claimed he would clean up corruption, create major investments in infrastructure, and shore up Costa Rica's universal health care and social security system. He also promised to continue initiatives to keep Costa Rica environmentally friendly. He said that he would "put the brakes" on new free trade agreements and would begin correctly administrating current free trade agreements. As such, Solís received a tremendous amount of political support from the country's trade unions.

On 2 February 2014, Solís won the most votes in the election with 30.95 percent. PLN candidate Johnny Araya came second with 29.95 percent of the vote. Most of Solís' support came from the Central Valley provinces of San José, Alajuela, Heredia and Cartago.

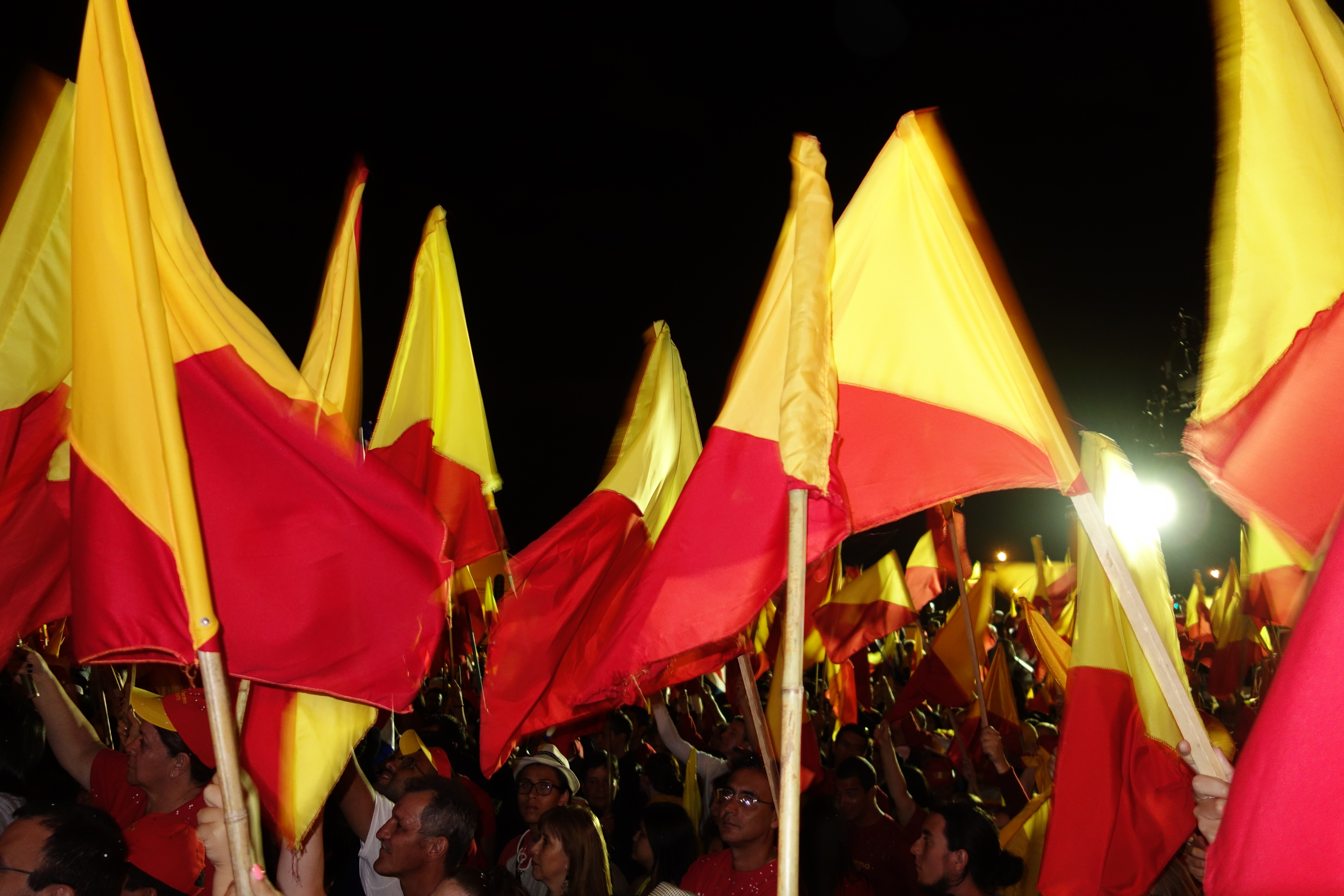
PAC supporters wave their traditional colors to celebrate Luis Guillermo Solís' victory on 6 April 2014

Because no candidate exceeded 40 percent of the vote, a runoff was scheduled for 6 April, as required by the constitution. However, on 5 March, Araya announced that he would abandon his campaign after polls showed him far behind Solís; one poll showed him losing by over 43 percent. However, under Costa Rican law the runoff still had to take place, and Solís won with over 77 percent of the vote, the largest margin ever recorded for a free election in Costa Rica. Unlike the first round, Solís earned a majority in every province, including Puntarenas, Limón, and Guanacaste. When he took office on 8 May, he was the first president in 66 years not to come from the PLN or what is now the PUSC.

Immediately after the election, Solís thanked Costa Rican voters. He received congratulatory notes from world leaders, including US Secretary of State John Kerry, Ecuadoran President Rafael Correa, Mexican President Enrique Peña Nieto, Venezuelan President Nicolás Maduro, Bolivian President Evo Morales, and the spokesperson from the French Ministry of International Affairs. For his part, Araya congratulated Solís on his victory, calling for national unity.

== Presidency (2014–2018) ==
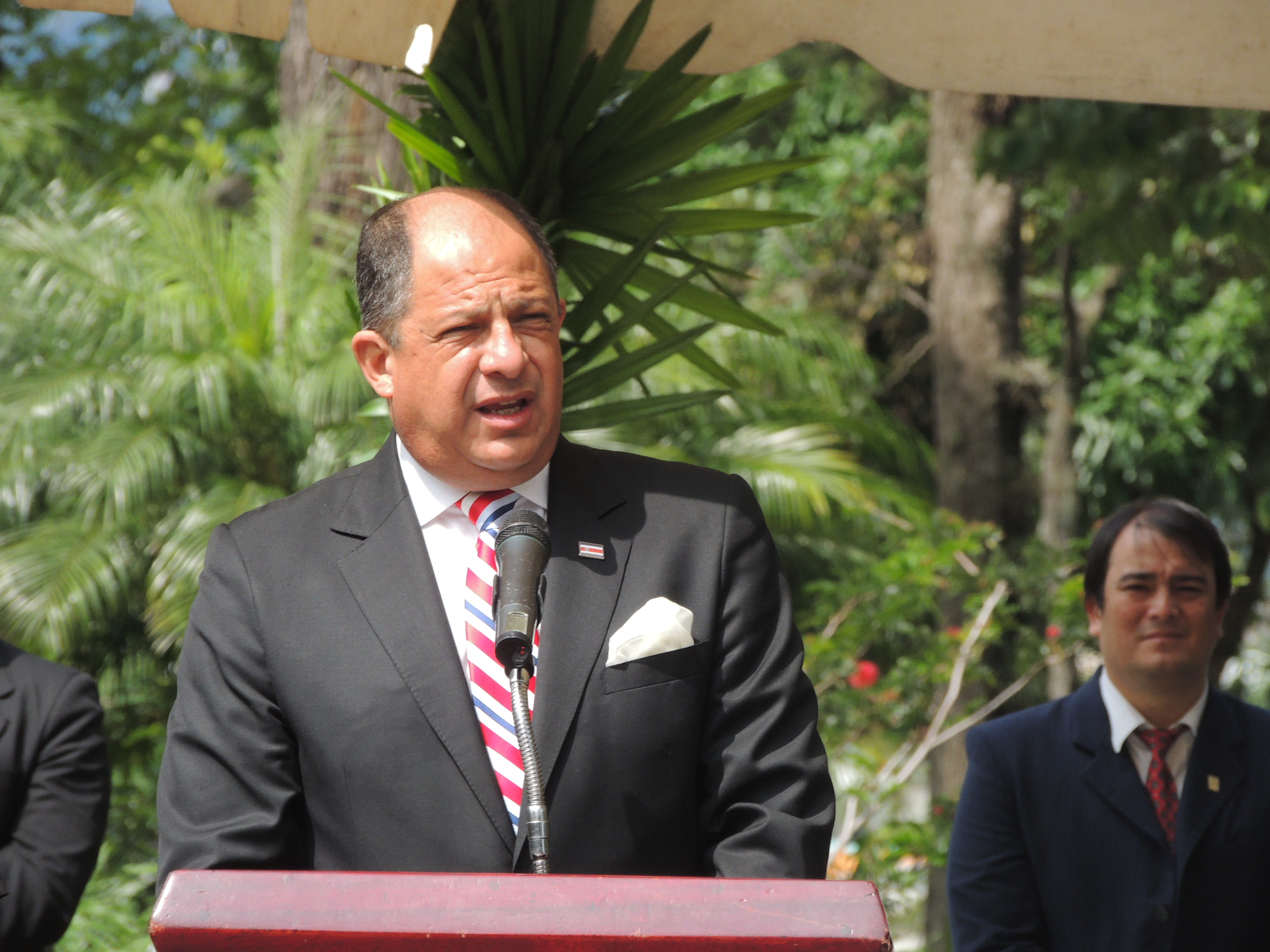
Solís speaking in 2014

A little over a week before taking office, in April 2014, Solís announced the creation of his cabinet. His cabinet consists of mostly PAC members or non-aligned citizens. However, two PUSC members were also added: María del Rocío Sáenz, Abel Pacheco's former health minister, heads the Costa Rican Social Security System (Caja Costarricense del Seguro Social). Delia Villalobos, another former health minister, heads the Social Protection Council (Consejo de Seguridad).

Solís took office on 8 May 2014, amid festive fanfare. Delegations from more than 80 countries attended his inauguration at La Sabana Metropolitan Park, including Prince Felipe de Borbón of Spain, Evo Morales of Bolivia, Rafael Correa of Ecuador, and the Secretary General of the Organization of American States, José Miguel Insulza. Solís said, in Costa Rican vernacular, that he is taking over a "weed farm" (finca encharralada), pointing out growing income inequality and poverty, as well as a national teachers' strike.

In 2017, Solís ate a wasp on camera while speaking. The incident went viral and became the subject of internet memes.

=== Economic issues ===
In 2014, President Solís presented a budget with an increase in spending of 19% for 2015, an increase of 0.5% for 2016 and an increase of 12% for 2017. When the 2017 budget was finally proposed, it totaled US$15.9 billion. Debt payments account for one-third of that amount. Of greater concern is the fact that a full 46% of the budget will require financing, a step that will increase the debt owed to foreign entities.

The country's credit rating was reduced by Moody's Investors Service in early 2017 to Ba2 from Ba1, with a negative outlook on the rating. The agency particularly cited the "rising government debt burden and persistently high fiscal deficit, which was 5.2% of GDP in 2016". Moody's was also concerned about the "lack of political consensus to implement measures to reduce the fiscal deficit [which] will result in further pressure on the government's debt ratios". In late July 2017, the Costa Rica Central Bank estimated the budget deficit at 6.1 percent of the country's GDP.

A 2017 study by the Organisation for Economic Co-operation and Development warned that reducing the foreign debt must be a very high priority for the government. Other fiscal reforms were also recommended to moderate the budget deficit.

==== Liquidity problems ====
In early August 2017, the President admitted that the country was facing a "liquidity crisis" and promised that a higher VAT tax and higher income tax rates were being considered by his government. Such steps are essential, Solís told the nation, because it was facing difficulties in paying its obligations and guaranteeing the provision of services." "Despite all the public calls and efforts we have made since the start of my administration to contain spending and increase revenues, there is still a gap that we must close with fresh resources," he said. The crisis was occurring in spite of growth, low inflation and continued moderate interest rates, Solís concluded.

He explained that the Treasury will prioritize payments on the public debt first, then salaries, pensions, and, finally, on infrastructure. The subsequent priorities include transfers to institutions "according to their social urgency." All other payments will be made only if funds are available.

== Political, economic, and social philosophy ==
The past generated two different economies: one very dynamic, modern and generally oriented toward international markets, with limited possibilities for new sources of employment, and the other, traditional, which created many jobs with low pay where small and medium-sized businesses concentrated.

— Luis Guillermo Solís, Plan Rescate, 2014-2018

Like most members of PAC, Solís identifies himself as a progressivist. His Plan Rescate, or Rescue Plan, outlines his political beliefs. This plan focused on three central issues: anti-corruption, economic growth, and reducing income inequality.

Solís claims that economic neoliberalism has created too much income inequality for Costa Rica. Past governments have avoided collecting taxes on large companies and high-income earners, leading to budget deficits which Solís claims his administration will fix through better enforcement. Banks should not encourage exports at the expense of income growth among the poor, according to Solís. He believes that economic liberalization has generally harmed women more than men because they have traditionally had less access to higher-income jobs. Part of that liberalization, he claims, included ignoring the financial and growth needs of the agricultural industry.

Solís supports environmental protections, which he believes Costa Rica has forgotten. As such, Solís believes that water must be safeguarded from private development and mismanagement, something that has caused water shortages in many of the country's municipalities. Solís claims that he will prosecute violators of the Water Resources Management Bill.

In addition, Solís supports increased LGBT rights for lesbians, gays, bisexuals, and transsexuals. In May 2014, he ordered that a rainbow flag be flown over the Presidential House as a show of solidarity with gays on International Day Against Homophobia and Transphobia.

Solís is a Catholic. As a presidential candidate, he visited the Basilica of Our Lady of Angels, home to the Costa Rican patron saint La Negrita, a traditional pilgrimage for many Costa Ricans and tourists. He supports the separation of church and state despite Catholicism being the country's official religion. With regard to ethical issues, he also supports civil unions, and in-vitro fertilization.

== Personal life ==
Solis has five children from his previous marriage to his first wife, Nancy Olive Worsfold Richards (1987–2006): Monica, Cristina, Beatriz, Diego, and Ignacio.

Solís is not married to Mercedes Peñas Domingo, but during his administration, she was altogether considered the First Lady of Costa Rica. He and Peñas, who began dating in 2006, have one daughter, Inés. Peñas said that she hoped to be active as an adviser to Solís, who called her "Jiminy Cricket." Peñas said that some of her duties as First Lady were machista and she would nevertheless greet dignitaries and perform other obligations. In addition to public service and academics, Solís enjoys farming.

As of July 2020, Solis has been named the Interim Director of the Kimberly Green Latin American and Caribbean Center at Florida International University. where he has been working as a professor since 2018.

== See also ==
- List of Afro-Latinos

Party political offices
Preceded by Ottón Solís	PAC nominee for President of Costa Rica; 2014	Succeeded by Carlos Alvarado Quesada
Political offices
Preceded by Laura Chinchilla	President of Costa Rica; 2014–2018	Succeeded by Carlos Alvarado Quesada
Diplomatic posts
Preceded by Laura Chinchilla	President pro tempore of CELAC; 2014–2015	Succeeded by Rafael Correa
