= 2013 Citizens' Action Party presidential primary =

Costa Rican primary election

Citizens' Action Party presidential primary, 2013
← 2009	July 21, 2013	2017 →
- Turnout: 23.247
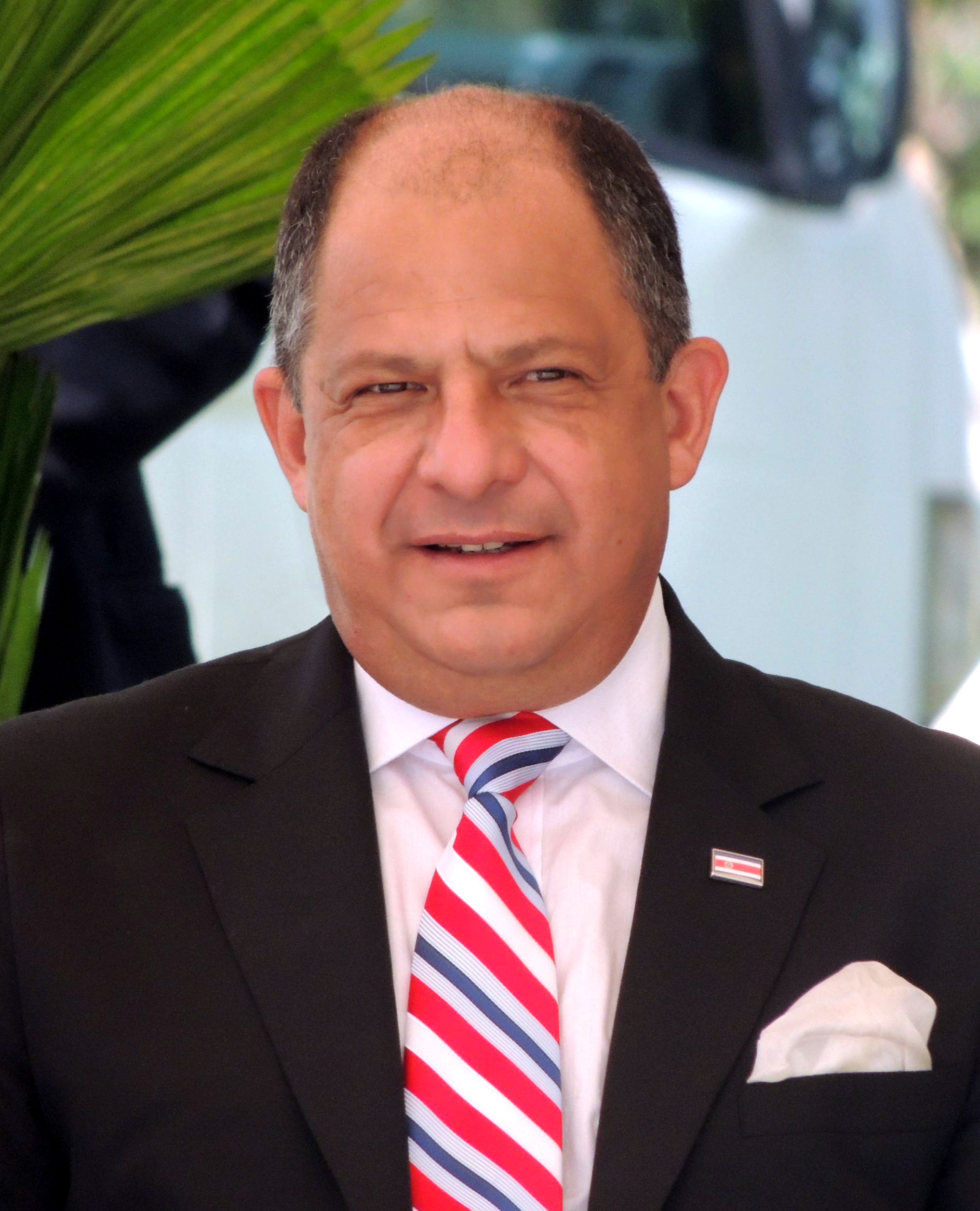

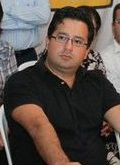

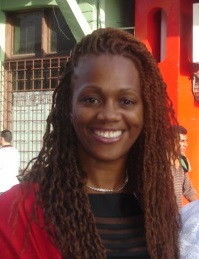
Nominee	Luis Guillermo Solís	Juan Carlos Mendoza	Epsy Campbell
Party	PAC	PAC	PAC
Popular vote	8.153	8.040	5.767
Percentage	35.48%	34.99%	25.10%
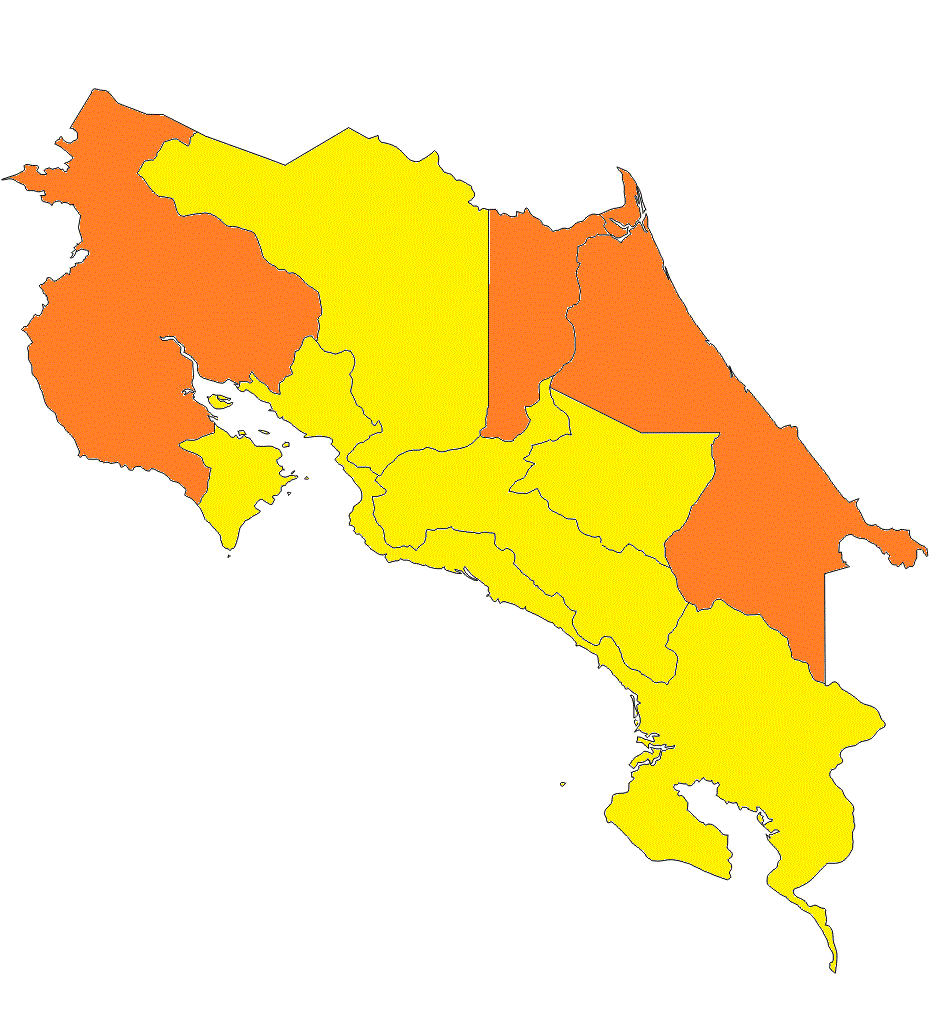
- Most voted candidate by province: Solís Mendoza
Previous Presidential Candidate
Ottón Solís
Presidential Candidate
Luis Guillermo Solís

PAC’s second presidential primary (known as Citizens' National Convention or Convención Nacional Ciudadana) was held on July 21, 2013 in order to elect the party’s presidential nominee for the 2014 Costa Rican general election. Unlike the previous election, this was an open primary and every citizen was able to vote as far as pledge written membership to the party before casting the vote.

Three-time candidate and party’s founder Ottón Solís declined run for president for the fourth time opening the opportunity for new leaderships and the presidential nomination in one of Costa Rica’s major parties. Four candidates were able to enroll their names; former deputy and vice presidential candidate Epsy Campbell, then deputy and former President of the Legislative Assembly Juan Carlos Mendoza, former deputy Ronald Solís and college professor Luis Guillermo Solís. None of the Solis were related. Other aspirants were businesswoman and former vice presidential nominee Monica Segnini, lawmaker Claudio Monge and former candidate in the previous primary and future ambassador in Washington Román Macaya, but all dropped their candidacies for different reasons.

Contrary to all expectations Luis Guillermos Solís won the election with 35% of the votes, only 113 votes more than Mendoza. Campbell, who was by far the frontrunner in all previous polls, achieved only 25% of the vote, and Solís Bolaños received 4%. Solís was declared PAC’s presidential candidate and would eventually won the 2014 presidential race in both rounds.

== See also ==
- 2014 Costa Rican general election
- Social Christian Unity Party presidential primary, 2013
