= Jorge Salas =

Jorge Salas may refer to:

- Jorge Alberto Salas (1914–1992), Argentine sailor
- Jorge Salas (biathlete) (born 1942), Argentine biathlete
- Jorge Antonio Salas Bonilla (born 1953), Costa Rican politician
- Jorge Salas (footballer) (born 1972), Mexican footballer
