= Citizens' Action Party (Costa Rica) =

Costa Rican political party

Citizens' Action Party Partido Acción Ciudadana
- Abbreviation: PAC
- President: Fabián Solano Fernández
- Secretary-General: Pablo Díaz Chaves
- Spokesperson: Claudia Dobles Camargo
- Founder: Ottón Solís
- Founded: 3 December 2000; 25 years ago
- Split from: PLN
- Ideology: Social democracy Progressivism; Social liberalism Anti-corruption; Factions: Figuerism; Social conservatism
- Political position: Centre-left
- International affiliation: Progressive Alliance
- Colors: Gold; Red
- Legislative Assembly: 1 / 57
- Mayors: 0 / 84
- Alderpeople: 2 / 518
- Syndics: 0 / 491
- District councillors: 0 / 1,952
- Intendants: 0 / 8

Party flag

Website
- accionciudadana.cr

The Citizens' Action Party (Spanish: Partido Acción Ciudadana, PAC) is a Costa Rican political party that identifies primarily with social democracy, progressivism, and political reform. Founded in 2000, the party emerged as an alternative to the country's traditional two-party system, placing particular emphasis on transparency, citizen participation, and the fight against corruption. It governed from 2014 to 2022 under presidents Luis Guillermo Solís and Carlos Alvarado Quesada.

The party's platform is centered on promoting citizen involvement in public affairs, strengthening democratic institutions, and ensuring accountability in government. Opposition to corruption has been one of its defining principles, with the party arguing that corruption contributes to underdevelopment, weakens public finances, and discourages political participation.

The PAC played a prominent role in the campaign opposing Costa Rica's accession to the Dominican Republic–Central America Free Trade Agreement, becoming one of the leading political voices against the treaty during the national debate of the 2000s. Over time, the party expanded its platform to include environmental protection, same-sex marriage, human rights, and public-sector modernization.

== History and elections ==
=== Founding and 2002 election ===
The Citizens' Action Party (PAC) was founded on 3 December 2000 by dissidents from Costa Rica's two traditional political parties, the National Liberation Party (PLN) and the Social Christian Unity Party (PUSC). Its principal founders included economist Ottón Solís Fallas, Margarita Penón Góngora, and Alberto Cañas Escalante, all former PLN members who argued that the party had abandoned its social democratic ideological principles and ethical standards. Under Solís's leadership, the PAC sought to channel growing public dissatisfaction with the traditional two-party system.

Initially focused on combating corruption and promoting political reform, the party made a significant breakthrough in the 2002 general election. Its presidential candidate, Solís, won approximately 26.2% of the vote, one of the strongest performances by a third-party candidate in modern Costa Rican history. Although he did not advance to the second round, his candidacy contributed to the fragmentation of the traditional party system and marked the beginning of a new era of multiparty competition in Costa Rican politics.

In the legislative election, the PAC won 21.9% of the popular vote and secured 14 of the 57 seats in the Legislative Assembly, becoming the third-largest political force in the legislature. However, internal disagreements soon emerged, and six of the party's fourteen deputies left the PAC within months of taking office, reducing its caucus to eight members. Despite these defections, the party remained a significant opposition force and consolidated its position as an alternative to the country's traditional parties.

=== 2006 election ===
In the 2006 general election, the PAC further consolidated its position as one of Costa Rica's principal political forces. Its presidential candidate, Ottón Solís Fallas, ran for a second time and narrowly lost to Óscar Arias Sánchez of the National Liberation Party. Arias won by less than two percentage points and surpassed the 40% threshold required to avoid a runoff by only a few thousand votes. The number of spoiled ballots exceeded the margin separating the two candidates. The PAC performed even more strongly in the legislative election, receiving approximately 27% of the vote and increasing its representation from 14 to 17 seats in the Legislative Assembly, which made it the second-largest parliamentary bloc and represented one of the fastest electoral advances achieved by a Costa Rican political party in the contemporary democratic era.

Following the election, Solís temporarily withdrew from active politics and spent a year teaching in the United States. During this period, discussions began within the party regarding its future leadership, led by former deputy Alberto Salom. Among the figures whose names were mentioned was former PLN secretary general Luis Guillermo Solís, who had become increasingly critical of his former party. Several PAC officials wanted Luis Guillermo Solís to run as a deputy in San José and as a vice presidential candidate in 2010. Solís formally joined the PAC in 2009. Soon afterward, he became involved in internal party discussions and strategy meetings, positioning himself as a prominent figure within the organization ahead of the 2014 election, in which he would eventually become the party's presidential candidate.

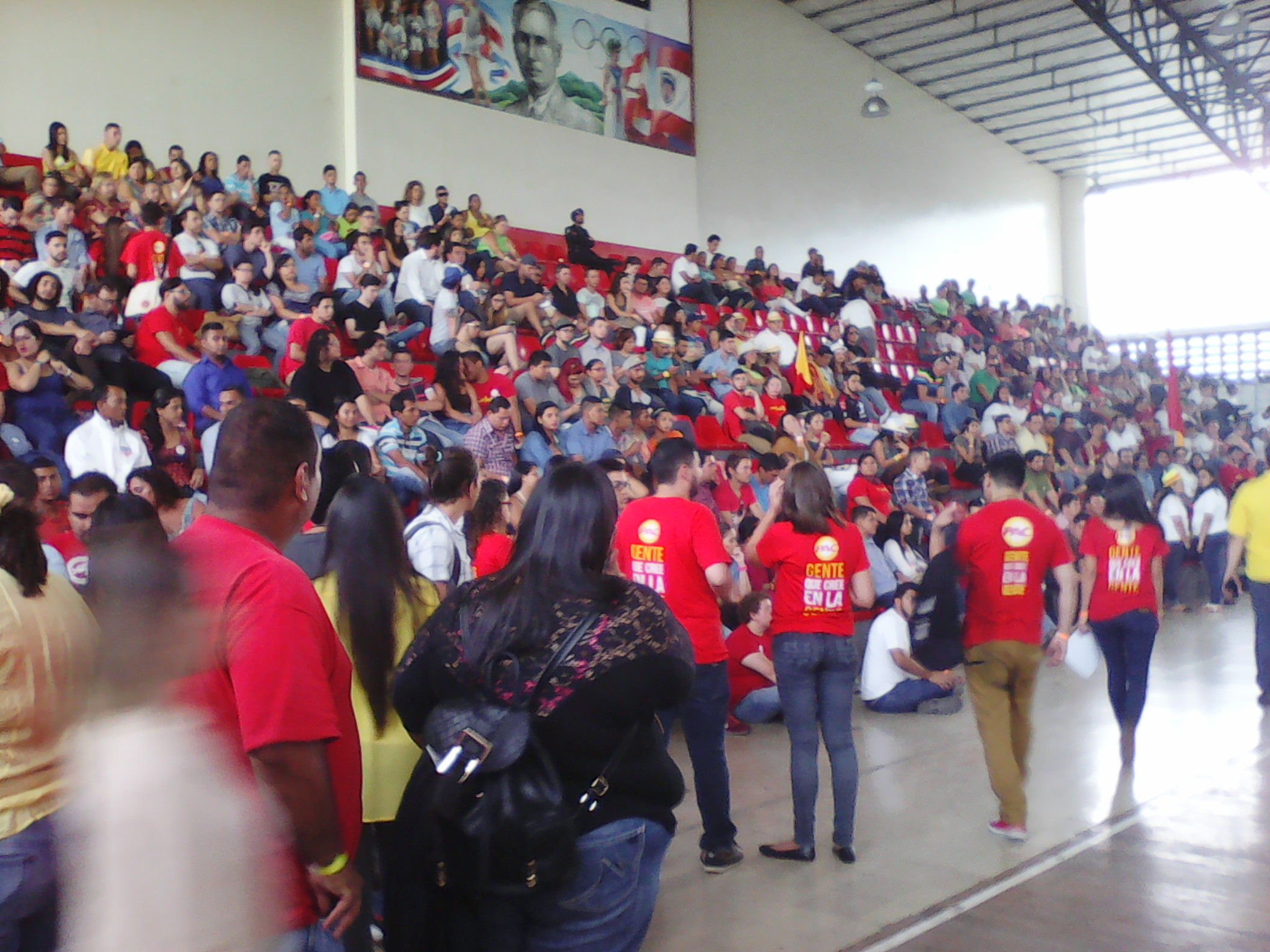
PAC's Youth General Assembly, 2016

=== 2010 election ===
In the 2010 election, Ottón Solís Fallas ran for the presidency for a third and final time as the Citizens' Action Party's candidate, after winning the 2009 primary election. In the general election, he received 25.2% of the vote, finishing second behind Laura Chinchilla of the National Liberation Party, who won the presidency. In the legislative election, the PAC won 11 seats in the Legislative Assembly. Although the party lost seats compared to its performance in 2006, it remained the principal opposition force to the incoming administration.

The party also strengthened its presence at the local level. In the subsequent municipal elections, PAC candidates were elected mayor in the cantons of Aserrí, Matina, Hojancha, Cañas, Los Chiles, and Guatuso, which marked an expansion of the party's influence beyond the Greater Metropolitan Area into several rural regions of the country.

=== 2014 election ===
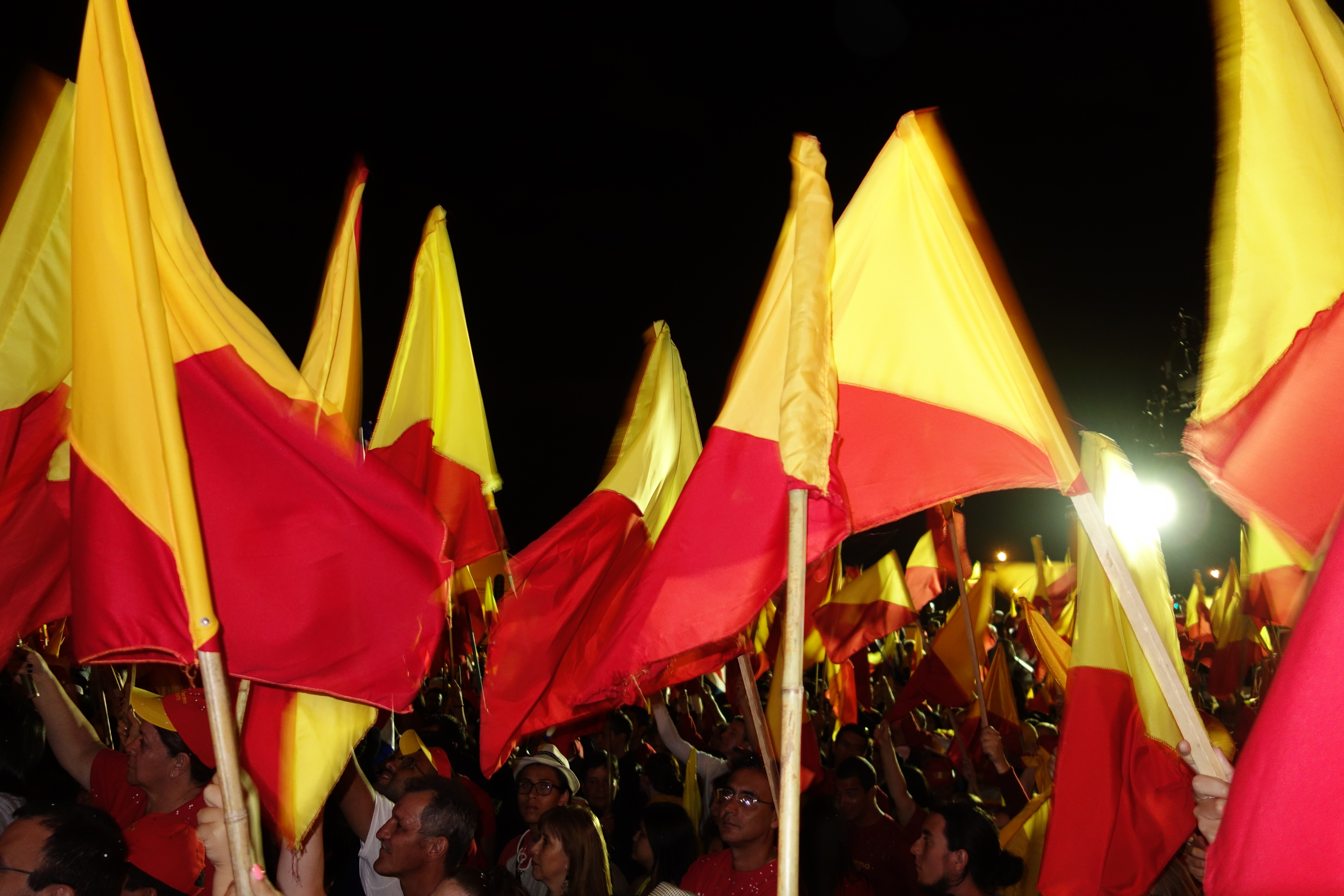
PAC supporters wave their traditional colors to celebrate Luis Guillermo Solís' victory on 6 April 2014

In July 2013, the PAC held its second national primary election, known as the "Convención Nacional Ciudadana". Unlike previous internal selection processes, it was conducted as an open primary, allowing any Costa Rican citizen to vote regardless of party affiliation. The decision marked a significant change in the party's internal procedures.

Four candidates competed for the PAC presidential nomination for the 2014 election: Epsy Campbell Barr, Juan Carlos Mendoza García, Luis Guillermo Solís, and Ronald Solís Bolaños. Luis Guillermo Solís won the nomination with approximately 35.5% of the vote.

During the general election campaign, Solís emerged as the principal challenger to the traditional parties and advanced to a runoff election against Johnny Araya Monge of the National Liberation Party. After Araya effectively suspended his campaign following the first round, Solís won the second round by a wide margin and was elected President of Costa Rica on 6 April 2014, becoming the first PAC candidate to win the presidency. In the concurrent legislative election, the PAC won 13 seats in the Legislative Assembly.

=== 2018 election ===
In July 2017, the PAC held its third national primary election ahead of the 2018 election. The contest was between two former members of President Luis Guillermo Solís's cabinet: Minister of Economy, Industry and Commerce Welmer Ramos González and Minister of Labor and Social Security Carlos Alvarado Quesada. Ramos, a socially conservative economist, was generally associated with the party's founding ottonista faction, while Alvarado, a writer and political scientist, was identified with the party's more progressive wing. Alvarado won the primary and became the PAC's presidential nominee.

The election took place amid declining public approval of the Solís administration, partly as a result of the Cementazo corruption scandal. During the campaign, however, the political landscape was reshaped by a ruling of the Inter-American Court of Human Rights calling on Costa Rica to recognize same-sex marriage. The decision generated significant public debate and contributed to the rapid rise of evangelical singer and conservative candidate Fabricio Alvarado Muñoz of the National Restoration Party. Carlos Alvarado campaigned in support of the implementation of the court's ruling and other progressive social policies. As the election became increasingly polarized around cultural and social issues, he emerged as the principal alternative to Fabricio Alvarado and advanced to the second round.

In the runoff election, held on 1 April 2018, Carlos Alvarado defeated Fabricio Alvarado by a wide margin, receiving 60.1% of the vote. With more than 1.3 million votes, he became the second PAC candidate to win the presidency and secured the party's second consecutive term in office. The result represented one of the largest margins of victory in a Costa Rican presidential runoff election.

== Platform ==
While cleaning up corruption has been one of PAC's main goals since its creation, Solís has added to the party's platform. He wants to build infrastructure, bolster Costa Rica's universal health care and social security systems and push for environmentally friendly policies. Historically, PAC has opposed free trade agreements such as CAFTA, which Solís claims is improperly implemented. In addition, PAC claims that the country's tax system is inadequate, saying that a more progressive system is needed.

=== International relations ===
PAC is a member of the Progressive Alliance. It maintains informal relations with other progressive and social democratic parties. Ottón Solís has independently met with Ricardo Lagos of the Socialist Party of Chile during a visit to Costa Rica, Cristina Fernández, and members of the Democratic Party of the United States.

== Controversies ==
=== Estafa cases ===
The party was affected in 2016 by a conviction for irregular handling of funds when treasurer Maynor Sterling and an official of the headquarters named Bolaños were found guilty of trying to collect from the Supreme Elections Court for goods and services donated by adherents of the party. The conviction carried a fine of 500 million colones and jail terms for the two involved. In December 2020, the PAC resorts to requesting donations to pay the debt for fraud to the State.

== Members ==
=== Other notable members of PAC ===
Notable Members of PAC
Name (Last, First)	Notes
Campbell Barr, Epsy	Vice President 2018–2022, Deputy 2002–2006 and 2014–2018, party president 2005–2009, politician, civil rights advocate
Blanco, Wilfrido	Vice Minister of Education Abel Pacheco administration (2002–2006). Former PLN member.
Carazo Zeledón, Rodrigo Alberto	National Ombudsman 1993–1997, and deputy 2002–2006. Son of ex-president Rodrigo Carazo Odio
Chacón Echeverría, Ana Helena	Minister of Public Safety (Abel Pacheco administration (2002–2006), deputy (2006–2010), daughter of Luis Manuel Chacón (founding member of PUSC), Vice President (2014).
Salom Echeverría, Alberto	president of the Costa Rican Federation of University Students 1974–1975, vice president of National University of Costa Rica 1995–2000, deputy for PAC (2006–2010).
Cañas Escalante, Alberto	founding member of PAC, secretary of the Founding Junta of the Second Republic 1948, United Nations ambassador 1948–1949, president Editorial Costa Rica, deputy 1962–1966, Legislative Assembly President 1994–1998, Prime Minister 1970–1974.
Fallas, Helio	Minister of Planning Rafael Ángel Calderón Fournier administration (1990–1994), Minister of Housing during Abel Pacheco administration (2002–2006), Vice President, 2014. Former PUSC member
Fonseca Corrales, Elizabeth	historian, professor Universidad de Costa Rica. 2010 leader of PAC fraction in National Assembly.
Miranda, Guido	Executive President Caja Costarricense del Seguro Social. Former PLN member.
Mendoza García, Juan Carlos	deputy 2010–2014, Factional President 2010-1011, and Legislative Assembly President 2011–2012.
Morales Mora, Víctor	Minister of Labor Miguel Ángel Rodríguez administration (1998–2002), and deputy (Calderón Fournier administration) 1990–1994, Aserrí Mayor. Former PUSC member.
Penón Góngora, Margarita	first lady of Costa Rica 1986–1990 (ex-wife of Óscar Arias) and deputy (2002–2006). Replaced by Aguilar Mirambell in 2005 after resignation.
Salas Bonilla, Jorge Antonio	Mayor of Tibás Cantón 2007–2011.
Solano, Hernán	Vice Minister of Youth Abel Pacheco administration (2002–2006). Former PUSC member.
Solís Fallas, Ottón	Minister of Planning Óscar Arias administration (1986–1988), deputy (Figueres administration) 1994–1998, founding member of PAC, three-time presidential candidate for PAC, deputy 2014–2018.
Solís Bolaños, Ronald	deputy with PAC 2006–2010, anti-CAFTA activist, businessman. Ran in PAC presidential primary in 2013.
Solís Rivera, Luis Guillermo	Politician, historian, professor of Latin American Studies. Ex PLN Secretary General. President Elect 2014–2018.
Trejos Lalli, Eduardo	Internationalist and advisor, current Intelligence Director
Villasuso, Juan Manuel	President of Costa Rican Institute of Electricity Luis Alberto Monge administration (1982–1983), Minister of Planning Luis Alberto Monge administration (1983–1986). Former PLN member.

== Electoral performance ==
=== Presidential ===
Election	Candidate	First round				Second round			
Election	Candidate	Votes	%	Position	Result	Votes	%	Position	Result
2002	Ottón Solís	400,681	26.19%	3rd	Lost				
2006	Ottón Solís	646,382	39.80%	▲2nd	Lost				
2010	Ottón Solís	464,454	25.15%	2nd	Lost				
2014	Luis Guillermo Solís	629,866	30.64%	▲1st	─	1,314,327	77.81%	1st	Won
2018	Carlos Alvarado Quesada	466,129	21.63%	▼2nd	─	1,322,908	60.59%	1st	Won
2022	Welmer Ramos González	13,803	0.66%	▼10th	Lost				
2026	Claudia Dobles Camargo	125.714	4.91%	▲3rd	Lost				

=== Parliamentary ===
Election	Leader	Votes	%	Seats	+/–	Position	Government
2002	Ottón Solís	334,162	22.0%	14 / 57	New	3rd	Opposition
2006	Ottón Solís	409,030	25.3%	17 / 57	▲3	▲2nd	Opposition
2010	Ottón Solís	334,636	17.6%	11 / 57	▼6	2nd	Opposition
2014	Luis Guillermo Solís	480,969	23.4%	13 / 57	▲2	2nd	Government
2018	Carlos Alvarado Quesada	347,703	16.3%	10 / 57	▼3	▼3rd	Government
2022	Welmer Ramos González	44,622	2.2%	0 / 57	▼10	▼7th	Extra-parliamentary
2026	Claudia Dobles Camargo	103,560	4.07%	1 / 57	▲1	▲4th	Opposition
