= Epsy Campbell Barr =

Costa Rican politician and economist (born 1963)

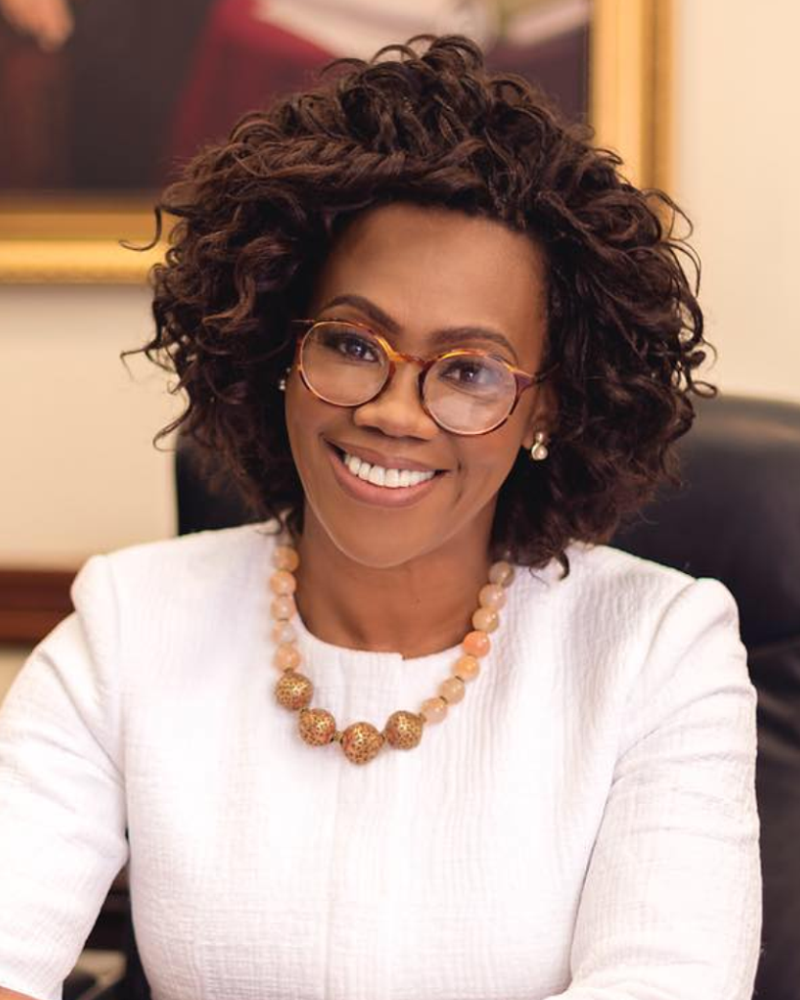
- Campbell in 2019

First Vice-President of Costa Rica
- In office 8 May 2018 – 8 May 2022 Serving with Marvin Rodríguez Cordero
- President: Carlos Alvarado
- Preceded by: Helio Fallas Venegas
- Succeeded by: Stephan Brunner

Minister of Foreign Affairs
- In office 8 May 2018 – 11 December 2018
- President: Carlos Alvarado
- Preceded by: Manuel González Sanz
- Succeeded by: Lorena Aguilar Revelo (Acting)

Deputy of the Legislative Assembly of Costa Rica
- In office 1 May 2014 – 30 April 2018
- Preceded by: Viviana Martín Salazar
- Succeeded by: Silvia Hernández Sánchez
- Constituency: San José (2nd Office)
- In office 1 May 2002 – 30 April 2006
- Preceded by: Sonia Picado Sotela
- Succeeded by: Alberto Salom Echeverría
- Constituency: San José (9th Office)

President of the Citizens' Action Party
- In office 12 February 2005 – 9 February 2009
- Preceded by: Ottón Solís
- Succeeded by: Alberto Cañas Escalante

Personal details
- Born: Epsy Alejandra Campbell Barr; 4 July 1963 (age 63) San José, Costa Rica
- Party: Citizens' Action Party (since 2000)
- Relations: Shirley Campbell Barr (sister)
- Education: University of Costa Rica (BA)
- Occupation: Economist; politician; activist; writer

Epsy Alejandra Campbell Barr (born 4 July 1963) is a Costa Rican economist and politician who served as First Vice President of Costa Rica from 2018 to 2022. A member of the Citizens' Action Party, she was the first woman of African descent to hold the vice presidency in Costa Rica and in Latin America.

One of the founders of the PAC, Campbell led the party from 2005 to 2009 and ran for its presidential nomination on two occasions. She also served as a deputy in the Legislative Assembly from 2002 to 2006 and from 2014 to 2018. In 2018, she was elected First Vice President alongside Carlos Alvarado and later served as Minister of Foreign Affairs from 8 May to 10 December 2018.

Campbell has been involved in initiatives related to racial equality and human rights. She promoted the establishment of the International Day for People of African Descent, later declared by the United Nations General Assembly. She also promoted and chaired the United Nations Permanent Forum on People of African Descent during the 2022-2024 term. She is the founder of the Global Coalition Against Systemic Racism and for Reparations, was elected president of the Centre for Sport and Human Rights in October 2024, succeeding Mary Robinson, and serves as executive president of the "Respect. No to Racism" campaign.

== Early life and education ==
Epsy Campbell attended secondary school at Liceo Franco Costarricense and graduated from Colegio Superior de Señoritas in 1980. She holds higher education degrees in business administration, sociology, and political science from the University of Costa Rica, economics from the Latin University of Costa Rica, a master's in Advanced Techniques of Management and Political Decision from the Gadex Program in Madrid, Spain, and a master's in International Cooperation for Development from the Cultural and Social Studies Foundation in Madrid. In 2021, she was awarded an honorary doctorate by Brenau University in Gainesville, Georgia.

Campbell is a researcher and human rights activist focusing on women's rights, indigenous peoples, Afro-descendants, human development, social inclusion, and the environment. She served as the coordinator of the Network of Afro-Latin American and Afro-Caribbean Women (1997–2001) and the coordinator of the Women's Forum for Central American Integration (1996–2001). Additionally, she was a member of the Alliance of Afro-descendant Peoples of Latin America and the Caribbean, a founding member of the Center for Afro-Costa Rican Women, and a national and international consultant on employment, community and Afro-descendant women development, women's human rights, racism, sexism, and discrimination. She is also a member of the Black Parliament of the Americas.

In Costa Rica, Campbell played a key role in the approval of the Inter-American Convention against Racism, Racial Discrimination, and Related Forms of Intolerance (2016). She was part of the committee that prepared the "Regional Human Development Report (RHDR) for Latin America and the Caribbean: Multidimensional Progress" (2016), coordinated by the United Nations Development Program. She has directed over 15 international investigations and authored 20 publications on social inclusion.

=== Family ===
Campbell is a descendant of Jamaican migrants and carries the name of her grandmother, Epsy, whom she considers her main life inspiration, as narrated in the book "Luchadoras" by the Inter-American Institute for Cooperation on Agriculture (IICA). According to the publication, her early political battles were won within her own home, being part of a large family—five sisters and two brothers:

As far back as I can remember, the distribution of responsibilities at home seemed unfair to me. According to Mom, one of the first phrases I learned was 'It's not fair!' It's not fair that the sisters wash the dishes and they don't; it's not fair that while they only clean the yard, we have to help in the kitchen; it's not fair that we make the beds and they don't. It's not fair! It's not fair!

Her sister Sasha is a renowned singer, journalist, and presenter. Her sister Shirley is an anthropologist, activist, and Afro-Costa Rican poet, author of the poem "Rotundamente negra", which has become a symbol for Afro-descendant women in Latin America. Her sister Doris is a professional actress, dancer, and contemporary dance instructor at the National Dance Workshop, while her other siblings—Narda, Luis, and Gustavo Campbell—have maintained more discreet profiles.

Campbell has been married since 2015 to Costa Rican entrepreneur Berny Venegas Durán.

== Organizations ==
Epsy Campbell has been the head of the Center for Women of African Descent, the Alliance of Leaders of African descent in Latin America and the Caribbean, and the Black Parliament of the Americas. She has participated in several conferences and meetings around the world, such as the Fourth World Conference on Women in Beijing, China, the III World Conference Against Racism in Durban, South Africa, the World Conference on the Environment, Eco 92, Rio de Janeiro, Brazil, and the First Encounter of Black Women of Latin America and the Caribbean, held in Santo Domingo, Dominican Republic. She was Coordinator of the Women's Forum for Central American Integration of the Network of Afro-Caribbean and Afro-Latin American Women and organizer of the Second Meeting of Afro-Caribbean and Afro-Latin American Women in San Jose, Costa Rica. Campbell is also member of the Washington D.C.–based think tank The Inter-American Dialogue. She has written books and articles on topics such as democracy, inclusion, political and economic participation of women, people of African descent, sexism and racism, among others. She is an expert on issues of social development, equity, political participation of women and African descent.

== Political career ==
Campbell was a deputy of the Citizen Action Party for the 2002–2006 term, serving as leader from 2003 to 2006 and as the party's president from 2005 to 2009.

After serving in the legislature for four years (2002–2006) and running for vice president in 2006, Campbell decided to seek the nomination of the PAC. She traveled the country in an RV, taking her anti-corruption and accountability message to PAC voters. Three other candidates vied to represent PAC in the 2014 national elections: Juan Carlos Mendoza, Luis Guillermo Solís, and Ronald Solís Bolaños. As of February 2013, she was the most popular opposition candidate; however, she bowed out of the race to Luis Guillermo Solís. Solís became Costa Rica's president elect in March 2014.

In March 2014, Campbell won a deputy position in San Jose as a PAC candidate. When Solís became the de facto president elect, he mentioned that Campbell would be one of his choices for President of the Legislative Assembly, although Henry Mora Jiménez became the President of the Legislative Assembly in May 2014.

=== Congresswoman ===
During her terms as a deputy, Campbell focused primarily on issues related to structural fiscal reform, emphasizing the progressivity of the tax system and efficiency in public spending. In January 2016, she called on fellow deputies to discuss the need for a fiscal agreement to steer public finances toward sustainability.

She championed the constitutional reform for the removal of deputies who failed in their duty of probity, the proposal to repeal the National Intelligence and Security Directorate (DIS), the initiative to regulate lobbying in public functions, the declaration of August as the historical month of Afro-descendants in Costa Rica, the Law to Prevent and Punish All Forms of Discrimination, Racism, and Intolerance, a bill to prohibit the commercialization of illegal lotteries, and the Law against Street Harassment.

As a member of the Commission on Control of Income and Public Spending, she participated in investigations on the setting of rates by the Regulatory Authority for Public Services, the lack of execution of funds from an international loan with the International Bank for Reconstruction and Development to finance the Limón Ciudad-Puerto project, as well as the government's intention to acquire the El Tobogán Corporate Center to build the so-called "Government City". She also served on the Human Rights, International Relations, Economic Affairs, and Women's commissions.

=== Vice President ===
Campbell initially announced her intention to run in the PAC presidential primary for the 2018 presidential election, but withdrew from the race on 27 March 2017. However, she was subsequently selected by nominee Carlos Alvarado Quesada as one of two joint running mates, alongside Marvin Rodríguez. She condemned remarks by PIN candidate Juan Diego Castro alleging that female members of the Judiciary advanced in promotions due to sexual favors. Alvarado Quesada eventually advanced to the runoff and won, with Campbell becoming the first Afrodescendant vice-president of the country.

During her tenure, she led the "Northern Zone Development Strip" program to address inequalities in the border region with Nicaragua. She was also in charge of the "National Plan for Economic Empowerment and Leadership of Women" and advocated for a series of initiatives benefiting the Afro-descendant population, such as the declaration of the International Day of Afro-descendants.

In various polls conducted by both private companies and the University of Costa Rica, she maintained high popularity until 2018, being considered "one of the most influential figures in Costa Rican politics" since 2002.

=== Chancellor ===
After being elected vice president alongside the presidential formula of Carlos Alvarado Quesada, Campbell assumed the position of Minister of Foreign Relations (MREC) on 8 May 2018, becoming the first woman to hold the position of Chancellor of Costa Rica.

Campbell established, for the first time, the axes of foreign policy via Executive Decree: environmental and climate change diplomacy, diplomacy for innovation, knowledge, and education, diplomacy for social inclusion, culture, and gender parity, diplomacy for peace, democracy, transparency, and the fight against corruption, economic and trade diplomacy, multilateral diplomacy, regional diplomacy, and bilateral diplomacy. Additionally, she created the Presidential Council for International Cooperation, Foreign Policy, and International Business to monitor these axes and promote economic diplomacy.

She made official visits to Panama, Colombia, Italy, the Vatican and Spain to strengthen bilateral relations and expressed Costa Rica's position regarding the crises in Nicaragua and Venezuela at the Organization of American States, the EU-CELAC summit, and the UN General Assembly.

During her tenure, the crisis in Nicaragua was a prominent issue given the relevance of events in that country for Costa Rica, particularly with the migratory phenomenon. Campbell advocated for an immediate cessation of repression against protesters and arbitrary detention, urging respect and guarantee of fundamental rights such as freedom of expression and political participation. She also proposed the creation of an international investigation mechanism with autonomy and advocated for a commitment to the Inter-American Commission on Human Rights to follow up on the implementation of recommendations.

In line with the Lima Group, Costa Rica did not recognize the legitimacy of the electoral process in Venezuela on 20 May 2018. The country maintained a chargé d'affaires instead of an ambassador and advocated for the intervention of the Organization of American States and a national agreement to address the crisis in Venezuela. Also, it urged to stop violence, release political prisoners, ensure human rights, and achieve a peaceful resolution of the conflict by calling on the forces of Venezuelan society to find viable solutions and common points of interest.

During Campbell's tenure as Chancellor, "country profiles" were introduced as a tool to identify opportunities in diplomatic representations abroad. For the first time, ambassadors were required to publicly present a work plan aligned with the objectives of Foreign Policy before arriving at their destination countries. Additionally, a study was conducted to explore the relaxation of Chinese visas, and the document was presented to institutions such as the General Directorate of Migration and Immigration, the Ministry of Foreign Trade, the Ministry of Security, and the Costa Rican Tourism Institute.

Technical criteria were established in the allocation of office expenses abroad, and new guidelines for personnel hiring were implemented, favoring the application of the legislation of host countries to reduce conflicts and costs to the public treasury. A Budget Planning and Execution System was implemented as a computerized tool to comply with the Procurement and Contracting Manual, facilitate administrative-financial management, and enhance accountability for embassies.

Concerning the diplomatic career, the competitive examination was continued, concluding academic tests and interviews with 27 eligible individuals, including 14 who were already appointed. A rotation competition abroad was held, appointing 11 diplomats to Costa Rican missions through the application of the "inopia" figure in favor of the diplomatic career. Consultation with the budgetary authority was carried out on promotions in the Foreign Service, and a competition was opened for the appointment of directors at the Ministry of Foreign Affairs, aiming to correct historical practices and promote the professionalization of the service.

=== Others ===
Campbell has played roles in various national and international projects, including serving as a consultant in the "Public Inclusion Policies for Women and Afro-descendant Communities in the Americas and the Caribbean" project carried out in collaboration with the Spanish Agency for International Development Cooperation (AECID) and the Association for the Development of Black Costa Rican Women between 2015 and 2017.

She was also a member of the committee responsible for preparing the "Regional Human Development Report (RHDR) for Latin America and the Caribbean: Multidimensional Progress" in 2016, coordinated by the United Nations Development Programme (UNDP). Additionally, she served as a coordinator for events such as the "V Meeting of Afro-descendant Parliamentarians and Political Leaders of the Americas and the Caribbean 2016" and the "Dialogue of Afro-descendant Parliamentarians and Leaders of the Americas" in 2016.

In addition to her role as a professor at the University of Costa Rica, she has led projects such as the analysis and monitoring of the incorporation of Afro-descendants in the Americas, funded by AECID between 2011 and 2013. She has also worked as an international consultant on intercultural gender democracy with UNDP in 2011 and served as a consultant for UNICEF on Afro-descendants in 2006-2007 and 2008–2011.

==== International Day for People of African Descent ====
Campbell was the driving force behind the International Day for People of African Descent, declared by the United Nations General Assembly through Resolution 75/170 on 16 December 2020.

In August 1920, the First International Convention of the Black Peoples of the World was held in New York. As a result of discussions led by Marcus Garvey with thousands of delegates from different countries, the Declaration of the Rights of the Negro Peoples of the World was adopted. Article 53 of this declaration proclaimed 31 August of each year as an international day to celebrate black peoples.

According to Campbell, the intention behind proclaiming the International Day for People of African Descent was to do justice to the struggles, hopes, and resistances, bringing to light this milestone in the context of the growing mobilization for racial justice, equality, and inclusion of millions of people under the Black Lives Matter motto.

==== United Nations Permanent Forum on People of African Descent ====
On 21 December 2021, the United Nations General Assembly selected Campbell as one of the ten members of the Permanent Forum on People of African Descent. This forum, acting as an advisory body to the UN Human Rights Council, is composed of ten independent experts with recognized expertise in Afro-descendant issues and human rights. These experts serve in a voluntary capacity and are not part of the United Nations staff, receiving no financial compensation.

The composition of this advisory mechanism follows geographical criteria: five members are elected by the United Nations General Assembly, while the other five are appointed by Afro-descendant organizations. These experts work individually, with terms lasting three years and the possibility of re-election.

The initiative to establish this forum arose after Campbell advocated before the General Assembly and in various bilateral meetings for the urgency of creating this body with the purpose of improving the quality of life for Afro-descendant people worldwide.

== Controversies ==
During her tenure as Vice President and Minister of Foreign Affairs of Costa Rica, Campbell was the subject of various political and administrative controversies.

In 2008, Campbell was contracted during the Arias Sánchez administration by the Ministry of National Planning and Economic Policy to provide consulting services for a proposed reform of the Internal Regulations of the Legislative Assembly. She received criticism from within her own party because the contract was not awarded through a public bidding process.

In 2018, Campbell faced scrutiny over a series of appointments made within the Ministry of Foreign Affairs and Worship during her tenure as Minister of Foreign Affairs. The Office of the Attorney General opened an investigation into alleged irregular appointments, while the Office of the Comptroller General concluded that some of the disputed positions could not be classified as positions of trust and therefore had to comply with the requirements established under the Foreign Service Statute. In December 2018, Campbell resigned as Minister of Foreign Affairs, although she remained in office as First Vice President of the Republic.

During her tenure as Minister of Foreign Affairs, Campbell also received criticism from opposition sectors regarding the frequency of her international travel. Several legislators requested explanations concerning the costs associated with these trips and questioned the use of public funds, particularly in relation to the participation of her husband in some official missions.

In 2020, another controversy arose concerning a property located in Oreamuno, Cartago, of which Campbell was listed as a co-owner together with members of her family. According to press reports, the property had maintained a tax assessment that had not been updated for several years. Campbell stated that she was not the usufructuary of the property and therefore bore no direct tax responsibility for its administration. She additionally requested that her relatives seek an updated appraisal from the local municipality.

That same year, the Vice President was excluded from an official presidential trip amid political tensions stemming from ongoing investigations and public criticism. Several media outlets described the incident as part of a broader political crisis within the administration.

Campbell was also the target of attempts at political censure by legislators from the New Republic party. However, constitutional law experts argued that the proposed censure mechanism did not exist for the office of Vice President under Costa Rican constitutional law, and therefore the initiative lacked binding legal effect.

== Awards ==
- "Powerful Women", 2019. Forbes.
- "Most Influential Women in the Region", 2019. Strategy and Business Magazine.
- "Leadership Award", 2019. African Renaissance and Diaspora Network.
- "Most Influential Afro-descendant Leaders in the World", 2019. Most Influential People of African Descent (MIPAD).
- "Youth Champion", 2019. United Nations Children's Fund (UNICEF), for the "Generation Unlimited" strategy.
- "Distinguished Visitor of Montevideo", 2021. Montevideo City Hall.
- "Key to the City of Panama" and "Guest of Honor of the Panama District", 2018.

Assembly seats
Preceded by Sonia Picado Sotela	Deputy of the Legislative Assembly of Costa Rica for San José's 9th office 2002–2006	Succeeded by Alberto Salom Echeverría
Party political offices
Preceded by Helio Fallas Venegas	PAC nominee for First-Vice President of Costa Rica; 2018	Succeeded by Emilia Molina Cruz
Political offices
Preceded by Helio Fallas Venegas	First Vice-President of Costa Rica; 2018–2022	Succeeded by Stephan Brunner
Preceded by Manuel González Sanz	Minister of Foreign Affairs; 2018	Succeeded by Lorena Aguilar Revelo; Acting
