= Guido Miranda =

Costa Rican civil servant and medical doctor (1925–2019)

Executive Director, Caja Costarricense de Seguro Social
- In office 1982–1990
- President: Luis Monge and Óscar Arias Administrations

Personal details
- Born: 23 July 1925 San José, Costa Rica
- Died: 20 February 2019 (aged 93)
- Party: Citizens' Action Party
- Other political affiliations: Formerly National Liberation Party

Guido Miranda Gutiérrez (23 July 1925 – 20 February 2019) was a Costa Rican civil servant and medical doctor. Miranda is credited with spearheading the effort to push the Costa Rican Department of Social Insurance (Caja Costarricense de Seguro Social) from the capital of San José into smaller municipalities and rural regions.

== Education ==
Miranda studied at Liceo de Costa Rica (Costa Rica High School) in San José. He obtained a bachelor's in science and letters in 1942 before going to study medicine and surgery at the University of Chile, where he graduated in 1949. He joined the Association of Doctors and Surgeons in Costa Rica in 1950 and began working as an intern San Juan de Dios Hospital in San José. Between 1951 and 1953, he studied at Cornell University and the University of Rochester.

== National work ==
After studying in the United States, Miranda worked in various positions at San Juan de Dios Hospital, Central Hospital, and México Hospital, all within the San José area. He founded the Costa Rican Association of Internal Doctors.

Miranda began working for The Costa Rican Department of Social Insurance (Caja Costarricense de Seguro Social), Costa Rica's national social security and health care system when it first began. Miranda helped plan the construction of México Hospital and served as its Chief of Medicine from 1971 to 1978. Between 1982 and 1990, Miranda worked as Executive President of the CCSS, serving under presidents Luis Monge Álvarez and Óscar Arias. In this role, Miranda had a profound effect on the delivery of medical services to citizens, especially expanding its reach into rural areas. During his time working for the CCSS, Miranda was able to shepherd it through several economic crisis. He came up with payment schemes based on Britain's national healthcare system that kept the CCSS viable.

== Political philosophy ==
Miranda is highly critical of recent developments to lower the CCSS services. While receiving the Rodrigo Facio Brenes Prize, Miranda claimed that society is becoming less just because minimum wages are falling and the previous guarantee of a national pension is disappearing. As such, Miranda left the National Liberation Party and joined the Citizens' Action Party.

== Personal life and death ==
Miranda died on 20 February 2019, at the age of 93.

== Awards ==
"We do not want social security markets, we want real thinkers and reformers, like Dr. Guido Miranda."

— Dr. José Ángel Vargas

Miranda was awarded a Meritorious Commendation from the organization Seguridad Social de Centro América y Panamá in 1983. In 1989, the Organization for Pan-American Health awarded him the Latin American Prize for the Administration of Health Services. In 2000, Miranda received an honorary degree from National Distance Education University. He is an honorary member of the National Academy of Medicine. For his work in expanding medical coverage and care, the Association of Journalists named him "Person of the Decade" in the 1980s. Miranda was also the recipient in 2012 of the Rodrigo Facio Brenes Prize, a prize given every two years in Costa Rica to a person who has contributed to the general development of political, social, and economic well-being of the country.
