= Ana Helena Chacón =

Costa Rican politician (born 1961)

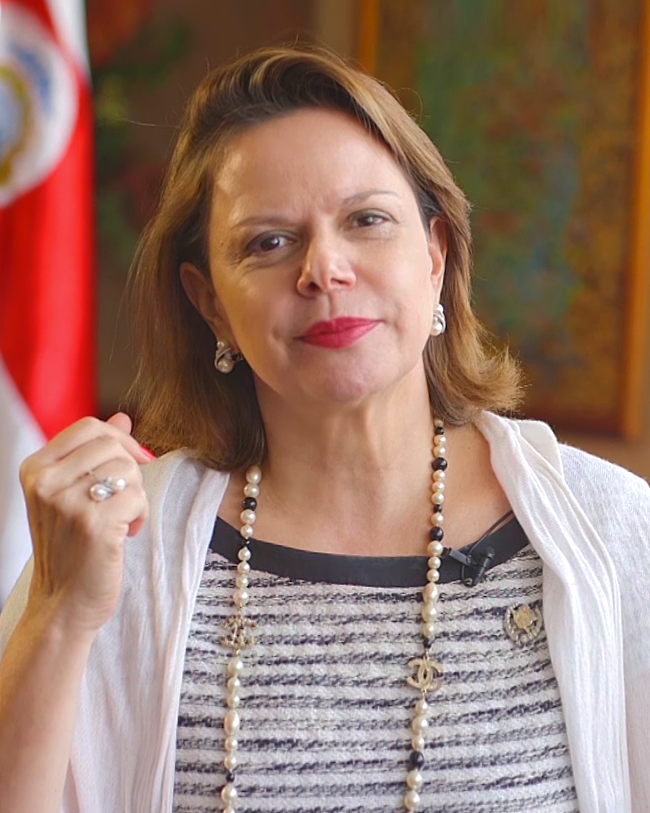
- Chacón in 2016

Second Vice-President of Costa Rica
- In office 8 May 2014 – 8 May 2018 Serving with Helio Fallas Venegas
- President: Luis Guillermo Solís
- Preceded by: Luis Liberman
- Succeeded by: Marvin Rodríguez Cordero

Ambassador of Costa Rica to Spain
- In office 1 August 2018 – 1 August 2022
- President: Carlos Alvarado Quesada; Rodrigo Chaves Robles
- Preceded by: Doris Osterlof Obregón
- Succeeded by: Adriana Bolaños Argueta

Deputy of the Legislative Assembly of Costa Rica
- In office 1 May 2006 – 30 April 2010
- Preceded by: Kyra Dunia de la Rosa
- Succeeded by: Gloria Bejarano Almada
- Constituency: San José (16th Office)

Vice-Minister of Public Safety
- In office 8 May 2002 – 16 June 2005
- President: Abel Pacheco
- Preceded by: María Fullmen Salazar Elizondo
- Succeeded by: Ethel Pazos Jiménez

Personal details
- Born: Ana Helena Chacón Echeverría; November 11, 1961 (age 64) San José, Costa Rica
- Party: PAC (since 2010)
- Other political affiliations: PUSC (1983–2010)
- Children: 2
- Education: Latin University of Costa Rica (BA)
- Occupation: Diplomat; politician; activist

Ana Helena Chacón Echeverría (born 11 November 1961) is a Costa Rican diplomat, activist and politician who served as Second Vice-president of Costa Rica from 2014 to 2018 and as Ambassador to Spain from 2018 to 2022. A member of the Citizens' Action Party, her political career has been dedicated to issues of feminism, human rights, and public health policy. Previously a cabinet minister and deputy, Chacón has also served on numerous committees and conferences on the national and international level.

== Personal life ==
Chacón was born in San José on 11 November 1961 to Luis Manuel Chacón, a former leader in the Social Christian Unity Party (PUSC for its Spanish initials). She lives in Goicoechea with her two daughters. She has been cited twice for violating employer delinquency laws by not paying employer contributions to the Costa Rican Social Security Fund, once in 2001 and once in 2004. Both cases were resolved after hearings.

Chacón trained as an international relations expert and has served in numerous public policy organizations. In 2011, she served on the United Nations' Global Commission on HIV and the Law Reviews Legal Barriers Obstructing Progress on AIDS in Asia-Pacific. From 2011 to 2013, she served on the board of directors for Fundación PANIAMOR, a non-profit organization that supports the rights of children.

== Political career ==
Chacón served as Vice Minister of Public Safety during the Abel Pacheco administration (2002–2006). She then served as a deputy in the Legislative Assembly of Costa Rica from 2006 to 2010 for PUSC. At the time, she worked with the block of deputies who were in favor of the Central American Free Trade Agreement (CAFTA). Chacón expressed interest in favor of in vitro fertilization, the rights of children, and same-sex marriage. Some of these issues put her in direct ideological conflict with others members of her party.

In 2010, Chacón left PUSC to create a new party with other ex-PUSC members, the Christian Democratic and Social Party (CDS for its Spanish initials). PCDS never fielded any candidates, but remained active as an arm of PUSC.

In 2014, Chacón became Luis Guillermo Solís' second vice presidential candidate, alongside Helio Fallas. Her selection was a surprise to many PAC followers given her support of CAFTA during the Arias administration and her past association with PUSC. She explained the disagreement about CAFTA by saying that it had not been implemented correctly, citing problems of corruptions, ethics, and transparency.

In 2018, Carlos Alvarado elected her as new Costa Rican Ambassador in Madrid, Spain.

== Political philosophy ==
As a deputy, Chacón often clashed with PUSC, her own party, supporting such initiatives as the right to in vitro fertilization, same sex marriage, and abortion in the case of fetal health. Chacón also expressed interest in issues of adolescent pregnancy, domestic violence, and poverty. She believes that extreme poverty in Costa Rica can be eliminated within four years of good governance. She marched in support of LGBT rights during an annual parade in 2015.

Upon joining PAC, Chacón was open about her dislike of President Laura Chinchilla's policies with regard to women, saying that they were ignored by the former president. Of Chinchilla, Chacón said that "she has not worn the clothes of a woman in order to govern like a woman, because she is just another politician." Chacón also expressed grievances about how CAFTA is implemented, but nevertheless stood by her support of it, claiming that it is too early to analyze the positive or negative impact of the free trade agreement.
