= Ronald Solís Bolaños =

Costa Rican politician

Deputy Legislative Assembly of Costa Rica
- In office 2006–2010
- Constituency: San José

Personal details
- Party: Citizens' Action Party
- Profession: Businessman, politician

Ronald Solís Bolaños is a Costa Rican businessman and politician. He served as a deputy in the Legislative Assembly.

== Biographic information ==
Solís Bolaños runs an agricultural business. He was Vice President of the Chamber of Commerce For Costa Rica (Cámara Empresarios Pro Costa Rica).

Solís Bolaños supported creating a national referendum for the Central American Free Trade Agreement. He opposed its ratification.

== Deputy ==
As a member of the Citizens' Action Party (PAC for its Spanish initials), Solís Bolaños became a deputy for the 2006 to 2010 legislative session. He remained a critic of CAFTA, claiming that profits stay within companies that open branches in Costa Rica, rather than remaining with the citizens of the country or the workers. He cited the case of Walmart as an example, saying their prices were artificial and led to lower prices for domestic products, such as beef.

== Run for president ==
Solís Bolaños began his campaign to be PAC's presidential candidate in February 2013. Although he remained a member of the party, he expressed displeasure with the PAC's internal elections process. He disagreed that a group of 80 assemblymen and women elected the presidential candidate, saying that the internal voting should be open to all PAC party members. Solís Bolaños also supported creating a voting bloc alliance with other parties, which many members of PAC disagreed with.

As he opened his campaign, Solís Bolaños expressed his displeasure with the Chinchilla administration and his approval of PAC's primary's democratic system. He ran against Epsy Campbell Barr, Juan Carlos Mendoza, and Luis Guillermo Solís. Solís Bolaños received only 4% of the PAC's votes and conceded to Luis Guillermo Solís who went on to win the election. He remains a member of PAC.
