= Wilfrido Blanco =

Costa Rican politician

Wilfrido Blanco Mora

Vice-Minister of Public Education
- In office 2002–2006
- President: Abel Pacheco

Personal details
- Citizenship: Costa Rica
- Party: Citizens' Action Party

Wilfrido Blanco Mora is a Costa Rican educator, civil servant, and political activist. Blanco served as Vice-Minister of Education during Abel Pacheco's presidency. During his time in office, he promoted student security, greater access to education, and higher student achievement. Under Blanco's administration, the Ministry of Public Education began requiring teaching candidates to present a criminal record with applications for teaching positions.

He was a former member of the Partido Unidad Social Cristiana (PUSC for its Spanish initials) and a current member of the Citizens' Action Party (PAC for its Spanish initials).
