= Juan Manuel Villasuso =

President, Instituto Costarricense de Electricidad
- In office 1981–1983

Minister of Planning
- In office 1983–1986
- President: Luis Alberto Monge

Personal details
- Citizenship: Costa Rica
- Party: Citizens' Action Party
- Other political affiliations: Formerly National Liberation Party

Juan Manuel Villasuso Estomba is a Costa Rican politician, writer and civil servant. He is a former member of the National Liberation Party (PLN for its Spanish initials) and a current member of the Citizens' Action Party (PAC for its Spanish initials).

== Professional, academic and political work ==
Instituto Costarricense de Electricidad building where Villasuso served as President

Villasuso studied at the University of Costa Rica in 1971, earning a degree in economics. He also studied at Louisiana State University, earning a Master of Science in economics in 1973.

From 1978 to 1982, Villasuso directed the UCR's Institute for Economic Research. In 1982 and 1983, he was the President of the Instituto Costarricense de Electricidad, the country's governing electricity distributor. From 1983 to 1986, he served as Minister of Planning for Luis Alberto Monge's administration. In addition, he served on the Central Bank's executive board. Between 1981 and 2007, Villasuso was President of the Costa Rican Economic Science Professional Organization.

In 2007, Villasuso came out strongly against the Central American Free Trade Agreement, editorializing against it and supporting PAC, which led the opposition to CAFTA.

Villasuso is a professor of economics and politics at the University of Costa Rica and coordinator of the Central American Node of Latin American Networking Commerce. He directs the Society of Information Recognition Program at the UCR.

== International work ==
In addition to working domestically in Costa Rica, Villasuso has considerable experience working in international affairs, mostly in economic development. From 2007 to 2010, he was a collaborating researcher with the United Nations Research Institute for Social Development. Specifically, he researched poverty reduction in Costa Rica. Villasuso has also worked for the Panamerican Health Organization, the World Bank, the UN Development Program, and the Interamerican Institute for Agricultural Cooperation.
