= Helio Fallas Venegas =

Costa Rica economist and politician (born 1947)

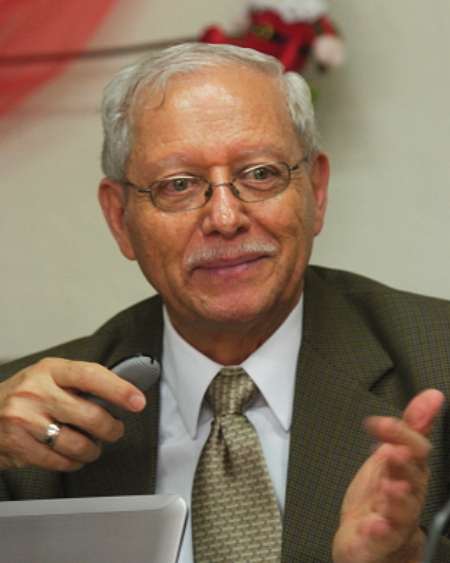
- Fallas in 2012

First Vice-President of Costa Rica
- In office 8 May 2014 – 8 May 2018 Serving with Ana Helena Chacón
- President: Luis Guillermo Solís
- Preceded by: Alfio Piva
- Succeeded by: Epsy Campbell Barr

Minister of Finance
- In office 8 May 2014 – 8 May 2018
- President: Luis Guillermo Solís
- Preceded by: Edgar Ayales Esna
- Succeeded by: Rocío Aguilar Montoya

Minister of Housing and Human Settlements
- In office 8 May 2002 – 27 June 2005
- President: Abel Pacheco
- Preceded by: Lorena Vásquez Badilla
- Succeeded by: Ángelo Altamura Carriero

Minister of National Planning and Economic Policy
- In office 1990–1992
- President: Rafael Ángel Calderón Fournier
- Preceded by: Jorge Monge Agüero
- Succeeded by: Carlos Vargas Pagán

Personal details
- Born: Helio Fallas Venegas; 22 March 1947 (age 79) San José, Costa Rica
- Party: PAC (since 2005)
- Other political affiliations: PUSC (until 2005)
- Spouse: Nuria Mas Herrera (m. 1970)
- Children: 3
- Education: University of Costa Rica (BA); University of Los Andes (MA)
- Occupation: Economist; politician; consultant; professor; writer

Helio Fallas Venegas (born 22 March 1947) is a Costa Rican economist and politician who served as First Vice President of Costa Rica and Minister of Finance from 2014 to 2018. A member of the Citizens' Action Party, he previously served as Minister of Housing from 2002 to 2005. Fallas' main economic interest was national public policy. He generally opposes free trade and supports public social programs. Fallas has served in three separate presidential administrations.

== Career ==
Fallas earned a degree in economics from the University of Costa Rica and a master's degree from the University of Los Andes. Fallas was a member of the Social Christian Unity Party (PUSC for its Spanish initials) before joining Citizens' Action Party (PAC for its Spanish initials).

Fallas joined the administration of Rafael Ángel Calderón Fournier (1990–1994) as Minister of Planning. He was also Minister of Housing during Abel Pacheco's administration (2002–2006), quitting in 2005. Fallas resigned after facing criticism from Pacheco and PUSC over the amount of money available for low-income housing. In addition, he was a consultant on the State of the Nation.

Between administrations, Fallas has worked as an independent economic consultant.

Fallas left PUSC, the party of both Calderón and Pacheco, to join the PAC. In 2013, Fallas became PAC's vice-presidential candidate, running with Luis Guillermo Solís, and fellow vice-presidential running-mate Ana Helena Chacón Echeverría. The campaign was successful, resulting in a victory for Solís when the National Liberation Party ceased campaigning after the end of the first round of voting.

In addition of serving as first vice president, he was the minister of finance.

== Economic and social philosophy ==
Fallas follows PAC's platform of concern for the health of the national economy, citing corruption and poor budgeting as problems. Like most members of PAC, he is opposed to the Central American Free Trade Agreement. Fallas has also expressed an interest in rural poverty in Costa Rica and Central America. Of particular concern to Fallas in recent years has been what he describes as a reliance on overseas development and too few incentives for local economic growth. Fallas is also worried about the prevalence of sexual tourism in Costa Rica, citing the number of internet sites that promote the practice. As vice-president, Fallas claims that he will consider state spending and the implementation of responsible taxes as economic changes. Fallas says he is sensitive to the middle class, workforce development, and social programs.

Fallas writes extensively on economic topics, including editorials, for El País, La Nación, La Tribuna Democrática, and other Central American newspapers.

== Personal life ==
Fallas is married to Nuria Más. He has three children (Luis Diego, Javier and Marcela) and three grandchildren (Daniela, Gabriel and Andrés), who he enjoys taking swimming.

In 2008, Fallas was aboard TACA Flight 390 when it crashed in Honduras. During the crash, the President of the Central American Bank for Economic Integration was killed and Fallas received considerable injuries, especially to his spinal column. He was flown to a hospital in Miami, Florida to receive emergency treatment and rehabilitation. Fallas claims that he is now in good health and is able to perform his political duties. For exercise, Fallas takes frequent walks.
