= Jorge Antonio Salas Bonilla =

Costa Rican politician

Licentiate Jorge Antonio Salas Bonilla
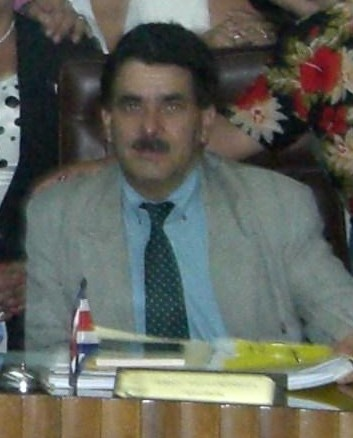

Mayor
- In office 2007–2011

Personal details
- Born: 2 January 1953 (age 73) Heredia, Costa Rica
- Party: Citizens' Action Party
- Other political affiliations: National Liberation Party
- Spouse: Lorena Azofeifa
- Children: Two
- Profession: Lawyer and Civil Servant

Jorge Antonio Salas Bonilla is a Costa Rican lawyer and politician. He was mayor of Tibás between 2007 and 2011.

== Early life ==
Salas was born in Heredia on 2 January 1953. He moved to Tibás when he was thirteen and attended Liceo Mauro Fernández (Mauro Fernández High School). He studied law at the University of Costa Rica, becoming a licentiate. Salas is married with two children.

== PLN years ==
In 1985, he joined the National Liberation Party (PLN for its Spanish initials). As a member of the PLN, Salas supported José Miguel Corrales Bolaños during the 1998 presidential election. Both Salas and Corrales would later leave the PLN, with Salas joining the Citizens' Action Party (PAC for its Spanish initials) and Corrales joining the socialist New Motherland Party.

== Joining PAC ==
Following a series of corruption scandals in the PLN, Salas joined the exodus from the party. Salas became a member of the PAC. He served as a cantonal and provincial delegate as well as a legal adviser to the Tibás municipality's PAC fraction. He was later elected register in February 2006. He was elected president of the City Council in May 2006. In December 2007, he became mayor of Tibás. Among his goals as mayor, Salas wanted to modernize the city with infrastructure improvements.
