= Ottón Solís =

Costa Rican politician (born 1954)

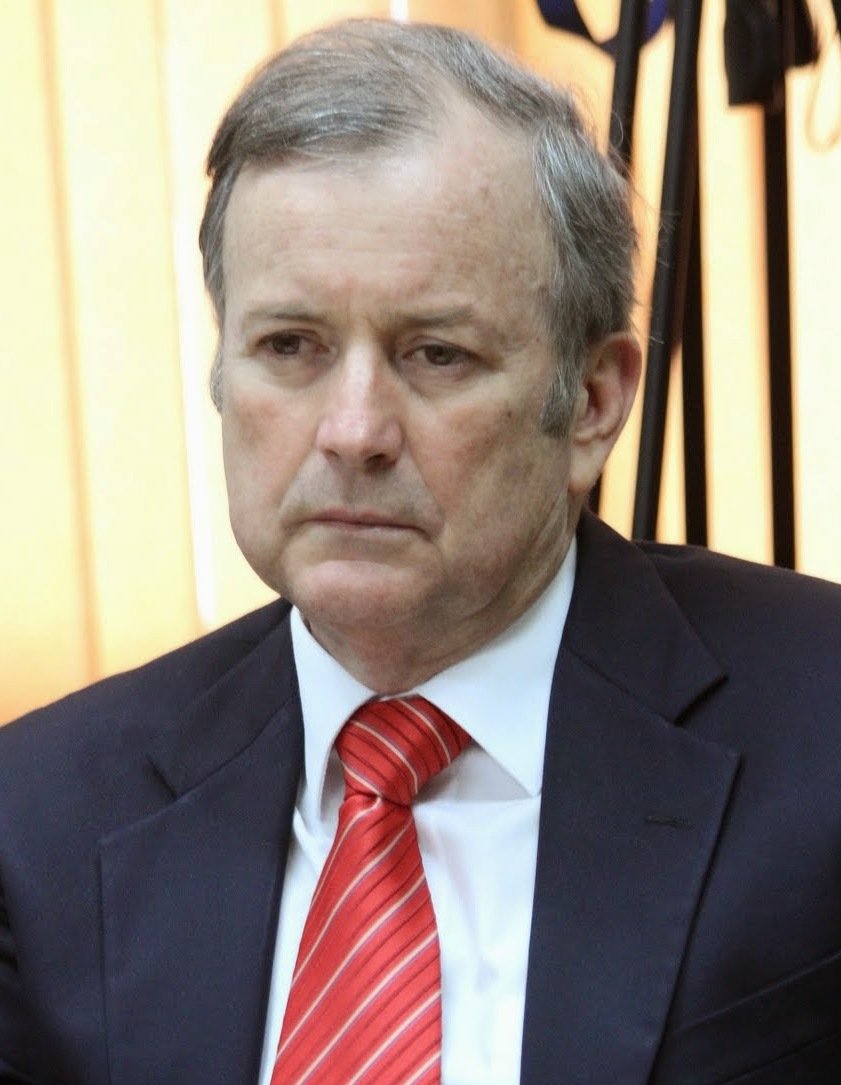
- Solís in 2014

Permanent Representative to the Organisation for Economic Co-operation and Development
- In office 6 July 2021 – 14 July 2021
- President: Carlos Alvarado Quesada
- Preceded by: Manuel Tovar Rivera
- Succeeded by: Alexander Mora Delgado

Permanent Representative to the Central American Bank for Economic Integration
- In office 8 May 2018 – 6 July 2021
- President: Carlos Alvarado Quesada
- Preceded by: Office established
- Succeeded by: Eduardo Trejos Lalli

Deputy of the Legislative Assembly of Costa Rica
- In office 1 May 2014 – 30 April 2018
- Preceded by: Antonio Calderón Castro
- Succeeded by: Ricardo Benavides Jiménez
- Constituency: San José (1st Office)
- In office 1 May 1994 – 30 April 1998
- Preceded by: Daniel Aguilar González
- Succeeded by: Jorge Sánchez Sibaja
- Constituency: San José (18th Office)

President of the Citizens' Action Party
- In office 3 December 2000 – 12 February 2005
- Preceded by: Party established
- Succeeded by: Epsy Campbell Barr

Minister of National Planning and Economic Policy
- In office 8 May 1986 – 1988
- President: Óscar Arias Sánchez
- Preceded by: Juan Manuel Villasuso
- Succeeded by: Jorge Monge Agüero

Personal details
- Born: Ottón Solís Fallas; 31 May 1954 (age 72) San Isidro de El General, Costa Rica
- Party: Citizens' Action Party (since 2000)
- Other political affiliations: National Liberation Party (1978–2000)
- Spouse: Shirley Sánchez Mora (m. 1994)
- Children: 3
- Education: University of Costa Rica (BA); University of Manchester (MA)

Ottón Solís Fallas (born 31 May 1954) is a Costa Rican economist and politician. He was a founding member of the Citizens' Action Party (PAC for its Spanish initials) and ran as its three-time presidential candidate.

He graduated with a Bachelor of Economics from the University of Costa Rica in 1976 and gained a master's degree in economics from the University of Manchester in 1978. He is currently serving his second term as congressman. As an academic, he has taught at several universities in the United States and Costa Rica.

== Early political career ==
Solís was the national economics minister during the Óscar Arias administration, acting in this capacity between 1986 and 1988. He also served as Arias' director of political planning. He was elected as a lawmaker to the Costa Rican Legislative Assembly of Costa Rica from 1994 to 1998, serving with the National Liberation Party, the party he would abandon shortly thereafter.

== Founding the Citizens' Action Party ==
In 2000, Solís, along with several other prominent PLN members, left the party to found PAC. They claimed that PLN's neoliberalism and corruption were reasons to break with the party. Solís was the first president of PAC and a three-time presidential candidate. Since then, Solís has insisted that PAC exists for the sole purpose of fiscal and economic reform.

In 2006, Solís led PAC against the Central American Free Trade Agreement (CAFTA), which became a rallying cry for the party.

In addition to opposing corruption and neoliberalism, one of the founding aims of PAC was to create a more open party system. The party's primaries are open. The party survived several internal ideological battles, adding prominent former Social Christian Unity Party (PUSC for its Spanish initials) members during the 2010 presidential campaign. For his part, Solís said he welcomed a changing ideology and new members.

== Presidential campaigns ==
In the 2002 Costa Rican presidential elections broke the prevailing bipartisan political model with 26% of the popular vote to occupy a strong third place in the presidential race, behind PLN and PUSC.

A virtual tie between former president Óscar Arias and Solís forced a recount in the 2006 presidential election. Ultimately, Arias won, though by only a few thousand votes over the 40% threshold required to avoid a runoff in an election marked by voter absenteeism. The Citizens' Action party won 17 of the 57 seats in the Chamber of Deputies, the national legislature, becoming the second most powerful political party in Costa Rica, ousting PUSC from its traditional position. In the general election of 2010, Solís' PAC received only approximately 25% of the total vote, while his rival, Laura Chinchilla, the PLN's candidate, obtained 47% of the vote turnover. Solís' third attempt to reach the presidency of Costa Rica, and he said he would not run again.

== Temporary leave from politics ==
On 8 February 2011 Solís announced that he was abandoning politics for good, expressing his desire to create spaces for new emerging leaders with his party. Solis stated that he was not planning to become the PAC's presidential candidate again. This decision reflected, in his opinion, his party’s commitment to remain fresh.

Solís returned to politics two years later after serving as an Eminent Scholar at the University of Florida and in several other academic posts. He ran with PAC and won a seat for deputy in 2014.

== Political and economic philosophy ==
=== Anti-neoliberalism ===
Solís asserts that his party, PAC, is not guided by any ideology. In an interview, he stated, "We, at PAC, have not been interested in adopting an ideology. There are proposals that can be considered as coming from the center-right, such as the efficiency of the state, sound fiscal and monetary policies, the conviction that work is what takes to get people out of poverty. But there are other views that can be perceived as socialist, such as our conviction that access to such things as health, education, electricity, telecommunications, culture, technology, and sport, cannot be left to the market forces; universal access criteria must prevail in those cases." How you can call that? I don't know, but if God commands to say something then I'd say that our ideology is human rights and citizens' action."

Solís has outspokenly criticized neoliberalism in Latin America that he associates with the policies advocated by the Washington Consensus, which in his view are wrong, and have led Latin America countries towards the wrong path.

=== Anti-CAFTA stance ===
Solís is a critic of the Central American Free Trade Agreement (CAFTA). He has called for the renegotiations of CAFTA to add protection for vulnerable farmers and industrial companies. He has said that, in its current form, "CAFTA will increase poverty in Central America because it will displace farmers and industrial workers and will increase the cost of health care." He also said, "I never imagined CAFTA was going to be so one sided" and "The law of the jungle benefits the big beast. We are a very small beast." Solís sees several possible detrimental aspects that could come from CAFTA. First, he claims that it will cause the breakup of public telecommunications and electricity monopolies, which will have to be privatized. Additionally, he argues that lowered trade barriers will cause a flood of cheap food products from the United States, which will force small-scale farmers out of the internal market.
