= Alberto Salom Echeverría =

Costa Rican politician (born 1952)

Municipal councillor, San José, Costa Rica
- In office 1978–1982

Deputy
- In office 2006–2010

Rector National University of Costa Rica
- Incumbent
- Assumed office 2015

Personal details
- Born: June 10, 1956 (age 69) San José, Costa Rica
- Party: Citizens' Action Party
- Other political affiliations: formerly Democratic Force, Costa Rican Socialist Party
- Profession: Academic and political organizer

Alberto Salom Echeverría (born June 10, 1952 in San José, Costa Rica) is a Costa Rican politician. He was a deputy with the Citizens' Action Party from 2006 to 2010 and was the former councillor of San José. He is currently Rector of the National University of Costa Rica.

== Biography ==
Salom studied at the Buenaventura Corrales School from 1958 to 1964 and later at Saint Francis High School from 1965 to 1969. He graduated with a Bachelor's in political science and a doctorate in Government and Public Policy from the University of Costa Rica.

Salom's political career began in his teenage years when he was elected President of the Student Council in 1969. At UCR, he was elected President of the Federation of Students from 1974 to 1975. During this time, he led several student protests. A leftist, Salom was a founder of the Costa Rican Socialist Party and the People's United Coalition. He was elected governor of San José from 1978 to 1982 as a member of People's United.

In 1987, he became an adviser to Javier Solís of the Social Christian Unity Party. Later, with Isaac Felipe Azofeifa and other left-leaning politicians, Salom helped found the Democratic Force party, which held three deputy seats in the 1990s. In 2002, Salom became one of the founding members of PAC.

Salom began leading a group of informal PAC meetings, called the "ungroup." Salom, along with María Eugenia Venegas and Ottón Solís encouraged Luis Guillermo Solís to run for President, which he did in 2014.

== Positions ==
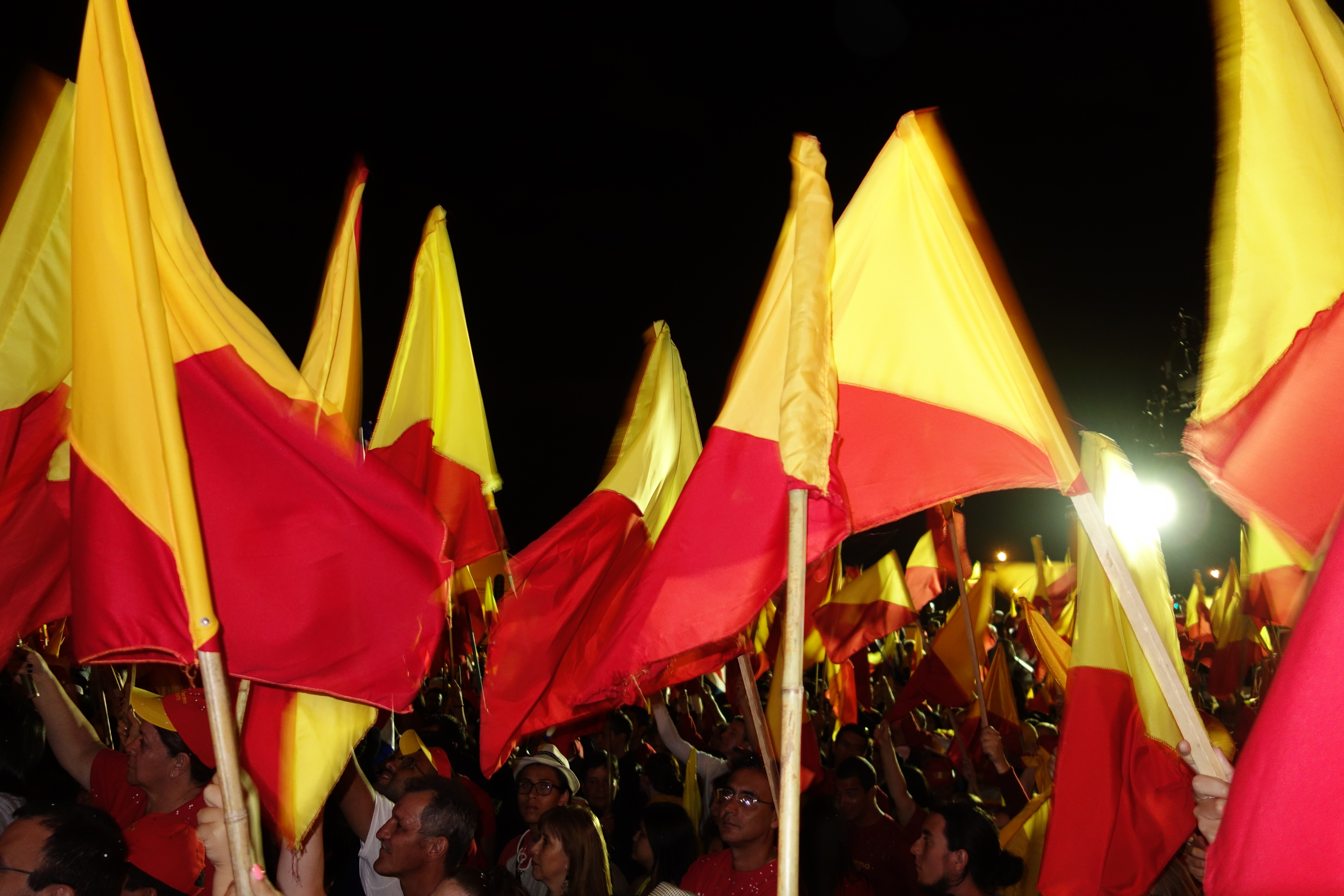
Salom's involvement with PAC helped lead to a presidential victory in 2014

- President, Student Government, Saint Francis High School, (1969).
- President, Federation of Students, University of Costa Rica, (1974–1975).
- Founding member and political commissioner, Costa Rican Socialist Party, (1971–1989)
- Founding member and political board member of People's United Coalition (1977–1990).
- Municipal Governor, San José for People's United Coalition, (1978–1982).
- Founding member of Democratic Force
- Campaign Chief, Citizens' Action Party, 2006
- Professor, National University of Costa Rica, since 1976
- Director, Institute of Work Studies, University of Costa Rica, (1993–1995).
- Vice-rector of Student Life, University of Costa Rica (1995–2000).
- Consultant, United Nations, PRODERE (Población Desplazada, Refugiada y Repatriada), (1991).
- Rector of the National University of Costa Rica (2014-today)
