= Óscar Arias =

President of Costa Rica (1986–1990, 2006–2010)

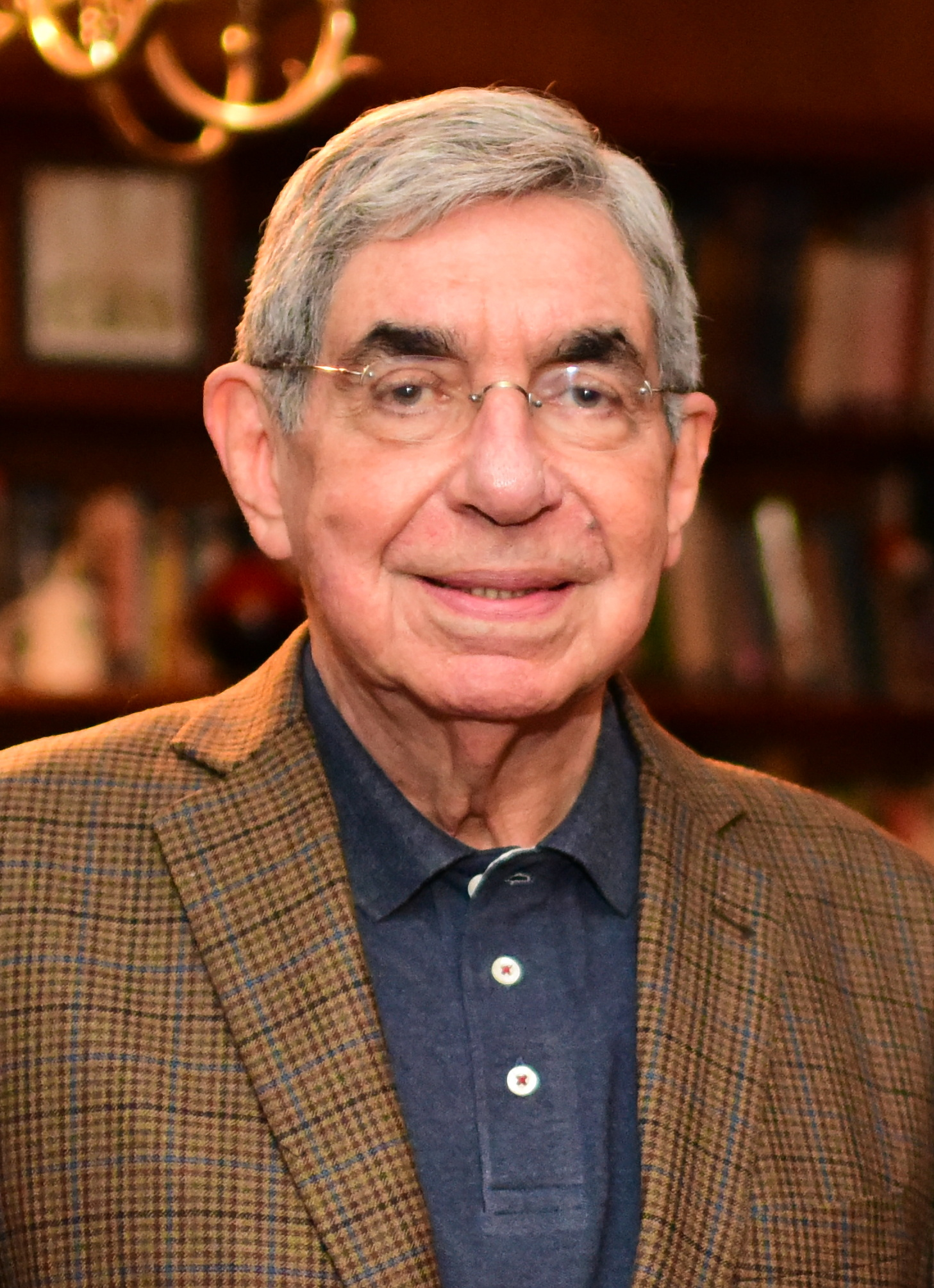
- Arias in 2018

40th & 45th President of Costa Rica
- In office 8 May 2006 – 8 May 2010
- Vice President: Laura Chinchilla; Kevin Casas Zamora
- Preceded by: Abel Pacheco
- Succeeded by: Laura Chinchilla
- In office 8 May 1986 – 8 May 1990
- Vice President: Jorge Manuel Dengo Obregón; Victoria Garrón de Doryan
- Preceded by: Luis Alberto Monge
- Succeeded by: Rafael Ángel Calderón

Deputy of the Legislative Assembly of Costa Rica
- In office 1 May 1978 – 2 May 1981
- Preceded by: Jorge Luis Arce
- Succeeded by: Gerardo Vega
- Constituency: Heredia (2nd office)

Minister of National Planning
- In office May 1974 – July 1977
- President: Daniel Oduber
- Preceded by: Himself
- Succeeded by: Fernando Zumbado

Director of the Office of National Planning
- In office 1971–1974
- President: José Figueres
- Preceded by: Marco López
- Succeeded by: Himself

Personal details
- Born: Óscar Arias Sánchez; 13 September 1940 (age 86) Heredia, Costa Rica
- Party: National Liberation Party
- Spouse: Margarita Penón Góngora (m. 1973; div. 1993) Suzanne Fischel Kopper (m. 2012)
- Children: 2
- Education: Boston University; University of Costa Rica; London School of Economics; University of Essex
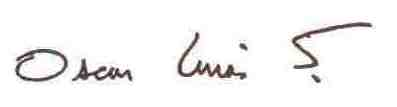
- Signature

Óscar Arias Sánchez (Spanish pronunciation: [ˈoskaɾ ˈaɾjas]; born 13 September 1940) is a Costa Rican politician, activist and Nobel Peace Prize laureate who was the president of Costa Rica from 1986 to 1990 and from 2006 to 2010.

Arias was awarded the Nobel Peace Prize in 1987 for his proposal of a negotiated solution to the Central American crisis. He sought the support of the Contadora group for his plan, which involved the removal of all foreign powers from the region, an end to aid for antigovernment guerrillas in El Salvador and Nicaragua, and the implementation of democratic principles and a compromise peace for social reconstruction. Although his plan was not officially adopted, its key concepts were later reflected in the settlements in El Salvador (1990–93) and Nicaragua (1989–90).

He was also a recipient of the Albert Schweitzer Prize for Humanitarianism and a trustee of Economists for Peace and Security. In 2003, he was elected to the board of directors of the International Criminal Court's Trust Fund for Victims.

== Early life and education ==
Arias was born into an upper-class family in the province of Heredia, whose ancestors included Ana Cardoso, an enslaved woman from Cartago. Arias concluded his secondary schooling at the Saint Francis College in the capital city of San José. He then went to the United States and enrolled in Boston University with the intention of studying medicine, but he soon returned to his home country and completed degrees in law and economics at the University of Costa Rica. In 1967, Arias traveled to the United Kingdom and enrolled in the London School of Economics. He received a doctoral degree in political science from the University of Essex in 1974.

== First presidency (1986–1990) ==
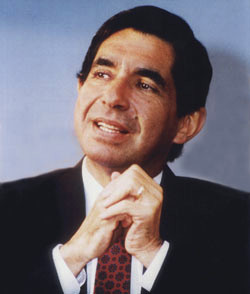
Arias in the 1980s

Arias joined the National Liberation Party (PLN), Costa Rica's main social democratic party. In 1986 he ran successfully for president on that party's ticket. Arias's presidency saw the transformation of Costa Rica's economy from one based on the traditional cash crops (coffee and bananas) to one more focused on non-traditional agriculture (e.g., of exotic flowers and fruits) and tourism. Some within the PLN criticized his administration for abandoning the party's social democratic teachings and promoting a neoliberal economic model. He is now often regarded as a neoliberal although he is a member of a nominally social democratic party.

Arias received the 1987 Nobel Peace Prize with the help of John Biehl, his peer in England, and Rodrigo Madrigal Nieto for his work towards the signing of the Esquipulas II Accords. This was a plan intended to promote democracy and peace on the Central American isthmus during a time of great turmoil: leftist guerrillas were fighting against the governments in El Salvador and Guatemala, which were backed by the United States under the auspices of the Cold War; the Contras, supported by the United States, were fighting an insurgency against the Sandinista in Nicaragua; Honduras, only recently wresting political power from its military, was caught in the middle as a base for U.S. military forces; and on Costa Rica's other border, Panama faced the oppression of Manuel Noriega's military dictatorship. With the support of Arias, the various armed conflicts ended within the decade (Guatemala's civil war finally ended in 1996).

Arias then called for a higher level of integration in the Central America region and promoted the creation of the Central American Parliament (Parlamento Centroamericano). During his current administration, Arias has declared that Costa Rica will not enter the Central American Parliament. Arias also modified the country's educational system. The most notable action in this respect was the reintroduction of standardized academic tests at the end of primary and secondary school.

== Between presidencies (1990–2006) ==
The Costa Rican constitution had been amended in 1969 to include a clause forbidding former presidents to seek re-election. Arias challenged this at the Sala IV, the Constitutional Chamber of the Supreme Court of Justice of Costa Rica, which initially rejected his application in September 2000. In 2003, a group of Arias supporters presented an unconstitutionality challenge against the 1969 constitutional amendment forbidding re-election, and this time the ruling in April 2003 struck down the prohibition against non-consecutive re-election. This decision was denounced as a "state blow" or "coup d'état" by ex-president Luis Alberto Monge.

Arias announced in 2004 that he intended to run again for president in the February 2006 general elections. By then, he was the only living former president who was not either in jail, under indictment or facing an investigation. Though for years private polling companies and several news media published polls predicting Arias would win by a wide margin, the election was initially deemed too close to call. A month later, on 7 March, after a manual recount, the official results showed Arias beat center-left contender Ottón Solís by 18,169 votes (1.2% of valid votes cast), and finished just a few thousand votes over the 40 percent threshold required to capture the presidency in a single round. He took the oath of office at noon on 8 May 2006 at the National Stadium.

== Second presidency (2006–2010) ==
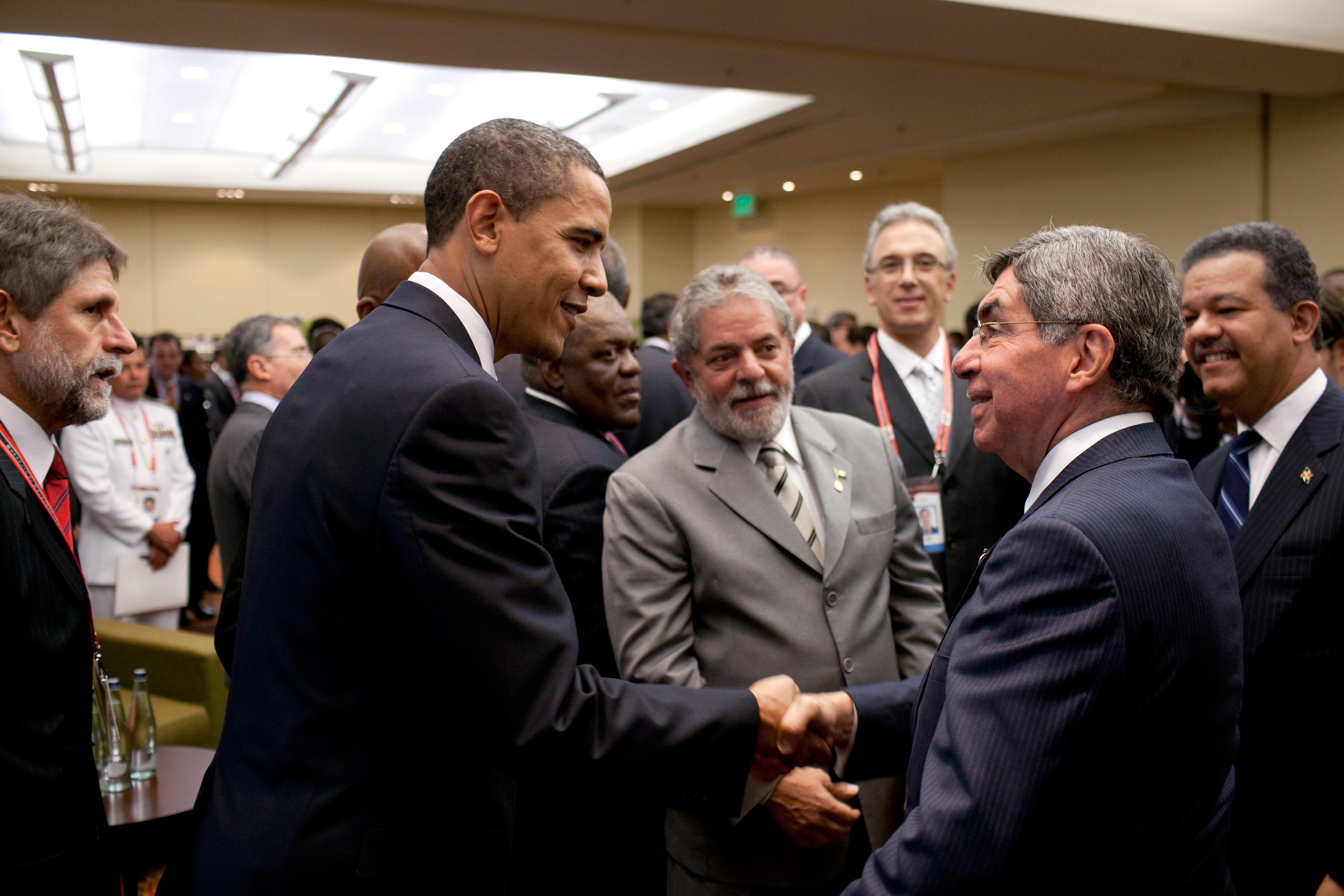
Arias with Barack Obama on 17 April 2009

On 1 June 2007, he switched Costa Rica's diplomatic recognition from the Republic of China (Taiwan) to the People's Republic of China, making Costa Rica the 167th nation in the world to do so. Subsequently, under diplomatic and financial pressure from Beijing, he induced the Dalai Lama, a fellow Nobel Peace Prize laureate, to postpone indefinitely a proposed and much anticipated visit during Beijing's suppression of controversial riots in Tibet.

In his speech on 15 September 2008, he admitted that he was tired because of the criticism of his opponents.

At the 5th Summit of the Americas in Trinidad and Tobago, on 18 April 2009, Arias gave a speech on the topic "We've been doing something wrong". Directed at fellow Latin American leaders, he decried Latin America's lack of development compared to other parts of the world, calling for pragmatism, and more resources directed at education rather than militaries.

=== Mediator in 2009 Honduran constitutional crisis ===
In 2009, the Supreme Court of Honduras issued an arrest warrant for Honduran President Manuel Zelaya because of violations of the constitution and laws. Two days later, the National Congress of Honduras (in which Zelaya's own party held 62 out of 128 seats, more than any other party), also voted to dismiss Zelaya. Zelaya fled to Costa Rica. The Honduran constitution mandated that the head of Congress, Roberto Micheletti, who was next in the presidential line of succession, becomes the provisional head of state since Vice President Elvin Ernesto Santos had resigned in December 2008 to run for president. Micheletti's term ended 27 January 2010.

Arias began serving as mediator between Zelaya and Micheletti in the 2009 Honduran constitutional crisis. Representatives of the two Hondurans met with Arias on various occasions but so far have failed to reach any kind of agreement. As described above (with factual citations), Arias himself was initially prohibited by Costa Rica's constitutional court from another term, due to constitutional term limits, but this was reversed using legal means, with the consent of the Costa Rican Sala IV court, unlike in Honduras. New elections in Honduras are planned for 29 November 2009. Micheletti's government stated on 2 July 2009 that it is willing to hold this year's presidential election early. Arias presented a seven-point agreement, which calls for the return of Zelaya as president – a condition deemed unacceptable to the interim government. Zelaya's representatives accepted the Arias proposal "in principle" but Micheletti's representatives balked at the key point of Zelaya returning to power in Honduras.

== Post-presidency (2010–present) ==
In 2025, Arias's US visa was revoked by the US State Department, which Arias blamed for his seeking better relations with China when he was president. In a Facebook post published in February, he remarked that Donald Trump acted like "a Roman emperor, dictating to the rest of the world what to do".

At a news conference in San José, Arias stated that he had received a brief email from the U.S. government. The message referenced Section 221(i) of the Immigration and Nationality Act, which grants the secretary of state and consular officers the authority to revoke visas at their discretion.

== Health ==
In August 2007, Arias was affected by tendinitis, and in April 2008 he canceled some activities because of muscular pain in his lumbar region. Subsequently, due to increasing difficulty in speaking over the course of several weeks, Arias went to the Philadelphia Ears, Nose and Throat Associates medical center in the United States on 20 May 2008, where it was determined that he had a nonmalignant cyst on his vocal cords. As a result, it was announced on 21 May that doctors advised him not to speak for one month, saying that if this did not help, surgery would be considered. On 11 August 2009 Arias was diagnosed with H1N1 Influenza, but he recovered.

== Incidents and concerns ==
- In 2004, in response to a rival candidate (Antonio Álvarez) for his party's nomination challenging him to a debate, Oscar Arias said: "Eagles live in high places, and make a serious mistake if they go down to the mud to fight with snails."
- In 2010, during the closing weeks of his second term, he inaugurated various unachieved projects with ribbon-cutting and bronze plaque ceremonies:
  - The new National Stadium, despite that it was only about 75% finished.
  - The new presidential offices despite the fact that these offices do not exist yet. The land is still for sale and the Legislative Assembly has allocated no funds yet in order to buy it, let alone build anything on the vacant lot.
  - The new Juan Santamaría International Airport installation, despite the fact the project was only 82% completed.

== Judicial accusations ==
In 2017 Costa Rica's General Attorney office indicted Arias for the Crucitas case, a case in which former Environment Minister Roberto Dobles and Arias as president signed a 2008 decree ceding the Canadian company Infinito Gold control over a protected area near the Nicaraguan border known as Crucitas for gold mining and declaring it "national interest", something that the Prosecution argued was illegal as protected areas cannot be granted for exploitation of any kind. Dobles was previously found guilty of the charges, but Arias was not indicted alongside him by the previous General Attorney Jorge Chavarría (often accused of being close to Arias). The new General Attorney Emilia Navas reopened the case indicting Arias.

Also in 2019 psychiatrist and anti-Nuclear activist Alexandra Arce von Herold formally accused Arias of rape at the Public Ministry. Following her allegation three more women came to light accusing Arias of sexual harassment and misconduct. Arias denied the charges. In December 2020, all sexual harassment charges against Arias were dismissed.

=== Definitive acquittal and dismissal ===
After more than a year of investigations, and in the absence of evidence, the cases were dismissed by the prosecution. Due to the request of the two complainants, requiring, therefore, the revocation of the instance and subsequent dismissal. The definitive dismissal was ordered by Judge Natalia Rodríguez Solís, of the Pavas Criminal Court.

Regarding the "Crucitas" case, in October 2019 the former president was completely released from the case, according to a judicial resolution.

== Recognitions and awards ==
Arias has received over fifty honorary degrees, including doctorates from Harvard University, Princeton University, Dartmouth College, Oberlin College, Wake Forest University, Ithaca College and Washington University in St. Louis.

Among the main awards received are:

- Premio de la Paz Martin Luther King Jr.
- Medalla de la Libertad de Filadelfia.
- Premio Jackson Ralston
- Premio Principe de Asturias
- Premio Humanitario Albert Schweitzer.
- Premio de las Américas.

== Publications ==
=== Books ===
- 1970 Grupos de presión en Costa Rica
- 1976 Quién gobierna en Costa Rica
- 1977 Democracia, independencia y sociedad latinoamericana
- 1978 Los caminos para el desarrollo de Costa Rica
- 1979 Nuevos rumbos para el desarrollo costarricense
- 1984 ¿Quien gobierna en Costa Rica?
- 1984 Nuevos rumbos para el desarrollo costarricense
- 1985 Democracia, independencia y sociedad latinoamericana
- 1989 El camino de la paz
- 1990 Horizontes de Paz
- 1990 La semilla de la paz
- 1994 Nuevas dimensiones de la educación
- 2005 Hagamos juntos el camino (Discursos, artículos y ensayos)
- 2007 Sigamos Avanzando
- 2012 Con velas, timón y brújula
- 2023 The Power of ideas
- 2024 Pages of my memory

=== Articles ===
Former President Arias has written several opinion articles during his career, which have been published in different journalistic media:

- Por amor a la política
- Carta de Oscar Arias sobre flujo de armas a Nicaragua
- A 30 años de la firma del Plan de Paz
- To stem the child migrant crisis, first stop poverty and violence
- Lo humanamente correcto
- Consejo a los jóvenes de mi país
- Mi opinión sobre el proceso de negociación de la paz en Colombia
- «The memory of a rare success»
- Y ladrillo a ladrillo, fuimos construyendo la paz
- Es vital para el país aprobar la reforma fiscal

Government offices
Preceded by Marco López	Director of the Office of National Planning; 1971–1974	Office abolished
Political offices
New office	Minister of National Planning; 1974–1977	Succeeded by Fernando Zumbado
Preceded by Luis Alberto Monge	President of Costa Rica; 1986–1990	Succeeded by Rafael Ángel Calderón Fournier
Preceded by Abel Pacheco	President of Costa Rica; 2006–2010	Succeeded by Laura Chinchilla
Assembly seats
Preceded by Jorge Luis Arce	Deputy of the Legislative Assembly of Costa Rica for Heredia's 2nd Office; 1978–1981	Succeeded by Gerardo Vega
Party political offices
Preceded by Luis Alberto Monge	PLN nominee for President of Costa Rica; 1986	Succeeded by Carlos Manuel Castillo
Preceded by Rolando Araya Monge	PLN nominee for President of Costa Rica; 2006	Succeeded by Laura Chinchilla
