= Carlos Alvarado =

President of Costa Rica from 2018 to 2022

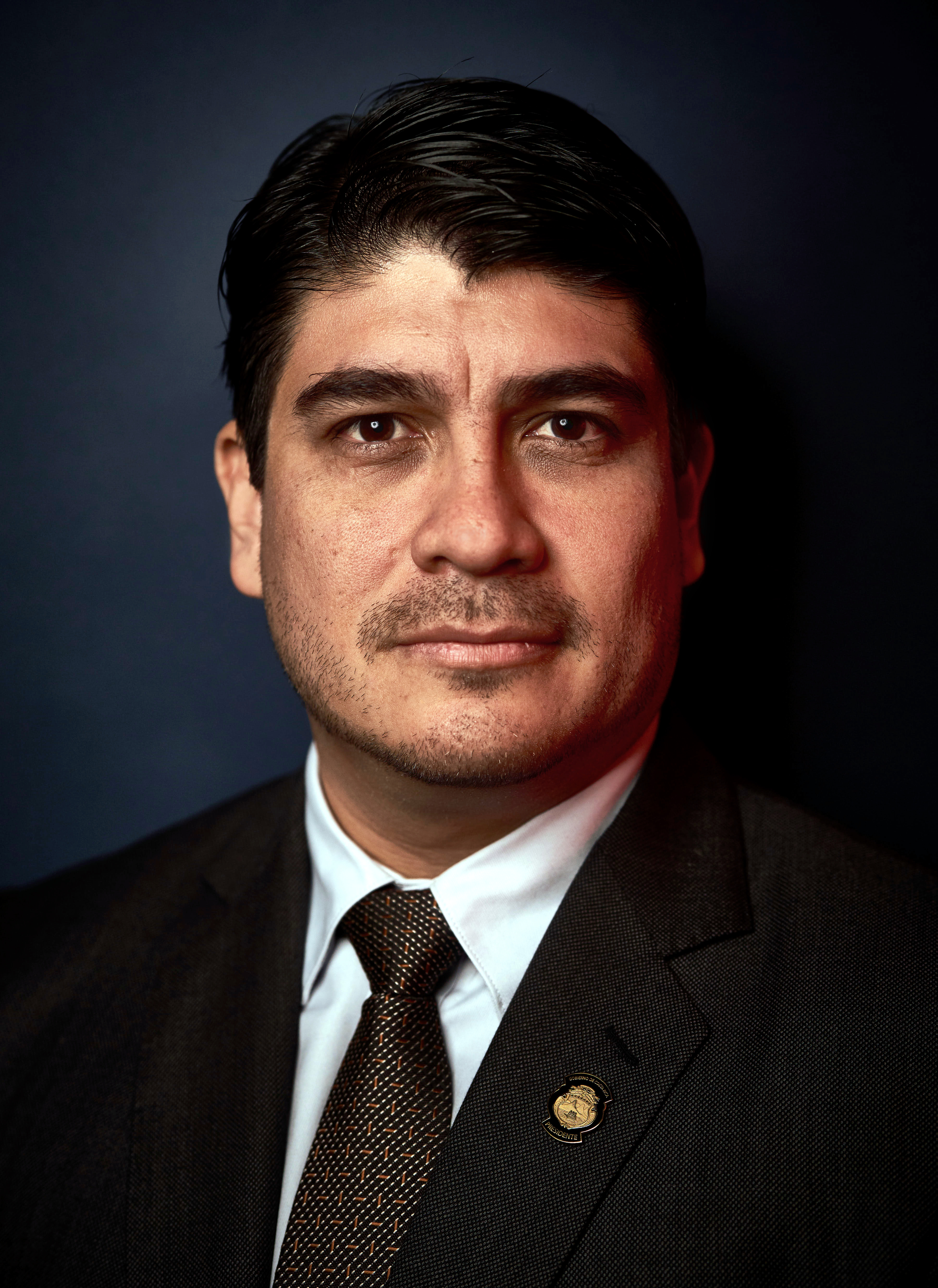
- Official portrait, 2019

48th President of Costa Rica
- In office 8 May 2018 – 8 May 2022
- Vice President: First Vice President Epsy Campbell Barr; Second Vice President Marvin Rodríguez
- Preceded by: Luis Guillermo Solís
- Succeeded by: Rodrigo Chaves
Ministerial offices
Minister of Labor and Social Security
In office 28 March 2016 – 19 January 2017
President	Luis Guillermo Solís
Preceded by	Víctor Morales Mora
Succeeded by	Alfredo Hasbum Camacho
Minister of Human Development and Social Inclusion
In office 10 July 2014 – 29 March 2016
President	Luis Guillermo Solís
Preceded by	Fernando Marín Rojas
Succeeded by	Emilio Arias Rodríguez

Personal details
- Born: Carlos Andrés Alvarado Quesada; 14 January 1980 (age 46) San José, Costa Rica
- Party: Citizens' Action Party
- Spouse: Claudia Dobles Camargo (m. 2010)
- Children: 1
- Education: University of Costa Rica (BA, MA); University of Sussex (MA)

Carlos Andrés Alvarado Quesada (Spanish pronunciation: [ˈkaɾlos alβaˈɾaðo keˈsaða]; born 14 January 1980) is a Costa Rican politician, writer, journalist, and political scientist who served as the 48th president of Costa Rica from 8 May 2018 to 8 May 2022. A member of the Citizens' Action Party (PAC), he previously served as Minister of Labor and Social Security under President Luis Guillermo Solís.

Alvarado, who was 38 years old at the time of his presidential inauguration, became the youngest serving Costa Rican president since Alfredo González Flores, who took office in 1914 at the age of 36.

== Early life and education ==
Alvarado was born into a middle-class family in the Pavas District, San José canton in central Costa Rica, on 14 January 1980. His father, Alejandro Alvarado Induni, was an engineer, and his mother, Adelia Quesada Alvarado, was a homemaker. He has an older brother named Federico and a younger sister named Irene.

Alvarado holds a bachelor's degree in Keneth Arias Medina School and a master's degree in political science from the University of Costa Rica. He was a Chevening Scholar from 2008 to 2009, earning a master's degree in development studies from the Institute of Development Studies at the University of Sussex in Falmer, England.

== Literary career ==
In 2006, Alvarado Quesada published the anthology of stories Transcriptions Infields with Pero Azul. That same year, he obtained the Young Creation Award of Editorial Costa Rica with the novel La Historia de Cornelius Brown. In 2012, he published the historical novel Las Possessions, which portrays the dark period in Costa Rican history when the government confiscated the properties of Germans and Italians during World War II.

== Early political career ==
He served as an advisor to the Citizen Action Party's group in the Legislative Assembly of Costa Rica in the 2006-2010 period. He was a consultant to the Institute of Development Studies of the United Kingdom in financing SMEs (small and medium-sized enterprises), Department Manager of Dish Care & Air Care (Procter & Gamble Latin America), Director of Communication for the presidential campaign of Luis Guillermo Solís, professor in the School of Sciences of Collective Communication of the University of Costa Rica and the School of Journalism Of the Universidad Latina de Costa Rica. During the Solís Rivera administration, he served as Minister of Human Development and Social Inclusion and Executive President of the Joint Social Welfare Institute, the institution charged with combating poverty and giving state aid to the population with scarce resources. After the resignation of Víctor Morales Mora as minister, Alvarado was appointed minister of Labor.

== Presidency (2018–2022) ==
On 1 April 2018, Alvarado won the presidential election (second round) with 61%, defeating Fabricio Alvarado Muñoz. Same-sex marriage was a major issue in the electoral campaign, after a ruling by the Inter-American Court of Human Rights required Costa Rica to recognize such unions. Alvarado Muñoz campaigned against same-sex marriage, while Alvarado argued to respect the court's ruling. He was sworn into office on 8 May 2018.

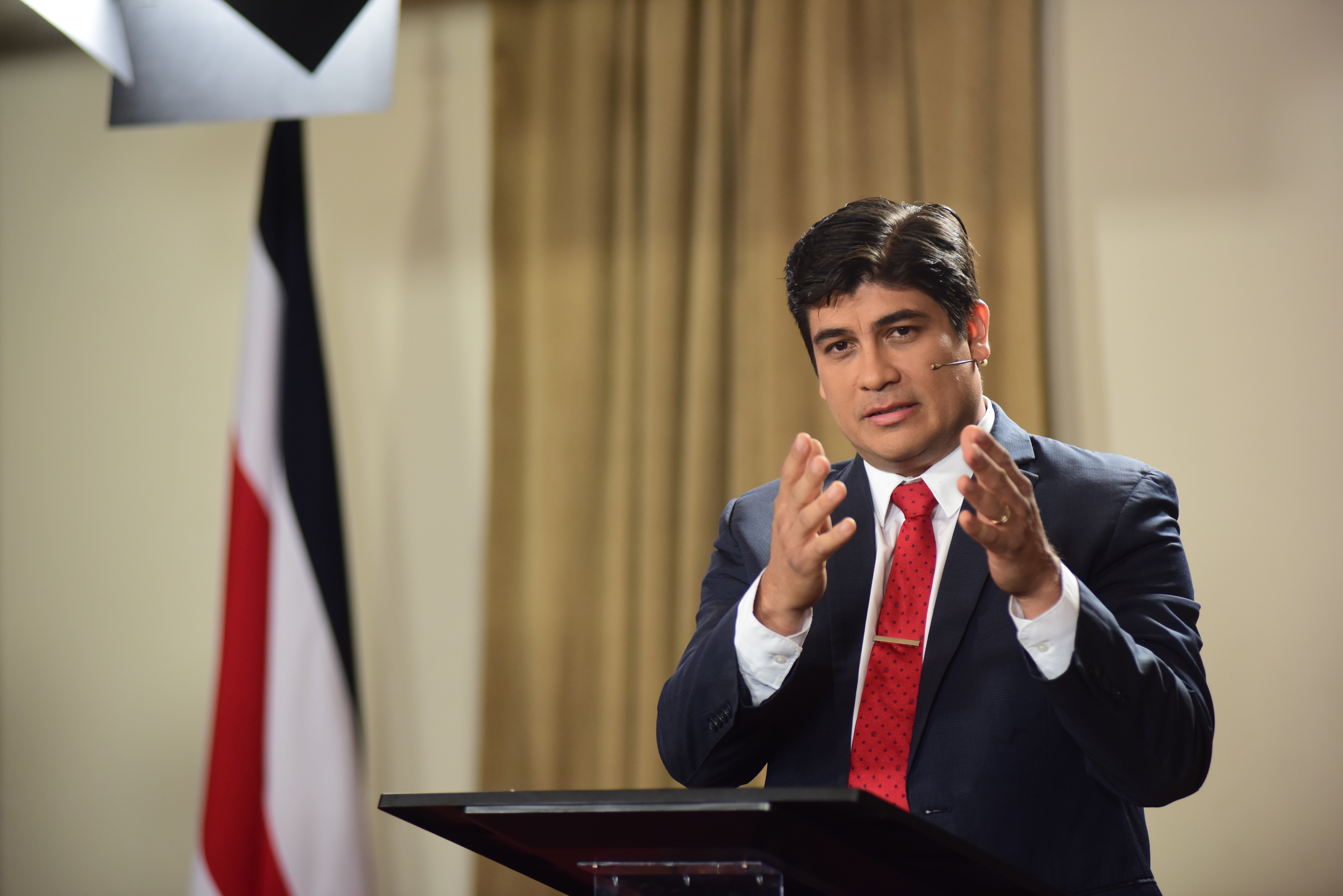
Alvarado speaking in 2018

As president, Carlos Alvarado Quesada focused on decarbonizing Costa Rica's economy. He set a goal for the country to achieve zero net emissions by the year 2050. He planned to build an electric rail-based public transit system for the capital, San José since 40% of the country's greenhouse gas emissions come from transportation. On 24 February 2019, he launched a plan to fully decarbonize the country's economy, in a ceremony alongside Christiana Figueres, the Costa Rican former UNFCCC head. At this event, he described decarbonization as "the great challenge of our generation," and declared that "Costa Rica must be among the first countries to achieve it, if not the first."

In December 2018, he pushed through a law that raised taxes and reduced public sector salaries, which he justified due to the country's poor economic situation. His actions resulted in the largest general strike in twenty years.

During the COVID-19 pandemic, he decided to maintain a neoliberal economic policy with high social costs. The government has thus cut public spending, especially in the education budget. Unemployment has risen from 8.1% in 2017 to 14.4% by the end of 2021, 23% of the population lives below the poverty line and the public debt has reached 70% of GDP, one of the highest rates in Latin America. While this policy was supported in Congress by the National Liberation Party (PNL) and the Social Christian Unity Party (PUSC), the two main traditional parties, it has caused the government to lose the support of civil servants, academics, the left, and a large part of the middle class. According to ECLAC, Costa Rica is expected to be the Latin American country, along with Brazil, that will have the most difficulty in reviving its economy after the pandemic.

The country's political life has been marked by corruption cases, both in government and in opposition parties, which have contributed to the discrediting of the political class among a part of the population. Ministers, former ministers, and mayors have been implicated in corruption cases involving embezzlement and bribery for multi-million dollar public works contracts. In 2021, six mayors, including the mayor of the capital San José, were arrested. Some cases even revealed the penetration of political circles by drug trafficking groups.

During his time in office, Alvarado was invited to speak on topics of sustainability, energy, and climate change mitigation by organizations such as Chatham House, Atlantic Council, and DC Dialogues (moderated by Columbia University professor and CNN en Español columnist Geovanny Vicente).

At the end of Alvarado's presidential term, he had a twelve percent approval rating. His successor, Rodrigo Chaves Robles, assumed office on 8 May 2022.

== Post-presidency (2022–present) ==
After his presidency, Alvarado continued to serve as a keynote speaker for events at institutions such as Harvard University, the Inter-American Investment and Nature Forum (IABNF), organized by the Inter-American Institute of Justice and Sustainability (IIJS), where he shared the stage with international leaders like Claudia S. de Windt, among others.

Currently, he is a professor at the Graduate School of Global Affairs at Tufts University in Massachusetts, United States.

== Personal life ==
Alvarado met his future wife, Claudia Dobles Camargo, while riding the school bus they both used to take to elementary school. He is a Catholic.

Political offices
Preceded by Fernando Marín Rojas	Human Development and Social Inclusion; 2014–2016	Succeeded by Emilio Arias Rodríguez
Preceded by Víctor Morales Mora	Minister of Labor and Social Security; 2016–2017	Succeeded by Alfredo Hasbum Camacho
Preceded by Luis Guillermo Solís	President of Costa Rica; 2018–2022	Succeeded by Rodrigo Chaves Robles
Party political offices
Preceded by Luis Guillermo Solís	Leader of the Citizens' Action Party; 2018–present	Incumbent
Preceded by Luis Guillermo Solís	PAC nominee for President of Costa Rica; 2018	Succeeded by Welmer Ramos González
