= Costa Rica at the 2025 World Aquatics Championships =

- Flag of Costa Rica
- World Aquatics code: CRC
- National federation: Federación Costarricense de Deportes Acuáticos
- Website: fecodacrc.org

in Singapore
- Competitors: 10 in 3 sports
- Medals: Gold 0 Silver 0 Bronze 0 Total 0

World Aquatics Championships appearances
- 1973; 1975; 1978; 1982; 1986; 1991; 1994; 1998; 2001; 2003; 2005; 2007; 2009; 2011; 2013; 2015; 2017; 2019; 2022; 2023; 2024; 2025

Costa Rica is competing at the 2025 World Aquatics Championships in Singapore from 11 July to 3 August 2025.

== Competitors ==
The following is the list of competitors in the Championships.

| Sport | Men | Women | Total |
|---|---|---|---|
| Artistic swimming | 0 | 8 | 8 |
| Open water swimming | 1 | 0 | 1 |
| Swimming | 1 | 0 | 1 |
| Total | 2 | 8 | 10 |

== Artistic swimming ==
Women

| Athlete | Event | Preliminary | | Final | |
| Athlete | Event | Points | Rank | Points | Rank |
|---|---|---|---|---|---|
| Maria Paula Alfaro | Solo technical | 187.1917 | 29 | Did not advance | |
| Maria Paula Alfaro | Solo free | 128.0950 | 28 | Did not advance | |
| Maria Paula Alfaro; Anna Mitinian | Duet technical | 200.0366 | 34 | Did not advance | |
| Maria Paula Alfaro; Anna Mitinian | Duet free | 135.2216 | 34 | Did not advance | |

Mixed

| Athlete | Event | Preliminary | | Final | |
| Athlete | Event | Points | Rank | Points | Rank |
|---|---|---|---|---|---|
| Maria Paula Alfaro; Valeria Alfaro; Amanda Arias Mora; Maria Paz Castro; Mariangel Gonzalez; Anna Mitinian; Jimena Solano; Raquel Zuniga | Team acrobatic | 102.0533 | 25 | Did not advance | |
| Maria Paula Alfaro; Valeria Alfaro; Amanda Arias Mora; Maria Paz Castro; Mariangel Gonzalez; Anna Mitinian; Jimena Solano; Raquel Zuniga | Team free | 141.5545 | 18 | Did not advance | |

== Open water swimming ==
Men

| Athlete | Event | Heat | | Semifinal | | Final | |
| Athlete | Event | Time | Rank | Time | Rank | Time | Rank |
|---|---|---|---|---|---|---|---|
| Jeison Rojas | 3 km knockout sprints | 18:53.30 | =25 | Did not advance | | | |
| Jeison Rojas | 5 km | — | | | | 1:02:54.00 | 51 |
| Jeison Rojas | 10 km | — | | | | 2:12:42.90 | 49 |

== Swimming ==
Men

| Athlete | Event | Heat | | Semifinal | | Final | |
| Athlete | Event | Time | Rank | Time | Rank | Time | Rank |
|---|---|---|---|---|---|---|---|
| Alberto Vega | 200 m freestyle | 1:55.87 | 49 | Did not advance | | | |
| Alberto Vega | 400 m freestyle | 4:06.17 | 40 | — | | Did not advance | |
