= Costa Rica at the 2017 World Aquatics Championships =

- Flag of Costa Rica
- FINA code: CRC
- National federation: Federación Costarricense de Natación
- Website: www.fecona.co.cr

in Budapest, Hungary
- Competitors: 16 in 3 sports
- Medals: Gold 0 Silver 0 Bronze 0 Total 0

World Aquatics Championships appearances
- 1973; 1975; 1978; 1982; 1986; 1991; 1994; 1998; 2001; 2003; 2005; 2007; 2009; 2011; 2013; 2015; 2017; 2019; 2022; 2023; 2024

Costa Rica is scheduled to compete at the 2017 World Aquatics Championships in Budapest, Hungary from 14 July to 30 July.

== Open water swimming ==
Costa Rica has entered two open water swimmers

Athlete	Event	Time	Rank
Cristofer Lanuza	Men's 5 km	1:06:01.6	61
Cristofer Lanuza	Men's 10 km	2:15:41.2	65
Raquel Duran	Women's 5 km	1:11:34.8	56
Raquel Duran	Women's 10 km	OTL	

== Swimming ==
Costa Rica has received a Universality invitation from FINA to send a maximum of four swimmers (two men and two women) to the World Championships.

Athlete	Event	Heat		Semifinal		Final	
Athlete	Event	Time	Rank	Time	Rank	Time	Rank
Bryan Alvarez	Men's 50 m butterfly	25.06	47	did not advance			
Bryan Alvarez	Men's 100 m butterfly	55.85	59	did not advance			
Arnoldo Herrera	Men's 100 m breaststroke	1:05.61	60	did not advance			
Arnoldo Herrera	Men's 200 m breaststroke	2:24.57	37	did not advance			
Marie Laura Meza	Women's 50 m butterfly	27.97 NR	38	did not advance			
Marie Laura Meza	Women's 100 m butterfly	1:01.25	31	did not advance			
Helena Moreno	Women's 200 m freestyle	2:03.58	32	did not advance			
Helena Moreno	Women's 400 m freestyle	4:19.27	25	—		did not advance	
Helena Moreno	Women's 800 m freestyle	8:56.43	28	—		did not advance	

== Synchronized swimming ==
Costa Rica's synchronized swimming team consisted of 10 athletes (10 female).

Women

Athlete	Event	Preliminaries		Final	
Athlete	Event	Points	Rank	Points	Rank
Natalia Jenkins	Solo technical routine	67.2832	28	did not advance	
Bianca Benavides	Solo free routine	67.3333	31	did not advance	
Fiorella Calvo; Natalia Jenkins	Duet technical routine	69.2287	35	did not advance	
Fiorella Calvo; Natalia Jenkins	Duet free routine	70.5667	38	did not advance	
Bianca Benavides; Fiorella Calvo; Hara Calvo; Valera Condega; Ambar Garcia (R); Natalia Jenkins; Valeria Lizano; Andrea Maroto (R); Elda Moreira; Mariana Solis	Team technical routine	65.2021	24	did not advance	
Bianca Benavides; Fiorella Calvo; Hara Calvo; Valera Condega; Ambar Garcia (R); Natalia Jenkins; Valeria Lizano; Andrea Maroto (R); Elda Moreira; Mariana Solis	Team free routine	66.9000	24	did not advance	

Legend: (R) = Reserve Athlete
