= Costa Rica at the 2015 World Aquatics Championships =

- Flag of Costa Rica
- World Aquatics code: CRC
- National federation: Federación Costarricense de Natación
- Website: www.fecona.co.cr

in Kazan, Russia
- Competitors: 16 in 3 sports
- Medals: Gold 0 Silver 0 Bronze 0 Total 0

World Aquatics Championships appearances
- 1973; 1975; 1978; 1982; 1986; 1991; 1994; 1998; 2001; 2003; 2005; 2007; 2009; 2011; 2013; 2015; 2017; 2019; 2022; 2023; 2024; 2025

Costa Rica competed at the 2015 World Aquatics Championships in Kazan, Russia from 24 July to 9 August 2015.

== Open water swimming ==
Two swimmers from Costa Rica qualified to compete in the open water marathon.

Athlete	Event	Time	Rank
Cristofer Lanuza	Men's 5 km	1:02:49.1	44
Cristofer Lanuza	Men's 10 km	2:12:23.3	65
Angélica Astorga	Women's 5 km	1:09:19.7	36
Angélica Astorga	Women's 10 km	2:20:39.4	49

== Swimming ==
Costa Rican swimmers have achieved qualifying standards in the following events (up to a maximum of 2 swimmers in each event at the A-standard entry time, and 1 at the B-standard):

Men

Athlete	Event	Heat		Semifinal		Final	
Athlete	Event	Time	Rank	Time	Rank	Time	Rank
Esteban Araya	200 m individual medley	2:08.89	41	did not advance			
Esteban Araya	400 m individual medley	4:40.23	41	—N/a		did not advance	
Mario Montoya	100 m freestyle	52.06	71	did not advance			
Mario Montoya	200 m freestyle	1:52.92	60	did not advance			

Women

Athlete	Event	Heat		Semifinal		Final	
Athlete	Event	Time	Rank	Time	Rank	Time	Rank
Marie Laura Meza	100 m butterfly	1:01.59	41	did not advance			
Helena Moreno	400 m freestyle	4:26.87	40	—N/a		did not advance	
Helena Moreno	800 m freestyle	9:09.27	36	—N/a		did not advance	

Mixed

Athlete	Event	Heat		Final	
Athlete	Event	Time	Rank	Time	Rank
Marie Laura Meza; Esteban Araya; Helena Moreno; Mario Montoya	4×100 m freestyle relay	3:46.16	19	did not advance	
Mario Montoya; Esteban Araya; Marie Laura Meza; Helena Moreno	4×100 m medley relay	4:10.75	17	did not advance	

== Synchronized swimming ==
Costa Rica fielded a full team of ten synchronized swimmers to compete in each of the following events.

Athlete	Event	Preliminaries		Final	
Athlete	Event	Points	Rank	Points	Rank
Fiorella Calvo; Natalia Jenkins	Duet technical routine	68.2496	35	did not advance	
Fiorella Calvo; Natalia Jenkins	Duet free routine	68.5667	34	did not advance	
Johanna Akerman; Bianca Benavides; Carolina Bolanos*; Fiorella Calvo; Mariela Jenkins; Natalia Jenkins; Valeria Lizano; Violeta Mitinian; Elda Moreira; Karina Sanchéz*	Team technical routine	67.3454	23	did not advance	
Johanna Akerman; Bianca Benavides; Carolina Bolanos*; Fiorella Calvo; Mariela Jenkins; Natalia Jenkins; Valeria Lizano; Violeta Mitinian; Elda Moreira; Karina Sanchéz*	Team free routine	71.8000	19	did not advance	
