= Montealegre =

Montealegre is a surname. Notable people with the surname include:

- Eduardo Montealegre (born 1955), Nicaraguan politician
- Felicia Montealegre Bernstein (1922–1978), Costa Rica-born American actress, wife of Leonard Bernstein
- Francisco Montealegre Fernández (1818–1875), Costa Rican politician and businessman
- Gerónima Montealegre (1823–1892), First Lady of Costa Rica in 1870
- Gloria Montealegre, American journalist
- José María Montealegre (1815–1887), President of Costa Rica from 1859 to 1863
- Katerine Montealegre (born 1992), Chilean lawyer
- Mariano Montealegre Bustamante (1783–1843), Costa Rican diplomat and politician
- Reynaldo Aguado Montealegre (born 1960), Nicaraguan human rights activist
- Rox Montealegre (born 1990), Filipina actress
- Piero Coen Montealegre (1942-2025) Nicaraguan Businessman.
- Mariano Montealegre y Romero (1802-1884) Nicaraguan Politician.
- Franco Montealegre Callejas (born 1952) Director General & First Commissioner of the National Police of Nicaragua.
- Angelica Balladares Montealegre (1872-1973) Nicaraguan Political Figure & Philanthropist.
- General Francisco Parajón Montealegre (died 1961) Prominent Liberal Nicaraguan Commander and Politician.
- Margarita Montealegre (born 1956) First female war photojournalist in Nicaragua.

== See also ==
- Montealegre, Galicia, Spain
- Montealegre, León, Spain
- Montealegre de Campos, Spain
- Montealegre del Castillo, Spain
