= Costa Rica at the 2013 World Aquatics Championships =

- Flag of Costa Rica
- FINA code: CRC
- National federation: Federación Costarricense de Natación
- Website: www.fecona.co.cr

in Barcelona, Spain
- Competitors: 18 in 3 sports
- Medals: Gold 0 Silver 0 Bronze 0 Total 0

World Aquatics Championships appearances
- 1973; 1975; 1978; 1982; 1986; 1991; 1994; 1998; 2001; 2003; 2005; 2007; 2009; 2011; 2013; 2015; 2017; 2019; 2022; 2023; 2024

Costa Rica is competed at the 2013 World Aquatics Championships in Barcelona, Spain between July 20 and August 4, 2013.

== Open water swimming ==
The following swimmers from Costa Rica qualified for the open water marathon.

Athlete	Event	Time	Rank
Francisco Montero	Men's 5 km	57:19.4	42
Francisco Montero	Men's 10 km	2:03:27.6	55
Rodolfo Sanchez	Men's 5 km	59.48.1	44
Rodolfo Sanchez	Men's 10 km	2:06:50.7	58

== Swimming ==
Costa Rican swimmers earned qualifying standards in the following events (up to a maximum of 2 swimmers in each event at the A-standard entry time, and 1 at the B-standard):

Men

Athlete	Event	Heat		Semifinal		Final	
Athlete	Event	Time	Rank	Time	Rank	Time	Rank
José Montoya	100 m freestyle	53.48	63	did not advance			
José Montoya	100 m breaststroke	1:05.89	57	did not advance			

Women

Athlete	Event	Heat		Semifinal		Final	
Athlete	Event	Time	Rank	Time	Rank	Time	Rank
Natalia Gómez	50 m breaststroke	35.49	60	did not advance			
Natalia Gómez	100 m breaststroke	1:16.96	52	did not advance			
Marie Meza	50 m butterfly	28.43	40	did not advance			
Marie Meza	100 m butterfly	1:03.63	38	did not advance			

== Synchronised swimming ==
Costa Rica has qualified twelve synchronized swimmers.

Athlete	Event	Preliminaries		Final	
Athlete	Event	Points	Rank	Points	Rank
Violeta Mitinian	Solo free routine	70.160	29	did not advance	
Violeta Mitinian	Solo technical routine	71.300	28	did not advance	
Bianca Benavides; Violeta Mitinian	Duet free routine	67.230	33	did not advance	
Bianca Benavides; Violeta Mitinian	Duet technical routine	66.300	30	did not advance	
Johanna Akerman; Carolina Bolanos; Fiorella Calvo; Mariela Jenkins; Natalia Jenkins; Valeria Lizano; Elda Moreira; Silvia Quiros; Bianca Benavides*	Team free routine	62.190	17	did not advance	
Bianca Benavides; Carolina Bolanos; Fiorella Calvo; Mariela Jenkins; Natalia Jenkins; Valeria Lizano; Elda Moreira; Silvia Quiros	Team technical routine	63.400	16	did not advance	
