= Costa Rica at the 2022 World Aquatics Championships =

- Flag of Costa Rica
- FINA code: CRC
- National federation: Costa Rican Swimming Federation

in Budapest, Hungary
- Competitors: 14 in 3 sports
- Medals: Gold 0 Silver 0 Bronze 0 Total 0

World Aquatics Championships appearances
- 1973; 1975; 1978; 1982; 1986; 1991; 1994; 1998; 2001; 2003; 2005; 2007; 2009; 2011; 2013; 2015; 2017; 2019; 2022; 2023; 2024

Costa Rica competed at the 2022 World Aquatics Championships in Budapest, Hungary from 18 June to 3 July.

== Artistic swimming ==
Costa Rica entered 10 artistic swimmers.

Women

Athlete	Event	Preliminaries		Final	
Athlete	Event	Points	Rank	Points	Rank
Maria Alfaro	Solo technical routine	61.4452	26	did not advance	
Anna Mitinian	Solo free routine	66.2000	26	did not advance	
Maria Alfaro; Anna Mitinian	Duet technical routine	63.6299	32	did not advance	
Andrea Maroto; Raquel Zúñiga	Duet free routine	66.4000	31	did not advance	
Maria Alfaro; Mariela Jenkins; Jimena Lizano; Andrea Maroto; Anna Mitinian; Elda Moreira; Jimena Solano; Raquel Zúñiga	Team technical routine	64.7922	18	did not advance	
Maria Alfaro; María Paz Castro; Mariela Jenkins; Jimena Lizano; Andrea Maroto; Anna Mitinian; Elda Moreira; Ilani Rocha; Jimena Solano; Raquel Zúñiga	Highlight routine	65.7667	15	did not advance	

== Open water swimming ==
Costa Rica entered 2 open water swimmers (1 men and 1 women)

Men

Athlete	Event	Time	Rank
Jeison Rojas	5 km	59:45.4	43
Jeison Rojas	10 km	2:05:01.4	49

Women

Athlete	Event	Time	Rank
Diana Quirós	5 km	OTL	
Diana Quirós	10 km	DNF	

== Swimming ==
Costa Rica entered 2 swimmers.

Men

Athlete	Event	Heat		Semifinal		Final	
Athlete	Event	Time	Rank	Time	Rank	Time	Rank
Arnoldo Herrera	50 m breaststroke	30.14	50	did not advance			
Arnoldo Herrera	200 m breaststroke	2:24.46	38	did not advance			

Women

Athlete	Event	Heat		Semifinal		Final	
Athlete	Event	Time	Rank	Time	Rank	Time	Rank
Alondra Ortíz	200 m butterfly	2:19.01	24	did not advance			
Alondra Ortíz	200 m individual medley	2:23.22	33	did not advance			
