= Costa Rica at the 2023 World Aquatics Championships =

- Flag of Costa Rica
- World Aquatics code: CRC
- National federation: Federación Costarricense de Deportes Acuáticos
- Website: fecodacrc.org

in Fukuoka, Japan
- Competitors: 12 in 3 sports
- Medals: Gold 0 Silver 0 Bronze 0 Total 0

World Aquatics Championships appearances
- 1973; 1975; 1978; 1982; 1986; 1991; 1994; 1998; 2001; 2003; 2005; 2007; 2009; 2011; 2013; 2015; 2017; 2019; 2022; 2023; 2024; 2025

Costa Rica is set to compete at the 2023 World Aquatics Championships in Fukuoka, Japan from 14 to 30 July.

== Artistic swimming ==
Costa Rica entered 8 artistic swimmers.

Women

| Athlete | Event | Preliminaries | | Final | |
| Athlete | Event | Points | Rank | Points | Rank |
|---|---|---|---|---|---|
| María Alfaro | Solo technical routine | 148.2166 | 29 | Did not advance | |
| Anna Mitinian | Solo free routine | 96.0500 | 29 | Did not advance | |
| Andrea Maroto; Raquel Zúñiga | Duet technical routine | 159.2233 | 33 | Did not advance | |
| María Alfaro; Anna Mitinian | Duet free routine | 99.5604 | 35 | Did not advance | |

Mixed

| Athlete | Event | Preliminaries | | Final | |
| Athlete | Event | Points | Rank | Points | Rank |
|---|---|---|---|---|---|
| Jimena Solano; Anna Mitinian; Raquel Zúñiga; María Alfaro; Mariela Jenkins; Andrea Maroto; Alexa Alpízar; María Paz Castro | Team technical routine | 162.0811 | 20 | Did not advance | |
| Jimena Solano; Anna Mitinian; Raquel Zúñiga; María Alfaro; Mariela Jenkins; Andrea Maroto; Alexa Alpízar; María Paz Castro | Team free routine | 134.3000 | 18 | Did not advance | |

== Open water swimming ==
Costa Rica entered 2 open water swimmers.

Men

| Athlete | Event | Time | Rank |
|---|---|---|---|
| Jeison Rojas | Men's 5 km | 1:01:28.3 | 53 |
| Jeison Rojas | Men's 10 km | 2:04:33.1 | 50 |

Women

| Athlete | Event | Time | Rank |
|---|---|---|---|
| Kisha Jiménez | Women's 5 km | OTL | |
| Kisha Jiménez | Women's 10 km | OTL | |

== Swimming ==
Costa Rica entered 2 swimmers.

Men

| Athlete | Event | Heat | | Semifinal | | Final | |
| Athlete | Event | Time | Rank | Time | Rank | Time | Rank |
|---|---|---|---|---|---|---|---|
| Alberto Vega | 200 metre freestyle | 1:55.07 | 51 | Did not advance | | | |
| Alberto Vega | 400 metre freestyle | 4:05.18 | 41 | —N/a | | Did not advance | |

Women

| Athlete | Event | Heat | | Semifinal | | Final | |
| Athlete | Event | Time | Rank | Time | Rank | Time | Rank |
|---|---|---|---|---|---|---|---|
| Alondra Ortiz | 200 metre butterfly | 2:16.95 | 27 | Did not advance | | | |
| Alondra Ortiz | 200 metre individual medley | 2:19.91 | 31 | Did not advance | | | |
