= First ladies and gentlemen of Costa Rica =

Spouse of the Costa Rican president

First Gentleman of Costa Rica
- Incumbent; Jeffrey Umaña Avendaño since 8 May 2026
- Inaugural holder: Pacífica Fernández Oreamuno
- Formation: 8 May 1847

First Lady or First Gentleman of Costa Rica (Spanish: Primera dama o Primer caballero de Costa Rica) is the title of the wife or husband of the president of Costa Rica. Traditionally, the president's wife was colloquially known as la presidenta ("the president", with a feminine -a ending). The current term was first used under Federico Alberto Tinoco Granados.

== Operations ==
The Office of First Lady of First Gentleman is allocated no official funding from the government budget of Costa Rica. Instead, the office and officeholder relies on private donations to cover the expenses. These funds support the first lady's causes and foundations, which traditionally focus on cultural, environmental, and social issues. The office of Leila Rodríguez Stahl, the first lady 2002 to 2006, had a staff of approximately 60 at its largest. However, many of those staffers worked pro bono or were employed temporarily from other government offices.

== First ladies and gentlemen of Costa Rica (1847–present) ==
Image	First Lady or Gentleman	Lifespan	President	Years in position	Notes
	Pacífica Fernández Oreamuno	1828–1885	José María Castro Madriz	1847–1849	José María Castro Madriz was the first President of Costa Rica, making Pacífica Fernández the inaugural First Lady.
	Felipa Montes de Oca Gamero	1814–1882	Miguel Mora Porras	1849	
	Inés Aguilar Cueto	1830–1895	Juan Rafael Mora Porras	1849–1859	
	Sofía Matilde Joy Redman	1823–1908	José María Montealegre Fernández	1859–1863	Born in the United Kingdom
	Esmeralda Oreamuno Gutiérrez	1834–1873	Jesús Jiménez Zamora	1863 –1866	
	Pacífica Fernández Oreamuno	1828–1885	José María Castro Madriz	1866–1868	
	Esmeralda Oreamuno Gutiérrez	1834–1873	Jesús Jiménez Zamora	1868–1870	
	Gerónima Montealegre Fernández	1823–1892	Bruno Carranza Ramírez	1870	
	Emilia Solórzano Alfaro	1835–1882	Tomás Guardia Gutiérrez	1870–1876	
	Isaura Carazo Peralta	1838–1905	Aniceto Esquivel Sáenz	1876	
	Guadalupe Gutiérrez García	1828–1886	Vicente Herrera Zeledón	1876–1877	
	Emilia Solórzano Alfaro	1835–1914	Tomás Guardia Gutiérrez	1877–1882	
	Angélica Guardia Solórzano	1858–1938	Saturnino Lizano Gutiérrez	1882	
	Cristina Guardia Gutiérrez	1842–1907	Próspero Fernández Oreamuno	1882–1885	
	Pacífica Fernández Guardia	1864–1919	Bernardo Soto Alfaro	1885–1890	
	Luisa Alvarado Carrillo	1853–1943	José Rodríguez Zeledón	1890–1894	
	Manuela Rodríguez Alvarado	1872–1953	Rafael Yglesias Castro	1894–1902	
	Adela Salazar Guardia	1869–1907	Ascensión Esquivel Ibarra	1902–1906	
	Adela Herrán Bonilla	1861–1932	Cleto González Víquez	1906–1910	
	Vacant since President Oreamuno was unmarried		Ricardo Jiménez Oreamuno	1910–1914	
	Vacant since President González was unmarried		Alfredo González Flores	1914–1917	
	María Fernández Le Cappellain	1877–1961	Federico Tinoco Granados	1917–1919	
	Clementina Quirós Quirós	1875–1965	Juan Bautista Quirós Segura	1919	
	Natalia Morúa Ortíz		Francisco Aguilar Barquero	1919–1920	
	Elena Gallegos Rosales	1882–1954	Julio Acosta García	1920–1924	Born in El Salvador
	Vacant since President Oreamuno was unmarried		Ricardo Jiménez Oreamuno	1924–1928	
	Adela Herrán Bonilla	1861–1932	Cleto González Víquez	1928–1932	Died in 1932 while President González was still in office
	Beatriz Zamora López	1871–1933	Ricardo Jiménez Oreamuno	1932–1933	Beatriz Zamora López died in office in 1933. There was no First Lady until 1936
	María Eugenia Calvo Badia	1914–1983	Ricardo Jiménez Oreamuno	1936	Second wife of President Oreamuno
	Julia Fernández Rodríguez	1882–1957	León Cortés Castro	1936–1940	
	Yvonne Clays Spoelders	1906–1994	Rafael Ángel Calderón Guardia	1940–1944	Born in Belgium. First woman to serve as a Costa Rican diplomat.
	Etelvina Ramírez Montiel	1901–1976	Teodoro Picado Michalski	1944–1948	
	Henrietta Boggs	1918–2020	José Figueres Ferrer	1948–1949	Born in the United States. Boggs and Figueres divorced on January 1, 1954
	Vacant since President Ulate was unmarried		Otilio Ulate Blanco	1949–1953	President Ulate never married, though he was in a long-term relationship with Haydée Rojas Smith for many years.
	Karen Olsen Beck	1930–2025	José Figueres Ferrer	1954–1958	Born in Denmark. Olsen married President Figueres in office on February 7, 1954, becoming First Lady.
	Olga De Benedictis Antonelli	1916–2001	Mario Echandi Jiménez	1958–1962	Daughter of Italian parents
	Marita Camacho Quirós	1911–2025	Francisco José Orlich Bolmarcich	1962–1966	Became a supercentenarian in 2021.
	Clara Fonseca Guardia	1916–2002	José Joaquín Trejos Fernández	1966–1970	
	Karen Olsen Beck	1930–2025	José Figueres Ferrer	1970–1974	Born in Denmark
	Marjorie Elliott Sypher	1925–2015	Daniel Oduber Quirós	1974–1978	Born in Canada
	Estrella Zeledón Lizano	1929–2019	Rodrigo Carazo Odio	1978–1982	
	Doris Yankelewitz Berger	1934–2016	Luis Alberto Monge Álvarez	1982–1986	Costa Rica's first Jewish First Lady
	Margarita Penón Góngora	1948–	Óscar Arias Sánchez	1986–1990	
	Gloria Bejarano Almada	1952–	Rafael Ángel Calderón Fournier	1990–1994	Born in Mexico
	Josette Altmann Borbón	1958–	José María Figueres Olsen	1994–1998	
	Lorena Clare Facio	1943–2026	Miguel Ángel Rodríguez Echeverría	1998–2002	
	Leila Rodríguez Stahl	1942–	Abel Pacheco de la Espriella	2002–2006	Rodriguez won the Miss Costa Rica pageant in 1960
	Vacant since President Arias was divorced at the time		Óscar Arias	2006–2010	
	José María Rico	1934–2019	Laura Chinchilla Miranda	2010–2014	Born in Spain. 1st First Gentleman of Costa Rica
	Mercedes Peñas Domingo	1968–	Luis Guillermo Solís Rivera	2014–2018	Born in Spain
	Claudia Dobles Camargo	1980–	Carlos Alvarado Quesada	2018–2022	
	Signe Zeikate	1972–	Rodrigo Chaves Robles	2022–2026	Born in Latvia
	Jeffrey Umaña Avendaño	1986–	Laura Fernández Delgado	2026–Present	
