= Costa Rica at the 2024 World Aquatics Championships =

- Flag of Costa Rica
- FINA code: CRC
- National federation: Federación Costarricense de Deportes Acuáticos
- Website: fecodacrc.org

in Doha, Qatar
- Competitors: 12 in 3 sports
- Medals: Gold 0 Silver 0 Bronze 0 Total 0

World Aquatics Championships appearances
- 1973; 1975; 1978; 1982; 1986; 1991; 1994; 1998; 2001; 2003; 2005; 2007; 2009; 2011; 2013; 2015; 2017; 2019; 2022; 2023; 2024

Costa Rica competed at the 2024 World Aquatics Championships in Doha, Qatar from 2 to 18 February.

== Competitors ==
The following is the list of competitors in the Championships.

Sport	Men	Women	Total
Artistic swimming	0	8	8
Open water swimming	1	0	1
Swimming	2	1	3
Total	3	9	12

== Artistic swimming ==
Women

Athlete	Event	Preliminaries		Final	
Athlete	Event	Points	Rank	Points	Rank
María Alfaro	Solo technical routine	167.3550	24	Did not advance	
Anna Mitinian	Solo free routine	115.0938	28	Did not advance	
Andrea Maroto; Raquel Zúñiga	Duet technical routine	176.7768	34	Did not advance	
María Alfaro; Anna Mitinian	Duet free routine	118.6812	32	Did not advance	

Mixed

Athlete	Event	Preliminaries		Final	
Athlete	Event	Points	Rank	Points	Rank
María Alfaro; Alexa Alpízar; María Paz Castro; Nadia Gómez; Andrea Maroto; Anna Mitinian; Jimena Solano; Raquel Zúñiga	Team technical routine	147.7479	16	Did not advance	
María Alfaro; Alexa Alpízar; María Paz Castro; Nadia Gómez; Andrea Maroto; Anna Mitinian; Jimena Solano; Raquel Zúñiga	Team free routine	Did not start		Did not advance	

== Open water swimming ==
Men

Athlete	Event	Time	Rank
Jeison Rojas	5 km	55:32.2	53
Jeison Rojas	10 km	2:00:09.6	64

== Swimming ==
Costa Rica entered 3 swimmers.

Men

Athlete	Event	Heat		Semifinal		Final	
Athlete	Event	Time	Rank	Time	Rank	Time	Rank
Guido Montero	50 metre backstroke	27.71	38	Did not advance			
Guido Montero	100 metre backstroke	58.88	45	Did not advance			
Alberto Vega	400 metre freestyle	4:06.89	46	—		Did not advance	
Alberto Vega	800 metre freestyle	8:30.93	39	—		Did not advance	

Women

Athlete	Event	Heat		Semifinal		Final	
Athlete	Event	Time	Rank	Time	Rank	Time	Rank
Beatriz Padrón	100 metre freestyle	57.56	32	Did not advance			
Beatriz Padrón	200 metre freestyle	2:04.39	34	Did not advance			
