= Rebeca Grynspan =

Costa Rican economist and diplomat (born 1955)

- Grynspan in 2025

8th Secretary-General of UN Trade and Development
- Incumbent
- Assumed office September 13, 2021; On leave: April 1, 2026 – present (Note: Pedro Manuel Moreno serves as acting secretary general.)
- Preceded by: Mukhisa Kituyi

Secretary-General of the Ibero-American General Secretariat
- In office April 1, 2014 – September 10, 2021
- Preceded by: Enrique Iglesias
- Succeeded by: Andrés Allamand

Associate Administrator of the United Nations Development Programme
- In office February 1, 2010 – April 1, 2014
- Preceded by: Ad Melkert
- Succeeded by: Maria Eugenia Casar

Second Vice President of Costa Rica
- In office May 8, 1994 – May 8, 1998
- President: José María Figueres
- Preceded by: Arnoldo López Echandi
- Succeeded by: Elizabeth Odio Benito

Personal details
- Born: December 14, 1955 (age 70) San José, Costa Rica
- Party: National Liberation Party
- Spouse: Saúl Weisleder (m. 1978)
- Children: 2
- Education: University of Costa Rica (BA); University of Sussex (MA)

Rebeca Grynspan Mayufis (Note: In this name that follows Hispanic American naming customs, the first or paternal surname is Grynspan and the second or maternal family name is Mayufis.) (born December 14, 1955) is a Costa Rican economist and diplomat who has served as Secretary-General of the United Nations Conference on Trade and Development (UNCTAD) since 2021, the first woman to hold that post. She previously served as Secretary-General of the Ibero-American General Secretariat from 2014 to 2021 and as Second Vice President of Costa Rica from 1994 to 1998, in addition to holding several cabinet and United Nations Development Programme (UNDP) posts.

A member of Costa Rica's National Liberation Party, Grynspan built her early career in domestic finance and social policy before moving into multilateral diplomacy, where she has held senior roles at the UNDP, the Economic Commission for Latin America and the Caribbean, and the Ibero-American General Secretariat. As head of UNCTAD, she helped broker the Black Sea Grain Initiative during the Russian invasion of Ukraine and led the agency's 2024 rebranding as "UN Trade and Development". In October 2025, the government of Costa Rica nominated Grynspan as its candidate in the 2026 selection process to succeed António Guterres as UN Secretary-General.

== Early life and education ==
Grynspan was born in San José on December 14, 1955, to a Costa Rican Jewish family. Her parents, Manuel Grynspan Burstin and Sara Mayufis Schapiro, emigrated from Poland to Central America; her maternal grandparents were killed during the Holocaust, and she has a sister who lives in Israel.

She earned a bachelor's degree in economics from the University of Costa Rica and a master's degree in economics from the University of Sussex in England. After graduating, she worked as a professor and researcher at the Economic Science Research Institute of the University of Costa Rica.

In 1978 she married Saúl Weisleder, a fellow economist who later served as a deputy and president of Costa Rica's Legislative Assembly (1994–1998) and as Costa Rica's alternate permanent representative to the United Nations. The couple have two children.

== Career ==
=== National politics ===
A member of the National Liberation Party, Grynspan served as vice-minister of finance from 1986 to 1988 during the presidency of Óscar Arias. She was Second Vice President of Costa Rica from 1994 to 1998 under José María Figueres, serving concurrently as coordinating minister for the social sector (1994–1998), coordinating minister for the economic sector (1995–1996), and minister of housing and human settlements (1996–1998).

=== International roles ===
Grynspan was director of the Mexico City office of the Economic Commission for Latin America and the Caribbean (ECLAC) from 2001 to 2006, where she co-chaired the executive board of the International Food Policy Research Institute. During this period she was a member of both the United Nations Millennium Project's task force on poverty and economic development and the UN high-level panel on financing for development. She served as Assistant Secretary-General and Regional Director for Latin America and the Caribbean at the United Nations Development Programme (UNDP) from 2006 to 2010, and in February 2010 she was appointed by Secretary-General Ban Ki-moon as UN Under-Secretary-General and Associate Administrator of UNDP, under Administrator Helen Clark. While in that role she also represented the UN Secretary-General on the United Nations Commission for the Reconstruction of Haiti, formed after the 2010 earthquake.

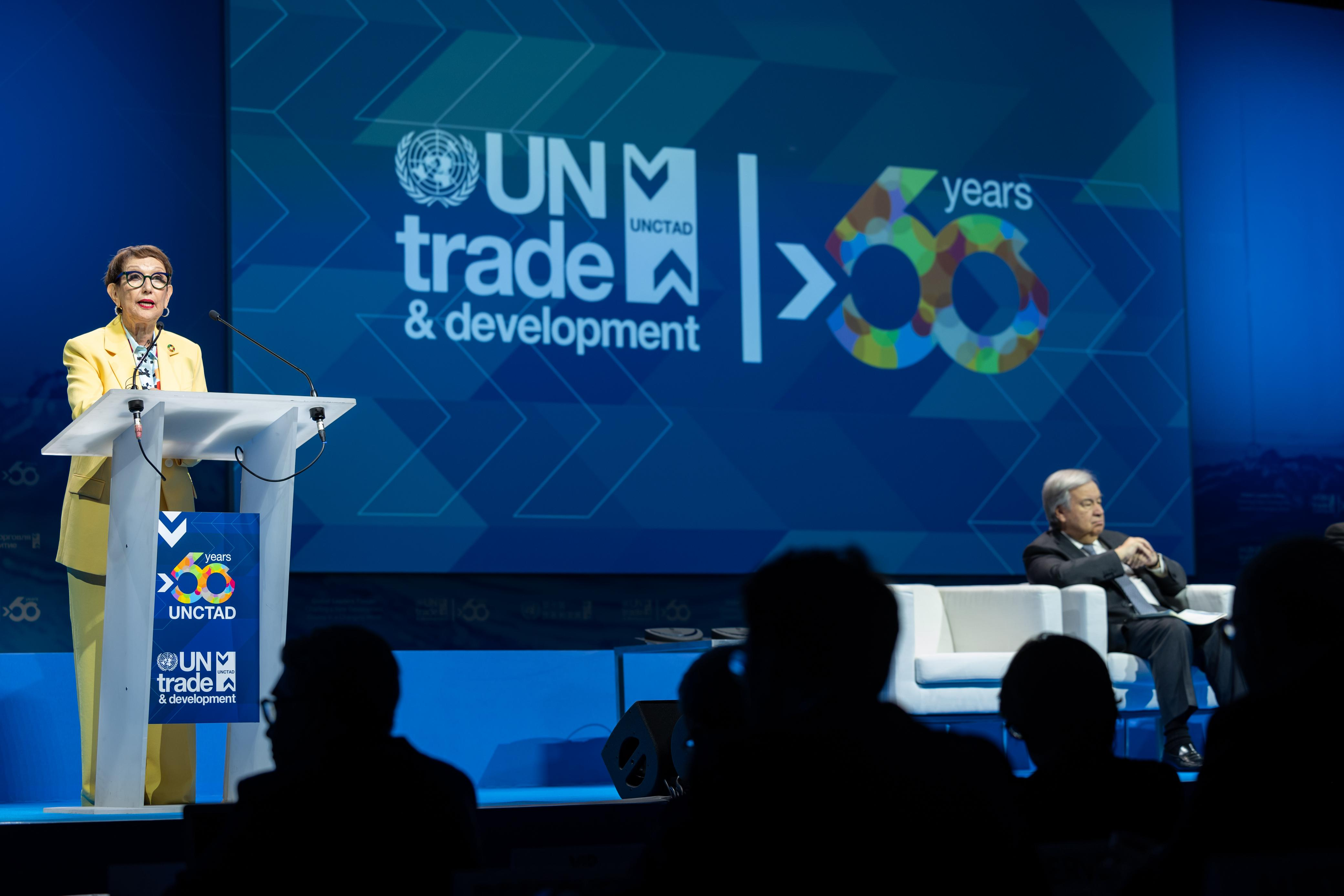
Grynspan with António Guterres at a 2024 UNCTAD meeting

Grynspan was elected unopposed as Secretary-General of the Ibero-American General Secretariat (SEGIB) at a special meeting of foreign ministers in Mexico City on February 24, 2014, becoming the first woman to hold the post; she took office on April 1, 2014, and was reelected by consensus of the 22 Ibero-American countries in 2018. During her tenure Ban Ki-moon appointed her to the Lead Group of the Scaling Up Nutrition Movement, and in 2021 the G20 named her to a high-level independent panel on financing global commons for pandemic preparedness and response, co-chaired by Ngozi Okonjo-Iweala, Tharman Shanmugaratnam, and Lawrence Summers.

=== Secretary-General of UN Trade and Development ===
In 2021 Guterres appointed Grynspan as the eighth Secretary-General of UNCTAD, effective September 13, 2021, making her the first woman to lead the agency. She oversaw the fifteenth UNCTAD quadrennial conference in Bridgetown, Barbados, in 2021, at which member states adopted a declaration on COVID-19 recovery, vaccine access, trade, debt, and climate finance for developing countries.

Following Russia's full-scale invasion of Ukraine in 2022, Grynspan played a central role in negotiating the Black Sea Grain Initiative between the United Nations, Turkey, Russia, and Ukraine, which allowed more than 32 million tons of grain to be exported safely from Ukrainian ports, helped lower global food prices, and averted worsening food insecurity in import-dependent countries; she also chaired the UN Global Crisis Response Group on food, energy, and finance and represented the UN at G20 summits on the issue. In April 2024, marking UNCTAD's 60th anniversary, she unveiled the agency's first rebranding in six decades, adopting "UN Trade and Development" as its public-facing name to better convey its advocacy role for developing countries in the global economy. She subsequently oversaw the agency's UNCTAD16 conference in 2025 and the 2024 Global Leaders Forum in Geneva marking the anniversary.

She is a member of the Program for the Support of Women's Leadership and Representation at the Inter-American Development Bank and previously served as vice president of the board of directors of the International Food Policy Research Institute in Washington, D.C. In 2021, Argentina's president, Alberto Fernández, designated her an international adviser to the country's Economic and Social Council.

=== Boards and international networks ===
Grynspan sits on the International Labour Organization's Global Commission on the Future of Work and on the World Economic Forum's council on the future of international governance, public–private cooperation, and sustainable development, part of its Network of Global Future Councils. She has co-chaired the Fourth Sector Group's governing council as part of the Fourth Sector Development Initiative, and is a member of the G20's Women 20 (W20) initiative and of the Women Political Leaders Global Forum's global advisory board, initiatives that seek to expand women's presence in leadership roles. She also serves on the boards of the Ibero-American Institute of Securities Markets and of the Carolina Foundation, and is an adviser to The Global Analysis and Trends in Emerging Regions network, based in Madrid and Beijing.

=== Candidate for UN Secretary-General ===
On October 8, 2025, Costa Rican president Rodrigo Chaves formally nominated Grynspan as a candidate in the 2026 selection process for Secretary-General of the United Nations.

== Recognition ==
In 2014 and 2015 Grynspan was recognized as one of the 50 leading intellectuals of Latin America, and Forbes named her among its 50 most influential women in Ibero-America. In 2017 she received a Forbes Excellence Award and was granted the Grand Cross of the Civil Order of Alfonso X The Wise by the Spanish government during the premiership of Mariano Rajoy. In recognition of her professional achievements, the University of Extremadura and the European University conferred honorary doctorates on her, in 2016 and 2018, respectively. In 2026 she received the Maruja Mallo Prize in the Globalization category, awarded by the Ortega-Marañón Foundation in its third edition.

== Notes ==
Political offices
Preceded by Arnoldo López Echandi	Second Vice President of Costa Rica; 1994–1998	Succeeded by Elizabeth Odio Benito
Diplomatic posts
Preceded by Ad Melkert	Associate Administrator of the United Nations Development Programme; 2010–2014	Succeeded by Maria Eugenia Casar
Preceded by Enrique Iglesias	Secretary-General of the Ibero-American General Secretariat; 2014–2021	Succeeded by Andrés Allamand
Preceded by Mukhisa Kituyi	Secretary-General of UN Trade and Development; 2021–present	Incumbent
