= Costa Rica at the 2019 World Aquatics Championships =

- Flag of Costa Rica
- FINA code: CRC
- National federation: Costa Rican Swimming Federation
- Website: fecona.co.cr (in Spanish)

in Gwangju, South Korea
- Competitors: 15 in 3 sports
- Medals: Gold 0 Silver 0 Bronze 0 Total 0

World Aquatics Championships appearances
- 1973; 1975; 1978; 1982; 1986; 1991; 1994; 1998; 2001; 2003; 2005; 2007; 2009; 2011; 2013; 2015; 2017; 2019; 2022; 2023; 2024

Costa Rica competed at the 2019 World Aquatics Championships in Gwangju, South Korea from 12 to 28 July.

== Artistic swimming ==
Costa Rica's artistic swimming team consisted of 10 athletes (10 female).

Women

Athlete	Event	Preliminaries		Final	
Athlete	Event	Points	Rank	Points	Rank
Natalia Jenkins	Solo technical routine	67.8807	27	did not advance	
Valeria Lizano	Solo free routine	67.1333	31	did not advance	
Natalia Jenkins; Valeria Lizano; Mariana Solis (R)	Duet technical routine	63.9830	43	did not advance	
Natalia Jenkins; Valeria Lizano; Mariana Solis (R)	Duet free routine	63.9000	44	did not advance	
Maria Paula Alfaro; Alexa Alpizar; N'Hara Calvo; Ambar Garcia (R); Natalia Jenkins; Jimena Lizano; Valeria Lizano; Andrea Maroto; Mariana Solis (R); Raquel Zuniga	Team technical routine	65.5853	23	did not advance	

Legend: (R) = Reserve Athlete

== Open water swimming ==
Costa Rica qualified one male and one female open water swimmers.

Men

Athlete	Event	Time	Rank
Cristofer Lanuza	Men's 5 km	1:00:38.9	55
Cristofer Lanuza	Men's 10 km	2:10:16.8	73

Women

Athlete	Event	Time	Rank
Genesis Rojas	Women's 5 km	1:12:55.7	54
Genesis Rojas	Women's 10 km	2:23:29.4	63

== Swimming ==
Costa Rica entered three swimmers.

Men

Athlete	Event	Heat		Semifinal		Final	
Athlete	Event	Time	Rank	Time	Rank	Time	Rank
Bryan Alvaréz	100 m butterfly	56.04	54	did not advance			
Bryan Alvaréz	200 m butterfly	2:04.71	43	did not advance			
Arnoldo Herrera	100 m breaststroke	1:06.42	72	did not advance			
Arnoldo Herrera	200 m breaststroke	2:25.70	51	did not advance			

Women

Athlete	Event	Heat		Semifinal		Final	
Athlete	Event	Time	Rank	Time	Rank	Time	Rank
Amanda Alfaro	200 m freestyle	2:06.60	39	did not advance			
Amanda Alfaro	400 m freestyle	4:29.91	35	—		did not advance	
