= Rafael Ángel Calderón =

Rafael Ángel Calderón may refer to:

- Rafael Ángel Calderón Guardia, president of Costa Rica from 1940 to 1944
- Rafael Ángel Calderón Fournier, president of Costa Rica from 1990 to 1994; son of the above
