= 1870 Costa Rican presidential referendum =

A referendum on appointing Tomás Guardia Gutiérrez as President with special powers was held in Costa Rica on 8 August 1870. It was approved, and Gutiérrez assumed the presidency on 11 September.

== Background ==
On 27 April 1870 Gutiérrez had been one of a group of army officers who had deposed President Jesús Jiménez Zamora. Bruno Carranza had become president, but Gutiérrez had held real power. After three months, he replaced Carranza.

== Aftermath ==
On 15 October 1871 Gutiérrez convened a Constitutional Council, which adopted a new constitution on 7 December. It allowed for the election of a military person as President. Gutiérrez subsequently remained in office until his death in 1882.
