= History of the Jews in Costa Rica =

The history of the Jews in Costa Rica dates back to the Spanish conquest with the arrival of many Sephardic converts known as Marranos who escaped from the Spanish Inquisition and settled mainly in the city of Cartago and its surroundings. They hid their Jewish past by all means, making even their descendants have no idea of it.

The Jewish community is an integral part of Costa Rican society. Costa Rica has had four vice presidents of Ashkenazi Jewish origin; Rebeca Grynspan, Astrid Fischel, Luis Fishman, several Jewish deputies and ministers, and a Jewish first lady, Doris Yankelewitz. The current Jewish community is estimated at some 2,000 Ashkenazi and about 850 Sephardic arrivals in the twentieth century.

== History ==
The country has had three major waves of Jewish immigration; the first, that of Sephardi, arrived at the time of colonization, who were mainly located in Cartago and who converted to Catholicism, which was the compulsory religion at that time. They assimilated into the Costa Rican colonial society and lost their Jewish traditions and identity. In the nineteenth century Sephardic merchants arrived from Curaçao, Jamaica, Panama and the Caribbean, settling in the Central Valley and converting to Catholicism. The possible permanence of crypto-Jews who practiced Judaism secretly in Escazú is pointed out by some as an origin of the legend of the "Witches of Escazú", a myth so deeply rooted that the figure of the witch has become part of the canton's identity.

The oldest Jewish community in Costa Rica was Sephardic. The first Sephardic Jews arrived in colonial times and settled in the colonial capital Cartago and its surroundings. The largest migration of Sephardic Jews occurred in the nineteenth century from Panama, Jamaica, Curaçao and Saint Thomas, the majority settling in Alajuela and San José and prospering in trade. Some of these families were the Sasso, the Robles, the Maduro, the Halman, the Méndez-Chumaceiro, the Salas de Lima and, arriving as conversos, the Lindo and the Piza. This community maintained close blood and family ties by marrying each other.

The Sephardic Jews, like the Protestants, Muslims and Baháʼís, were interred in the "Foreign Cemetery" regardless of their nationality, because this was the only cemetery for non-Catholics until the secularization of cemeteries in 1884. Even after of the creation of the Hebrew Cemetery, the Sephardim largely maintained the custom of using the Foreign Cemetery.

The second great emigration occurred in the early twentieth century, especially due to the rise of Nazism in Europe and mainly from Poland. One of the villages that most Jewish immigrants came from was Siedlce and another was Żelechów. This population, predominantly Ashkenazi, was devoted mainly to door-to-door sales and payments, thus the name "polaco" (Spanish for Polish people) became a colloquial synonym for Jews, as well as for door-to-door salesmen in general. In Yiddish, these door-to-door salesmen were known as "kloppers" (knockers).

The Ashkenazi community, the largest one, is almost entirely from Poland and the majority of synagogues belong to this ethnic group. Like the Sephardi, the community has maintained a close family bond between members of the same group. The Ashkenazi population was mostly located in San José, especially in the areas of Paseo Colón and La Sabana. They also settled in suburbs of San José such as Escazú.

The first Ashkenazi Jew known to settle in Costa Rica and the founder of its Ashkenazi community, was Max Teitelbaum (also sometimes written as Taitelbaum), from Siedlce, Poland. After Max cut off his trigger finger to try to avoid being recruited into the Polish army (which sent Jews to the front lines, usually to their deaths), the Polish government was after him for recruitment and he had to flee in 1928, despite desperate pleas by his wife not to leave. He made it onto a ship from Hamburg to Argentina, but the boat was forced to stop in Port Limon on the Caribbean coast of Costa Rica after workers on the ship went on strike. While waiting in San José for a boat to take him the rest of the way to Argentina, he decided to remain in the country when he realized it had a relatively stable democratic government and his door-to-door sales business began to take off. After making money in the business, he bought tickets for family, relatives and then a number of friends and others. Reports are that a majority of the Ashkenazi Jews in Costa Rica stem from Max Teitelbaum's successful efforts to bring over as many Jews as he could. The last home of Max Teitelbaum is now the Spanish Embassy in San José.

The first Orthodox synagogue was founded in San José under the name Shaarei Zion. Max Teitelbaum was one of the founders of the synagogue and his name was engraved at the top of the metal founders plaque in the synagogue's original location.

Both the Ashkenazi and Sephardic communities usually remain separated with family unions only within the same ethnic line. An exception was the Fischel-Robles family, after the marriage of the Ashkenazi dentist Maximiliano Fischel Hirshberg with the Sephardic Ada Robles Sasso, family to the former Vice President Astrid Fischel Volio and the founders of the Fischel Pharmaceutical Corporation.

Antisemitic rhetoric became common after the first wave in the political discourse and media at the time. Notable antisemites included Otilio Ulate Blanco, owner of the Diario de Costa Rica newspaper and future president, and poet Luis Dobles Segreda. During this period a local Nazi Party/Foreign Organization chapter (NSDAP/AO) was founded by a faction of the German and Italian communities.

During the 1930s the nationalistic government of León Cortés Castro (1936–1940) was hostile to the Jews and restricted their entry into the country as well as implementing policies that limited their economic development. Cortés closed the country to further Jewish immigration and appointed Max Effinger as Migration Director, who was the leader of the local NSDAP/AO.

Things did not improve immediately during the next government of Rafael Ángel Calderón Guardia (1940–1944) influenced by National Catholicism, although after the declaration of war against the Axis powers in 1941 the government focused on the persecution of Germans, Italians and Japanese. The relations improved definitively during the subsequent administration of Teodoro Picado Michalski (1944–1948), himself the son of a Polish mother, who lifted economic restrictions from the time of Cortés.

The Calderónist government of Picado faced fierce opposition during that tense decade. The opposition candidate in the 1948 elections was Otilio Ulate Blanco. Ulate was the presumed winner of the elections, although with mutual accusations of voter fraud, which caused rejection of the results by the ruling party and finally the outbreak of a revolution. The rebellious side, led by José Figueres and Ulate (and in which many Italians and Germans served, for obvious reasons opposed to Calderón) was the victor. At first, the Jewish community was seen as close to the regime and the San José Synagogue was burned, however, Figueres promised to the Jewish community not to tolerate antisemitic attacks.

Apart from these complex ethnic tensions of the 1940s, the relationship of the Jews with the rest of Costa Rican society has been generally stable. Costa Rica voted in favor of the establishment of the State of Israel in 1948 and was, along with El Salvador for many years, one of the only countries with embassies in Jerusalem. This was modified in 2007 when, during the second Óscar Arias administration, the embassy was moved to Tel Aviv and Costa Rica established diplomatic relations with the Arab world. Under the presidency of Laura Chinchilla Costa Rica voted in favor of the entry of Palestine to the UN and UNESCO and during the government of Luis Guillermo Solís the Costa Rican chancellery condemned Operation Protective Edge in Gaza in 2014.

The third great migratory wave of Jews occurred in the nineties, of Americans and Israelis who retired to spend their last years in Costa Rica. In 2013, the Costa Rican population was 4,870,000 and the Jewish population was estimated at about 2,000 individuals. In 2020, the Jewish population of Costa rica was estimated at 2,500 individuals.

== Antisemitism and growth of Neo-Nazism ==
Since the 1930s, there were a significant number of Costa Ricans and Germans based in Costa Rica sympathetic to fascism and National Socialism, however the country supported the Allies during the Second World War. The president of the Nazi Party of Costa Rica at that time was Max Effinger, a Costa Rican of German origin, who was appointed as an immigration advisor in the government of León Cortés Castro. Other notable anti-Semites were Otilio Ulate Blanco, Luis Dobles Segreda, and to lesser extent Rafael Ángel Calderón Guardia, according to Jacobo Schifter, Lowell Gudmundson and Mario Solera.

Despite the existence of an Anti-Zionist component of the far-right Free Costa Rica Movement active between the 60s and 90s, no major anti-Semitic controversy was notable until the 2002 Costa Rican general election in which Vice-Presidential nominee Luis Fishman Zonzinski assured that after being fired by Abel Pacheco de la Espriella's campaign team Pacheco and collaborators made anti-Semitic comments. The deputy for the 2010–2014 period Nestor Manrique Oviedo Guzmán then of the Citizens' Action Party (although later he defects to National Restoration), accused then Vice President of the Republic, Luis Liberman, of benefiting his Jewish co-religionists in a network of corruption. His statements were condemned by the benches of the main political parties (including Oviedo's party) and by the Jewish community that issued a statement through the Israelite Center and the Governing Council of that period. The most recent case of an important political figure whose statements were accused of anti-Semitism was that of right-wing populist candidate Juan Diego Castro who in a 2019 video accused Leonel Baruch, owner of the newspaper CRHoy and of Jewish origin, of being an "evil banker" and made comments mocking the Holocaust. His statements were condemned by the Jewish community, the Israeli embassy and most of the benches of the Legislative Assembly.

In April 2012, it was discovered through Facebook that a young police officer was an adherent of Nazism and a member of a neo-Nazi group. This, in turn, led to the discovery that there were several adherents in the police forces or the Costa Rican Public Force. The officer in question was dismissed and the authorities investigated the connection of Costa Rican police to the extreme right. The young man was identified as Ronald "Murdoch" Herrera and father of three daughters.

In 2015, the Simon Wiesenthal Center asked the Costa Rican government to close a store in San José that sells Nazi paraphernalia, Holocaust denial books and other products associated with Nazism.

In 2018, it transpired that a series of neo-Nazi Facebook pages had openly or discreetly carried out a vast campaign instigating xenophobic hatred by recycling old news or divulging Fake news, which ended in an anti-migration rally in La Merced Park in San José with the participation of some far-right and neo-Nazi groups (although not all participants were of such). An anti-xenophobic rally was organized the exact next week.
