= Mariano Montealegre Bustamante =

Costa Rican politician (1783–1843)

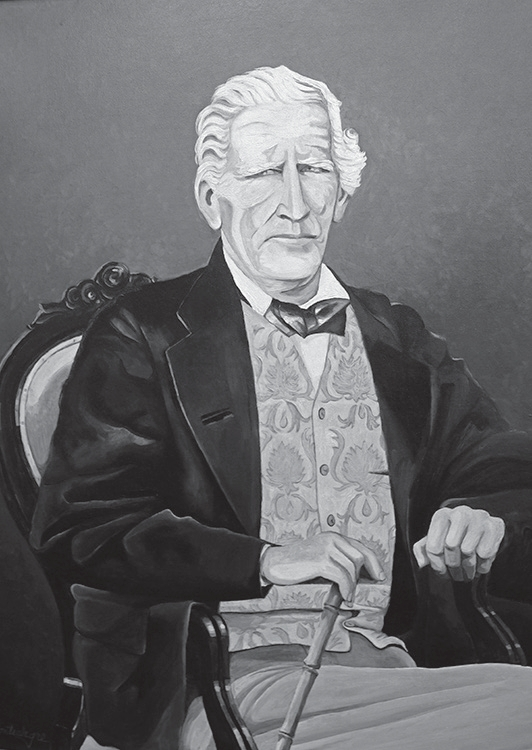
- Portrait of Mariano Montealegre in the Braulio Carrillo Diplomatic Museum, by Mariano Montealegre Mata (1994)

1st Vice Head of State of Costa Rica
- In office 8 September 1824 – 7 April 1825
- President: Juan Mora Fernández
- Preceded by: Office established
- Succeeded by: José Rafael de Gallegos y Alvarado

Diplomatic Commissioner of Costa Rica to the Governments of León and Granada
- In office 12 May 1823 – 23 December 1823

Personal details
- Born: August 1, 1783 Guatemala City, Captaincy General of Guatemala
- Died: November 18, 1843 (aged 60) San José, Free State of Costa Rica
- Party: Liberal
- Spouse: Gerónima Fernández Chacón (m. 1815; died 1843)
- Domestic partner: Petronila del Castillo Villagra (prior domestic partnership)
- Children: 12, including José María, Mariano, Francisco, Gerónima
- Parent(s): Mariano Ignacio de Montealegre Balmaceda; Josefa Bustamante
- Occupation: Politician, diplomat, businessman, coffee grower
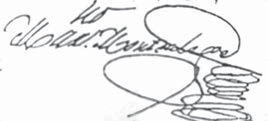
- Signature
- Nickname: "El rey del café" (The Coffee King)

Mariano Montealegre Bustamante (1 August 1783 – 18 November 1843) was a Guatemalan-born Costa Rican politician, diplomat, entrepreneur, and merchant. He is historically recognized as the first diplomat in the history of Costa Rica and the country's first Vice Head of State. He was also a key pioneer in the large-scale production and exportation of coffee in Costa Rica.

== Biography ==
Montealegre was born in Guatemala City in August 1783. He was the son of Mariano Ignacio de Montealegre Balmaceda (1758–1803), a native of Granada, Spain, and Josefa Bustamante (1779–1835), a Guatemalan. He was also a half-brother of Mariano Montealegre y Romero, the founder of the prominent Montealegre family in Nicaragua.

In April 1815, he married Gerónima Fernández Chacón in San José. She was the widow of Félix Fernández y Carranza (d. 1814) and sister of Head of State Manuel Fernández Chacón. The couple had twelve children:

1. José María Montealegre Fernández (1815–1887), President of Costa Rica from 1859 to 1863; married first in 1840 to Ana María Mora Porras (1819–1854), sister of Presidents Miguel Mora Porras and Juan Rafael Mora Porras, and second in 1858 to Sofía Matilde Joy Redman (1823–1908), a British national.
2. Mariano Montealegre Fernández (1816–1900), married in 1846 to Guadalupe Gallegos Sáenz (d. 1905), daughter of Chief of State José Rafael de Gallegos y Alvarado.
3. Josefa Montealegre Fernández (1817–1821).
4. Francisco Montealegre Fernández (1818–1875), married in 1852 to Josefa Victoriana Gallegos Sáenz (1827–1876), daughter of Chief of State José Rafael de Gallegos y Alvarado.
5. Martín Montealegre Fernández (1819–1820).
6. María Cecilia Montealegre Fernández (1820–1821).
7. María Encarnación Montealegre Fernández (1822–1890), unmarried, she was highly active in charity work and initiatives supporting the San José Orphanage (Hospicio de Huérfanos de San José).
8. Gerónima Montealegre Fernández (1823–1892), married in 1848 to Bruno Carranza Ramírez, President of the Republic in 1870.
9. María Sara Montealegre Fernández (1826–circa 1839).
10. Josefa Leonor Montealegre Fernández (1827–1861), unmarried.
11. María Aurelia Montealegre Fernández (1828–1883), married in 1859 to José Concepción Pinto y Castro (1828–1898), prosecutor and magistrate of the Supreme Court of Justice of Costa Rica and son of Chief of State Antonio Pinto Soares.
12. Leopoldo Montealegre Fernández (1832–1892), married in 1860 to Ermida Quirós Flores (1843–1899), daughter of General José Manuel Quirós y Blanco.

Additionally, from a prior partnership with Petronila del Castillo Villagra widow of Casiano Porras y Sandoval and sister of Florencio del Castillo, President of the Cádiz Cortes he had two daughters:

- Magdalena del Castillo Villagra (1811–1875), married first in 1827 to Santiago Millet Saint-Jean (d. 1838), a French national, and second in 1838 to Gregorio Escalante Nava (marriage annulled in 1855).
- Antonia Rita del Castillo Villagra (1813–1866), married in 1838 to Léonce De Vars Dumartray, a French national.

Through these lineages, the American actress Madeleine Stowe and the actress Felicia Montealegre (wife of composer Leonard Bernstein) are direct descendants of Don Mariano.

== Royal Tobacco Factory ==
Before settling in Costa Rica, Montealegre served in the Royal Tobacco Factories (Factorías de Tabacos) of Nicaragua and San Salvador, establishing a reputation for institutional administrative organization. He settled permanently in Costa Rica around 1809. In 1818, he was appointed the administrative Director of Tobacco (Factor de Tabacos) of Costa Rica, a critical state monopoly. He managed this role with diligence and administrative success through a long period encompassing the transition to Central American independence.

== Diplomatic Mission in Nicaragua ==
In May 1823, the Junta Superior Gubernativa of Costa Rica appointed Montealegre as its Diplomatic Commissioner to the conflict-ridden rival governments of Granada and León in Nicaragua. Upon receiving the nomination, Montealegre famously declined it out of modesty, stating:

"If my short intellect has been able to grasp something of the importance of this commission, it has also made me realize that whoever carries it out must be endowed with an education and knowledge far superior to my limited skills... I am strictly obliged not to deceive my Country by accepting posts or commissions which by mistake have been conferred upon me. This is my case, then, I find myself compelled to express to Your Excellency that I lack the training to perform the duties of an Envoy, because I have never attended a single classroom and because I lack a thousand things, especially political knowledge..."

Despite his objections, the governing council confirmed his appointment, making Montealegre the first formal diplomat in Costa Rican history. He carried out his mission with high responsibility and tact, successfully navigating the civil unrest in Nicaragua to secure regional stability. His efforts led to the signing of the Montealegre-Velasco Treaty with Granada and the Montealegre-Solís Treaty with León, securing peace and boundaries during a turbulent era for Central America.

== Public and Political Offices ==
Following his diplomatic success, Montealegre served as the first Vice Head of State of Costa Rica from 1824 to 1825, alongside Head of State Juan Mora Fernández. Later in life, he was elected as a member of the Constituent Assembly of 1842; however, due to severe health issues, he was unable to take his seat.

== Private Enterprise and Legacy ==
Montealegre was deeply invested in the economic modernization of the early Republic. He pioneered the cultivation of coffee near San José, establishing major plantations and introducing advanced agricultural processing techniques. He eventually became the largest coffee producer and exporter of his era, earning the popular moniker "El Rey del Café" (The Coffee King). Beyond agriculture, he owned a major commercial trading house in San José and invested heavily in gold mining operations in the Aguacate mountains (Monte del Aguacate). In his final years, he focused on civic education, public instruction, and published several emotional socio-political essays aimed at raising civic consciousness among Costa Ricans.

== Death ==
Montealegre died in San José, Costa Rica, on 18 November 1843 at the age of 60. He was buried in the general cemetery of San José.
