= Saúl Weisleder =

Costa Rican politician and academic (born 1950)

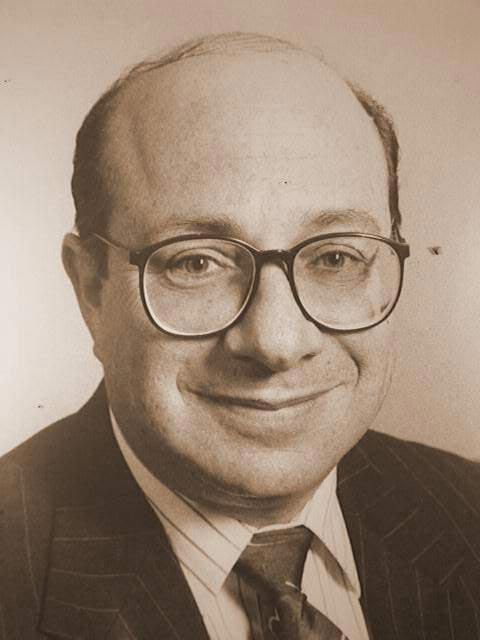

39th President of the Legislative Assembly of Costa Rica
- In office 1 May 1997 – 30 April 1998
- Preceded by: Jorge Walter Coto Molina
- Succeeded by: Luis Fishman Zonzinski

Deputy of the Legislative Assembly of Costa Rica
- In office 1 May 1994 – 30 April 1998
- Preceded by: William Muñoz Céspedes
- Succeeded by: Álvaro Trejos Fonseca
- Constituency: San José (5th Office)

Personal details
- Born: Saúl Weisleder Weisleder; 11 October 1950 (age 75) San José, Costa Rica
- Party: National Liberation Party
- Spouse: Rebeca Grynspan (m. 1978)
- Children: 1
- Education: University of Costa Rica; University of Sussex
- Occupation: Economist; sociologist; professor; politician; academic administrator

Saúl Weisleder Weisleder (born 11 October 1950) is a Costa Rican economist, academic and politician who served as Costa Rican Alternate Permanent Representative to the United Nations until 2014. A member of the National Liberation Party, he previously served as President of the Legislative Assembly from 1997 to 1998, and as a member of the Legislative Assembly of Costa Rica from 1994 to 1998.

== Biography ==
Weisleder was born in San José, on October 11, 1950 to a Jewish family. He graduated with a degree in economics and a Bachelor's degree in sociology from Universidad de Costa Rica, as well as a Master's degree in philosophy from University of Sussex.

Weisleder worked as a Professor in the Faculty of Social Sciences at the National University of Costa Rica, where he also served as dean. Outside of his academic work, he has served as a consultant to the banking and finance industries.

He is married to former Costa Rican Vice President Rebeca Grynspan Mayufis.
