= Claudia Dobles Camargo =

Costa Rican architect and urban planner (born 1980)

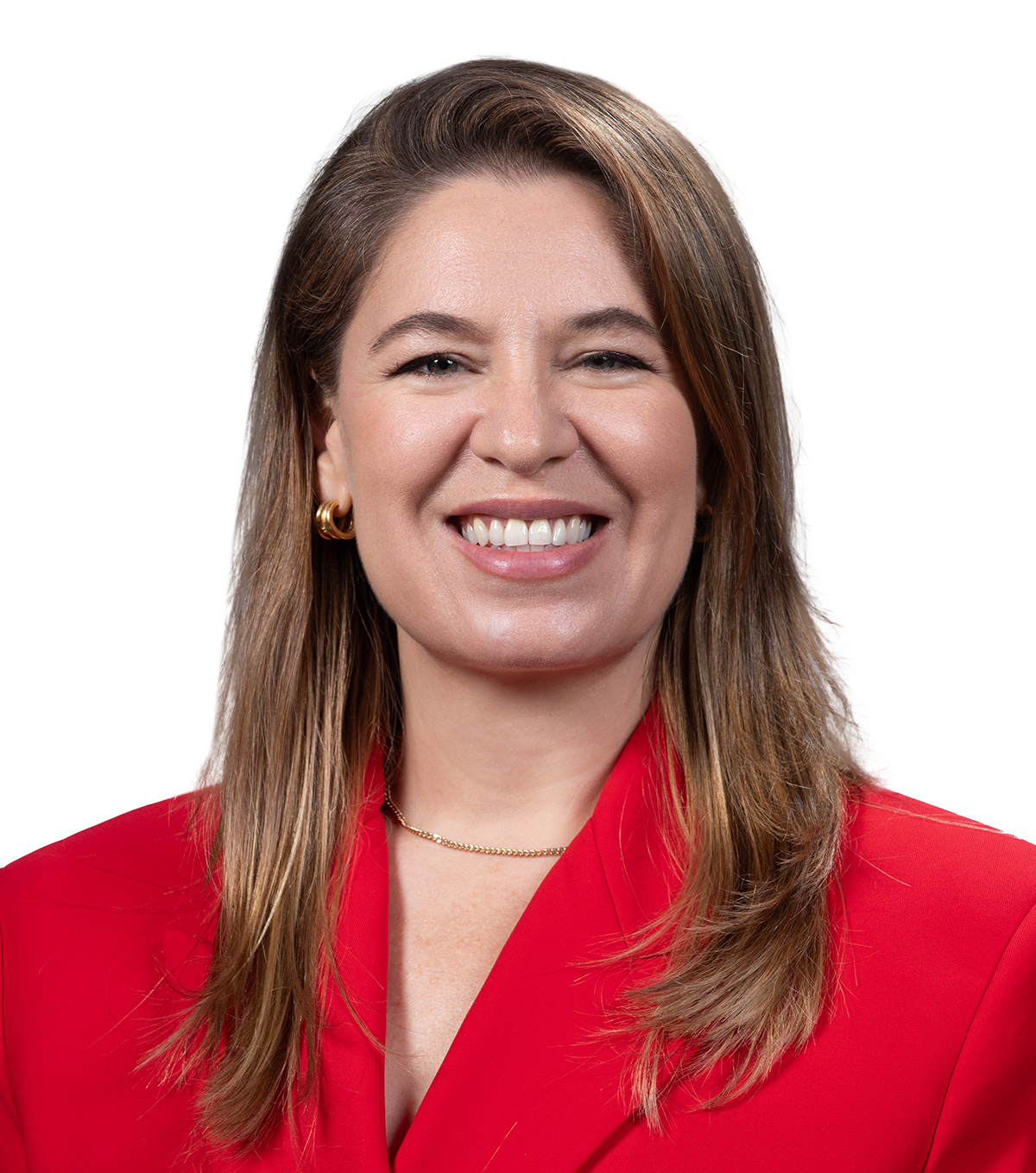
- Official portrait, 2026

Deputy of the Legislative Assembly of Costa Rica
- Incumbent
- Assumed Office; 1 May 2026
- Preceded by: Gloria Navas Montero
- Constituency: San José (17th Office)

First Lady of Costa Rica
- In role 8 May 2018 – 8 May 2022
- President: Carlos Alvarado Quesada
- Preceded by: Mercedes Peñas Domingo
- Succeeded by: Signe Zeikate

Personal details
- Born: Claudia Vanessa Dobles Camargo; 19 November 1980 (age 45) Ciudad Quesada, Costa Rica
- Party: Citizens' Action
- Spouse: Carlos Alvarado Quesada (m. 2010)
- Children: 1
- Education: University of Costa Rica (BS); Massachusetts Institute of Technology (MSc)
- Occupation: Architect; urban planner; politician; businesswoman

Claudia Vanessa Dobles Camargo (born 19 November 1980) is a Costa Rican architect, urban planner and politician who has served as a deputy in the Legislative Assembly since 2026. A member of the Citizens' Action Party, she previously served as the First Lady of Costa Rica from 2018 to 2022.

Dobles was also a candidate in the 2026 presidential election. She is the first person from San Carlos to have served as first lady of Costa Rica.

== Early life ==
Dobles was born on 19 November 1980, in Ciudad Quesada, San Carlos to Carlos Tobías Dobles Ramírez and María Claudia Camargo García. Her father is Costa Rican, while her mother had moved to the country from Mexico. She attended kindergarten in Mexico, but completed her elementary studies in San José, Costa Rica. For high school, Dobles attended private school She met her future husband, Carlos Alvarado Quesada, on the bus that both took to school.

== Prominent roles ==
Dobles played a prominent role in her husband's 2018 presidential campaign. In addition to her role as the candidate's wife, Dobles was seen as a key advisor to both Alvarado and the campaign staff.

Dobles is also advising the Costa Rican government on its environmental economic plan to completely replace the nation's use of fossil fuels with renewable energy sources.

== Political positions ==
Dobles has supported policy proposals related to secular governance, social inclusion, and institutional modernization. Her positions include endorsing constitutional reforms to establish a fully secular State by removing the formal religious designation currently present in Costa Rica's legal framework.

She has also supported initiatives centered on equality and non-discrimination, including the reinstatement of the official observance of the International Day Against Homophobia, Transphobia, and Biphobia on 17 May; the restoration of an interinstitutional Presidential Commissioner for LGBTIQ+ Affairs; and the establishment of formal cooperation mechanisms between public institutions and civil-society organizations that work on issues of sexual and gender diversity.

Her policy positions further encompass the implementation of inclusive educational frameworks, expanded access to sexual and reproductive health services, the application of existing technical norms related to therapeutic abortion, and the availability of contraception programs for adolescents, migrants, and other vulnerable groups. She has advocated for the institutional mainstreaming of gender and intersectionality across public agencies, along with broader efforts to modernize State structures, improve access to health services, enhance social protections, and support women and other at-risk populations.

Among her stated priorities should she become president were security and coordination with the Legislature and Judiciary to solve urgent matters.

== Controversies ==
=== Electric passenger train project ===
During the Alvarado administration, Dobles was one of the most visible promoters of the proposed electric passenger train for the greater Metropolitan area. The initiative sparked broad public debate over its financial and technical feasibility. The Comptroller General issued several technical observations, noting insufficient pre-investment studies, inconsistent interinstitutional coordination, and the need to update demand and fiscal analyses before continuing with the plan.

Opposition parties in the Legislative Assembly also questioned the project's viability and signaled that the international loans required for its financing were unlikely to be approved. Despite this, the government continued to support the initiative and declared it to be of public interest.

=== Use of public resources ===
Dobles' office operated with a team of approximately ten advisers paid with public funds, with monthly salaries ranging widely according to role and seniority. This structure was questioned by some legislators, who argued that the First Lady did not hold administrative responsibilities that justified a staff of that size.

=== Punta Islita helicopter trip ===
In August 2020, President Alvarado and Dobles traveled with their family to a hotel in Guanacaste by private helicopter. The trip took place during COVID-19 restrictions and at a time when the hotel was not operating for the general public, which generated criticism. Initial government statements indicated that the couple had covered all expenses; subsequent information clarified that the flight costs had been shared between the President and a government minister who helped arrange the trip.

Opposition lawmakers criticized the handling of the situation and questioned the transparency of the explanations provided.

The Public Prosecutor's Office opened an investigation to determine whether the trip constituted illicit enrichment for the presidential couple. The case was dismissed in 2022 after authorities concluded that all lodging, food, and transportation expenses had been covered with personal funds and that no criminal offense occurred.

=== Public image and opinion ===
Following her tenure as First Lady and her subsequent entry into electoral politics with the Coalición Agenda Ciudadana (CAC), Dobles's public image faced high disapproval ratings across both digital platforms and quantitative polls. In early 2026, a digital analytics study titled "Radiografía de la Comunicación digital del Proceso Político – Electoral" by the Universidad Latina de Costa Rica revealed that Dobles was among the political figures with the highest volume of unfavorable online interactions, with 78% of social media comments directed at her being negative. In February of the same year, during a tour of the Limón province to discuss local infrastructure projects, a section of the attendees interrupted her events with chants of disapproval. The then-elected lawmaker downplayed the incident, framing it as a normal part of democratic dynamics.

Subsequently, in May 2026, a public opinion poll conducted by OPol Consultores confirmed this trend of public dissatisfaction. The study placed Dobles as the political figure with the highest net disapproval rating in the country, registering a net negative balance of -49.1% regarding her image and political management.
