= Pacífica Fernández =

War nurse and heroine

Pacífica Fernández Oreamuno
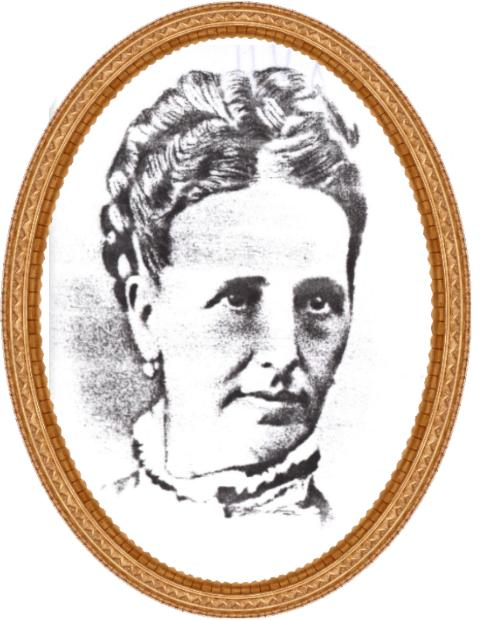

First Lady of Costa Rica
- In role May 8, 1847 – August 31, 1848
- Succeeded by: Felipa Montes de Oca Gamero

Personal details
- Born: August 23, 1828 San José, Costa Rica
- Died: March 31, 1885 (aged 56) San José, Costa Rica
- Spouse: José María Castro Madriz
- Parent(s): Dolores Oreamuno Muñoz de la Trinidad and Manuel Fernández Chacón
- Known for: First Lady of Costa Rica and designer of current Flag of Costa Rica

Pacífica Fernández Oreamuno (August 23, 1828 – March 31, 1885) was the inaugural First Lady of Costa Rica and wife of President José María Castro Madriz. She was born in San José, Costa Rica on August 23, 1828 to her parents former Head of State Manuel Fernández Chacón and Dolores Oreamuno Muñoz de la Trinidad, and was sister of President Próspero Fernández Oreamuno.

She married José María Castro Madriz on June 29, 1843, who later became Head of State (1847–1848) and President of the Republic of Costa Rica (1848–1849 and 1866–1868). She still holds the title as the youngest First Lady or spouse of a Costa Rican head of state, as she was only 18 when her husband first gained power.

She suggested a red stripe be added to the flag of Costa Rica, based on the flag of France. The new flag was first sewn on November 12, 1848.

Fernández died in San José, Costa Rica on March 31, 1885.
