= María Eugenia Casar =

UN official

María Eugenia (Gina) Casar is a Mexican civil servant who serves as the Executive Director of the Mexican Agency of International Development Cooperation (AMEXCID). In 2020, United Nations Secretary-General António Guterres, World Food Programme (WFP) Executive Director David Beasley and Food and Agriculture Organization (FAO) Director-General Qu Dongyu appointed her as WFP Senior Adviser at the Assistant Secretary-General level.

== Education ==
Casar holds an undergraduate degree in public accounting, and a Master of Business Administration from the Instituto Tecnológico Autónomo de México.

== Career ==
Casar began her career in academia and headed the School of Accounting and Administration at the Instituto Tecnológico Autónomo de México.

Casar's experience at the national level prior to joining the United Nations includes positions as National Treasurer of Mexico; Chief Financial Officer, Banco Nacional de Servicios Financieros; Deputy General Director, Banking Sector, Ministry of Finance; and Deputy Vice-President, National Banking Commission in Mexico.

Casar worked previously for the World Food Programme in Rome where she served as Assistant Secretary-General and Deputy Executive Director for Resource Management and Accountability and Chief Financial Officer (2009-2011), and Chief Financial Officer and Director of Finance and Budget (2004-2006).

Casar served as the Assistant Secretary-General for Programme Planning, Budget and Accounts, Controller and Representative of the Secretary-General for the investments of the assets of the United Nations Joint Staff Pension Fund.

From 2014 to 2015, Casar was the Associate Administrator of the United Nations Development Programme (UNDP). In that role, she succeeded Rebeca Grynspan of Costa Rica. As Associate Administrator of UNDP, Casar held the rank of Under-Secretary-General of the United Nations.
