= Beatriz Zamora López =

First Lady of Costa Rica (1871-1933)

First Lady of Costa Rica
- In role 8 May 1932 – 6 February 1933

Personal details
- Born: 1871 Villa de Pacaca, Costa Rica
- Died: February 6, 1933 (aged 61–62) San José, Costa Rica
- Cause of death: Stomach cancer
- Spouse: Ricardo Jiménez Oreamuno
- Parent(s): Jesús Zamora Zúñiga and María Josefa López Torres
- Known for: Prostitute, First Lady of Costa Rica

Beatriz Zamora López (1871 – 6 February 1933) was the first wife of Ricardo Jiménez Oreamuno and First Lady of Costa Rica during the third and last presidency of her husband. She was a controversial figure at the time because she had practised prostitution prior to her romance and marriage to Jiménez.

== Biography ==
López was born in Villa de Pacaca, now named Ciudad Colón, Costa Rica, in 1871, the daughter of Jesús Zamora Zúñiga and María Josefa López Torres. While still young, and with her sister Vicenta, she moved to the capital, San José to serve as a domestic servant in a high society house. She desired to have the luxurious life that was denied to her by her humble origins, so, along with her sister, she entered prostitution. Through this work she met the jurist and liberal politician Ricardo Jiménez Oreamuno; the only person in the history of Costa Rica who has been elected president of Costa Rica on three separate occasions. Jimenez and López had a relationship for many years before they were finally married after his second term as president. The Apostolic Nuncio, Monsignor Giuseppe Fieta, officiated at the ceremony on 21 December 1928.

=== First Lady ===
When Jiménez entered his third term as president López became First Lady, but had to endure ridicule and sarcasm from Costa Rica's high society as a result of her previous profession, sometimes being unkindly referred to as La Cucaracha (cockroach). She spoke English and French and learned various cultural, political and historical issues thanks to her highly educated husband. She carried out humanitarian work as First Lady with little support. With help from some friends and the Mercedarian Sisters, López worked to helping those in need, including the inmates of San Lucas Island. She also helped artists and writers who were in need.

=== Death ===
A few months after becoming First Lady, López began to have a variety of physical discomforts and traveled to the US to consult with doctors there. They diagnosed advanced stomach cancer. López died in San José, after less than a year in office, on 6 February 1933, her husband's 74th birthday, She was buried at dawn the following morning with only her husband and a small number of relatives present.

== In media ==
Artist Fausto Pacheco was imprisoned in 1924 on the orders of Jiménez for drawing and publishing a political cartoon mocking the President's relationship with López.

In 2016 a play was presented at the Eugene O'Neill Theatre in San Pedro, Costa Rica entitled La Mariposa y el Presidente (The Butterfly and the President). The play sought to portray the life of López without the prejudices that the Costa Rican society had shown against her during her lifetime.
