= Josette Altmann Borbón =

Costa Rican historian and politician

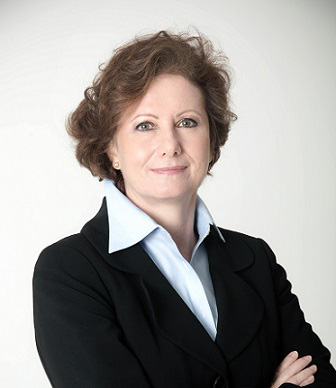

First Lady of Costa Rica
- In role May 8, 1994 – May 8, 1998
- President: José María Figueres
- Preceded by: Gloria Bejarano Almada
- Succeeded by: Lorena Clare Facio

Personal details
- Born: February 17, 1958 (age 68) San José, Costa Rica
- Party: Citizens' Action Party (2005–present)
- Other political affiliations: National Liberation Party (until 2005)
- Spouse: José María Figueres (divorced)
- Children: 2
- Education: Leiden University; University of Costa Rica
- Profession: Historian

Josette Altmann Borbón (born February 17, 1958) is a Costa Rican historian, public figure and politician. She previously served as the First Lady of Costa Rica from 1994 to 1998 during the tenure of her ex-husband, former President José María Figueres. In June 2016, Altmann was elected Secretary General of the Latin American Social Sciences Institute (FLACSO), an inter-governmental organization dedicated to researching and teaching of the social sciences in Latin America and the Caribbean. She is the first woman to become Secretary General of FLACSO.

== Biography ==
Altmann Borbón holds a bachelor's degree in history and a master's degree in political science from the University of Costa Rica. She received her doctorate in humanities from Leiden University in the Netherlands.

She has served as a post-graduate professor at the University of Costa Rica's Department of Education and Social Sciences.

On June 3, 2016, Altmann was elected Secretary General of FLACSO. Altmann had previously worked as a regional coordinator of international cooperation for FLACSO's General Secretariat from 2006 to 2012.

Honorary titles
| Preceded by Gloria Bejarano Almada | First Lady of Costa Rica; 1994–1998 | Succeeded by Lorena Clare Facio |
