= Emilia Solórzano Alfaro =

First Lady of Costa Rica (1835-1914)

- Born: December 8, 1835; Alajuela, Costa Rica
- Died: July 18, 1914 (aged 78); San José, Costa Rica
- Known for: First Lady of Costa Rica
- Spouse: Tomás Guardia Gutiérrez (m. 1857; died 1882)
- Children: 5
- Parent(s): María Canuta Alfaro y González and Rafael del Pilar Solórzano y Alvarado

Emilia Solórzano Alfaro (December 8, 1835 – July 18, 1914) was the First Lady of Costa Rica during the periods of 1870–1876 and 1877–1882.

She was born in Alajuela on December 8, 1835, to her parents, Rafael del Pilar Solórzano y Alvarado and María Canuta Alfaro y González. She married Tomás Guardia Gutiérrez in Alajuela on April 18, 1857. This marriage resulted in five children: Angélica (who later married President Saturnino Lizano Gutiérrez), Rudesindo, Rosario, Emilia and Isabel Guardia Solórzano.

She became First Lady on August 10, 1870, and left the post on May 8, 1876. She regained the title on September 23, 1877, to July 6, 1882. As First Lady, she attended the wedding between Alfonso XII of Spain and Mercedes of Orléans and the crowning of Pope Leo XIII. She negotiated the 1878 establishment of the Order of Sion, which opened secondary schools in Alajuela and San José.

She died in San José on July 18, 1914.
