= Ibero-American General Secretariat =

Body in an international organization

- Secretaría General Iberoamericana; Secretaria-Geral Ibero-Americana

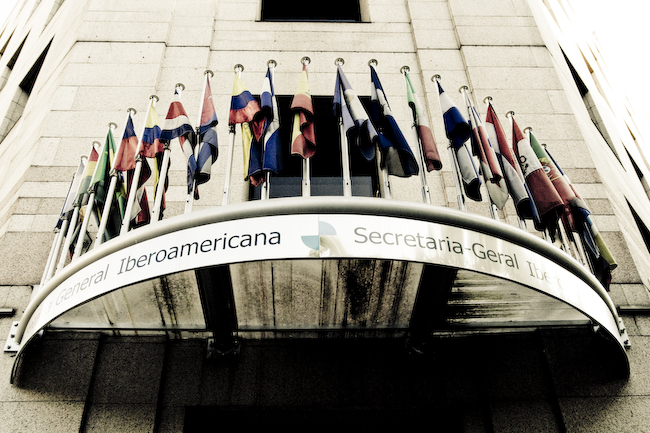
- Nickname: SEGIB
- Formation: 2005
- Secretary-General: Marcos Pinta Gama (a.i.)

The Ibero-American General Secretariat (SEGIB) is the permanent support body to the Pro-Tempore Secretariat in the preparation of Ibero-American Summits. Founded in 2005 in replacement of the Secretariat of Ibero-American Cooperation, its main task is to assume the technical, institutional and administrative management and coordination of the Summits.

The creation of the SEGIB was approved in 2003, during the 13th Ibero-American Summit in Santa Cruz de la Sierra (Bolivia), with the first Secretary-General appointed later in 2005. The main headquarters are located in Madrid (Spain), while it also has three smaller offices in Mexico City (Mexico), Lima (Peru) and Montevideo (Uruguay). Spain assumes the majority of the financing, contributing around 60% of the budget.

Enrique V. Iglesias (2005–2014) and Rebeca Grynspan (2014–2021) are the two officials who have served as Secretary-General of the SEGIB.
