= Estrella Zeledón Lizano =

First Lady of Costa Rica (1929–2019)

First Lady of Costa Rica
- In role May 8, 1978 – May 8, 1982
- President: Rodrigo Carazo Odio
- Preceded by: Marjorie Elliott Sypher
- Succeeded by: Doris Yankelewitz Berger

Personal details
- Born: April 21, 1929 San José, Costa Rica
- Died: April 10, 2019 (aged 89) San José, Costa Rica
- Spouse: Rodrigo Carazo Odio (m. 1947–2009; his death)
- Children: 5, including Rodrigo Alberto Carazo Zeledón

Estrella Zeledón Lizano (April 21, 1929 – April 10, 2019) was a Costa Rican public figure who served as the First Lady of Costa Rica from 1978 to 1982 during the presidency of her husband, Rodrigo Carazo Odio. She also served on the Executive Council of the United Nations Educational, Scientific and Cultural Organization (UNESCO) from 1981 until 1985.

== Biography ==
Zeledón, the daughter of Jorge Zeledón Venegas and María Lizano Matamoros, was born in San José, Costa Rica, on April 21, 1929. She was the granddaughter of Saturnino Lizano Gutiérrez, who was briefly President of Costa Rica in 1882. She attended the Colegio Nuestra Señora de Sion in San José.

Zeledón married Rodrigo Carazo Odio at a ceremony in San José on April 16, 1947. The couple had five children: Rodrigo Alberto Carazo Zeledón, Mario Ernesto, Álvaro, Rolando Martin, and Jorge Manuel. Rolando died in a car accident in 1979 at the age of 26. Former President Rodrigo Carazo died in December 2009.

Estrella Zeledón Lizano died on April 10, 2019, 11 days before her 90th birthday. She was survived by four of her five children.
