= Signe Zeikate =

Latvian economist

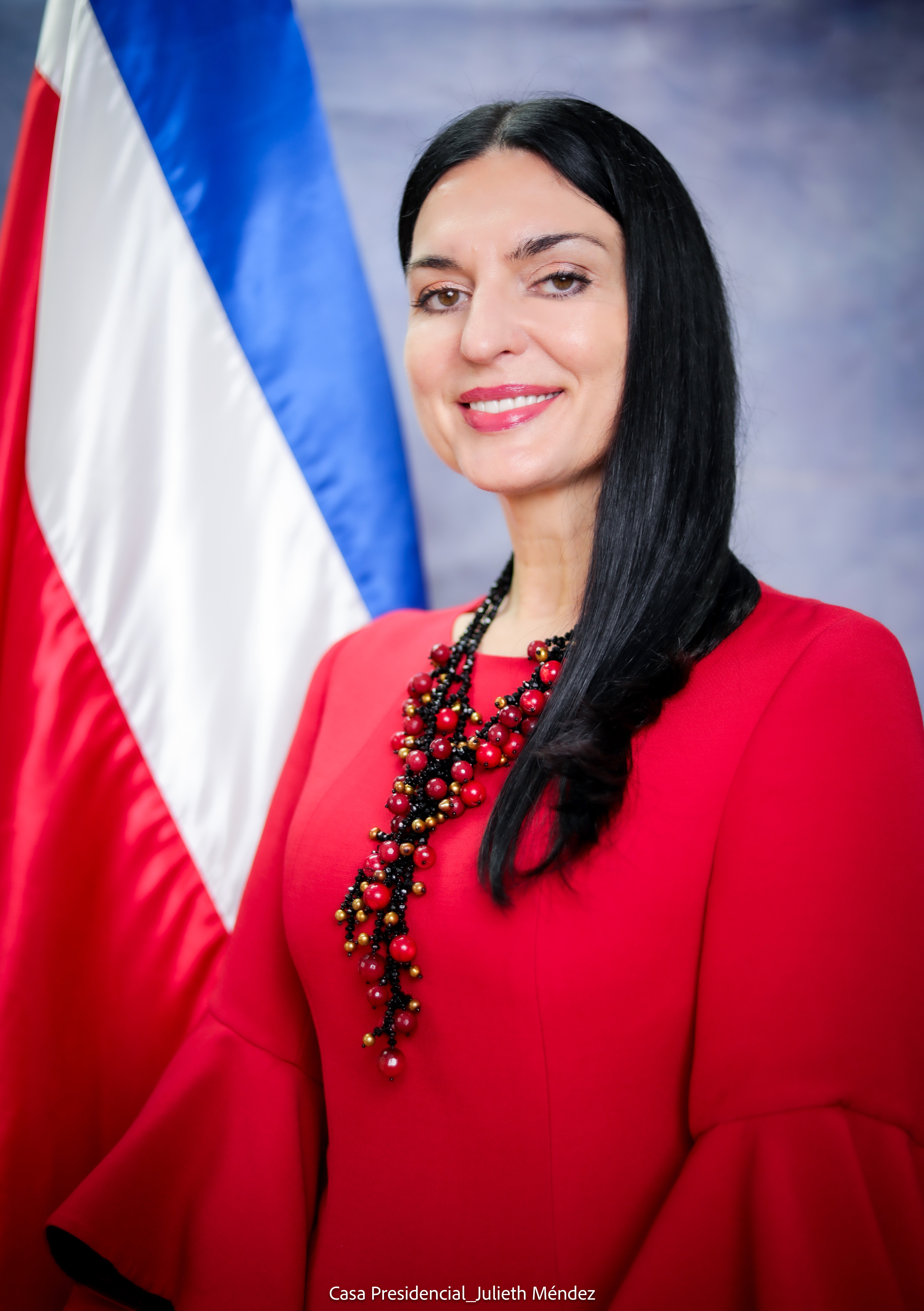
- Official portrait, 2024

First Lady of Costa Rica
- In role 8 May 2022 – 8 May 2026
- President: Rodrigo Chaves
- Preceded by: Claudia Dobles Camargo
- Succeeded by: Jeffrey Umaña Avendaño (as First Gentleman)

Personal details
- Born: February 2, 1972 (age 54) Riga, Soviet-occupied Latvia
- Party: Social Democratic Progress Party
- Spouse: Rodrigo Chaves (m. 2015)
- Children: Isabela Chaves Zeikate
- Education: University of Latvia
- Occupation: Economist

Signe Zeikate (born February 2, 1972) is a Latvian economist and was director of the "Programme for the Development of Poor Countries" of the World Bank. She served as the first lady of Costa Rica from 2022 to 2026, as she is the wife of President Rodrigo Chaves.

== Biography ==
Daughter of Gunars and Nina Zeikate. She has an older sister named Yolanta.

From the ages of 7 to 19, she practiced dancing. She was a national ballroom dance champion in her country in the late 1980s.

Zeikate earned a master's in economics from the University of Latvia and studied in the public policy doctoral program.

She was the head of the municipal finance department of the Latvian Ministry of Finance. She headed the unit that supervised and evaluated the financial viability of subnational governments and represented the Ministry of Finance on the State Subnational Debt and Guarantees Board.

She has written multiple research reports and prepared projects related to public finances.

In 2001, she received the Hubert Humphrey Honorary Fellowship from the United States Congress to study at the American University in Washington DC which allowed her to work for the World Bank in Washington. There, she met her future husband, who also worked at the World Bank.

Before settling in Costa Rica, the couple lived in Jakarta, Indonesia, for five years, where Chaves was director of one of the largest offices of the World Bank.

After more than 20 years working at the World Bank, she announced that she was resigning from her position to assume her role as first lady, from which she will focus her work on the planning and coordination of alliances that provide support for the comprehensive development of Costa Rican children and youth.

Zeikate assured that they would prioritize children from less advantaged backgrounds and areas with a higher incidence of poverty. The transversal theme will be gender equality and the empowerment of girls.

Through links with the Ministry of Education, the Ministry of Culture, and Youth, among others, the pillars of prioritization for the first lady are learning (English and technology), protection (coexistence and anti-bullying), recreation (culture and sports), and physical and mental health.
