= Lorena Clare Facio =

Costa Rican athlete and First Lady (1943–2026)

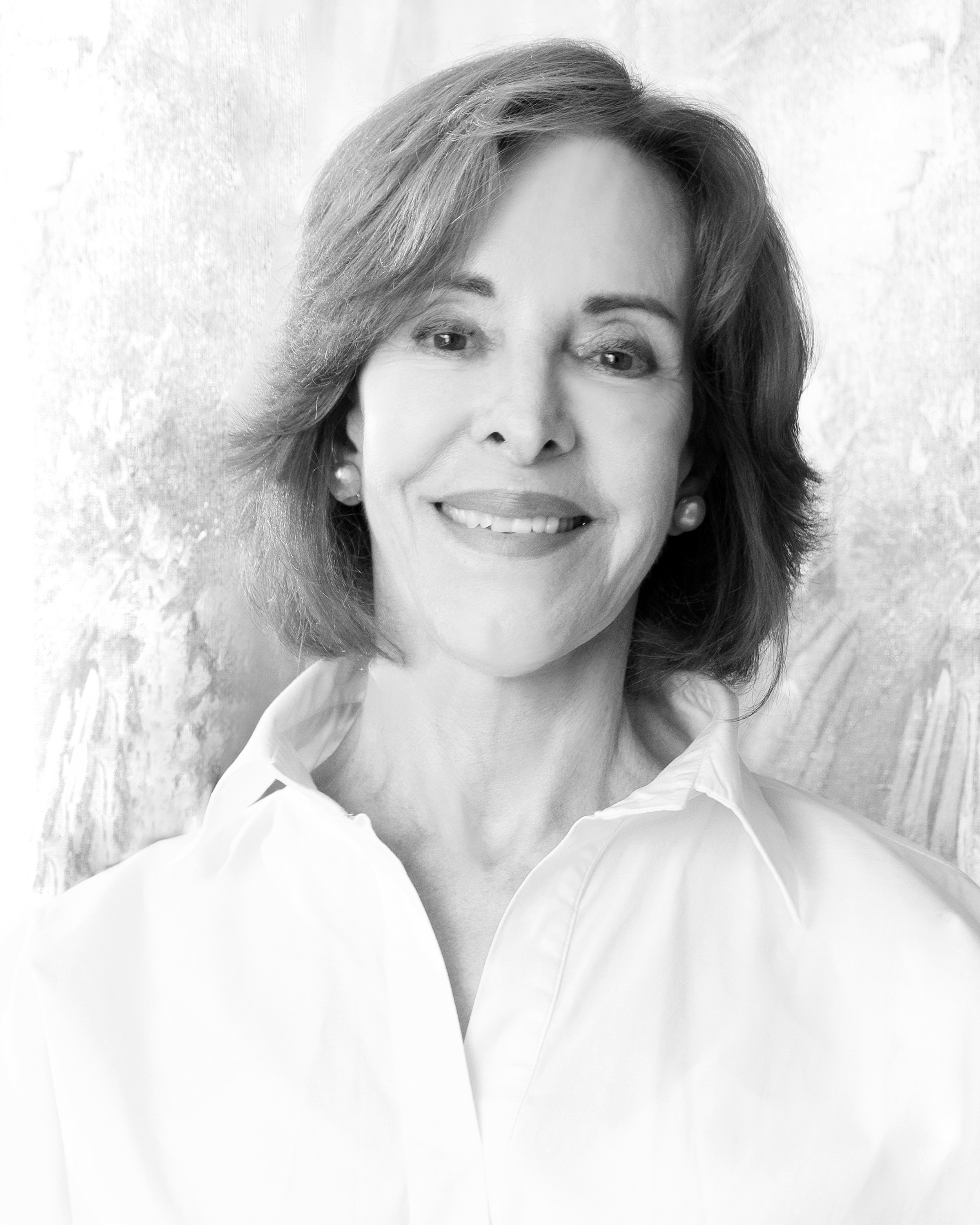

First Lady of Costa Rica
- In role May 8, 1998 – May 8, 2002
- President: Miguel Ángel Rodríguez
- Preceded by: Josette Altmann Borbón
- Succeeded by: Leila Rodríguez Stahl

Personal details
- Born: June 30, 1943 San José, Costa Rica
- Died: March 17, 2026 (aged 82) San José, Costa Rica
- Spouse: Miguel Ángel Rodríguez

Lorena Clare Facio (June 30, 1943 – March 17, 2026) was the First Lady of Costa Rica from 1998 to 2002 during the presidency of her husband Miguel Ángel Rodríguez Echeverría.

== Biography ==
Clare was born in San José, Costa Rica on June 30, 1943, to Manuel Emilio Clare and María Elena Facio. She was the only daughter and had three brothers. She concluded her secondary school education at the Colegio Nuestra Señora de Sión and left for France for a few years. After returning to Costa Rica, she began bilingual studies at Lincoln School.

She was known to be a skilled sportswoman and represented Costa Rica in dressage at the 1983 Pan American Games.

Clare married Miguel Ángel Rodríguez on December 14, 1962. She first met him as a teenager at a party in Barrio Aranjuez. They had three children.

During her time as First Lady, she supported projects benefiting older people and cancer patients, and was president of the Martín House of the Youth. She was part of the Social Christian Unity Party Planning Office.

Clare died from pancreatic cancer on March 17, 2026, at the age of 82.
