= Gloria Bejarano Almada =

Costa Rican politician

Member of the Legislative Assembly of Costa Rica
- In office May 1, 2010 – May 1, 2014
- Preceded by: Ana Helena Chacón Echeverría
- Succeeded by: Natalia Diaz Quintana

First Lady of Costa Rica
- In role May 8, 1990 – May 8, 1994
- President: Rafael Ángel Calderón Fournier
- Preceded by: Margarita Penón
- Succeeded by: Josette Altmann Borbón

Personal details
- Born: February 5, 1952 (age 74) Mexico City, Mexico
- Party: Social Christian Unity Party
- Spouse: Rafael Ángel Calderón Fournier (m. 1972)
- Children: Rafael Ángel; Gloria; María Gabriela; Marco Antonio
- Profession: Politician

Gloria Bejarano Almada (born February 5, 1952 Mexico City) is a Mexican-born Costa Rican politician, public figure and former First Lady of Costa Rica. Bejarano, the wife of former Costa Rican President Rafael Ángel Calderón Fournier, served as the country's First Lady from 1990 until 1994.

== Biography ==
Bejarano married her husband on February 25, 1975. During her tenure as First Lady, she led efforts to found the Costa Rican Center of Science and Culture, which opened in a former prison on April 27, 1994. The Center contains the Museo de los Niños, the National Gallery and the National Auditorium.

Bejarano, a member of the Social Christian Unity Party (PUSC), was elected to the Legislative Assembly of Costa Rica from the 16th legislative district of San Jose in the 2010 general election. She served in the Legislative Assembly from 2010 to 2014.

Gloria Bejarano Almada, who was born in Mexico City, is the daughter of the late Mexican physician and politician, Armando León Bejarano, the former Governor of Morelos from 1976 to 1982. There is a neighborhood named for her in Jardines de Ahuatepec, Cuernavaca, Morelos (postal code 62304).

Honorary titles
Preceded by Margarita Penón	First Lady of Costa Rica; 1990–1994	Succeeded by Josette Altmann Borbón
