= Margarita Penón =

Costa Rican politician (born 1948)

Margarita Penón Góngora
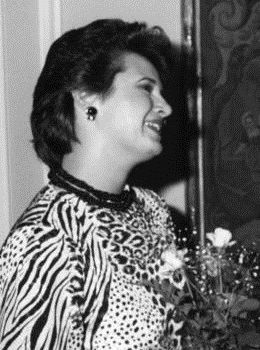

Member of the Legislative Assembly of Costa Rica
- In office 2002–2005
- Preceded by: Vanessa de Paul Castro Mora
- Succeeded by: Teresita Aguilar Mirambell

First Lady of Costa Rica
- In role May 8, 1986 – May 8, 1990
- President: Óscar Arias
- Preceded by: Doris Yankelewitz Berger
- Succeeded by: Gloria Bejarano Almada

Personal details
- Born: October 11, 1948 (age 77) San José, Costa Rica
- Party: Citizens' Action Party (since 2000)
- Other political affiliations: National Liberation Party (until 2000)
- Spouse: Óscar Arias (m. 1973; div. 1996)
- Children: 2
- Education: Vassar College
- Profession: Politician

Margarita Penón Góngora (born October 11, 1948) is a Costa Rican politician. She was the First Lady of Costa Rica from 1986-1990, as well as an advocate and promoter of the landmark gender equality law passed in 1990. She ran for the presidential nomination in 1993 and served in the Legislative Assembly between 2002 and 2005. She currently represents Costa Rica on the board of directors of the Central American Bank for Economic Integration.

== Background ==
She was born into a family belonging to the Creole aristocracy of Costa Rica. Her parents were Eugenio Penón Ferrer and Margarita Góngora Hernández. After attending primary and middle school in Costa Rica, she was educated in the United States, graduating from Pius XI Catholic High School in Milwaukee, Wisconsin and Vassar College, with a bachelor's degree in chemistry.

She married Óscar Arias Sánchez in San Francisco de Heredia, Costa Rica, in 1973. Arias Sánchez would go on to serve two terms as president of Costa Rica (1986-1990 and 2006-2010) and receive the Nobel Peace Prize in 1987.

== Political career ==
Her main focus as First Lady was to advance gender equality. She was instrumental in the passage of the 1990 Act for Promoting the Social Equality of Women, which bettered conditions for women in areas such as property rights, employment, and domestic violence law. She also participated in social welfare work, the preservation of national traditions, environmental causes, the establishment of parks in rural communities, anti-drug work, and the prevention of violence against children.

She took part in her husband's efforts to promote peace in Central America and accompanied him on many of his official trips abroad. She was the first president of the Arias Foundation for Peace and Human Progress, which was founded with the money awarded to Arias Sánchez as part of the Nobel Prize. She has been an advisor to the Secretary-General of the United Nations and to various important foundations.

In 1993 she became the first woman in Costa Rica to run for the presidential nomination, as a member of the National Liberation Party. Her campaign opened up new possibilities for women in the political arena. Penón Góngora left the party in 2001 to join the Citizens’ Action Party.

She was elected to the Legislative Assembly in 2002 and was president of the Women's Committee, secretary of the Budgetary Committee, and member of the Second Committee with Full Legislative Authority and of the Fiscal Agreement Special Joint Committee. She divorced Arias Sánchez in 2005 and resigned from the Legislative Assembly soon after he announced his intention to seek the presidency a second time. In the 2014 elections she gave her support to the Citizens’ Action Party candidate, Luis Guillermo Solís, who was elected to the presidency. Solís appointed Penón Góngora the representative of Costa Rica to the Central American Bank for Economic Integration.
