= Gerónima Montealegre =

- Born: Gerónima Montealegre Fernández; October 30, 1823; San José, Costa Rica
- Died: September 16, 1892 (aged 68); San José, Costa Rica
- Known for: First Lady of Costa Rica and philanthropist
- Spouse: Bruno Carranza
- Parent(s): Mariano Montealegre Bustamante and Jerónima Fernández Chacón
- Relatives: José María Montealegre Fernández (brother)

Gerónima Montealegre Fernández de Carranza Ramírez (October 30, 1823 - September 16, 1892) was First Lady of Costa Rica and wife of Temporary Head of State Bruno Carranza. She was born in San José on October 30, 1823 to her parents Mariano Montealegre Bustamante (Costa Rica's first Vice Head of State and diplomat) and Jerónima Fernández Chacón, and was sister of President José María Montealegre Fernández. She married Carranza on January 3, 1847 and later became First Lady when he took power by coup d'etat from April 27 to August 8, 1870.

Using her mother's inheritance, she and her sisters founded Hospicio de la Trinidad, the first orphanage in the city of San José. She died in this city on September 16, 1892. At the time of her death the local press nicknamed her "mother of the orphans and the handicapped" (in Spanish "madre de los huérfanos y los desvalidos").

She was the great-great-grandmother of actress Madeleine Stowe.
