= Rafael Ángel Calderón Fournier =

President of Costa Rica from 1990 to 1994

Rafael Ángel Calderón Fournier MROU OYC
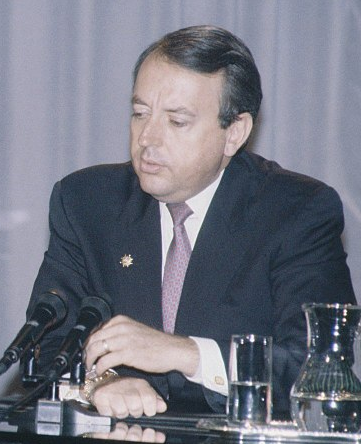
- Calderón in 1993

41st President of Costa Rica
- In office 8 May 1990 – 8 May 1994
- Vice President: Germán Serrano Pinto; Arnoldo López Echandi
- Preceded by: Óscar Arias Sánchez
- Succeeded by: José María Figueres Olsen

Minister of Foreign Affairs
- In office 8 May 1978 – 31 July 1980
- President: Rodrigo Carazo Odio
- Preceded by: Gonzalo Facio Segreda
- Succeeded by: Bernd H. Niehaus Quesada

Deputy of the Legislative Assembly of Costa Rica
- In office 1 May 1974 – 30 April 1978
- Preceded by: Longino Soto Pacheco
- Succeeded by: Marta Chinchilla Orozco
- Constituency: San José (11th Office)

Personal details
- Born: 14 March 1949 (age 77) Diriamba, Nicaragua
- Party: PRSC (since 2014)
- Other political affiliations: PUSC (1983–2014); Unity Coalition (1976–1983); UN (1965–1975)
- Spouse: Gloria Bejarano Almada (m. 1972)
- Children: 4
- Parent(s): Rafael Ángel Calderón Guardia; María Rosario Fournier Mora
- Relatives: Francisco Calderón Guardia (uncle)
- Education: University of Costa Rica (LLB)
- Occupation: Lawyer; politician; businessman
- Profession: Lawyer
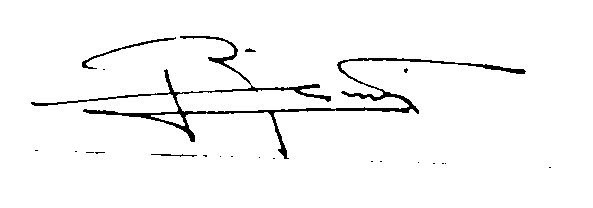
- Signature

Rafael Ángel Calderón Fournier (born 14 March 1949) is a Costa Rican lawyer and politician who served as the 41st President of Costa Rica from 1990 to 1994. He was the presidential candidate of the Social Christian Unity Party for the national elections held in February 2010, but he left the race on 5 October 2009, when he was sentenced to five years in prison for two counts of corruption.

== Family life ==
Rafael Ángel Calderón Fournier was born in Diriamba, Nicaragua, on March 14th, 1949. His father was Rafael Ángel Calderón Guardia, who served as president from 1940 to 1944. His mother was Maria del Rosario Fournier Mora. He was born while his parents were in exile.

Calderon Fournier is married to Gloria Bejarano Almada, the daughter of Mexican physician and politician, Armando León Bejarano. They have four children: Rafael Ángel, Gloria del Carmen, María Gabriela and Marco Antonio. They also have six grandchildren: Alex, Gloria, Tomás, Felipe, Rafael Ángel and Karolina. Calderon Fournier's eldest sister, Alejandra, a trotskyist leader, died in an accident in 1979, at the age of 25.

== Education ==
Calderon started his primary education at the Colegio Mexico, led by Marist Fathers, in Mexico City. Calderón Fournier returned to Costa Rica in 1958, when he was nine years old. Mario Echandi Jiménez (president 1958–1962) was elected that year and he allowed the return of political exiles, including former president Calderon Guardia.

He attended his secondary education at the Colegio La Salle in San José, Costa Rica. Calderón Fournier studied law at the University of Costa Rica.

== Political life ==
Calderon Fournier was elected secretary of secondary education issues of the Partido Unificacion Nacional (PUN). At 20 he was elected President of the Youth of the PUN. Shortly after the death of his father in 1970, he was appointed to the board of the Caja Costarricense de Seguro Social. In that capacity he participated in the drafting of the new regulations of the retirement systems of the country.

He was elected congressman in 1974 and served for two consecutive terms as chairman of the Committee on Social Affairs. Among other important bills, the committee adopted the Law on Social Development and Family Allowances, which gave the country a non-contributory pension scheme, which now covers more than a hundred thousand elderly.

In 1991 he received an honorary doctorate from the University of Houston.

Born in Diriamba, Nicaragua, on 14 March 1949, he was the son of Dr. Rafael Angel Calderon Guardia, former President of the Republic, who was in exile in that country because of the civil war in 1948. In 1958 he returned to Costa Rica, once President Mario Echandi lifted his father's exile. Calderon quickly climbed the ranks within the party, which in later years became the Social Christian Unity Party. In 1982 he was a presidential candidate and was defeated by Luis Alberto Monge Alvarez. In 1986 he tries again, but is defeated again, this time by Oscar Arias Sanchez. Without thinking twice, he throws back a presidential candidate in the 1990 elections, and was elected. Like his father, came to power at age 40 and took exactly 50 years after he had Calderon Guardia. During his government initiated a reform of the State of Costa Rica. He promoted a liberal policy in all economic, making fiscal reforms, trade and finance that gave greater economic stability to the country. Increased the cost of all utilities, fuel and taxes. Reduced the number of public employees, through the system of labor mobility and limited bank lending. Increased production and exports. Increased entry of international currencies. Tourism, mainly ecological, experienced an unprecedented boom, so much, which placed this activity in the first place as a producer of foreign exchange, surpassing bananas and coffee. He converted the old Central Prison in the Children's Museum, a modern and attractive, visited daily by hundreds of children and adults. Eliminated most tax and customs exemptions industrial awards, to remove privileges and vested interests for generations. Modified public pensions to make them more fair. Cedulación enacted the indigenous and introduced reforms to the Labour Code. Inflation stabilized, liberalized and controlled the exchange rate of the dollar and revalued the currency, stocks that attracted more investments to the country. Granted a free voucher housing that benefited low-income families, but the social sector (health, education and public safety), suffered a deterioration. Liberal economic policy was what characterized his government. It was a great president bargaining.

Main achievements of his government

- Continue with housing projects.
- Created the Children's Museum.
- Built several parks in coordination with the City of San José.
- Began labor mobility programs.
- Encouraged the creation of community homes for the care of children of working mothers.
- Signed the Free Trade Agreement with Mexico.
- Initiated the government reform program

== Involvement in corruption scandals, trial and sentence ==
Calderón on election night in 1990 upon winning the presidential election

After an alleged corruption scandal he was incarcerated in October 2004. He was released from jail and was placed under house arrest.

Calderon Fornier was accused of receiving money from the Finnish firm Instrumentarium in exchange of contracts for the firm with the Caja Costarricense del Seguro Social (CCSS). His trial started on 3 November 2008, and the hearings finished in September 2009. In spite of the charges, he officially announced his candidacy for the Presidency of Costa Rica in the 2010 elections. On 5 October 2009 Calderón was sentenced to five years in prison. He walked out of the courtroom and notified the press that he would appeal the sentence and that he was not running for president in order to focus on his appeal.

Calderon Fournier's co-defendants received varied sentences. Walter Reiche (an executive from Costa Rican firm Corporación Fischel) was sentenced to serve four years of prison. Eliseo Vargas García, former CEO of CCSS was sentenced to serve a five-year term in prison. Gerardo Bolaños Alpízar, a former member of the CCSS board was sentenced to three and a half years in prison; the same sentence as Juan Carlos Sánchez Arguedas, an executive of CCSS, and Marvin Barrantes, CEO of Corporación Fischel.

On 11 May 2011 Calderon Fournier's appeal was rejected by the tribunal (the so-called Sala III). The judges confirmed the previous sentence. However, they reduced the term to serve in prison from five years to three. According to the Costa Rican law, he can be expected not to serve this time in prison. Calderon's wife, Mrs. Gloria Bejarano Almada, who currently serves as a deputy at the Asamblea Legislativa (congress of the country) and who is a member of the parliament's directorate, was sentenced to pay US$70,000 to the Costa Rican government for her participation in the scandal. According to the ruling, Mrs. Bejarano Almada obtained an economic profit in the scandal. On 13 April, the Costa Rican newspaper La Nación informed that Finland's attorney general will press charges against three executives from the Finnish firm Instrumentarium. The three executives will be charged of crimes connected with corruption and fraud related to a loan of $39.5 million granted by the Finnish government to the Caja Costarricense de Seguro Social (the Costa Rican agency in charge of public hospitals) and intended to finance the purchase of medical equipment. According to the Finnish attorney general, the accused executives, who worked for Instrumentarium Medko Medical, later acquired by General Electric, distributed a total of $8.7 million to Costa Rican partners and public servants in kick-backs. The attorney general believes that the trial could begin by September, 2012 and that a sentence would be pronounced early 2013.

Political offices
Preceded by Óscar Arias	President of Costa Rica; 1990–1994	Succeeded by José María Figueres
