= Mercedes Peñas Domingo =

Spanish-Costa Rican politician scientist

First Lady of Costa Rica
- In role May 8, 2014 – May 8, 2018
- President: Luis Guillermo Solís
- Preceded by: José María Rico
- Succeeded by: Claudia Dobles Camargo

Personal details
- Born: November 18, 1968 (age 57) Madrid, Spain
- Domestic partner: Luis Guillermo Solís (2006–present)
- Education: Universidad Complutense de Madrid; University for Peace
- Profession: Political scientist

María Mercedes Peñas Domingo (born November 18, 1968) is a Spanish–Costa Rican political scientist and specialist in international development in Latin America. Peñas held the position of First Lady of Costa Rica from May 8, 2014 to May 8, 2018, as the partner of former Costa Rican President Luis Guillermo Solís.

== Biography ==
Peñas was born in Madrid, Spain, on November 18, 1968. She first visited Costa Rica in August 1991 to attend the University for Peace (UPEACE), where she obtained a master's degree in International Relations, Peace, and Development Cooperation.

Peñas spent two years studying at UPEACE in Costa Rica before returning to Spain after completing her master's degree. Two years later, she returned to Costa Rica to work at the Inter-American Institute for Cooperation on Agriculture's (IICA) Department of External Affairs. Additionally, she has worked as a consultant for the Rainforest Alliance, the European Union and the United Nations.

Peñas has worked for DEMUCA, the financial branch of the Spanish Agency for International Development Cooperation (AECID), since 1997. She is now a naturalized citizen of Costa Rica.

Peñas kept a low profile during much of the 2014 presidential election. She and Luis Guillermo Solís, the then-candidate of the Citizens' Action Party, made their first joint appearance at a press conference on March 8, 2014, to discuss Johnny Araya Monge, Solis' opponent who had dropped out of the campaign.

Mercedes Peñas Domingo became First Lady of Costa Rica on May 8, 2014, when Solis was inaugurated President. She succeeded José María Rico, the outgoing First Gentleman of Costa Rica. On her Facebook, Peñas describes herself as "Mujer, madre, compañera y Primera Dama de la República de Costa Rica" (Woman, mother, companion and First Lady of the Republic of Costa Rica).

Peñas accompanied her husband on her first official visit to her native Spain on March 17 and 18, 2015.

== Personal life ==
Peñas met Luis Guillermo Solís while studying for her master's at the University for Peace and have dated since 2006. They live under civil partnership and have one daughter, Inés Solís Peñas. Solís has five children from his previous marriage to Nancy Richards.
