= Doris Yankelewitz Berger =

First Lady of Costa Rica
- In role May 8, 1982 – May 8, 1986
- President: Luis Alberto Monge
- Preceded by: Estrella Zeledón Lizano
- Succeeded by: Margarita Penón

Personal details
- Born: May 7, 1934 San José, Costa Rica
- Died: May 18, 2016 (aged 82) San José, Costa Rica
- Party: National Liberation Party
- Spouse: Luis Alberto Monge (m. 1965; div. 1988)
- Profession: Artist, politician

Doris Yankelewitz Berger (May 7, 1934 – May 18, 2016) was a Costa Rican artist, politician, political activist, and member of the National Liberation Party (PLN). She served as the First Lady of Costa Rica from 1982 to 1986 during the presidency of her then-husband, President Luis Alberto Monge. She was the nation's first Jewish First Lady.

== Biography ==
=== Early life ===
Yankelewitz was born to Jewish parents on May 7, 1934, in San José, Costa Rica. Her mother, Rosita Berger Spiro, was British, while her father, Jorge Yankelewitz Rodstein, was from Argentina. She had two brothers, Samuel and Daniel. Yankelewitz picked up her interest in the arts as a child. She took piano lessons and learned oil painting, which would become her focus as an artist.

She attended secondary school at the Methodist School of Costa Rica (Colegio Metodista) in San José. Yankelewitz received her Bachelor of Fine Arts from the University of Costa Rica in 1966.

Yankelewitz met her future husband, Luis Alberto Monge, at a luncheon while she was studying at the University of Costa Rica. Monge was serving as Costa Rica's first Ambassador to Israel (1963–1966) at the time of their first meeting. They soon began dating. Monge and Yankelewitz married on November 25, 1965, at a ceremony held in San José. She was 31-years old, while he was 39-years old at the time of their wedding. The couple had one daughter, Lena.

=== Politics and First Lady of Costa Rica ===
Yankelewitz became active in the women's wing of the National Liberation Party (PLN) beginning in the 1970s. She went on to chair the national women's committee of the PLN for six years. Under Yankelewitz, the women's committee established local branches throughout Costa Rica.

Luis Alberto Monge ran for President of Costa Rica in 1978, but lost the election to Rodrigo Carazo Odio. Yankelewitz was heavily involved in the 1978 election and campaigned on behalf of her husband. Four years later, Monge again ran for President in the 1982 general election. This time, he was elected President by more than 25 points. Doris Yankelewitz Berger became First Lady of Costa Rica on May 8, 1982, the day her husband was sworn in as President of Costa Rica. She became the first Jew to serve as the country's First Lady in history.

Yankelewitz initially planned to focus on tourism in Costa Rica during her tenure as First Lady. However, she soon switched to other issues, including the arts, substance abuse, and healthcare. In 1984, First Lady Yankelewitz founded the Costan Rican chapter of Hogares CREA to battle treat drug addiction among young people. She also helped to open the Center for the Rehabilitation of Alcoholics (Centro para la Rehabilitación de Alcohólicos), a clinic focusing on alcoholism. Additionally, she sponsored a number of healthcare and community organizations, including the Hospital San Juan de Dios in San José and the Red Cross. Owing to her background in the arts, Yankelewitz established two artistic institutions, the Casa de la Cultura de Puntarenas and the Artesanías de Sarchí (Sarchí Craft Market).

The Consejo Nacional de las Mujeres (National Council of Women) of Mexico honored Yankelewitz as a "Dama de América" (Lady of America) in November 1982. In October 1984, Juan Carlos I of Spain awarded Yankelewitz the Order of Isabella the Catholic.

Yankelewitz and Luis Alberto Monge separated at the end of his presidency in 1986. They divorced in June 1988, two years after leaving office.

Doris Yankelewitz Berger, who had been ill for several months, died on May 18, 2016, at the age of 82.

Honorary titles
Preceded by Estrella Zeledón Lizano	First Lady of Costa Rica; 1982–1986	Succeeded by Margarita Penón
