= Armando León Bejarano =

Mexican orthopedic surgeon and politician

Governor of Morelos
- In office May 1976 – 1982
- Preceded by: Felipe Rivera Crespo
- Succeeded by: Lauro Ortega Martínez

Personal details
- Born: Armando León Bejarano Valadez; April 11, 1916 Cuautla, Morelos, Mexico
- Died: July 6, 2016 (aged 100) Cuernavaca, Morelos, Mexico
- Party: PRI
- Spouse: Gloria Almada de los Ríos
- Children: Armando Bejarano Almada Gloria Bejarano Almada María de Lourdes Bejarano Almada
- Education: UNAM

Armando León Bejarano Valadez (April 11, 1916 – July 6, 2016) was a Mexican orthopedic surgeon, physician, politician, and member of the Institutional Revolutionary Party (PRI). He served as the Governor of Morelos from 1976 until 1982.

Bejarano was born in Cuautla, Morelos, on April 11, 1916, to Jesús Bejarano Nuñez and Carmen Marcia Valadez Lizarraga. He was the youngest of his brothers. Bajarano studied at the medical school of the National Autonomous University of Mexico (UNAM) from 1933 to 1938 and received his degree on July 18, 1939, becoming a surgeon and midwife. He specialized in orthopedics and trauma.

Bejaranos was the medical director of the Olympic Village during the 1968 Summer Olympics in Mexico City.

Bejarano was appointed the PRI candidate for Governor of Morelos to succeed outgoing Governor Felipe Rivera Crespo. His candidacy proved controversial, as Bejarano had no political experience in Morelos at the time. Bejarano's friendship and connections with then-President of Mexico José López Portillo allowed him to jump from a position at the Office of Food and Beverages at the federal Secretariat of Health directly to the gubernatorial candidacy of Morelos state without opposition. Bejarano, a candidate for the governing PRI, was elected Governor and served in that office May 1976 until 1982. He was succeeded by Lauro Ortega Martínez, a former President of PRI.

Bejarano later served as a judge within the Morela state judiciary.

Armando León Bejarano died at his home in Cuernavaca, Morelos, on July 6, 2016, at the age of 100 due to old age. His survivors are his son and daughters Armando Berjarano Almada, Gloria Bejarano Almada and María de Lourdes Bejarano Almada
