= 1870 Costa Rican coup d'état =

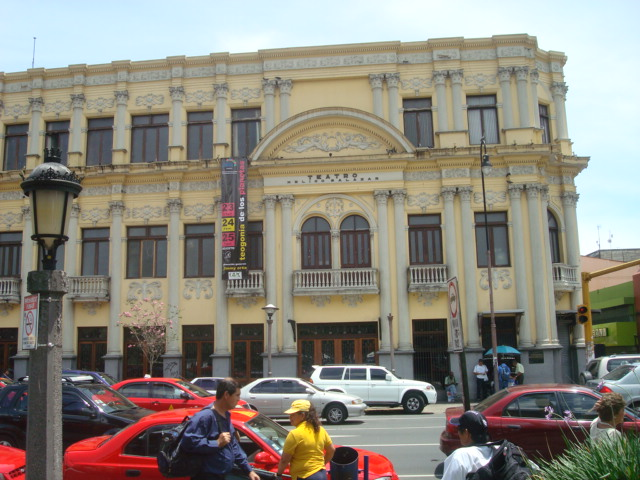
The Army Headquarters were located in what is today the Melico Salazar Theatre.

The coup d'état of April 27, 1870 in Costa Rica was a coup implemented by the military leadership led by Tomás Guardia Gutiérrez and it established, to a large extent, the inauguration of the Liberal State. It also enacted the Costa Rican Constitution of 1871, the longest in Costa Rican history as it remained in force until 1948.

The coup overthrew the de facto president Jesús Jiménez Zamora and was originally set by former president José María Montealegre Fernández, who aspired the return to power by force. A group of soldiers led by the Guardia clandestinely entered the Army Headquarters, then see of the army and took control of it. However, Guardia did not hand over power to Montealegre but to Bruno Carranza who soon afterwards resigns and the Guardia-dominated Congress appoints Guardia directly. Guardia was very popular among the military, especially for his heroic performance in the Filibuster War.

While Montealegre and Jiménez both belonged to the group of antimoristas who had overthrown and executed the hero of the Filibuster War, Juan Rafael Mora Porras, as well as sought to erase his memory of Costa Rican history, Guardia on the contrary had been Morista himself and after the coup he took enormous efforts to connect his own figure and government with that of Mora.

Guard did not belong to the powerful Costa Rican coffee oligarchy, a political elite that had ruled continuously until then. His power was maintained only by the loyal support he had of the troops. Immediately after the coup, Guardia would convene a Constituent Assembly that drafted a new constitution, highly progressive for the time and with strong liberal roots. He abolished the death penalty and torture, "desoligarquized" the political system and carried out many infrastructure works.

The date of the coup was commemorated every year under his regime using music bands that roamed the country, with civic acts in the municipal councils of each provincial capital, military parades, a mass and banquet. Guard would rule as strong man of the country directly or through front men until his death in 1882.
