= Arnoldo Herrera =

Costa Rican swimmer (born 1996)

Personal information
- Full name: Arnoldo Felipe Herrera Portuguez
- Born: 7 March 1996 (age 30) Cartago, Costa Rica

Sport
- Sport: Swimming
- College team: Northern Michigan Wildcats

Arnoldo Felipe Herrera Portuguez (born 7 March 1996) is a Costa Rican swimmer. He competed in the men's 100 metre breaststroke event at the 2017 World Aquatics Championships. In 2019, he represented Costa Rica at the 2019 World Aquatics Championships held in Gwangju, South Korea. He competed at the 2020 Summer Olympics.
