= Arnoldo López Echandi =

Second Vice President of Costa Rica

Arnoldo López Echandi (born 5 May 1941) is a politician who served as Second Vice President of Costa Rica and Ambassador of Costa Rica to France. He also served as President of International Coffee Organization.

He was a member of the Social Christian Unity Party.
