= Francisco Montealegre Fernández =

Costa Rican businessman and politician (1818–1875)

First Designate to the Presidency
- In office 8 May 1860 – 8 May 1861
- President: José María Montealegre Fernández
- Preceded by: Position established
- Succeeded by: Jesús Jiménez Zamora

Personal details
- Born: Francisco Montealegre Fernández; 1818 San José, Province of Costa Rica, Captaincy General of Guatemala, Spanish Empire
- Died: 1875 (aged 56–57) San José, Costa Rica
- Party: Independent

Francisco Montealegre Fernández (1818–1875) was a Costa Rican politician and businessman who served as First Designate to the Presidency from 1860 to 1861.
