= Bruno Carranza =

President of Costa Rica in 1870

Bruno Carranza Ramírez
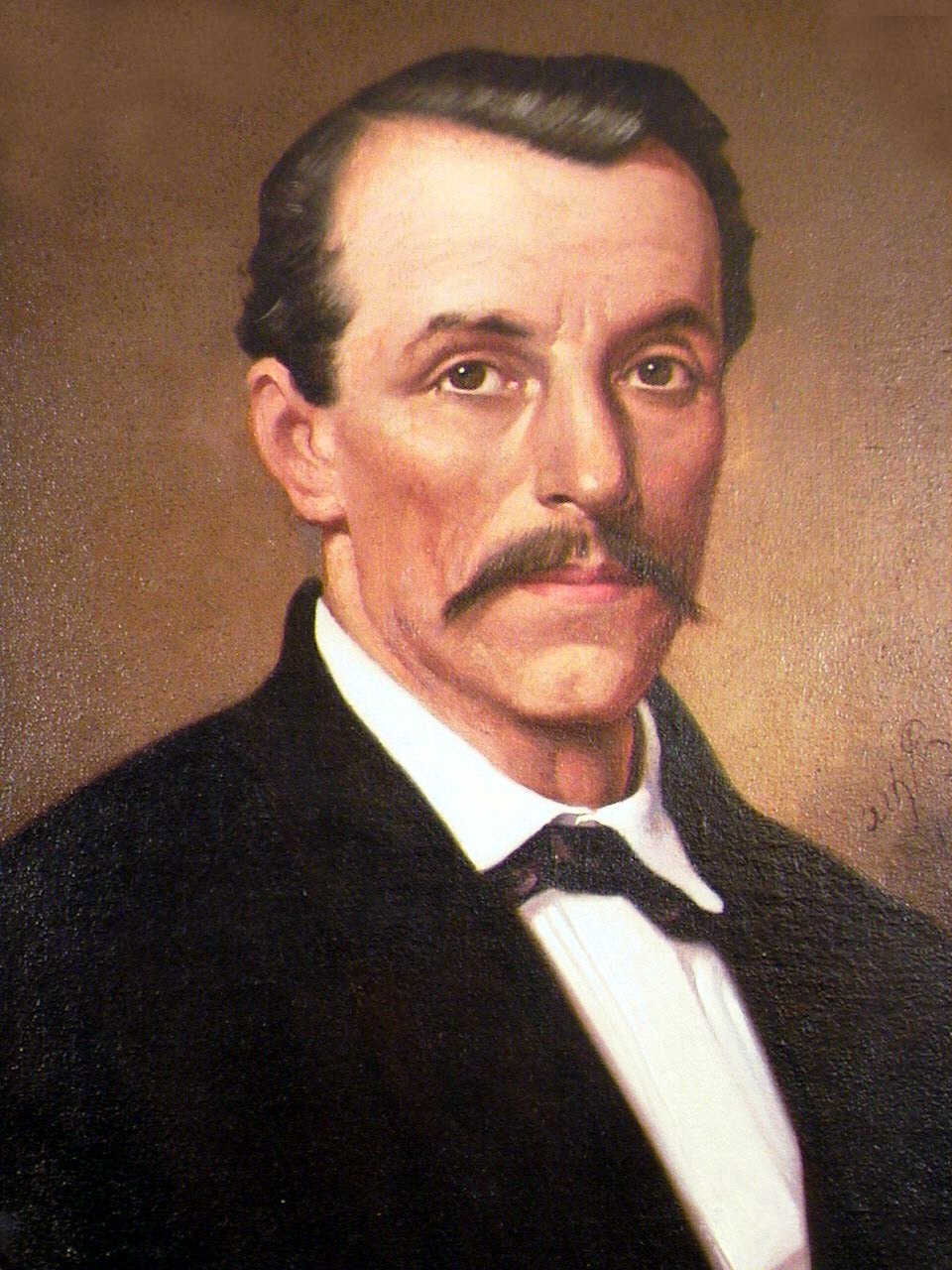

7th President of Costa Rica
- In office 27 April 1870 – 8 August 1870
- Preceded by: Jesús Jiménez Zamora
- Succeeded by: Tomás Guardia Gutiérrez

Deputy of the Congress of the Republic for San José
- In office 1 May 1852 – 30 April 1858

Personal details
- Born: José Bruno Carranza Ramírez; 5 October 1822 San José, Costa Rica, First Mexican Empire
- Died: 25 January 1891 (aged 68) San José, Costa Rica
- Party: Independent
- Spouse: Gerónima Montealegre Fernández (m. 1846)
- Relations: José María Montealegre Fernández (brother-in-law)
- Parent(s): Miguel Carranza Fernández; Joaquina Ramírez y García
- Education: Universidad de San Carlos de Guatemala (MBBS)

José Bruno Carranza Ramírez (5 October 1822 – 25 January 1891) was a Costa Rican physician, journalist and politician who served as the 7th President of Costa Rica from April to August 1870. Appointed with the title of Temporary Head of the Republic, he came to power in the coup d'état of 27 April 1870 that deposed President Jesús Jiménez. He resigned three months later under military pressure by General Tomas Guardia Gutierrez.

His parents were Miguel Carranza Fernández (Vice-Head of State between 1838 and 1841) and Joaquina Ramírez y García. In 1847 he married Gerónima Montealegre, sister of President José María Montealegre Fernández. His great-great-granddaughter is actress Madeleine Stowe.

== Studies and career ==
Carranza graduated in medicine from the University of San Carlos in Guatemala.

After returning to Costa Rica he practiced both privately and in the State-run Hospital San Juan de Dios. He was inspector general of vaccinations and proto-medicines. He served in Nicaragua as a military doctor during the 1856 Campaign against William Walker, but had to return almost immediately due to a Costa Rican Army retreat and a cholera epidemic.

He also worked as a journalist, publishing several newsletters and newspapers such as El Álbum ("The Album") and La Estrella del Irazú ("The Irazú Star"). He was also active in other diverse economic and commercial ventures, and among other businesses, he owned coffee plantations, a book store, and a boutique. From 1855 to 1859 he was awarded the administration of the National Liquor Factory and thus became the only official State supplier of alcohol.

== Public office ==
He was deputy for several periods under the Mora Porras administration. He became the Costa Rican ambassador to El Salvador in 1857. He represented San José in the Constituent Assembly of 1869, although he stepped down soon after his election. Politically he was considered a liberal, sometimes even anti-clerical, and was exiled more than once because of his political beliefs.

The coup d'état of 27 April 1870 turned him into the head of state with the official title of Temporary Head of the Republic (in Spanish Jefe Provisorio de la República). During his administration the district of Limón was created, laws outlining personal and religious freedoms were dictated, and a law of guarantees was passed which for the first time in the country's history banned the death penalty. The so-called Secretarías de Estado were also regulated and new elections for a Constituent Assembly were held.

The principal figure in his administration and author of his policies towards external relations and freedom of creed was the Guatemalan lawyer Lorenzo Montúfar y Rivera, noted advocated of anti-clericalism. Other notable Secretaries of State during his time in office were Joaquín Lizano Gutiérrez (government, police, justice, agriculture, and industry), Rafael Gallegos Sáenz (housing and commerce), and Buenaventura Carazo Alvarado (war, navy, and public works).

Due to differences with Tomás Guardia Gutiérrez on August 8, 1870, he presented his resignation to the Constituent Assembly, which was accepted the next day on August 9. General Guardia succeeded him.

He was later a member of the Grand National Counsel and Plenipotentiary Minister of Costa Rica in El Salvador, where he signed the Carranza-Arbizú Accord.

Political offices
| Preceded by Jesús Jiménez Zamora | President of Costa Rica; 1870 | Succeeded by Tomás Guardia Gutiérrez |
