= Marie Meza =

Costa Rican swimmer (born 1990)

Personal information
- Born: November 20, 1990 (age 35) San José, Costa Rica

Sport
- Sport: Swimming
- Strokes: Butterfly

Marie Laura Meza (born 20 November 1990) is a Costa Rican swimmer who competes in the women's 100 metre butterfly. At the 2012 Summer Olympics she finished 42nd (last) overall in the heats in the Women's 100 metre butterfly and failed to reach the final.

She also competed at the 2015 Pan American Games and the 2016 Summer Olympics.
