= Costa Rica at the 2011 World Aquatics Championships =

Sporting event delegation

Flag of Costa Rica

Costa Rica competed at the 2011 World Aquatics Championships in Shanghai, China between July 16 and 31, 2011.

== Open water swimming ==
Men

Athlete	Event	Final	
Athlete	Event	Time	Position
Jeffry Villalobos	Men's 5km	1:10:06.1	49
Jeffry Villalobos	Men's 10km	OTL	
Rodolfo Sanchez	Men's 5km	1:08.16.4	46
Rodolfo Sanchez	Men's 10km	DNS	

== Swimming ==
Costa Rica qualified 3 swimmers.

Men

Athlete	Event	Heats		Semifinals		Final	
Athlete	Event	Time	Rank	Time	Rank	Time	Rank
Jose Montoya	Men's 50m Freestyle	24.12	48	did not advance			
Jose Montoya	Men's 100m Freestyle	52.96	60	did not advance			
Mario Montoya	Men's 200m Freestyle	1:52.64	43	did not advance			
Mario Montoya	Men's 400m Freestyle	4:00.88	34			did not advance	

Women

Athlete	Event	Heats		Semifinals		Final	
Athlete	Event	Time	Rank	Time	Rank	Time	Rank
Marie Laura Meza	Women's 100m Butterfly	1:05.05	42	did not advance			
Marie Laura Meza	Women's 200m Butterfly	2:23.68	32	did not advance			

== Synchronised swimming ==
Costa Rica has qualified 3 athletes in synchronised swimming.

Women

Athlete	Event	Preliminary		Final	
Athlete	Event	Points	Rank	Points	Rank
Violeta Mitinian	Solo Technical Routine	69.300	28	did not advance	
Violeta Mitinian	Solo Free Routine	68.850	27	did not advance	
Nadezhda Gomez; Violeta Mitinian	Duet Technical Routine	65.800	40	did not advance	
Nadezhda Gomez; Violeta Mitinian	Duet Free Routine	63.750	43	did not advance	

Reserve

- Carolina Bolanos
