= Flag of Costa Rica =

Republic of Costa Rica
- Use: National flag and civil ensign
- Proportion: 3:5
- Adopted: 29 September 1848; 178 years ago
- Design: Five horizontal bands of blue, white, and red (double width).
- Designed by: Pacífica Fernández
- Pantone version
- Use: State and war flag, state and naval ensign
- Proportion: 3:5
- Adopted: 27 November 1906 (modified in 1998)
- Design: Five horizontal bands of blue, white, and red (double width), with the coat of arms on a white oval offset towards the hoist.
- Designed by: Pacífica Fernández

Coat of arms of Costa Rica

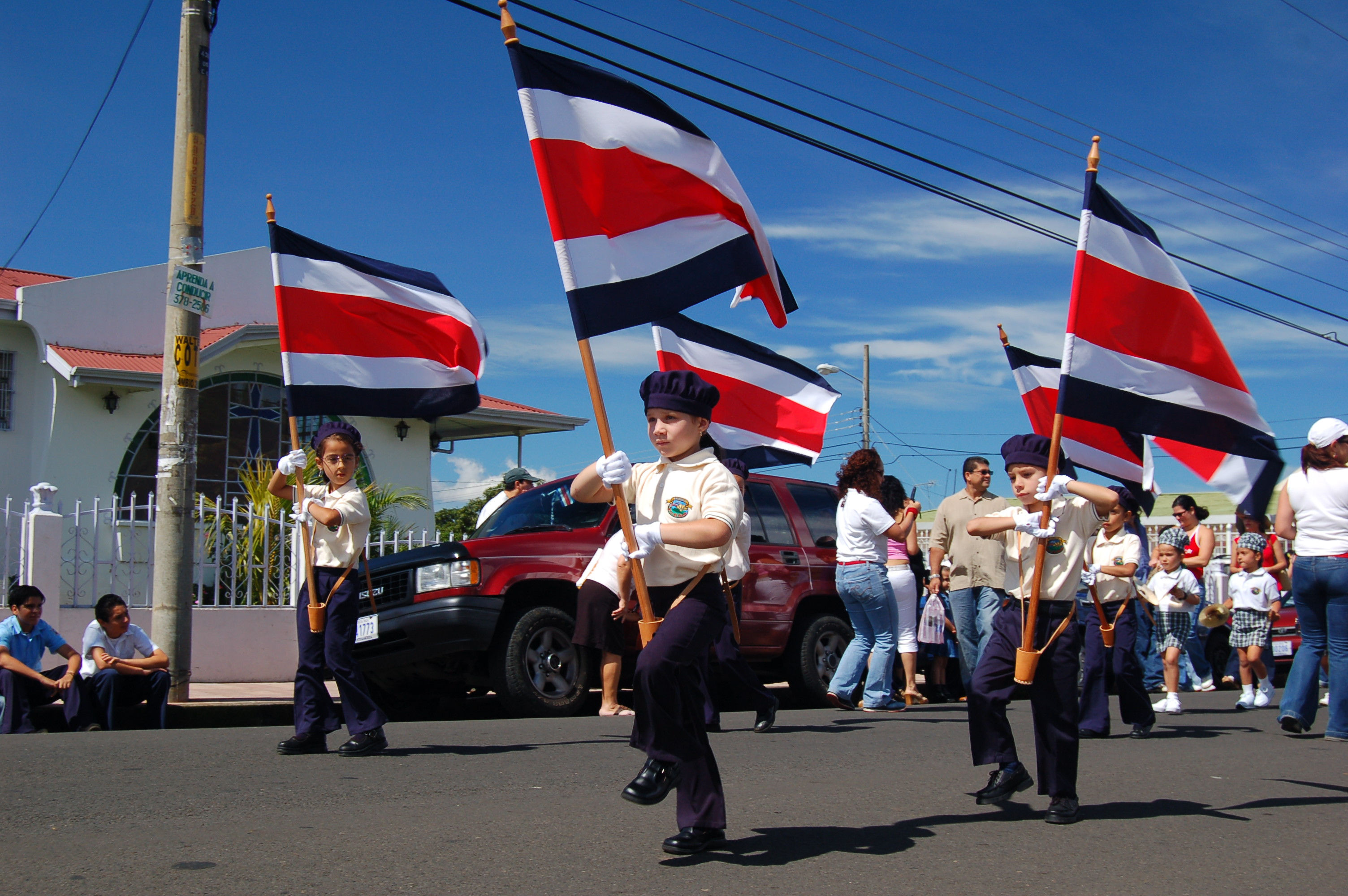
Girls in parade with the Costa Rican flag

The national flag of Costa Rica (Spanish: Bandera de Costa Rica, lit. 'Flag of Costa Rica') is based on a design created in 1848 and consists of two blue stripes, two white stripes, and a central red stripe which is twice as wide as each of the other four. The civil flag omits the coat of arms seen on the state flag, since the state variant is only permitted to be used by the government.

The flag was officially adopted on 29 September 1848, with the only modifications since then being to the placement and design of the entrenched coat of arms on the state flag. The state variant of the flag has been updated to reflect concurrent modifications to the national coat of arms in 1906, 1964, and 1998.

== Colors ==
Color scheme	Blue	Red	White
Pantone	Reflex Blue C	485 C	Process White
RGB (Note: Extrapolated from the official Pantone values.)	0,20,137	218,41,28	255,255,255
Hex	#001489	#DA291C	#FFFFFF
CMYK	100 - 85 - 00 - 46	0 - 81 - 87 - 15	0 - 0 - 0 - 0

== Symbolism ==
The colors of the flag share the ideals of French Revolution of 1848: freedom, equality, and brotherhood. Blue means the sky, opportunities at reach, intellectual thinking, perseverance to accomplish a goal, infinite, eternity, and ideals of the religious and spiritual desires. White means clear thinking, happiness, wisdom, power and beauty of the sky, the driving force of initiatives to search for new endeavors, and the peace of Costa Rica. Red means “civilization of the century” and the sun casting on Costa Rica the “first rays of its true independence”, the warmth of Costa Rican people, their love to live, their bloodshed for freedom, and their generous attitude. The seven stars in the coat of arms represent the seven provinces of the republic.

The flag is almost identical to the flag of Thailand because they both feature five horizontal stripes of red, white, and blue, with the center stripe being twice as thick as the others. However, the color orders are reversed.

== History ==
During most of its Spanish colonial period, Costa Rica was the southernmost province of the Captaincy General of Guatemala, which was nominally part of the Spanish colony of New Spain (i.e. Mexico), but which in practice operated as a largely autonomous region within the Spanish Empire. As such, the land of present Costa Rica was covered by the various flags of the Spanish Empire until 1821.

Costa Rica was part of the Federal Republic of Central America (originally known as the "United Provinces of Central America"), a sovereign state in Central America, which consisted of the territories of the former Captaincy General of Guatemala. A republican democracy, it existed from July 1823 to 1841. During this period, Costa Rica used the flag of the United Provinces of Central America, which took inspiration from the Argentinian flag. It was augmented by variations specific to the State of Costa Rica within the United Provinces of Central America (a blue and white striped United Provinces flag, with the Costa Rican State Seal added).

When the Federal Republic of Central America unofficially dissolved by 1841, Costa Rica based its flags on the Central American banner, although the 1840–42 version reversed the stripes to white-blue-white.

On 29 September 1848, a distinctive new design was created at the suggestion of Pacífica Fernández Oreamuno, wife of President José María Castro Madriz. An admirer of France (the scene of revolution in 1848), she recommended the addition of a red stripe to the flag. This basic flag has continued in use since that time. However, the coat of arms that appears on the flag used by the government was altered slightly in 1906 and 1934 and, most recently, on 21 October 1964.

== Historical national flags ==
1541 – 1821

1785 – 1821

1821 – 1823

September 1821 – 6 June 1823

6 June 1823 – 4 March 1824

4 March – 2 November 1824

2–22 November 1824

22 November 1824 – 15 November 1840

1838–1840

21 April 1840 – 20 April 1842

September 1842 – 12 November 1848

12 November 1848 – 27 November 1906

27 November 1906 – 21 October 1964

21 October 1964 – 5 May 1998

== See also ==
- List of Costa Rican flags
- Flag of Thailand
- Flag of North Korea
- Flag of Cape Verde
