= Rodrigo Alberto Carazo Zeledón =

Costa Rican lawyer, economist and politician (born 1948)

Permanent Representative to the United Nations
- In office 3 July 2018 – 30 June 2022
- President: Carlos Alvarado Quesada; Rodrigo Chaves Robles
- Preceded by: Juan Carlos Mendoza García
- Succeeded by: Maritza Chan Valverde

President of the Citizens' Action Party
- In office 28 June 2014 – 3 September 2014
- Preceded by: Olivier Pérez González
- Succeeded by: Margarita Bolaños Arquín

Deputy of the Legislative Assembly of Costa Rica
- In office 1 May 2002 – 30 April 2006
- Preceded by: Jorge Eduardo Sánchez Sibaja
- Succeeded by: Elizabeth Fonseca Corrales
- Constituency: San José (8th Office)

Personal details
- Born: Rodrigo Alberto Carazo Zeledón; 15 March 1948 (age 78) San José, Costa Rica
- Party: PAC
- Education: University of Costa Rica (LLB, BA); University of Geneva (PhD)

Rodrigo Alberto Carazo Zeledón (born 15 March 1948) is a Costa Rican politician, economist, lawyer and political scientist who was elected in June 2022 to a four-year term (starting January 1, 2023) as a member of the UN Human Rights Committee by the state parties to the International Covenant on Civil and Political Rights. He was Costa Rica's representative to the United Nations from 2018 to 2022, having presented his credentials the 31st of August 2018. He was the first Ombudsman of the Republic of Costa Rica and a former delegate to the Legislative Assembly of Costa Rica who served in that capacity during the Pacheco administration. He was president of the Partido Acción Ciudadana (Citizen Action Party, known as PAC).

Carazo Zeledón is the son of the former president of the Republic, Rodrigo Carazo Odio. Like his father, he has had a strong tendency towards social positions and is conspicuous in opposition to neoliberalism. He was one of the opposition leaders against the Central America Free Trade Agreement (CAFTA) with the United States.

In 1997, he obtained a doctorate in political science from the Graduate Institute of International Studies, in Geneva. He graduated with a Bachelor of economics and social sciences in 1977, and received his Bachelor Law Degree at the University of Costa Rica (UCR). He completed post-graduate studies in international law at the Academy of International Law in The Hague and studied economic history at the University of Costa Rica .

He was the first Ombudsman of the Republic of Costa Rica (1993–1997), as well as vice president and president of the Central American Council of Human Rights, and vice president and president of the Ibero - American Federation of Ombudsmen. Between 1984 and 1987, he was a representative of the University for Peace to the United Nations European Offices, and from 1979 to 1981 he was an ambassador in special mission for the General Assembly of the United Nations.

He was also Delegate of the Legislative Power for the Citizen Action Party, member of its Political Commission for the period 2002–2006 and president of its executive committee from June 28, 2014, until his resignation on September 3, 2014.

He has a private legal practice and several companies. He has been general manager of large companies and university professor at the UCR.

== Bibliography ==
- Rodrigo Alberto Carazo (1 January 2001). Violencia y paz en América Latina. Libro Universitario Regional. ISBN 978-9968-801-08-9.
