= Carlos Ricardo Benavides Jiménez =

Costa Rican lawyer, businessman and politician (born 1969)

Carlos Benavides Jimenez
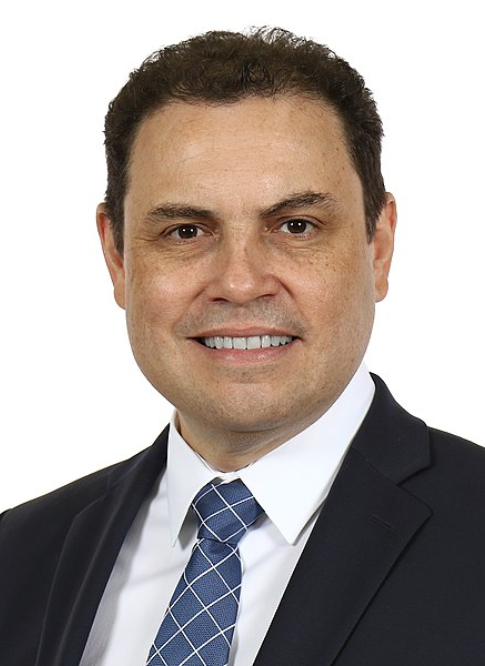
- Official portrait, 2018

57th President of the Legislative Assembly of Costa Rica
- In office 1 May 2019 – 30 April 2020
- Preceded by: Carolina Hidalgo Herrera
- Succeeded by: Eduardo Cruickshank Smith

Deputy of the Legislative Assembly of Costa Rica
- In office 1 May 2018 – 30 April 2022
- Preceded by: Ottón Solís Fallas
- Succeeded by: Rodrigo Arias Sánchez
- Constituency: San José (1st Office)
- In office 1 May 2002 – 30 April 2006
- Preceded by: Ligia Mireya Castro Ulate
- Succeeded by: Olivier Pérez González
- Constituency: Puntarenas (3rd Office)

Minister of the Presidency of Costa Rica
- In office 4 April 2011 – 8 May 2014
- President: Laura Chinchilla
- Preceded by: Marco Vargas Díaz
- Succeeded by: Melvin Jiménez Marín

Minister of Sport of Costa Rica
- In office 8 February 2011 – 13 May 2011
- President: Laura Chinchilla
- Preceded by: Giselle María Goyenaga Calvo
- Succeeded by: William Todd

Minister of Tourism of Costa Rica
- In office 8 May 2010 – 4 April 2011
- President: Laura Chinchilla
- Preceded by: Allan Flores Moya
- Succeeded by: Allan Flores Moya
- In office 8 May 2006 – 9 September 2009
- President: Óscar Arias
- Preceded by: Rodrigo Castro Fonseca
- Succeeded by: Allan Flores Moya

Personal details
- Born: Carlos Ricardo Benavides Jiménez; August 29, 1969 (age 57) Puntarenas, Costa Rica
- Party: PLN
- Education: University of Costa Rica (LLB)

Carlos Ricardo Benavides Jiménez (born August 29, 1969) is a Costa Rican lawyer, businessman, and politician who served as the 57th President of the Legislative Assembly from 2019 to 2020. A member of the National Liberation Party, he previously served as Minister of the Presidency from 2011 to 2014.

== Career ==
Benavides holds a Law degree and notary public from the University of Costa Rica. He has served as a deputy in the Legislative Assembly of Costa Rica for two different terms, between 2002-2006 and 2018-2022 respectively. He was President of the World Tourism Organization from 2008 to 2010 and served as a Minister of Tourism from 2006 to 2011 covering the administrations of Óscar Arias Sánchez and Laura Chinchilla. He later held the position of Minister of the Presidency in the remaining period of the Chinchilla administration from 2011 to 2014.
