= Víctor Morales Mora =

Costa Rican politician and civil servant

Licentiate Víctor Manuel Morales Mora
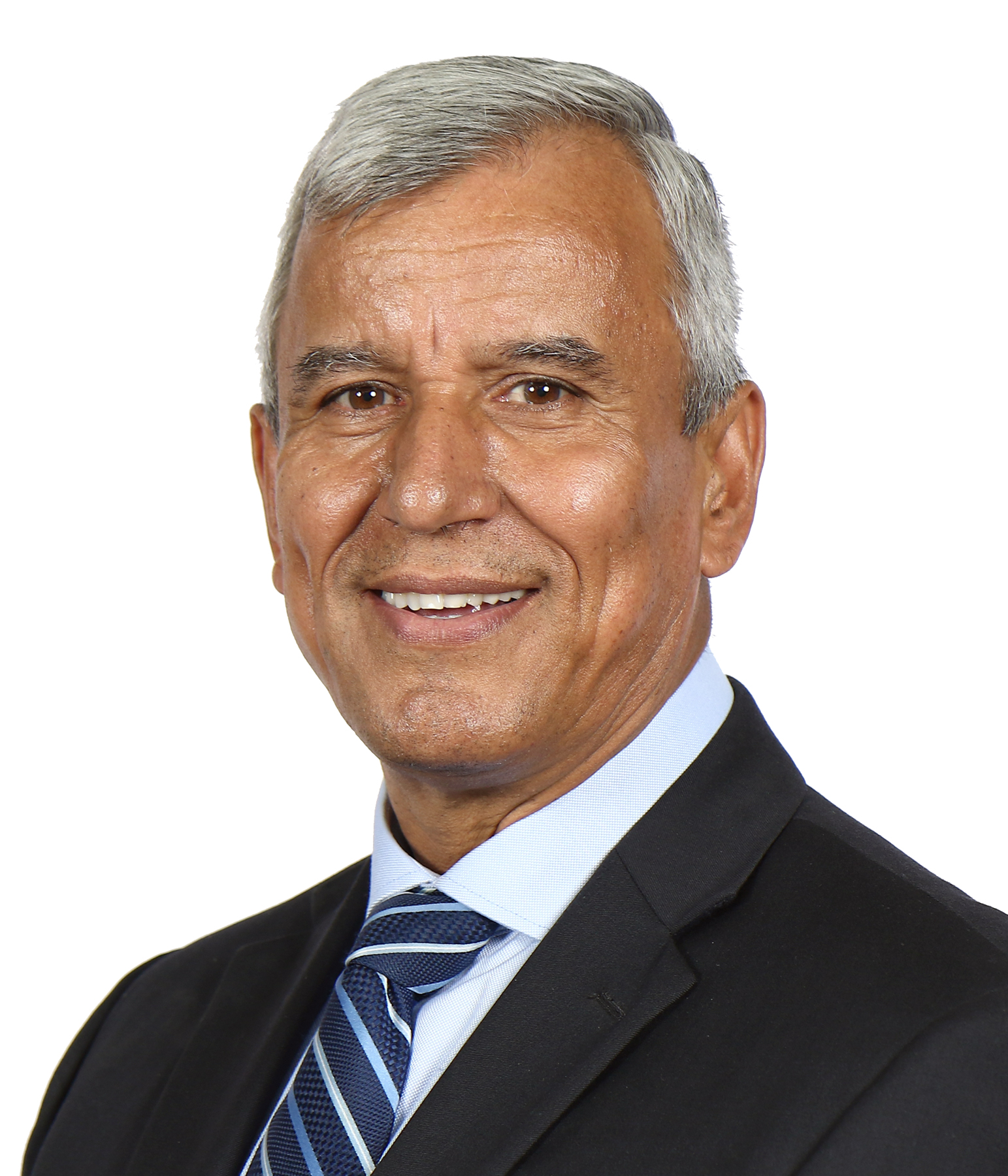

Minister of the Presidency of Costa Rica
- President: Carlos Alvarado Quesada
- Preceded by: Rodolfo Piza Rocafort
- Succeeded by: Silvia Lara (interim)
- In office 1 August 2019 – 4 March 2020

Minister of Labor
- In office 2014–1992
- President: Luis Guillermo Solís, (2014-Present)

Mayor, Aserrí
- In office 2010–2014
- Constituency: Aserrí

Minister of Labor
- In office 1998–2002
- President: Miguel Ángel Rodríguez Echeverría, (1998-2002)

Deputy Legislative Assembly of Costa Rica
- In office 1992–1994
- Constituency: Aserrí, San José

Vice-Minister of Labor
- In office 1990–1992
- President: Rafael Calderón Fournier, (1990-1992)

Personal details
- Born: Poás de Aserrí, Costa Rica
- Party: Citizens' Action Party
- Other party: formerly Social Christian Unity Party
- Profession: Lawyer and Civil Servant

Víctor Manuel Morales Mora is a Costa Rican politician and lawyer. He has served as a government minister in three different administrations and served a deputy. He was the mayor of Aserrí between 2010 and 2014.

== Biographic information ==
Morales was born in Poás de Aserrí. He grew up in Aserrí proper. He studied at Andrés Corrales Mora Elementary and the Liceo de Aserrí High School, where he was the President of his student government. He attended the University of Costa Rica where he studied political science and philosophy, earning a national certificate that enabled him to practice law.

== Public service ==
Between 1978 and 1986, Morales worked as a municipal register. In 1982, he was president of the group Social Christian Youth, a political advocacy organization. Between 1990 and 1992, Morales served as Vice-Minister of Labor to Rafael Calderón Fournier.

In 1992, he was elected as a deputy to the Legislative Assembly of Costa Rica, serving only two years. In 1995, Morales was elected President of his party, the Social Christian Unity Party (PUSC for its Spanish initials).

Between 1998 and 2002, he was Minister of Labor to Miguel Ángel Rodríguez Echeverría. In this position, he pushed for the Workers' Protection Law, which provided basic rights to unrepresented workers.

In 2006, Morales left PUSC. Morales was one of a number of PUSC members to abandon the party after a string of corruption scandals.

While teaching law between 2006 and 2010, Morales was also a legal adviser.

== Mayor of Aserrí ==
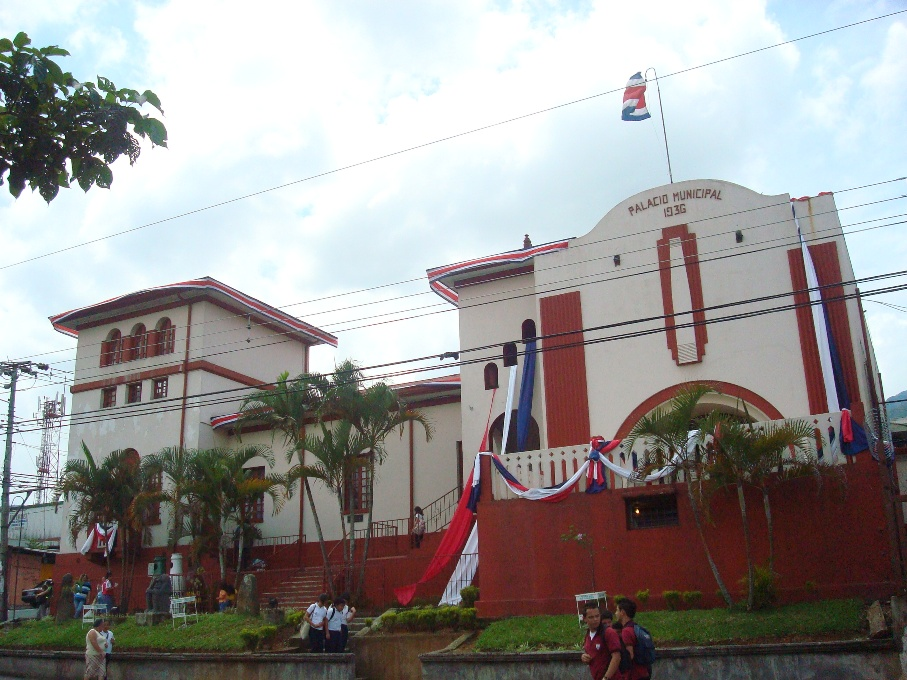
Aserrí Municipal Building

In 2010, Morales was elected mayor of Aserrí, a municipality in the San José with a population of nearly 60,000 He ran as part of a coalition of parties: PAC, PUSC, and Accessibility without Exclusion (PASE for its Spanish initials). During his campaign, Morales promised to increase public security with the creation of a municipal police force, assure water security, increase citizen participation through such measures as a digital communications line to city officials, improve accessibility for disabled persons, and support environmental protections. As mayor, Morales participated in the United Nations Disaster Office for Disaster Risk Reduction. Morales also instituted a problem-solving forum called "Dialogues" that sought to resolve conflicts through consensus.

With less than a month left in his term as mayor, President-elect Luis Guillermo Solís appointed Morales to his cabinet as Minister of Labor.
