= Olivier Pérez González =

Costa Rican politician (born 1949)

President of the Citizens' Action Party
- In office 18 May 2013 – 28 May 2014
- Preceded by: Elizabeth Fonseca Corrales
- Succeeded by: Rodrigo Carazo Zeledón

Deputy of the Legislative Assembly of Costa Rica
- In office 1 May 2006 – 30 April 2010
- Preceded by: Carlos Benavides Jiménez
- Succeeded by: Adonay Enríquez Guevara
- Constituency: Puntarenas (3rd Office)

Personal details
- Born: Olivier Pérez González; 8 June 1949 (age 77) Coto Brus, Costa Rica
- Party: Citizens' Action Party (since 2000)
- Profession: Lawyer and politician

Olivier Pérez González (born 8 June 1949) is a Costa Rican lawyer and retired politician who served as a deputy in the Legislative Assembly from 2006 to 2010. A member of the Citizens' Action Party, he chaired the party from 2013 to 2014.

He is a lawyer who graduated from Universidad Autónoma de Centro América (Autonomous University of Central America).

Pérez represented Puntarenas as a deputy between 2006 and 2010. As a deputy, he was Secretary of the Commission on Economic and Tourism Affairs.

Pérez campaigned vigorously on behalf of Luis Guillermo Solís for the presidency, which Solís eventually won. During the campaign, Pérez criticized corruption from the National Liberation Party

Pérez replaced Elizabeth Fonseca Corrales as president of PAC, earning 43 votes to Federico Picado's 26 votes in a party assembly. Pérez claims that he will continue the PAC's open primary system.
