= Lineth Saborío Chaverri =

Costa Rican politician (born 1960)

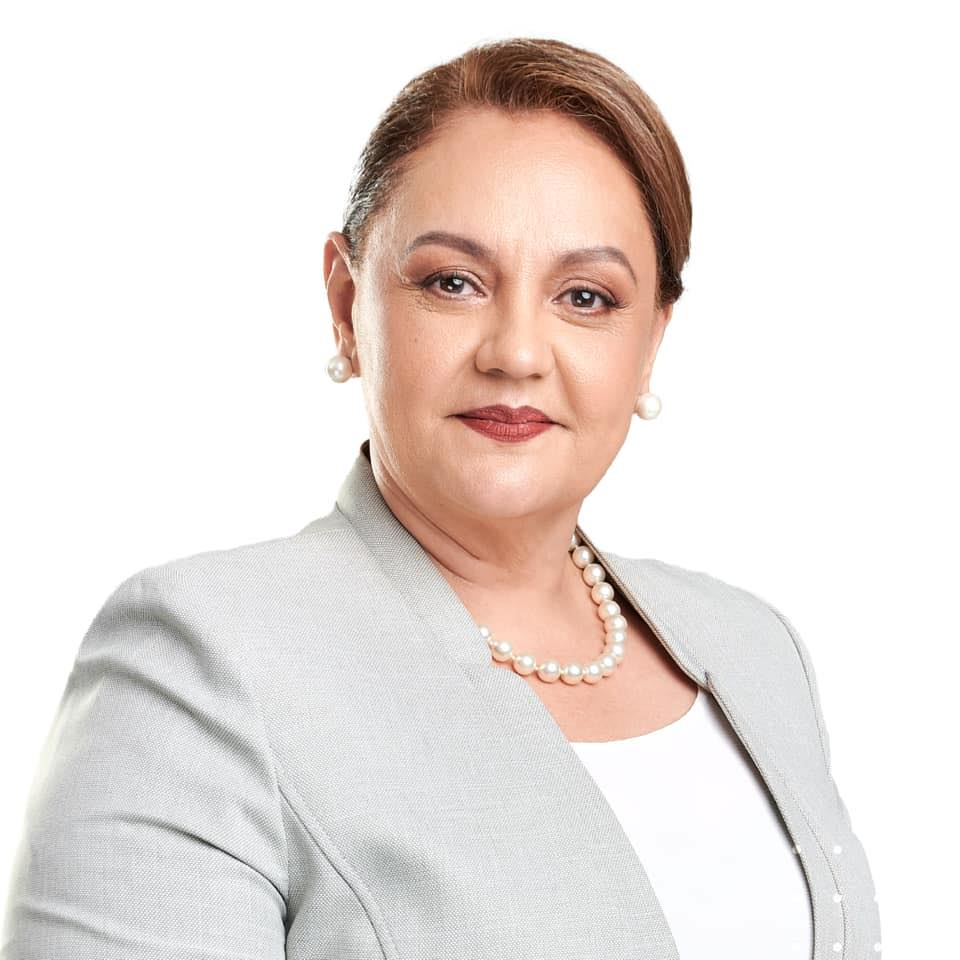
- Saborio in 2021

First Vice-President of Costa Rica
- In office 8 May 2002 – 8 May 2006
- President: Abel Pacheco de la Espriella
- Preceded by: Astrid Fischel Volio
- Succeeded by: Laura Chinchilla Miranda

Minister of the Presidency of Costa Rica
- In office 13 September 2004 – 8 May 2006
- President: Abel Pacheco de la Espriella
- Preceded by: Ricardo Toledo Carranza
- Succeeded by: Rodrigo Arias Sánchez

Minister of National Planning and Economic Policy
- In office 4 February 2003 – 13 September 2004
- President: Abel Pacheco de la Espriella
- Preceded by: Rina Contreras López
- Succeeded by: Jorge Polinaris Vargas

Director General of the Judicial Investigation Department
- In office 1997–2001

Personal details
- Born: María Lineth de la Trinidad Saborío Chaverri; 4 November 1960 (age 65) Grecia, Costa Rica
- Party: PUSC
- Education: University of Costa Rica (LLB); University of Barcelona (MA)

María Lineth de la Trinidad Saborío Chaverri (born 4 November 1960) is a Costa Rican lawyer and politician who served as First Vice President of Costa Rica from 2002 to 2006. A member of the Social Christian Unity Party, she previously led the Judicial Investigation Department (OIJ) from 1997 to 2001.

== Political career ==
She won the 2021 Social Christian Unity Party presidential primary. In the 2022 Costa Rican general election, she came in fourth place.
