= Marco Diaz =

Marco Diaz or Marco Díaz may refer to:

== People ==
- Marco Antonio Serna Díaz, herpetologist, ornithologist, and naturalist from Colombia
- Marco Vargas Diaz, Costa Rican economist and politician
- Marco Díaz, political candidate in the 2021 Chilean gubernatorial elections
- Marco Diaz Jr., record producer and DJ known as Infamous
- Marco Díaz, musician from the band Candela

== Fictional characters ==
- Marco Diaz, a character in the animated television series Star vs. the Forces of Evil
- Marco Diaz, a character in the television series Bloodline

== See also ==
- Marco Diaz Ávalos, football manager for Coras de Nayarit F.C.
- Marcos Díaz (disambiguation)
