= Alberto Cañas Escalante =

Costa Rican politician and writer (1920–2014)

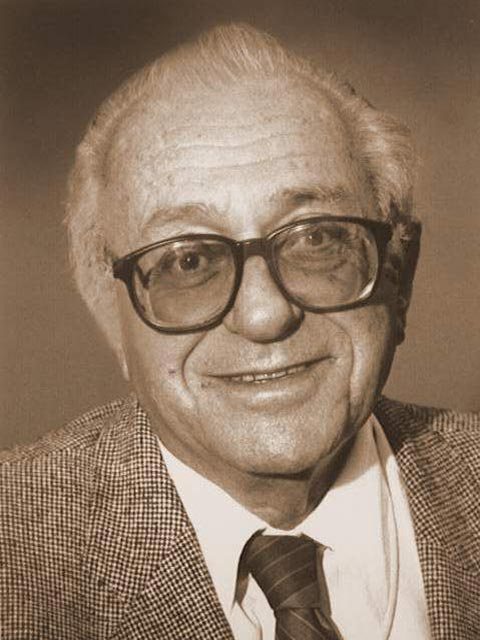
- Cañas in 1994

President of the Citizens' Action Party
- In office 9 February 2009 – 27 February 2010
- Preceded by: Epsy Campbell Barr
- Succeeded by: Elizabeth Fonseca Corrales

36th President of the Legislative Assembly of Costa Rica
- In office 1 May 1994 – 30 April 1995
- Preceded by: Danilo Chaverri Soto
- Succeeded by: Antonio Álvarez Desanti

Deputy of the Legislative Assembly of Costa Rica
- In office 1 May 1994 – 30 April 1998
- Preceded by: Miguel Ángel Rodríguez
- Succeeded by: Abel Pacheco de la Espriella
- Constituency: San José (1st Office)
- In office 1 May 1962 – 30 April 1966
- Preceded by: Álvaro Montero Padilla
- Succeeded by: José Luis Molina Quesada
- Constituency: San José (3rd Office)

Minister of Culture, Youth and Sports
- In office 5 July 1971 – 8 May 1974
- President: José Figueres Ferrer
- Preceded by: Office established
- Succeeded by: Carmen Naranjo Coto

Personal details
- Born: Alberto Cañas Escalante; 16 March 1920 San José, Costa Rica
- Died: 14 June 2014 (aged 94)
- Party: Citizens' Action Party (2000–2012)
- Other political affiliations: National Liberation Party (1951–2000)
- Occupation: Lawyer; journalist; politician; professor; writer

Alberto Cañas Escalante (16 March 1920 – 14 June 2014) was a politician, writer, intellectual, public servant, and journalist from San José, Costa Rica. He is known as one of the most important figures in the cultural, political, and social life of Costa Rica during the latter half of the twentieth century. The National Library System of Costa Rica credits Cañas with more than 4,773 publications as of 2005.

He was Vice Minister of International Relations (1955–1956), ambassador (1956–1958), and a two-time deputy (1962–1966 and 1994–1998). Additionally, he was the first Minister of Culture, Youth, and Sports (1970). He edited several newspapers: Diario de Costa Rica (Costa Rica Daily), La República (The Republic), and Excelsior (Excelsior). He wrote editorials for La Nación (The Nation), La Prensa Libre (The Free Press), and Semanario Universidad (University Weekly). Cañas is the great-grandson of General José María Cañas Escamilla.

== Biography ==
Cañas was born in San José. His sister taught him to read at the age of three. He attended elementary school at the Edificio Metálico (Metal Building), a San José landmark. Cañas attended secondary school at Liceo de Costa Rica (Costa Rica Lyceum), where he graduated in 1937. He attended the University of Costa Rica, studying law and graduating as an attorney in 1944. His thesis involved the nature of political parties. Studying at the same time as Cañas were other national politicians including Rodrigo Facio, Carlos Monge, Gonzalo Facio, Jorge Rossi Chavarría, Daniel Oduber, and Hernán González. After the Costa Rican Civil War, this group of intellectuals would change the nature of Costa Rican politics.

In 1944, Cañas began working for Diario de Costa Rica (Costa Rica Daily), San José-based newspaper. Because he was concerned largely with social questions, Cañas joined the Center for the Study of National Problems. In the 1946, Cañas wrote "Elegía Inmóvil" ("Unmoving Elegy"), a book-length poem that brought him international attention, although he would shortly thereafter abandon poetry to focus on politics and letters.

In 1950, he founded and edited La República (The Republic), another Costa Rican newspaper. He later founded and edited Excelsior. He also wrote "Una Casa en el Barrio Carmen" ("A House in the Carmen Neighborhood") in 1965, a book for which he received considerable praise. It was reprinted at least four times.

== Political life ==
Cañas became the Costa Rican ambassador to the United Nations in 1948 and 1949. He contributed to the writing of the Universal Declaration of Human Rights. He was Vice Minister of International Relations from 1955 to 1956 and a San José deputy for the National Liberation Party from 1962 until 1966. From 1970 to 1974, Cañas served as Minister of Culture, Youth, and Sports. During his time there, he encouraged the development of cultural and literary values among Costa Ricans. He was President of the Legislative Assembly 1994–1995. Cañas helped found the Citizens' Action Party (PAC for its Spanish initials) in 2002 along with members of the two leading political parties of the country. He served as president of PAC's Political Commission.

== Academic life ==
In 1971, Cañas founded the National Theater Company. Among his duties, he was a theatrical teacher, promoter, and creator. He worked in the College of Science and Letters at UCR.

Additionally, he served as President of the Journalists Association in 1952, President of Editorial Costa Rica since 1960, President of the Writers Association from 1960 to 1961, and board member of the governing Social Security organization in 1989, among other responsibilities. Since 1967, Cañas has served as a chairperson of the Language Academy of Costa Rica, a position which has since been made permanent.

== Later years ==
Cañas was a permanent member of the Costa Rican Academy of Language. Additionally, he hosted "Así es la cosa" ("Here's the Thing") on Radio Monumental, alongside Fernando Durán and Álvaro Fernández. Cañas also wrote "Chisporroteos" (Crackles), a newspaper column for more than forty years which made him one of Costa Rica's most prolific authors. He was also a professor at the University of Costa Rica in the school of Social Sciences.

On 14 June 2014, Cañas died of complications after intestinal surgery. He was 94.

== Awards ==
In 1965, Cañas won the "Premio Aquileo Echeverría de Cuento" ("Aquileo Echeverría Story Prize") for his work book "Una Casa en el Barrio Carmen." In 1976, he won the Magón National Prize for Culture. In 1964, he won the Premio García Monge (García Monge Prize) for the promotion of culture. Cañas has won numerous other awards. He received an honorary degree from the State Correspondence University and the commendation of "Comendador de la Orden de Liberación de España" (Commander of the Order of Spanish Liberation) in 1951, membership in the Order of Vasco Núñez de Balboa in 1957, and the Ordine della Stella della Solidarietà Italiana (Order of the Star of Italian Solidarity) in 1959. He won the Pío Víquez Prize for Journalism in 2012 for his long career as a journalist.

== Selection of books ==
- "OCHENTA AÑOS NO ES NADA." Editorial de la Universidad de Costa Rica, 2006
- "UVIETA." REI Centroamérica, 1999
- "FELIZ AÑO, CHAVES CHAVES." Editorial Cuarto Poder, Buenos Aires, 1975
- "LA EXTERMINACION DE LOS POBRES." Editorial Costa Rica, 1974
- "LA SEGUA Y OTRAS PIEZAS." Educa, San José, 1974
- "EN AGOSTO HIZO DOS AÑOS." Editorial Costa Rica, 1968
- "AQUÍ Y AHORA." Editorial Costa Rica, 1965
- "EL LUTO ROBADO." Editorial Costa Rica, 1963
- "LOS 8 AÑOS." Editorial Liberación Nacional, 1955
- "ELEGÍA INMOVIL." Editorial El Cuervo, 1946
