= Astrid Fischel Volio =

Costa Rican historian and politician (born 1954)

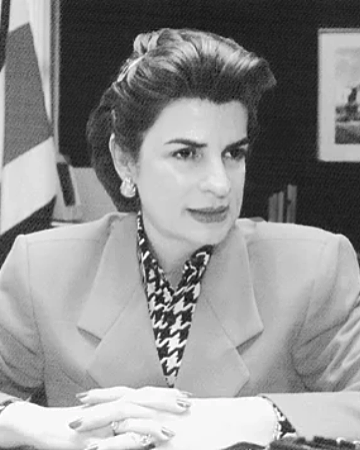

Minister of Public Education
- In office 8 May 2002 – 11 June 2003
- President: Abel Pacheco de la Espriella
- Preceded by: Guillermo Vargas Salazar
- Succeeded by: Manuel Antonio Bolaños Salas

First Vice President of Costa Rica
- In office 8 May 1998 – 8 May 2002
- President: Miguel Ángel Rodríguez
- Preceded by: Rodrigo Oreamuno Blanco
- Succeeded by: Lineth Saborío Chaverri

Minister of Culture, Youth and Sports
- In office 8 May 1998 – 15 October 1999
- President: Miguel Ángel Rodríguez
- Preceded by: Arnoldo Mora Rodríguez
- Succeeded by: Enrique Granados Moreno

Personal details
- Born: Astrid Fischel Volio; 26 March 1954 (age 72) San José, Costa Rica
- Party: PUSC
- Education: University of Costa Rica (BA); University of Southampton (PhD)
- Occupation: Historian; politician; professor; writer

Astrid Fischel Volio (born 26 March 1954) is a Costa Rican historian, academic and politician who served as First Vice President of Costa Rica from 1998 to 2002. A member of the Social Christian Unity Party, she later served as Minister of Public Education from 2002 to 2003.

== Life ==
Astrid Fischel Volio was educated at the University of Costa Rica and the University of Southampton. From 1984 to 1998 she was Professor at the History and Geography School of the University of Costa Rica.

From 1998 to 2002 she was First Vice President and Minister of Culture. She was appointed Minister of Education in 2002, but was forced to resign on 3 June 2003, amid a teachers' strike over the Ministry's inability to pay teachers.

== Works ==
- Consenso y represión: Una interpretación sociopolítica de la educación costarricense [Consensus and Repression: A Socio-Political Interpretation of Costa Rican Education], 1987
- El Uso Ingenioso de la Ideología en Costa Rica [The Clever Use of Ideology in Costa Rica], 1992
