= Rodrigo Oreamuno Blanco =

Costa Rican lawyer and politician (born 1939)

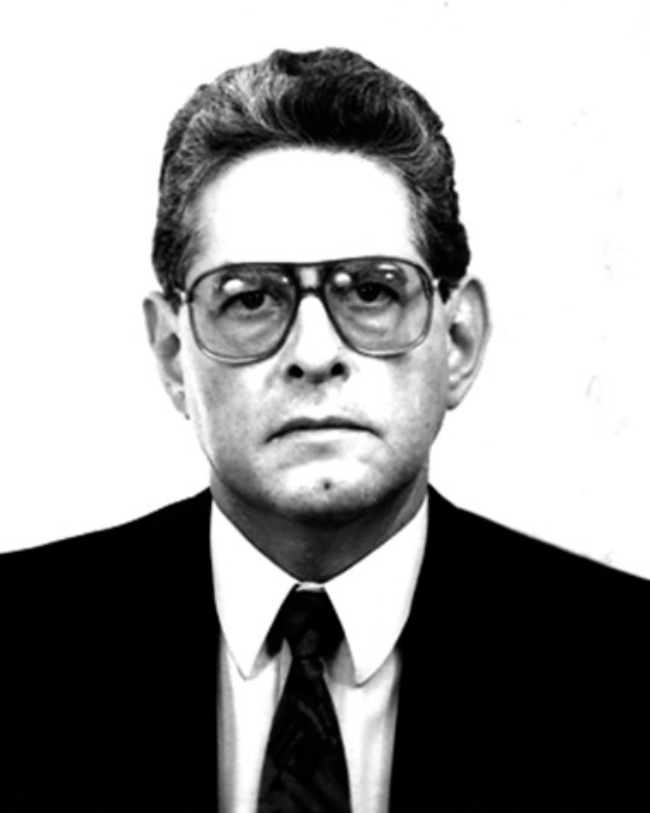
- Oreamuno in 1978

First Vice President of Costa Rica
- In office 8 May 1994 – 8 May 1998 Serving with Rebeca Grynspan
- President: José María Figueres
- Preceded by: Germán Serrano Pinto
- Succeeded by: Astrid Fischel Volio

Minister of the Presidency of Costa Rica
- In office 8 March 1995 – 3 July 1996
- President: José María Figueres
- Preceded by: Elías Soley Soler
- Succeeded by: Marco Vargas Díaz

Deputy of the Legislative Assembly of Costa Rica
- In office 1 May 1990 – 30 April 1994
- Preceded by: Cristian Tattenbach Iglesias
- Succeeded by: Constantino Urcuyo Fournier
- Constituency: San José (12nd Office)

Personal details
- Born: Rodrigo Oreamuno Blanco; 28 July 1939 (age 87) Cartago, Costa Rica
- Party: PLN
- Education: University of Costa Rica (LLB)

Rodrigo Oreamuno Blanco (born 28 July 1939) is a Costa Rican lawyer and politician who served as First Vice President of Costa Rica from 1994 to 1998. A member of the National Liberation Party, he previously served as a deputy in the Legislative Assembly from 1990 to 1994.

In the 2018 elections, he endorsed the candidate Carlos Alvarado Quesada of the Citizens' Action Party.
