= Rodrigo Arias Sánchez =

Costa Rican lawyer and politician (born 1946)

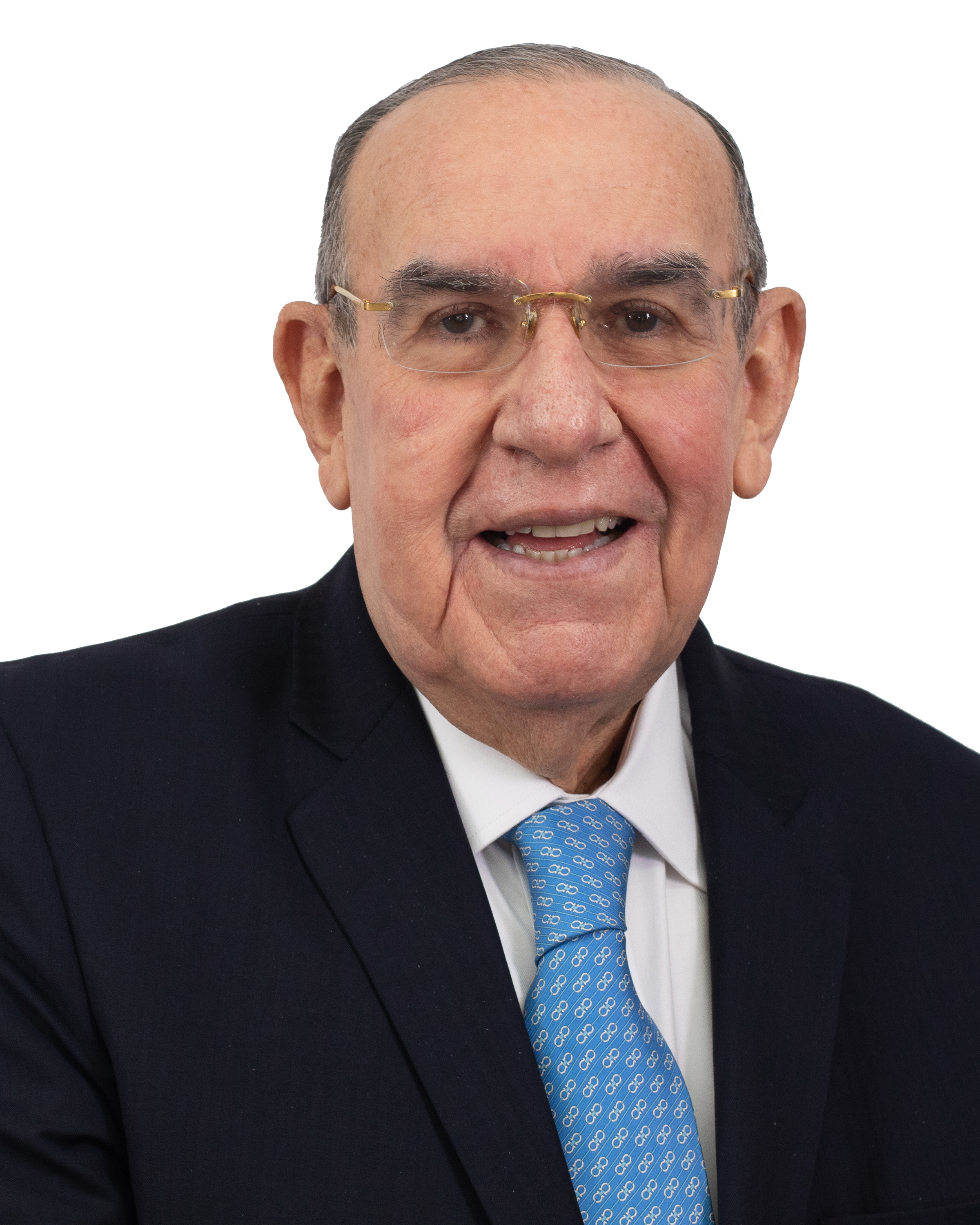
- Official portrait, 2022

60th President of the Legislative Assembly of Costa Rica
- In office 1 May 2022 – 30 April 2026
- Vice President: Gloria Navas Montero (2022-2024); Rosalía Brown Young (2024-2025); Vanessa de Paul Castro Mora (2025-2026)
- Preceded by: Silvia Hernández Sánchez
- Succeeded by: Yara Jiménez Fallas

Deputy of the Legislative Assembly of Costa Rica
- In office 1 May 2022 – 30 April 2026
- Preceded by: Carlos Benavides Jiménez
- Succeeded by: Nogui Acosta Jaén
- Constituency: San José (3rd Office)
- In office 1 May 1986 – 8 May 1986
- Preceded by: Edgar Víquez
- Succeeded by: Danilo Chaverri Soto
- Constituency: Heredia (1st Office)

Minister of the Presidency of Costa Rica
- In office 8 March 2006 – 8 May 2010
- President: Óscar Arias
- Preceded by: Lineth Saborío Chaverri
- Succeeded by: Marco Vargas Díaz
- In office 8 May 1986 – 8 May 1990
- President: Óscar Arias
- Preceded by: Danilo Jiménez Veiga
- Succeeded by: Rodolfo Méndez Mata

Personal details
- Born: Rodrigo Gerardo de Jesús Arias Sánchez; 21 November 1946 (age 79) Heredia, Costa Rica
- Party: PLN
- Education: University of Costa Rica (LLB); University of Pennsylvania (LL.M.)

Rodrigo Gerardo de Jesús Arias Sánchez (born 26 July 1946) is a Costa Rican lawyer and politician who served as the 60th President of the Legislative Assembly from 2022 to 2026. A member of the National Liberation Party, he previously served as Minister of the Presidency during the two governments of his brother, Óscar Arias, from 1986 to 1990 and 2006 to 2010.

== Early life and education ==
Sánchez was born in Heredia on 26 July 1946, the second child after Óscar Arias, of Juan Rafael Arias Trejos and Lylliam Sánchez Cortés.

Sánchez graduated from the University of Costa Rica with a Bachelor of Laws in 1969 before earning a Master of Laws from the University of Pennsylvania in 1971.

== Political career ==
Sánchez was elected municipal councilor of Heredia for the four-year term 1974–1978. He achieved this victory even though he had not always been a member of the ranks of the National Liberation Party – as his brother Óscar Arias – because as a young man he sympathized with the presidential candidacy of José Joaquín Trejos, of the National Unification Party, who ruled from 1966 to 1970.

After being advisor to the President of the Republic, Sánchez was appointed as Minister of the Presidency during the two governments of his brother, Óscar Arias Sánchez, from 1986 to 1990 and 2006 to 2010. During his tenures as Minister, Sánchez played an important role as a government spokesman and in favor of CAFTA implementation laws. In March 2009, Rodrigo Arias Sánchez declared himself in favor of a constitutional reform.

Following the general elections, on 1 May 2022, Sánchez was elected President of the Legislative Assembly of Costa Rica with 50 votes in favor.

== Controversies ==
During his tenure as President of the Legislative Assembly, Arias faced multiple accusations and conflicts with the Executive Branch.

=== Alleged Irregular Acquisition of Land in El Jobo, Guanacaste ===
In 2024, Rodrigo Arias was mentioned in the controversy known as the El Jobo Case, involving land located in the district of El Jobo, Guanacaste. The government of Rodrigo Chaves announced that it had filed a complaint with the Public Prosecutor's Office regarding alleged irregularities in the acquisition and concession of land linked to Corporación Adral, a company owned by the Arias brothers. According to government authorities, allegedly falsified documents were used to obtain concessions over land located within the maritime-terrestrial zone. The National Liberation Party (PLN) rejected the allegations, arguing that the matter had already been investigated. Arias stated that he had no involvement in the management of the company and that the properties had been acquired in accordance with the law.

The controversy gained further attention following several journalistic investigations examining the origins of the properties involved. A report by José Luis Rodríguez, published by Trivisión, alleged that several parcels originally granted by the former Agrarian Development Institute (IDA) to farming families had been transferred through a series of transactions that ultimately incorporated them into tourism developments in the El Jobo area. The investigation claimed that some of the properties became linked to companies associated with the Arias brothers and business figures connected to tourism projects such as Dreams Las Mareas.

=== Revocation of U.S. Visa ===
In July 2025, the government of the United States revoked Arias's entry visa. U.S. authorities did not publicly disclose the reasons for the decision. Arias stated that the measure caused him “deep surprise” and that he was unaware of any objective reason that would justify it.

=== Confrontations with the Executive Branch ===
During 2025, political tensions between Arias and President Rodrigo Chaves intensified. Chaves publicly accused Arias of having "betrayed institutionalism" through his handling of various legislative procedures. These statements were made amid growing tensions between the Executive and Legislative branches of government.

=== Alleged Irregular Appointments ===
In September 2026, pro-government legislator Marta Esquivel filed a criminal complaint before the Prosecutor's Office for Integrity, Transparency and Anti-Corruption against Arias, alleging irregular appointments made during his tenure as President of the Legislative Assembly. The complaint was based, among other elements, on internal audit reports that identified alleged irregularities in hiring and appointment processes. At the time of filing, the allegations had not been resolved by the courts.
