= Weightlifting at the 2010 South American Games – Women's 75kg =

The Women's 75 kg event at the 2010 South American Games was held over March 29 at 16:00.

== Medalists ==
Gold	Silver	Bronze
Ubaldina Valoyes; Colombia	Yarvanis Herrera; Venezuela	Maria Alvarez; Venezuela

== Results ==
Rank	Athlete	Bodyweight	Snatch			Clean & Jerk			Total
Rank	Athlete	Bodyweight	1	2	3	1	2	3	Total
1st place, gold medalist(s)	Ubaldina Valoyes (COL)	73.77	100	103	105	~~125~~	~~125~~	125	230
2nd place, silver medalist(s)	Yarvanis Herrera (VEN)	73.69	~~100~~	100	103	~~120~~	120	~~126~~	223
3rd place, bronze medalist(s)	Maria Alvarez (VEN)	73.92	95	99	101	~~117~~	~~117~~	117	218
4	Maria F Paris (CHI)	74.13	91	~~95~~	~~95~~	120	~~128~~	~~128~~	211
5	Rosa Angela Silva (ECU)	73.76	88	92	95	105	111	~~116~~	206
6	Nicol Valeska Araya (CHI)	74.57	82	86	~~90~~	100	105	~~110~~	206
7	Natalia Diaz (ARG)	72.97	~~80~~	80	85	~~100~~	101	~~106~~	186
