= Elizabeth Fonseca Corrales =

Costa Rican politician and historian (born 1949)

Minister of Culture and Youth
- In office 8 May 2014 – 15 May 2015
- President: Luis Guillermo Solís Rivera
- Preceded by: Manuel Obregón López
- Succeeded by: Sylvie Durán Salvatierra

President of the Citizens' Action Party
- In office 1 May 2010 – 18 May 2013
- Preceded by: Alberto Cañas Escalante
- Succeeded by: Olivier Pérez González

Deputy of the Legislative Assembly of Costa Rica
- In office 1 May 2006 – 30 April 2010
- Preceded by: Rodrigo Carazo Zeledón
- Succeeded by: María Eugenia Venegas
- Constituency: San José (8th Office)

Personal details
- Born: Elizabeth Bernardita Fonseca Corrales; 20 August 1949 (age 76) Heredia, Costa Rica
- Party: Citizens' Action Party (since 2000)
- Education: University of Costa Rica (BA); University of Paris (PhD)
- Occupation: Historian; politician; professor; writer

Elizabeth Bernardita Fonseca Corrales (born 20 August 1949) is a Costa Rican historian and retired politician who served as Minister of Culture and Youth from 2014 to 2015. A member of the Citizens' Action Party, she previously served as a deputy in the Legislative Assembly from 2006 to 2010

Fonseca holds a doctorate in History and American Society from the University of Paris, and was a professor and researcher at the University of Costa Rica during her academic career. She was president of the PAC from 2010 to 2013.

== Political career ==
Fonseca is a founding member of PAC. She was elected as a deputy for San José in Costa Rican general elections in 2006. She helped organize PAC's opposition to the Central American Free Trade Agreement in 2006 and 2007.

Following the resignation of Alberto Cañas Escalante, Fonseca and medical doctor Rodrigo Cabezas both applied for the PAC presidency Fonseca was elected, promising to raise PAC's institutional profile. In 2013, Fonseca used her position to push for open primaries, which resulted in the election of Luis Guillermo Solís as PAC's presidential candidate. Solís would go on to win 78% of the national vote in the general election.

Fonseca credits PAC with breaking the nation's two-party rule by making the Social Christian Unity Party (PUSC for its Spanish initials) a minority party in the National Assembly. While the National Liberation Party (PLN for its Spanish initials) maintains its majority, PUSC has lost many legislative seats to PAC.

Fonseca was appointed Minister of Culture in 2014.

== Awards ==
Following the publication of her doctoral thesis in 1983, Fonseca gained significant academic recognition. The topic of her thesis, agrarian and colonial history in Costa Rica, helped document the country's early history.

- “Aquileo J. Echeverría” National Prize for History, 1984
- “Cleto González Víquez” Prize for Geography and History, 1984
- Professor in Residence, Academy of Geography and History, Costa Rica
- Academic Correspondent to Argentine, Venezuelan, Guatemalan, and Portuguese Academies of Geography and History

== Publications and research ==
Fonseca has written or collaborated on the following projects and books:

- "Juan Manuel de Cañas"
- "Costa Rica colonial. La tierra y el hombre" ("Colonial Costa Rica: The Land and The People")
- "Historia de un pueblo indígena: Tucurrique" ("History of an Indigenous Tribe: Tucurrique")
- "Historia. Teoría y métodos" ("History: Theory and Methods")
- "Centroamérica. Su historia" ("Central America: Its History")
- "Historia General de Centroamérica. Tomo II" ("General History of Central America: Volume II")
- "Costa Rica en el Siglo XVIII" ("Costa Rica in the 18th Century")
