= Geannina Dinarte Romero =

Costa Rican politician

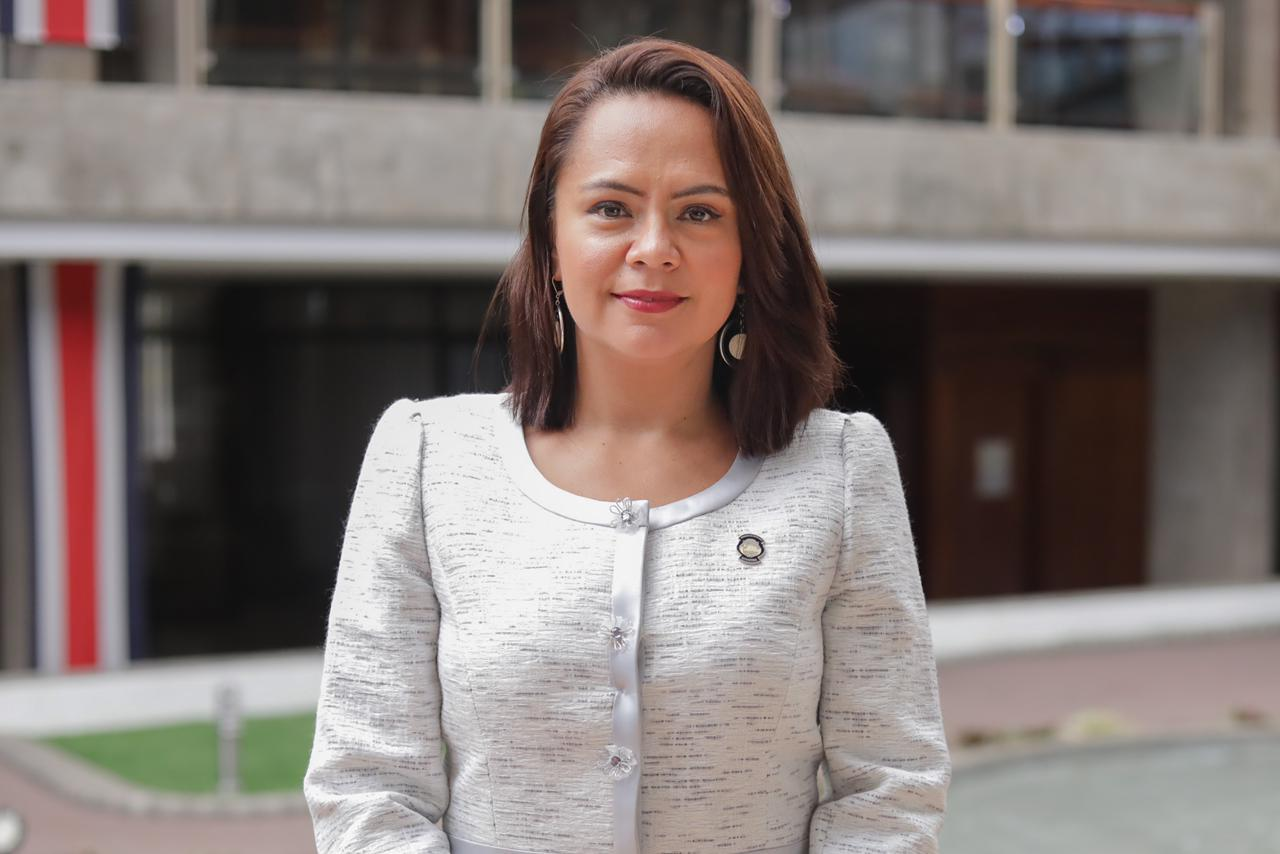
- Dinarte Romero in 2020

30th Minister of the Presidency
- In office December 21, 2020 – May 8, 2022
- President: Carlos Alvarado Quesada
- Preceded by: Marcelo Prieto Jiménez
- Succeeded by: Natalia Díaz Quintana

Costa Rica Minister of Labor and Social Security
- President: Carlos Alvarado Quesada
- Preceded by: Steven Núñez Rímola
- Succeeded by: Silvia Lara Povedano

Costa Rica Minister of Economy, Industry and Commerce
- President: Luis Guillermo Solís Rivera
- Preceded by: Welmer Ramos González
- Succeeded by: Victoria Hernández Mora

Personal details
- Born: Carmen Geannina Dinarte Romero; October 19, 1982 (age 43) Carmen, San José, Costa Rica
- Party: Citizens' Action Party
- Domestic partner: Mariano Figueres Olsen (until 2019)
- Education: University of Costa Rica (Bachelors degree in political science)

Carmen Geannina Dinarte Romero (born October 19, 1982) is a Costa Rican politician who served as the minister of the Presidency of Costa Rica from 2020 to 2022. A member of the Citizens' Action Party, she served as vice minister of SMEs and Entrepreneurship between 2014 and 2017 and as minister of Economy, Industry and Commerce between 2017 and 2018 in the Solís Rivera administration, and as minister of Labor and Social Security in the Alvarado Quesada administration from 2018 to 2020. Dinarte became the youngest person to hold the Ministry of the Presidency, as well as the third woman and the first person of Guanacastecan origin to do so, when she was appointed by president Carlos Alvarado Quesada in December 2020.

== Early life and education ==
Dinarte Romero was born in Carmen, San José, on October 19, 1982. She was raised in the town of Lagunilla, in the canton of Santa Cruz, in the province of Guanacaste. She attended the University of Costa Rica, where she graduated with a bachelor's degree in political science with an emphasis on government and public policy, in 2006. Then, she attends the Central American Institute of Public Administration (ICAP), where she graduated in 2009 with a master's degree in development project management.

== Career ==
After graduating from the University of Costa Rica in 2006, Dinarte began her career working as a legislative advisor for the Citizens' Action Party (PAC) fraction and, in 2010, she began working as director of Undergraduate Thesis at the International University of the Americas.

Dinarte assumed her first ministerial position on May 8, 2014, when the then newly elected president of the Republic, Luis Guillermo Solís Rivera, appointed her as vice minister of SMEs and Entrepreneurship of the Ministry of Economy, Industry and Commerce. Successively, on 14 February 2017, and following the resignation of minister Welmer Ramos González, she was appointed by the president as minister of this entity.

In 2019, she became director of advisers for the legislative fraction of the Citizen Action Party, a position she held until the beginning of 2020.

On October 3, 2019, president Carlos Alvarado Quesada, appointed her as minister of Labor and Social Security in replacement of the previous minister. Her work as a minister of this entity was influenced by the COVID-19 pandemic, which affected the country since March 2020 and required special attention of the minister and the ministry. Among some of the policies carried out by the minister and the ministry, is the so-called "Plan Proteger", a temporary economic aid program for those people in a situation of labor vulnerability caused by the effects of the pandemic.

On December 21, 2020, she was appointed by president Carlos Alvarado Quesada as minister of the Presidency after the resignation of the previous Minister, Marcelo Prieto Jiménez. Dinarte is the third woman to hold this position, only behind Rina Conteras López (2002-2004) and Lineth Saborío Chaverri (2004-2006), as well as being the youngest person and the first person of Guanacaste to do so.
