= Silvia Hernandez =

Silvia Hernández may refer to:

- Silvia Hernández Enríquez, Mexican politician, born 1948
- Silvia Hernández Sánchez, Costa Rican politician, born 1976
