= Ministry of the Presidency (Costa Rica) =

Government ministry of Costa Rica

- Ministerio de la Presidencia
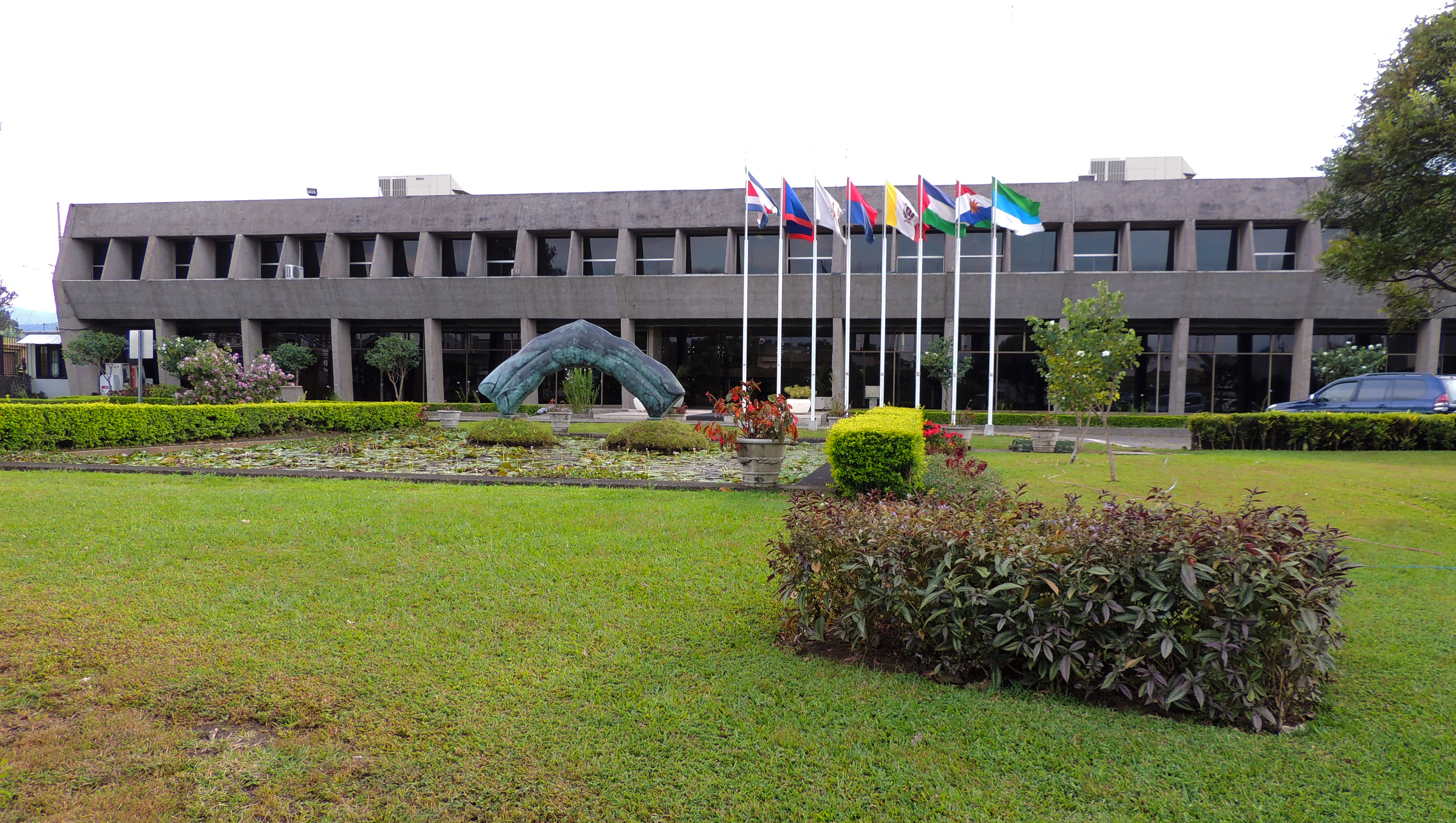

Agency overview
- Formed: 24 December 1961
- Jurisdiction: Costa Rica
- Annual budget: ₡12,164,000,000 (2023)
- Minister responsible: Rodrigo Chaves Robles
- Child agencies: Directorate of Intelligence and National Security; Costa Rican Drug Institute; Civil Service Administrative Court
- Website: https://www.presidencia.go.cr/

The Ministry of the Presidency (Spanish: Ministerio de la Presidencia) is a ministry of the Republic of Costa Rica created on 24 December 1961 through Law 2980. Its work prescribed by law consists in providing support to the President of the Republic, serving as a liaison between the Presidency and the other branches of government, civil society and the various ministries.

Being one of the most political ministries, since it has to coordinate with the social and political organizations, with the Legislative Assembly and with the opposition groups, it is usually put in charge of one of the closest collaborators of the President. The Costa Rican intelligence agency, the Directorate of Intelligence and Security, reports to the Ministry of the Presidency, which has generated controversy.

Said portfolio is one of the most important in the Costa Rican presidential cabinet. The Minister of the Presidency has among its functions to coordinate inter-ministerial and inter-institutional work, to be an interlocutor between the President and the Parliament together with other tasks similar to those that in other countries fall on a Chief of Cabinet or Prime Minister, so usually a person of extreme confidence of the President is appointed. The Minister of the Presidency, who is appointed by the President of Costa Rica through a presidential decree, has, among some of his functions, the coordination of inter-ministerial and inter-institutional work, being an interlocutor between the President and the Legislative Assembly, along with other similar tasks.

It is not unusual, too, that a few former presidential ministers have been later elected presidents of the Republic. The Minister of the Presidency, however, is not head of government, as Costa Rica's Constitution establishes that the President is both head of state and head of government.

The headquarters of the Ministry of the Presidency are located in Casa Presidencial in Zapote District, San José.

== List of ministers ==
Ministers of the Presidency
No.	Minister	Period	Party	President
1	Mario Quirós Sasso	1962-1966	National Liberation Party	Francisco Orlich Bolmarcich
2	Diego Trejos Fonseca	1966-1970	National Unification Party	José Joaquín Trejos
3	Miguel Ángel Rodríguez Echeverría	1970	National Unification Party	José Joaquín Trejos
4	Luis Alberto Monge Álvarez	1970-1974	National Liberation Party	José Figueres Ferrer
5	Wilburg Jiménez Castro	1975-1976	National Liberation Party	Daniel Oduber Quirós
6	Fernando Volio Jiménez	1977-1978	National Liberation Party	Daniel Oduber Quirós
7	José Rafael Cordero Croceri	1978-1982	Unity Coalition	Rodrigo Carazo Odio
8	Fernando Berrocal Soto	1982-1984	National Liberation Party	Luis Alberto Monge Álvarez
9	Danilo Jiménez Veiga	1984-1986	National Liberation Party	Luis Alberto Monge Álvarez
10	Rodrigo Arias Sánchez	1986-1990	National Liberation Party	Óscar Arias Sánchez
11	Rodolfo Méndez Mata	1990-1991	Social Christian Unity Party	Rafael Ángel Calderón Fournier
12	Rolando Laclé Castro	1991-1994	Social Christian Unity Party	Rafael Ángel Calderón Fournier
13	Rodrigo Oreamuno Blanco	1994-1996	National Liberation Party	José María Figueres Olsen
14	Marco Antonio Vargas Díaz	1996-1998	National Liberation Party	José María Figueres Olsen
15	Roberto Tovar Faja	1998-1999	Social Christian Unity Party	Miguel Ángel Rodríguez Echeverría
16	Danilo Chaverri Soto	1999-2002	Social Christian Unity Party	Miguel Ángel Rodríguez Echeverría
17	Ricardo Toledo Carranza	2002-2006	Social Christian Unity Party	Abel Pacheco de la Espriella
18	Rodrigo Arias Sánchez	2006-2010	National Liberation Party	Óscar Arias Sánchez
19	Marco Antonio Vargas Díaz	2010-2011	National Liberation Party	Laura Chinchilla Miranda
20	Carlos Ricardo Benavides Jiménez	2011-2014	National Liberation Party	Laura Chinchilla Miranda
21	Melvin Jiménez Marín	2014-2015	Citizens' Action Party	Luis Guillermo Solís Rivera
22	Sergio Alfaro Salas	2015-2018	Citizens' Action Party	Luis Guillermo Solís Rivera
23	Rodolfo Piza Rocafort	2018-2019	Social Christian Unity Party	Carlos Alvarado Quesada
24	Víctor Morales Mora	2019-2020	Citizens' Action Party	Carlos Alvarado Quesada
25	Marcelo Prieto Jiménez	2020-2021	National Liberation Party	Carlos Alvarado Quesada
26	Geannina Dinarte Romero	2021-2022	Citizens' Action Party	Carlos Alvarado Quesada
27	Natalia Díaz Quintana	2022-2024	United We Can	Rodrigo Chaves Robles
28	Laura Fernández Delgado	2024–2025; 2026	Christian Democratic Alliance	Rodrigo Chaves Robles
29	Rodrigo Chaves Robles	2026–present	Independent	Laura Fernández Delgado
