= Eduardo Cruickshank Smith =

Costa Rican politician (1958–2025)

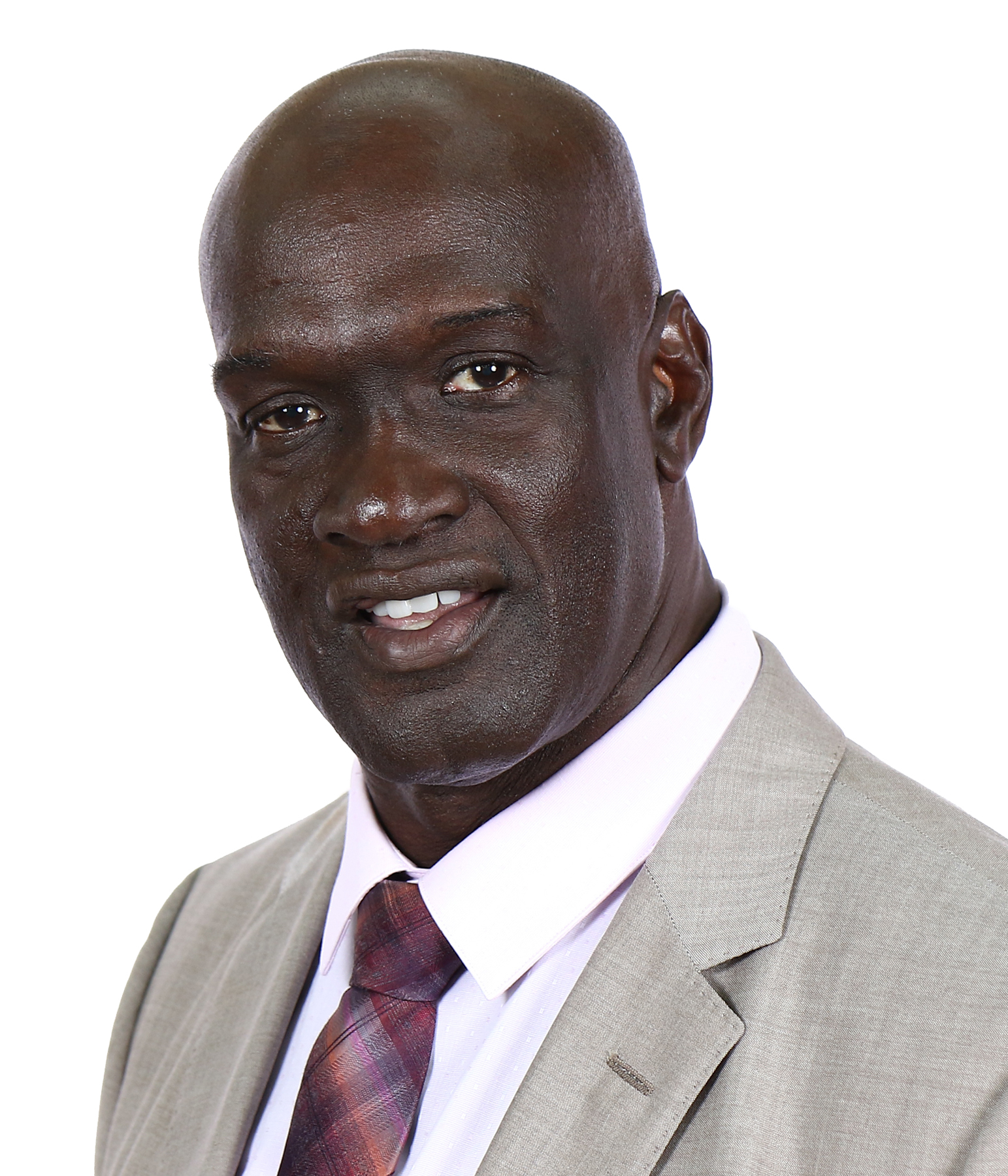

President of the Legislative Assembly of Costa Rica
- In office 1 May 2020 – 30 April 2021
- Preceded by: Carlos Ricardo Benavides Jiménez
- Succeeded by: Silvia Hernández Sánchez

Deputy of the Legislative Assembly of Costa Rica
- In office 1 May 2018 – 30 April 2022
- Preceded by: Danny Hayling Carcache
- Succeeded by: Geison Valverde Méndez
- Constituency: Limón (1st Office)

President of the Municipal Council of Limón
- In office 1 May 1995 – 30 April 1996

Alderman of the Municipal Council of Limón
- In office 1 May 1994 – 30 April 1998

Personal details
- Born: Eduardo Cruickshank Smith; 29 January 1958 Limón, Costa Rica
- Died: 5 March 2025 (aged 67)
- Party: Social Christian Unity Party (1994–2015); National Restoration Party (2015–2025)

Eduardo Cruickshank Smith (29 January 1958 – 5 March 2025) was a Costa Rican politician, Evangelical pastor, lawyer, and notary who was the former President of the Costa Rican parliament, a position he held from 2020 to 2021. He was the first Afro-Costa Rican to ever hold that position.

== Background ==
Cruickshank was born in a Jamaican-Costa Rican family of 8 children. His brother Clinton Cruickshank Smith is also a politician, being a former legislator and former presidential candidate of the National Liberation Party. His father was a carpenter and his mother was a housewife.

Before entering politics, he was pastor at the Colina de su Gloria church in his hometown of Limón and had a degree in law from the University of Costa Rica. He was married to Jeannette Edwards and had two children: Jermaine Eduardo Cruickshank Edwards and Yocelyn Shavony Cruickshank Edwards. He was also a grandfather.

Cruickshank Smith died on 5 March 2025, after complications during a medical procedure. He was 67.

== Political career ==
Having been first elected to the Legislative assembly of Costa Rica in 2018, he was elected president of said assembly in 2020.

In the spring of 2021, Cruickshank announced his candidacy for the upcoming 2022 Costa Rican general election, running on an anti-corruption and pro-business campaign.
