= Margarita Bolaños =

Costa Rican politician

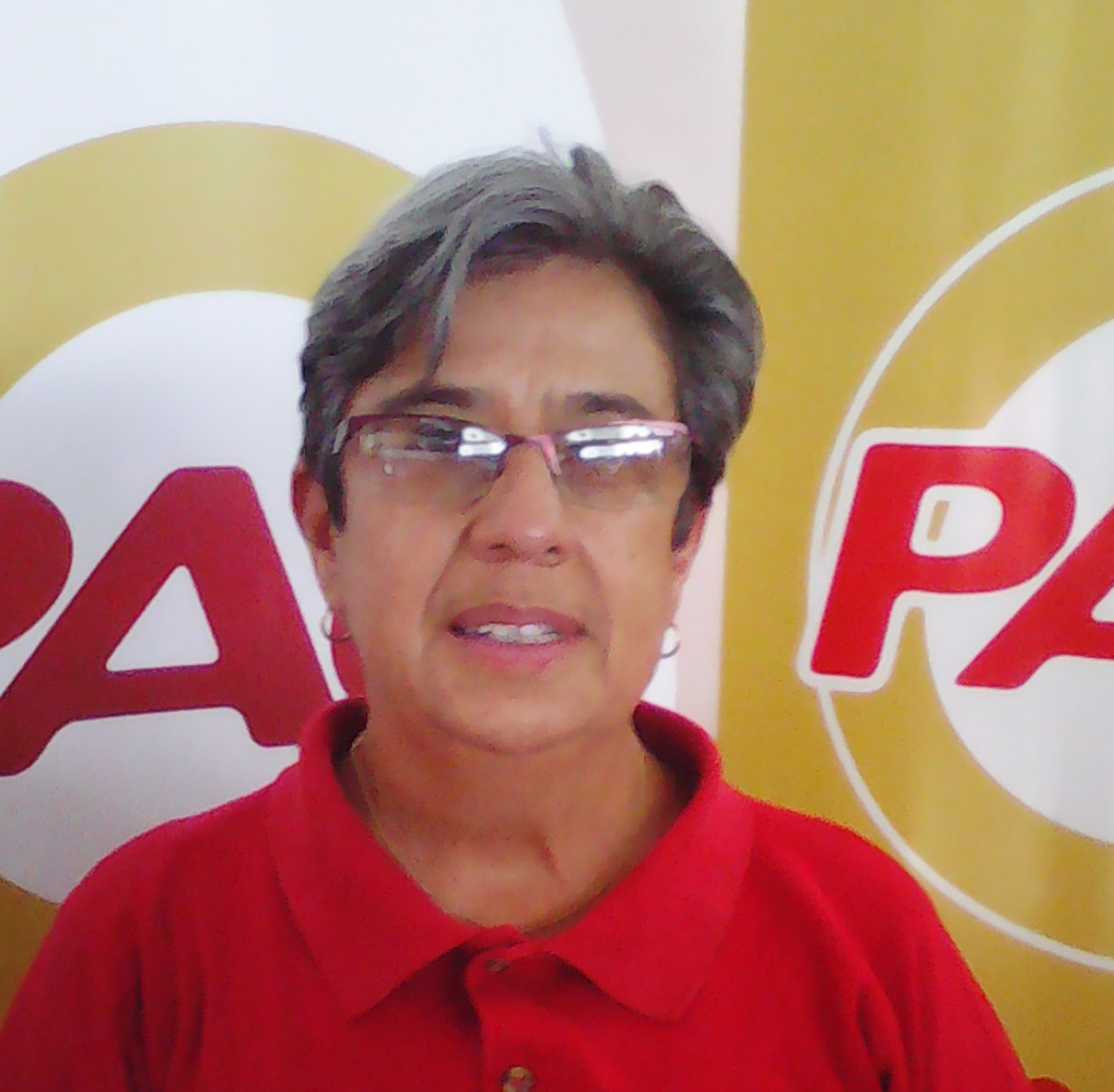

President of the Citizens' Action Party
- In office 2014–2017
- Preceded by: Rodrigo Alberto Carazo Zeledón
- Succeeded by: Marcia González Aguiluz

Secretary General of the Citizens' Action Party
- In office 2009–2013
- Preceded by: Teresita Aguilar
- Succeeded by: Olga Marta Sánchez Oviedo

Personal details
- Born: Margarita Bolaños Arquín; 1951 or 1952 (age 74–75)
- Party: Citizens' Action Party
- Profession: Politician; anthropologist

Margarita Bolaños Arquín (born 1951 or 1952) is a Costa Rican politician and anthropologist who was president of the Citizens' Action Party (PAC).

Bolaños studied anthropology at the University of Costa Rica and finished a master's degree at the University of Kansas in 1999. She has worked as a researcher and a teacher at the University of Chile and the University of Costa Rica.

Bolaños acted as secretary general of the PAC from 2009 to 2013. She became president of the party's National Executive Committee in August 2014, after Rodrigo Alberto Carazo resigned. Marcia González Aguiluz succeeded her as president in September 2017.
