= Silvia Hernández Sánchez =

Costa Rican economist and politician (born 1976)

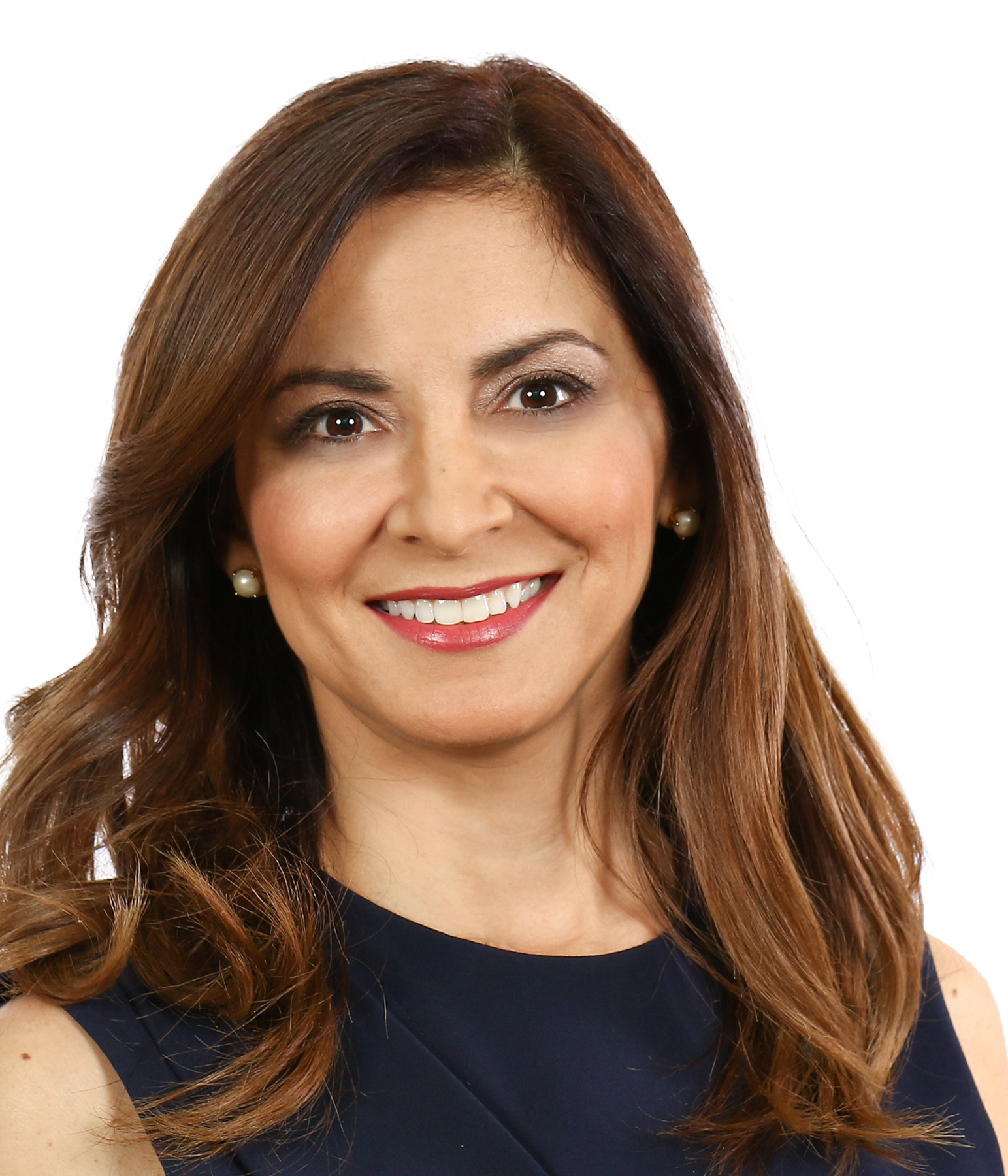
- Official portrait, 2018

59th President of the Legislative Assembly of Costa Rica
- In office 1 May 2021 – 30 April 2022
- Preceded by: Eduardo Cruickshank Smith
- Succeeded by: Rodrigo Arias Sánchez

Deputy of the Legislative Assembly of Costa Rica
- In office 1 May 2018 – 30 April 2022
- Preceded by: Epsy Campbell Barr
- Succeeded by: Andrea Álvarez Marín
- Constituency: San José (3rd Office)

Vice Minister of National Planning and Economic Policy
- In office 1 March 2012 – 8 May 2014
- President: Laura Chinchilla Miranda
- Preceded by: Melania Núñez Vargas
- Succeeded by: Luis Alfredo Fallas Calderón

Personal details
- Born: Silvia Vanessa Hernández Sánchez; 21 November 1976 (age 49) San José, Costa Rica
- Party: PLN
- Spouse: Rigoberto Zúñiga Calvo (m. 2008)
- Children: 1
- Education: Universidad Regiomontana (BA); Erasmus University Rotterdam (MA)

Silvia Vanessa Hernández Sánchez (born 21 November 1976) is a Costa Rican economist and politician who served as the 59th President of the Legislative Assembly from 2021 to 2022. A member of the National Liberation Party, she previously served as Vice Minister of National Planning from 2012 to 2014.

== Early life and education ==
Hernández was born in San José on November 21, 1976, the oldest of five children and only daughter of Freddy Hernández and María de los Ángeles Sánchez. Her paternal grandfather was a diplomat and deputy in the government of Daniel Oduber.

Hernández attended public school in Turrialba and Siquirres, before graduating from Bryant High School in Arkansas in 1996 through an exchange program. She studied at Universidad Regiomontana in Monterrey, Mexico, before completing a Bachelor of Economics at the Latin University of Costa Rica. While studying, she worked in a call center, and in 2002, she was hit by a car on her way home, breaking both legs and requiring spinal surgery. After spending six months in rehabilitation, she received a scholarship to study in The Netherlands. She has a Master of Arts in Development Economics from Erasmus University and a Masters in International Markets from the University of Salamanca.

== Career ==
Hernández is an economist, and has taught at Lead University in San José. From 2006 to 2007, she was an economic advisor to Vice President Kevin Casas Zamora.

Hernández was elected to the Legislative Assembly as a PLN deputy from San José. She worked as Deputy Minister of National Planning and Economic Policy in the government of Laura Chinchilla from 2012 to 2014. She has been president of the Tax Affair Commission, as well as a member of the Science, Technology and Education and OECD Special Commissions. In April 2019, she was elected chair of the National Liberation Party.

Hernández has published opinion pieces and analysis in La Republica, El Financiero and Dos Magazine.

Hernández was elected President of the Legislative Assembly on May 1, 2021, with 42 votes, and is the fourth woman to hold the position.

== Personal life ==
Hernández married Rigoberto Zúñiga, a real estate developer, in 2008 and lived in Cartago as of 2021. They have one daughter. She is Catholic.
