= Claudia Salinas =

Mexican model and actress

- Born: 19 August 1983 (age 42); Monterrey, Nuevo Leon, Mexico
- Occupations: model, actress, blogger
- Height: 5 ft 9 in (1.75 m)
- Website: www.claudiasalinas.com www.misssalinas.com

Claudia Salinas (/səˈliːnəs/ sə-LEE-nəs; born 19 August 1983) is a Mexican model and actress. As a fashion blogger she is known as Miss Salinas, which is the name of her blog.

== Career ==
She studied at the Lee Strasberg Theatre Institute in New York.

Salinas has appeared in major television and print ad campaigns for brands like BudLight, Calvin Klein, Yoplait, All State. She has also appeared in magazines including GQ, Maxim, FHM, Bello and Trace. She was featured as the cover girl for the June 2011 issue of FHM Indonesia.

Films with appearances by Salinas include Dirty Dancing: Havana Nights, Crossing Over, and the Mexican action comedy Salvando al Soldado Perez.

In 2011, she was named FHM's 100 Sexiest Women of 2011 at number 43.

== Personal life ==
Salinas was born in Monterrey, Nuevo Leon, Mexico.

Although she is fluent in English, her first language is Spanish. At the age of four, she began training as a ballet dancer. She performed in several ballet productions in her hometown Monterrey. Her parents, skeptical of a career as a dancer, encouraged her to go to college. Following her parents footsteps, both academics, she graduated from Industrial and Systems Engineering from the Universidad Regiomontana when she was 19.
