= Yara Jiménez =

Costa Rican lawyer and politician (born 1973)

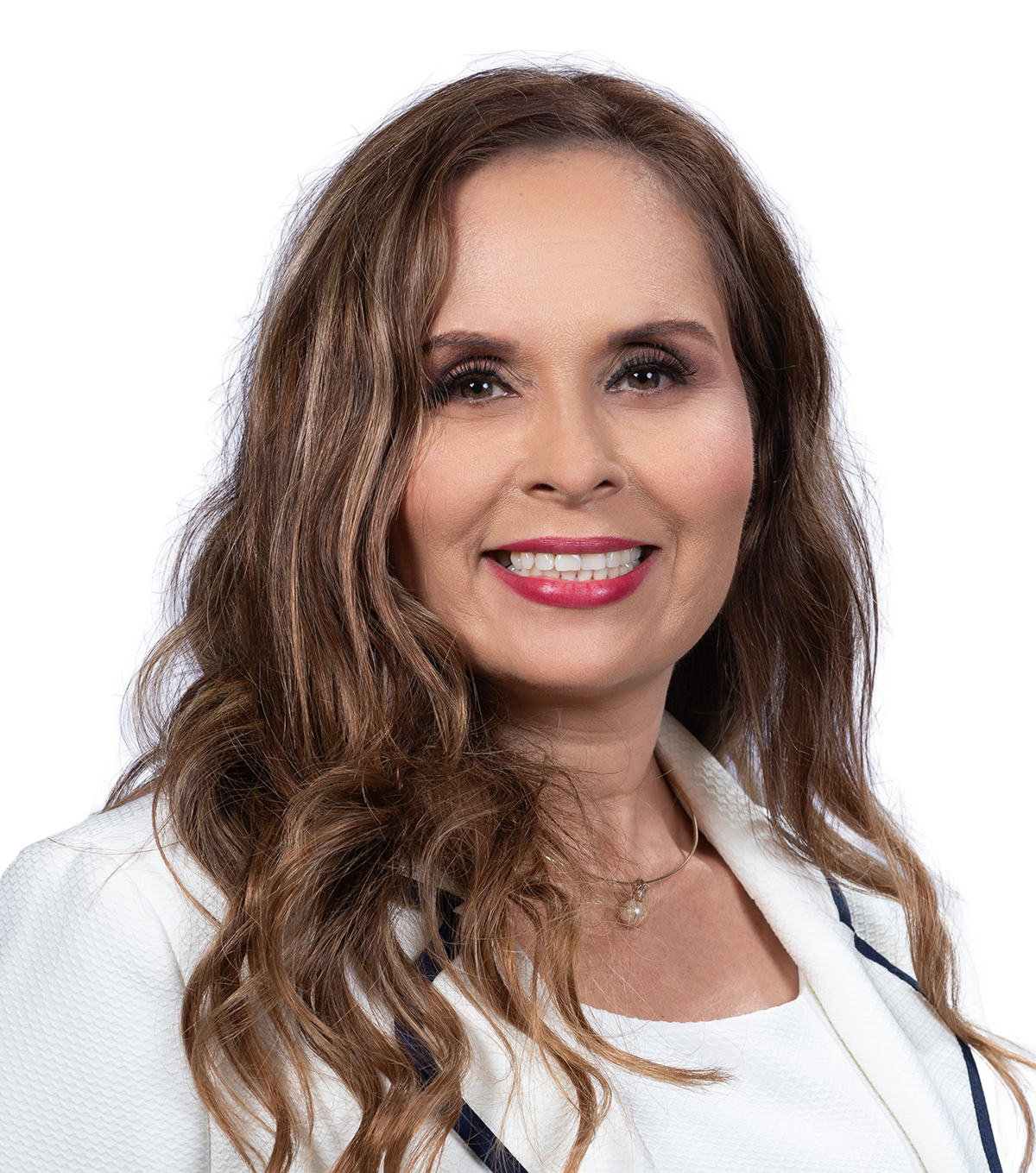
- Official portrait, 2026

61st President of the Legislative Assembly of Costa Rica
- Incumbent
- Assumed office 1 May 2026
- Preceded by: Rodrigo Arias Sánchez

Deputy of the Legislative Assembly of Costa Rica
- Incumbent
- Assumed office 1 May 2026
- Preceded by: Rosaura Méndez Gamboa
- Constituency: Cartago (3rd Office)

Personal details
- Born: Yara Vanessa Jiménez Fallas; 14 November 1973 (age 52) San Rafael Arriba, Costa Rica
- Party: PPSO
- Education: University of Costa Rica (LL.M.)

Yara Vanessa Jiménez Fallas (born 14 November 1973) is a Costa Rican lawyer and politician who has served as the 61st President of the Legislative Assembly since 2026. A member of the Sovereign People's Party, she previously served as Secretary of the Governing Council from 2022 to 2026.

== Biography ==
Jiménez was born on 14 November 1973 in San Rafael Arriba, Desamparados, Costa Rica. She obtained a law degree from the University of Costa Rica, where she also completed postgraduate studies in public law. She subsequently specialized in constitutional law at the University of Pisa in Italy.

Jiménez began her career in the public sector in 1995 as an assistant in the Legal Advisory Office of the Central Bank of Costa Rica. She later joined the Ministry of Finance, where she worked for approximately nine years in the General Directorate of Customs. During this period, she participated in the modernization of the National Customs System, including the transition from paper-based procedures to digital processes. She subsequently worked as a lawyer in the National Treasury and in the office of the Minister of Finance.

Jiménez was an advisor to the Costa Rican delegation at the Organisation for Economic Co-operation and Development. In this capacity, she participated in the monitoring of the country's implementation of recommendations associated with its membership in the organization.

From 2022 to 2026, Jiménez served as Secretary of the Governing Council during the presidency of Rodrigo Chaves. The position involved providing legal and administrative support to meetings of the cabinet, including responsibility for logistical coordination and the preparation and management of session records. During the same period, she served as head of the Advisory Unit on State Share Ownership and Management of Autonomous Institutions, a government body concerned with the state's ownership interests and its relationship with autonomous public institutions.
