= Universidad Regiomontana =

Private university in Monterrey, Mexico

Coordinates: 25.6710°N 100.3221°W

- Former names: Instituto Modelo de Enseñanza (1951-1969)
- Motto: Scientia et cultura pro homine
- Type: Private university
- Established: 1969
- Affiliations: ANUIES FIMPES
- Rector: Act. Ángel Casán Marcos
- Academic staff: 281
- Students: 8,004
- Undergraduates: 5,395
- Postgraduates: 1,005
- Other students: 1,700
- Location: Monterrey, Nuevo León, Mexico
- Colors: Green and Yellow
- Mascot: Jaguars
- Website: www.u-erre.mx

The Universidad Regiomontana (known by its shortened name U-ERRE, and previously by the abbreviation UR) is an institution of higher education in Monterrey, Mexico. This university has its origin in the Instituto Modelo de Educación (Model Education Institute), which was converted into a university by Eduardo Elizondo, a former governor of Nuevo León. In 1974 a group of entrepreneurs bought the university: Rogelio Sada Zambrano, Bernardo Garza Sada, Eugenio Garza Lagüera, Andrés Marcelo Sada, Hernán Rocha, Jorge Garza, Alfonso Garza, Rodolfo Barrera, Manuel Llaguno, Humberto Lobo, Alberto Santos de Hoyos, and Alberto Fernández Ruiloba.

The UR system has a secondary school and multiple campuses centrally located in the metropolitan area of Monterrey. At the undergraduate level there are three interconnected campuses and offices - Business Administration Aulas I (FACCEA), Humanities and Social Sciences Aulas II (FACHYCS), and Engineering and Architecture (FACIYA) Aulas III. 32 undergraduate degrees are offered, 10 of which are engineering degrees. The Graduate School also offers Master's degrees in Business Administration, Administration of Industrial Process, Administration of Safety and Occupational Health, Communications, Business Law, Fiscal Law, Labor Law, Private Law, Education, Electronics and Controls, Tourism Management, and Logistics. A number of programs are offered online.

It is considered the third most important private university in the region, competing with the Universidad de Monterrey.

== History ==
The university was founded on July 8, 1969.

In 2013, UR began a major restructuring under a board of directors headed by Ángel Casán Marcos. At this time, it adopted its present "U-ERRE" brand.

In 2017, the university began operating a radio station, XEJM-AM 1450, which is owned by Multimedios Radio.

== Programs and activities ==
The university offers a number of sports activities which have had notable competition, such as volleyball, baseball, soccer and taekwondo.

The university also offers a number of post-graduate degrees.

== Foreign exchange ==
The university is a member of the International Student Exchange Program (ISEP) and offers bilateral student exchange programs with other universities around the globe such as Germany, Liechtenstein, France, United States, Australia, Spain, Chile, Argentina, Colombia, and Saudi Arabia. It will soon be opening an exchange program with Ireland, United Kingdom, South Korea, Japan, and New Zealand.

== Prestigious awards and rankings ==
- GATE certified the virtual master program; the UR was the first university in Latin America to be certified.
- FIMPES (Federation of Private Mexican Universities)
- ISO 9001:2000
- Certification for quality from the Consejo de Acreditación de la Enseñanza de la Ingeniería (CACEI, Industrial Teaching Accreditation Council).
- The department of Administración de Empresas Turísticas (Tourism Management) received accreditation of the Consejo Nacional para la Calidad de la Educación Turística (CONAET, National Council for the Quality of Touristic Education).

== Notable alumni ==
- Rodrigo Medina de la Cruz, Governor of Nuevo León from 2009 to 2015
- Juan Carlos Pérez Góngora, former federal deputy
- Adal Ramones, comedian and actor
- Claudia Salinas, fashion model and actress
- Silvia Hernández Sánchez, President of the Legislative Assembly of Costa Rica
- Rocío Heredia, visual artist
- Mario Ortega, journalist
