= Miguel Ángel Rodríguez =

President of Costa Rica from 1998 to 2002

Miguel Ángel Rodríguez OYC MROU
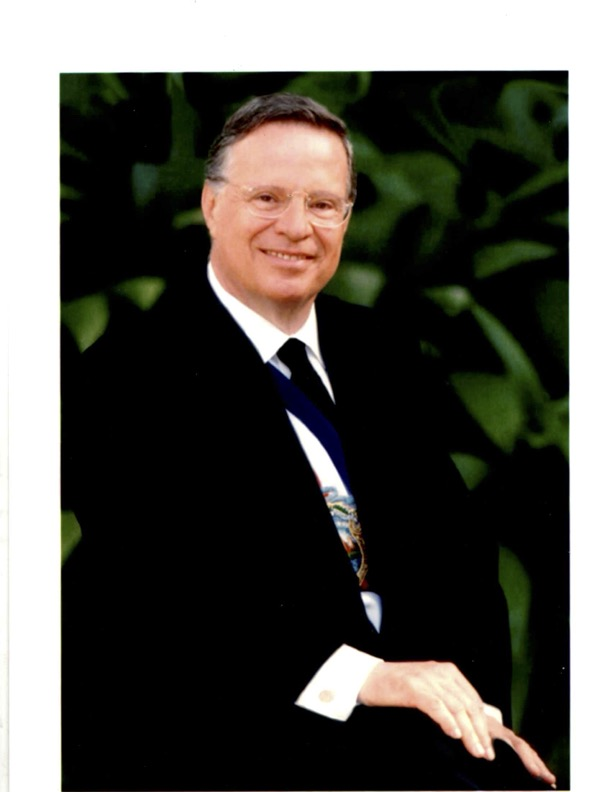
- Official portrait, 1998

8th Secretary General of the Organization of American States
- In office 15 September 2004 – 15 October 2004
- Preceded by: César Gaviria
- Succeeded by: Luigi R. Einaudi (acting)

43rd President of Costa Rica
- In office 8 May 1998 – 8 May 2002
- Vice President: Astrid Fischel Volio; Elizabeth Odio Benito
- Preceded by: José María Figueres
- Succeeded by: Abel Pacheco

33rd President of the Legislative Assembly of Costa Rica
- In office 1 May 1991 – 30 April 1992
- Preceded by: Juan José Trejos Fonseca
- Succeeded by: Roberto Tovar Faja

Deputy of the Legislative Assembly of Costa Rica
- In office 1 May 1990 – September 1993
- Preceded by: Fernando Volio Jiménez
- Succeeded by: Alberto Cañas Escalante
- Constituency: San José (1st Office)

Minister of the Presidency of Costa Rica
- In office 1 April – 8 May 1970
- President: José Joaquín Trejos
- Preceded by: Diego Trejos Fonseca
- Succeeded by: Carlos Coto Albán

Director of the Office of National Planning
- In office 8 April 1969 – 1 April 1970
- President: José Joaquín Trejos
- Preceded by: Alberto Di Mare Fuscado
- Succeeded by: Marco López Agüero

Alternate Director of the Office of National Planning
- In office 8 May 1966 – 8 April 1969
- President: José Joaquín Trejos

Personal details
- Born: 9 January 1940 (age 86) San José, Costa Rica
- Party: PUSC (from 1983)
- Other political affiliations: Unity Coalition (1976–1983); National Unification Party (1966–1976)
- Spouse: Lorena Clare Facio (m. 1962; died 2026)
- Children: 3
- Education: University of Costa Rica; University of California, Berkeley (PHD)
- Occupation: Economist; lawyer; businessman; politician; professor; writter
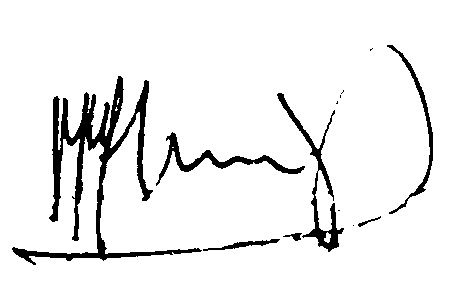
- Signature
- Website: Official website

Miguel Ángel Rodríguez Echeverría (born 9 January 1940) is a Costa Rican economist, lawyer, businessman and politician who served as the 43rd President of Costa Rica from 1998 to 2002. A liberal member of the Social Christian Unity Party, he has remained active as a writer and columnist since leaving public office.

Before the presidency, Rodríguez served as Minister of Planning from 1968 to 1970 and as Minister of the Presidency in 1970 during the administration of José Joaquín Trejos Fernández. He was also a member of the board of the Central Bank of Costa Rica from 1966 to 1969, and served as a deputy in the Legislative Assembly of Costa Rica from 1990 to 1994, including as president of the assembly from 1991 to 1992.

In 2004, Rodríguez was elected Secretary General of the Organization of American States. He later voluntarily resigned from the post to return to Costa Rica and face allegations of financial misconduct related to his presidential administration, including accusations that he had received bribes from the French company Alcatel in connection with telecommunications contracts. On 27 April 2011, he was sentenced to five years in prison. However, the ruling was overturned in December 2012 by an appeals court, which acquitted him of all charges.

Rodríguez was elected to the presidency with an agenda that included opening state-run monopolies in insurance and telecommunications, restructuring the public sector through a greater private-sector role in infrastructure, trade liberalization, and the expansion and modernization of the welfare system. Proposed reforms to the insurance and telecommunications sectors provoked the 2000 Costa Rican protests and were abandoned at the time, though similar measures were later implemented after Costa Rica joined the CAFTA-DR in 2009.

== Early life ==
Miguel Ángel Rodríguez Echeverría was born on 9 January 1940 in San José, to Manuel Rodríguez Támara, a Colombian immigrant of Asturian descent, and Blanca Echeverría Velázquez.

At the University of Costa Rica, he earned degrees in economics in 1962 and law in 1963, and briefly worked there as an assistant professor of economics. He later continued his studies at the University of California, Berkeley, where he obtained both a Master of Arts and a PhD in economics in 1966, completing a dissertation on monetary policy. Immediately after graduating, Rodríguez returned to Costa Rica to serve as Minister of Planning and as a member of the board of directors of the Central Bank of Costa Rica during the administration of fellow economist President José Joaquín Trejos Fernández.

During the 1970s and 1980s, Rodríguez combined academic work as a professor of economics at the University of Costa Rica and the Autonomous University of Central America with private business activity in cattle ranching through Grupo Ganadero Industrial, S.A.

Rodríguez was married to Lorena Clare Facio, who died of pancreatic cancer in 2026. He is also a practicing Roman Catholic. His brother, Álvaro Rodríguez Echeverría, served as Superior General of the De La Salle Brothers from 2000 to 2014.

== Political career ==
Rodríguez was elected to the Legislative Assembly in 1990 as a deputy for San José Province, heading the Social Christian Unity Party (PUSC) list in the province. He was later elected president of the Legislative Assembly, serving from 1991 to 1992.

Rodríguez sought the presidency three times. In 1990, he lost his party's nomination to Rafael Ángel Calderón Fournier. In 1994, he won the PUSC nomination but was defeated in the general election by José María Figueres Olsen. He was finally elected President of Costa Rica in 1998 alongside a ticket that became the first in the country's history to feature two women elected as vice presidents, although his party fell two seats short of a legislative majority.

His administration promoted market-oriented reforms, including a proposal to end the state monopoly on telecommunications. These measures faced strong opposition from public-sector unions and other groups, and several were ultimately abandoned. His government did, however, secure passage of the Worker Protection Law, which established a multi-pillar pension system and expanded private-sector participation in retirement savings. It also granted a concession for the operation of the Pacific port of Puerto Caldera to a private company.

Rodríguez's administration also enacted the Responsible Paternity Law, a measure aimed at strengthening legal protections for mothers and children. The law allowed single, widowed, or divorced mothers to identify an alleged father when registering a child, thereby expediting paternity recognition and claims for child support. If the alleged father failed to appear after being offered a free DNA test, paternity could be legally presumed, and the child registered with his surname.

After leaving office, Rodríguez worked as a consultant for Manatt Jones Global Strategies and served as a visiting professor at George Washington University in Washington, D.C..

=== Political views ===
Rodríguez has generally been regarded as a supporter of free enterprise and market-oriented economic policies. Throughout his political career, he favored structural reforms, trade liberalization, and opening the Costa Rican economy to foreign investment.

Rodríguez has also been described as socially conservative. In 1998, he drew criticism from LGBT organizations after opposing a planned gay and lesbian festival in the beach resort town of Quepos, on Costa Rica's central Pacific coast. At the time, Rodríguez was quoted in the press as saying "It is important that the appropriate authorities not grant any permits for any type of public activities associated with the gay/lesbian festival".

His position was supported by Archbishop Román Arrieta Villalobos of San José and by Father Minor de Jesús Calvo, a conservative priest and television presenter. In response, Triángulo Rosa, an LGBT rights organization led by Francisco Madrigal, filed complaints before the complaints division of the Supreme Court of Costa Rica against Arrieta and Calvo, and also submitted a complaint to the Defensoría de los Habitantes, Costa Rica's ombudsman institution, against Rodríguez.

== Secretary-General of the Organization of American States ==
On 7 June 2004 he was unanimously elected to replace César Gaviria as secretary general of the OAS. He began his term on 15 September 2004 but served only 1 month, before stepping down when a former political collaborator accused him of having accepted a kickback from the French telecommunications firm Alcatel, which had been awarded a large government contract for cellular phone bandwidth during Rodríguez's tenure as president.

On 8 October 2004, Rodríguez resigned as OAS Secretary General, effective 15 October, and was replaced by Assistant Secretary General Luigi Einaudi, a former U.S. State Department official who assumed the title of Acting Secretary General. After resigning from his post, Rodríguez returned to Costa Rica on 15 October 2004 and was placed first under house arrest and two weeks later in jail, pending further investigations.

== Accusations of involvement in corruption scandals ==
=== Political contributions from Carlos Hank ===
In 1997, while Rodríguez was a candidate for the presidency of Costa Rica, he met Carlos Hank González, a Mexican PRI politician and businessman. Media reports later alleged that Rodríguez had accepted campaign contributions from Hank, despite Costa Rican law prohibiting foreign donations to political campaigns. Some international coverage also referred to allegations linking Hank to organized crime, though such claims remained controversial and were not judicially established. Rodríguez denied any wrongdoing, and he was not criminally charged in connection with the matter.

=== Payments from Taiwan ===
News reports claimed that Rodríguez had also received $1.4 million from the government of Taiwan. This amount was deposited in Panama in an account controlled by the firm Inversiones Denisse S.A., a consulting firm that allegedly belonged to Rodríguez. His lawyers claim that Rodríguez was no longer the owner of Inversiones Denisse when the payments took place. The motivation for the Taiwanese government payments is unknown. Taiwanese officials, however, have recognized that their cooperation with allies led to corruption in some cases. President Ma Ying-jeou promised to end what he called "the diplomacy of the cheque book." In 2007 Oscar Arias recognizing China's economic growth ended Costa Rican recognition of Taiwan.

=== Payments from reinsurers ===
On 22 October 2010, British media reported that Julian Messent, a former executive of the reinsurance firm PWS, owned by Lord Pearson, had pleaded guilty in Southwark Crown Court to paying £1.2 million in bribes to three Costa Rican officials in exchange for contracts with the state insurance monopoly, the Instituto Nacional de Seguros (INS). The money was reportedly disbursed in 41 payments between 1999 and 2002. Messent was sentenced to 21 months in prison. According to the sentence, Messent should pay a fine of US$160,000 to the Costa Rican state.

Costa Rican media speculated that the unnamed officials could have included Rodríguez, former INS president Cristóbal Zawadski, and former INS reinsurance director Álvaro Acuña Prado. The matter became known in Costa Rica as the Caso reaseguros.

Rodríguez, Zawadski, Prado, and several others were already under investigation in Costa Rica after reports that PWS had transferred at least US$200,000 to Inversiones Denisse, a Panamanian company owned by Rodríguez. Prosecutors alleged that PWS had inflated insurance policies of the Instituto Costarricense de Electricidad (ICE) in order to create a discretionary fund of US$1.6 million. At the time of the alleged operation, ICE was headed by Rafael Sequeira, the father-in-law of Rodríguez's son. Another reinsurer said to have made payments to Rodríguez's company was the Mexico-based firm Guy Carpenter Reinmex.

On 30 July 2013, the Prosecutor's Office requested the opening of a judicial investigation into alleged embezzlement involving Rodríguez, according to the weekly newspaper The Tico Times. The investigation also included Cristóbal Zawadzki Wojtasiak and Álvaro Acuña Prado. Rodríguez rejected the accusations in a press release, describing them as political persecution and stating that he would contest them in court. He also asserted that prosecutors had previously sought dismissal of the case in 2005.

In August 2025, it was reported that although a definitive dismissal had previously been issued in Rodríguez's favor, that ruling had been appealed, and an interim judge subsequently ordered the case to proceed to trial. Rodríguez's lawyer again denied the charges and criticized the lengthy proceedings, noting that the matter had already been ongoing for 24 years.

=== ICE-Alcatel scandal ===
Rodríguez was tried in Costa Rica for allegedly receiving more than US$800,000 in payments from Alcatel, a French telecommunications company, in exchange for helping the company receive a government contract to provide 400,000 cell phone lines. In 2007, Christian Sapsizian, a former adjunct to the vice president of Alcatel for Latin America, pleaded guilty in the U.S. District Court of Miami to violating the Foreign Corrupt Practices Act by conspiring with Edgar Valverde (the president of Alcatel in Costa Rica) to bribe an "official" of the Costa Rican Institute of Electricity (ICE) and a "senior government official" of Costa Rica. Mr. Sapsizian was sentenced to 30 months in prison, three years of supervised release, and forfeiture of $261,500.

The prosecution in Costa Rica alleges that the "senior government official" was President Rodríguez, and that the ICE official was José Antonio Lobo, who has agreed to testify against Rodríguez in exchange for immunity from prosecution. Valverde, Rodríguez, and seven other people were tried in Costa Rica for their alleged involvement in the kickback scheme. After long delays, the trial began in April 2010. The trial took many months, because 110 witnesses appeared before the judges. On 28 April 2011, Rodríguez Echeverría was sentenced to 5 years in prison for his participation in the kickback scheme. Moreover, he will not be able to serve in public office during 12 years. The other defendants were also found guilty and received sentences ranging from two to 15 years of prison.

In 2010 Alcatel-Lucent agreed to pay a fine of US$137.4 million to avoid US prosecution for alleged bribes paid in several countries, including Kenya, Taiwan and Costa Rica. In a separate deal with Costa Rican government, Alcatel-Lucent also agreed to pay a fine of US$10 million. The agreement with the Procuraduría General de la República, the legal representative of the Costa Rican state, is intended to compensate for the social damage brought about by the kickback scheme. Originally, the Procuraduria had demand a compensation of US$60 million. Reportedly, the Procuraduría will also pursue compensation from other people currently on trial. The compensation sought amounts to US$52 million.

In July 2015 it was reported in the international media that Alcatel-Lucent (name of the company after a merger with Lucent Technologies) had agreed to make an additional payment of US$10 million to the Costa Rican government. According to these reports, discussions on the settlement have been dragging on for years. However, on 8 June 2015 Alcatel agreed with the Instituto Costarricense de Electricidad (ICE) to pay to the latter US$10 million to settle the question. It has also been reported that Alcatel-Lucent has budgeted US$52 million to pay for civil action concerning legal prosecution of its former managers in the country.

== Sentence ==
On 27 April 2011 he was sentenced to 5 years in prison. In 2012 the sentence was revoked amid accusation of prosecutor misconduct. The appellation tribunal found that Lobo, the crown's prosecution witness was not only given immunity (even as from his own declaration he was the mastermind of the transactions) but was allowed to keep the money he obtain from the illegal transactions (an amount more than 3 times that of Rodriguez). Lobo also changed versions more than 7 times and the appellation tribunal found unusual that Rodriguez was accused using one version on the events but condemn using a different version, harming his ability to mount an effective defense.

Political offices
Preceded by José María Figueres	President of Costa Rica; 1998–2002	Succeeded by Abel Pacheco
Diplomatic posts
Preceded by César Gaviria	Secretary General of the Organization of American States; 2004	Succeeded by Luigi R. Einaudi acting
