= Marcos Díaz =

Marcos Díaz may refer to:

- Marcos Díaz (footballer), Argentine footballer
- Marcos Díaz (swimmer), Dominican swimmer
- Marcos Diaz (Eclipse), a fictional character in the American TV show The Gifted

== See also ==
- Marco Diaz (disambiguation)
