= Leila Rodríguez Stahl =

First Lady of Costa Rica
- In role May 8, 2002 – May 8, 2006
- President: Abel Pacheco
- Preceded by: Lorena Clare Facio
- Succeeded by: Vacant (2006–2010)

Personal details
- Born: March 30, 1942 (age 84) San José, Costa Rica
- Spouse: Abel Pacheco (m. 1975–present)

Leila Rodríguez Stahl (born March 30, 1942 San José, Costa Rica) is a Costa Rican politician, painter, sculptor and beauty pageant titleholder who was winner of the Miss Costa Rica 1960 and then represented Costa Rica at Miss Universe 1960. She served as the First Lady of Costa Rica from 2002 until 2006 during the presidency of her husband, Abel Pacheco.

== Biography ==
Rodriguez was born to Yurán Rodríguez Rodríguez and Leila Stahl Navarro in San José, Costa Rica on March 30, 1942. She is the third of her parents four children. Rodriguez attended primary school at Escuela Vitalia Madrigal. She initially enrolled at Colegio Superior de Señoritas for secondary school, but later transferred to Colegio Sagrado Corazón de Jesús in San José. She then attended Escuela Boston and the American Business Academy. Rodriguez also studied art and painting at a school in Chicago, Illinois, where she lived for five years.

Rodríguez married Abel Pacheco, the future President of Costa Rica, on November 20, 1975. Rodríguez and Pacheco had one son, Fabian. Abel Pacheco also had five children from his first marriage: Abel, Elsa, Yolanda, Sergio and Valeria.

She held at least four major art exhibitions during the 1990s, including two at the Club Unión in 1991 and 1995, the Galería Valanti in 1993, and an exhibition called III Encuentro de Primeras Damas de América y el Caribe in 1993. A retrospective of her work, Paisajes y bodegones, featuring landscape paintings and still lifes, opened at the Cultural Center of Chile in Los Yoses, Costa Rica, on October 25, 2002.

Rodríguez served as First Lady of Costa Rica from 2002 to 2006. Under Rodríguez, the Office of First Lady promoted Costa Rican history and national identity by focusing on three areas: culture, beautification and the arts, and the environment. The focus of her program, which was extended nationwide, varied depending on the local culture and history of the individual cantons. Her office also coordinated other programs, including an eye clinic and construction of a school for children with neurological disabilities, and supported four foundations: Mundo Solidario, Mundo de Opportunidades, Mundo de Luz, and Cadena Mayor. The Office of First Lady receives no national funding from the government of Costa Rica. In response, Rodríguez solicited private donations to fund her programs and hired some of the office's 60 person staff pro bono.
