= Natalia Díaz Quintana =

Costa Rican politician (born 1984)

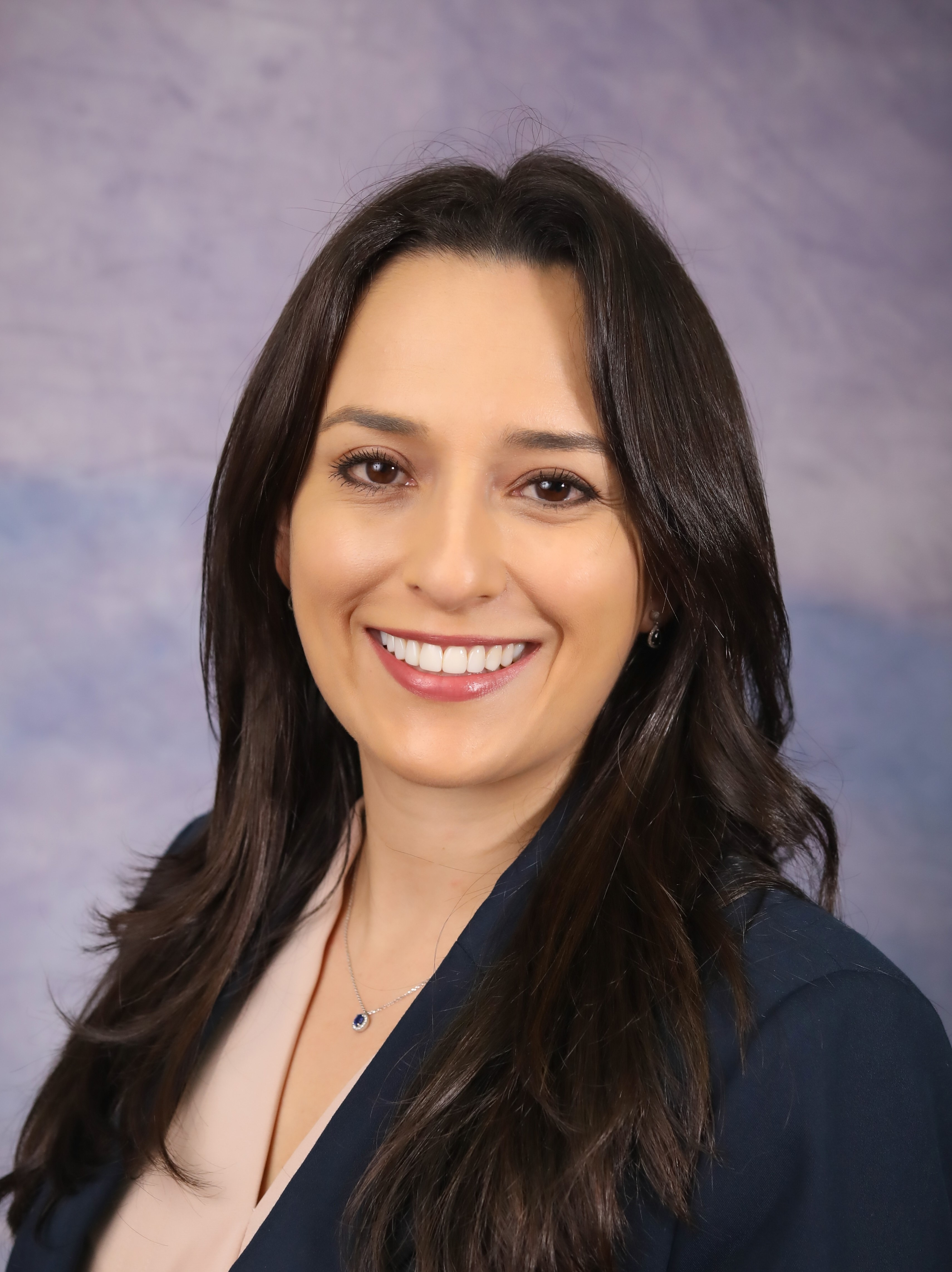
- Official portrait, 2022

Minister of the Presidency of Costa Rica
- In office 8 May 2022 – 22 June 2024
- President: Rodrigo Chaves
- Preceded by: Geannina Dinarte Romero
- Succeeded by: Laura Fernández

President of United We Can
- In office 28 November 2018 – 29 April 2022

Vice President of the Legislative Assembly of Costa Rica
- In office 1 May 2017 – 30 April 2018

Personal details
- Born: November 25, 1984 (age 41)
- Party: United We Can
- Education: Latin University of Costa Rica

Natalia Díaz Quintana (born 25 November 1984) is a Costa Rican publicist and politician. She served as the Minister of the Presidency from 2022 to 2024.

The daughter of Dr. Jorge Díaz Salazar, Díaz attended the Latin University of Costa Rica. She got her start in politics as a member of the Movimiento Libertario at the age of 19. Díaz was elected to the Legislative Assembly in 2014 representing San José, Costa Rica.

In 2026, she ran for President of Costa Rica and received 21,492 votes, or less than 1 percent of the total.
