= Ricardo Toledo =

Costa Rican politician

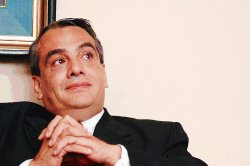

Ricardo Toledo is a Costa Rican politician and a member of the Christian democratic Social Christian Unity Party (PUSC). He was their candidate for president in the 2006 elections and got 3.430% of the total votes (this is a preliminary value).

Following that result, some commentators have claimed that PUSC has become a minor political force in the country.
