= Abel Pacheco =

President of Costa Rica from 2002 to 2006

Abel Pacheco OSC OSP
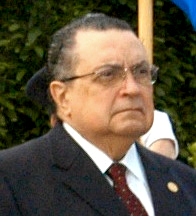
- Pacheco in 2005

44th President of Costa Rica
- In office 8 May 2002 – 8 May 2006
- Vice President: Lineth Saborío Chaverri; Luis Fishman Zonzinski
- Preceded by: Miguel Ángel Rodríguez
- Succeeded by: Óscar Arias

Deputy of the Legislative Assembly of Costa Rica
- In office 1 May 1998 – 30 April 2002
- Preceded by: Alberto Cañas Escalante
- Succeeded by: Édgar Mohs Villalta
- Constituency: San José (1st Office)

Personal details
- Born: Abel Pacheco de la Espriella; 22 December 1933 (age 92) San José, Costa Rica
- Party: PUSC
- Spouse(s): Elsa María Muñoz Batha (?–?) Leila Rodríguez Stahl (m. 1975)
- Children: 6
- Education: National Autonomous University of Mexico; Louisiana State University
- Occupation: Psychiatrist; businessman; media personality; politician; writer

Abel Pacheco de la Espriella (/əˈbɛl pəˈtʃeɪkoʊ/ ə-BEL pə-CHAY-koh; born 22 December 1933) is a Costa Rican psychiatrist and retired politician who served as the 44th President of Costa Rica from 2002 to 2006. A member of the Social Christian Unity Party, he campaigned on a platform of continuing free-market reforms and implementing an austerity program. He was also the first president of Costa Rica to be elected in a runoff election.

== Biography ==
=== Early life ===
Abel Pacheco and his first wife, Elsa María Muñoz Batha, had five children: Abel, Elsa, Yolanda, Sergio and Valeria. Pacheco married his second wife, Leila Rodríguez Stahl, a former Miss Costa Rica winner, on 20 November 1975. He and Rodríguez had one son, Fabian.

=== Career ===
Pacheco is a medical doctor who graduated from Universidad Nacional Autónoma de México with a degree in psychiatry from Louisiana State University.

During the 1970s, 1980s, and 1990s Pacheco was a popular presenter of short programmes on Costa Rican television. During this time he continued to teach at the University of Costa Rica and personally attended to customers at the gentleman's outfitters, El Palacio del Pantalón, that he had established in downtown San José in the mid-1980s. He also wrote a series of novels and a number of popular songs.

On 1 February 1998 he was elected to serve as a party-list deputy in Costa Rica's unicameral Legislative Assembly, representing the province of San José for the PUSC.

In the run-up to the 2002 presidential election, the PUSC party convention selected him to be its candidate by an overwhelming 76% of the delegates' votes on 10 June 2001. His candidacy was seen as a victory for the rank-and-file members over the party's entrenched hierarchy.

In the first round of the election Pacheco received 38.6% of the vote: just short of the 40% needed to avoid a run-off. On 7 April 2002, in the second round – the first time the mechanism had been used since the rules were introduced – Pacheco got 58% of the vote, beating Rolando Araya of the social democratic PLN by a narrow margin.

== Books ==
Pacheco is the author of a number of books, including both, fiction and non-fiction. Among other titles of the books that he penned are: Paso de tropa (1969), and Más abajo de la piel (1972). His work has been translated to more than 20 different languages, given its importance to Costa Rican cultural heritage.

Abel Pacheco was awarded with the prize "Citizen of the World" for his valuable contribution to culture and literature around the world.

== Honours ==
=== Foreign honours ===
- Italy
  - (Kingdom of the Two Sicilies) Two Sicilian Royal Family: Knight Grand Cross of Merit of the Two Sicilian Royal Sacred Military Constantinian Order of Saint George
- Monaco: Knight Grand Cross of the Order of Saint-Charles (21 November 2003)
- Pacheco has received several international awards for his literature work.
- Citizen of the World international award, given to exemplary citizens that have had a major contribution to the culture and arts in the world.
- National Literature Prize for his book: "Mas abajo de la piel".
- Filantropic awards given his active contribution to Social Corporate Responsibility.

Assembly seats
Preceded by Alberto Cañas Escalante	Deputy of the Legislative Assembly of Costa Rica for San José's 1st office 1998–2002	Succeeded by Édgar Mohs Villalta
Party political offices
Preceded by Miguel Ángel Rodríguez	PUSC nominee for President of Costa Rica; 2002	Succeeded by Ricardo Toledo
Political offices
Preceded by Miguel Ángel Rodríguez	President of Costa Rica; 2002–2006	Succeeded by Óscar Arias
