= Olga Marta Sánchez Oviedo =

Costa Rican politician

Olga Marta Sánchez Oviedo was a Costa Rican politician and Minister of Planning. She was Secretary General of the Citizens' Action Party (PAC for its Spanish initials).

She held a doctorate in economics from the National Autonomous University of Mexico and a Master's in social science from the Facultad Latinoamericana de Ciencias Sociales (Latin American Social Science College). In addition, she was a licenciate from the University of Costa Rica.
