= Marco Vargas Díaz =

Marco Antonio Vargas Díaz (born August 17, 1948 in San José, Costa Rica), is a Costa Rican economist and politician, affiliated with the National Liberation Party, who has served as minister on three occasions.

He is the son of Marco Tulio Vargas Garita and Soledad Díaz Molina. On December 11, 1970, Vargas married Matilde Ruiz Baldioceda. The couple have three children, Vanessa, Mark, and Marcela Vargas Ruiz.

During the administration, Figueres Olsen (1994–1998) served as Minister of the Presidency, succeeding Rodrigo Oreamuno Blanco. Many observers, including major political figures within his own party, criticized the choice, pointing out that Vargas lacked the political skills needed for the job. During the second administration, Arias Sánchez (2006–2010), Vargas served as the Agency Coordinating Minister. He also assumed other ministerial posts during the same administration. He served as Minister of Production, replacing temporarily Alfredo Volio, who resigned from government to direct the campaign to approve the CAFTA-DR trade agreement in a referendum held for that purpose. For several months, he also replaced Karla González Carvajal as Minister of Public Works and Transport.

== Administration Chinchilla (2010–2014) ==
In May 2010, Marco Vargas was appointed Minister of the Presidency. Vargas confronted major challenges during his tenure as minister. Among other things, he approved a measure to double the salaries of law-makers. The initiative was very unpopular, forcing President Chinchilla to announce her veto in case that the law was approved. Reportedly, Vargas had had enormous difficulties dealing with parliamentarians, even those from his own party. By late March, 2011, Vargas suggested that he would be leaving the post of Minister of the Presidency. On April 4, 2011, President Laura Chinchilla Miranda announced Vargas' resignation, who was replaced by Tourism Minister Carlos Ricardo Benavides Jiménez.
