= Legislative Assembly of Costa Rica =

Unicameral legislature of Costa Rica

Legislative Assembly Asamblea Legislativa de la República de Costa Rica
- XX Legislature

Type
- Type: Unicameral

History
- Established: 8 November 1949
- Preceded by: Constitutional Congress

Leadership
- President: Yara Jiménez, PPSO since 1 May 2026
- Vice President: Esmeralda Britton González, PPSO since 1 May 2026
- First Secretary: Gerardo Bogantes Rivera, PPSO since 1 May 2026
- Second Secretary: Reynaldo Arias Mora, PPSO since 1 May 2026

Structure
- Seats: 57
- Political groups: Government (31): PPSO (31); Opposition (26): PLN (17); FA (7); PUSC (1); CAC (1)
- Committees: 6 ordinary standing: Agriculture and Natural Resources Committee; Economical Affairs Committee; Government and Administration Committee; Budget Affairs Committee; Judicial Affairs Committee; Social Affairs Committee; 14 special standing: Honors Committee; Municipal Affairs and Local Participatory Development Committee; Law Drafting Committee; International Relations and Foreign Trade Committee; Constitutionality Consultations Committee; Income and Public Spending Committee; Security and Drug Trafficking Committee; Women's Affairs Committee; Youth, Childhood and Teenagers Committee; Appointments Committee; Environment Committee; Tourism Committee; Human Rights Committee; Science, Technology and Education Committee

Elections
- Voting system: Party-list proportional representation (Closed list, Modified Hare quota)
- First election: 4 October 1949
- Last election: 1 February 2026
- Next election: By 2030

Meeting place
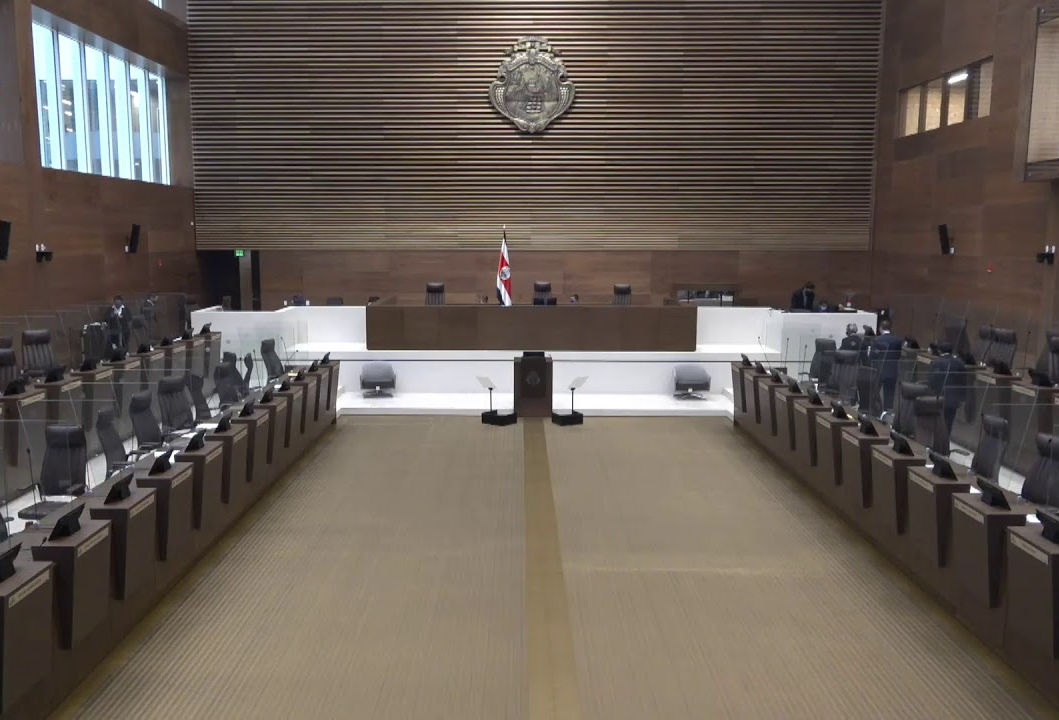
- Session room of the Asamblea Legislativa building

Website
- http://www.asamblea.go.cr/

Constitution
- Constitution of Costa Rica

The Legislative Assembly (Spanish: Asamblea Legislativa) forms the unicameral legislative branch of the Costa Rican government. The national congress building is located in the capital city, San José, specifically in the Carmen district.

The Legislative Assembly is composed of 57 deputies (Spanish: diputados), who are elected by direct, universal, popular vote on a closed party list, proportional representation basis, by province, for four-year terms. A 1949 constitutional amendment prevents deputies from serving for two successive terms, though a deputy may run for an Assembly seat again after sitting out a term. As of March 2019, a proposal to switch to mixed-member proportional representation based on the German system is under discussion.

== Parliamentary factions ==
The parliamentary factions in Costa Rica correspond to the representation of the political parties according to the electoral results obtained for each period:

In the Legislative Assembly there will be as many factions as political parties are represented in it. The deputies will be considered integrated to the Faction of the party for which they were elected and none may belong to more than one faction.

— Regulations of the Legislative Assembly, Chapter II, Disciplinary Regime, Article 7bis, Parliamentary Factions.

Accordingly, the Electoral Code assigns to the political parties the exclusive legitimacy to nominate candidates for deputies, as stipulated in article 74.

== Deputies ==
The deputies are elected by province. The Assembly is made up of fifty-seven deputies, all proprietors. Each time a general population census is carried out, the Supreme Electoral Court of Costa Rica reassigns the number of deputies allocated to each province, in proportion to the population of each one of them.

=== Requirements ===
Deputies are elected for four years in office and cannot be successively reelected. There are only three requirements to qualify for the position:

1. Be a citizen;
2. Be Costa Rican by birth, or by naturalization with ten years of residence in the country after having obtained nationality;
3. Be at least twenty one years old.

=== Impediments ===
Cannot be elected deputies, nor registered as candidates for that function:

1. The President of the Republic or whoever replaces him in the exercise of the Presidency at the time of the election;
2. The Government Ministers;
3. The proprietary Magistrates of the Supreme Court of Justice;
4. The proprietary and alternate Magistrates of the Supreme Electoral Tribunal, and the director of the Civil Registry;
5. The military on active duty;
6. Those who exercise jurisdiction, civil or police authority, extend to a province;
7. The managers of the autonomous institutions;
8. The relatives of the person who exercises the Presidency of the Republic, up to the second degree of consanguinity or affinity, inclusive.

These incompatibilities affect those who hold the indicated positions within the six months prior to the date of the election. For that reason, when an administration is about to end, it is usual that there are several resignations of the people who occupy these positions and try to aspire to a deputy seat.

Deputies cannot accept, after being sworn in, under penalty of losing their credentials, any position or employment in the other Powers of the State or autonomous institutions, except in the case of a Ministry of Government. In this case, they will rejoin the National Assembly when they cease to function. The legislative function is also incompatible with the exercise of any other public office of popular election. The deputies may not enter into, directly or indirectly, or by representation, any contract with the State, nor obtain a concession of public goods that implies privilege, nor intervene as directors, administrators or managers in companies that contract with the State, works, supplies or exploitation of public services.

=== Parliamentary immunity ===
The deputies are not responsible for the opinions that they issue in the Legislative Plenary. During the sessions, they cannot be arrested for civil reasons, unless authorized by the Legislative Assembly itself or if the deputy consents to it. From the time they are declared proprietor or alternate deputies, until they end their legal term, they may not be deprived of their liberty for criminal reasons, except when they have previously been suspended by the Legislative Assembly. This parliamentary immunity does not take effect in the case of flagrant crime, or when the deputy renounces it. However, the deputies who have been arrested in flagrante delicto, will be released if the Legislative Assembly orders it. It is similar to the so-called parliamentary privilege of the Westminster system of the Parliament of the United Kingdom.

=== Independent deputies ===
It is possible for a deputy elected by a political party, to separate from the parliamentary faction of that party and act as an independent deputy, however the deputies who avail themselves to this allowance cannot join another legislative faction, only the one for which they were elected, as contemplated in the Regulations of the Legislative Assembly. It is not possible, according to current legislation, for a citizen to directly run for the position of an independent deputy without the representation of a political party.

Becoming an independent deputy is protected by virtue of Article 25 of the Constitution of Costa Rica, which states that all citizens have freedom of association and thus cannot be forced to remain in a specific political party and can join any other political group.

The inhabitants of the Republic have the right to associate for lawful purposes. No one may be forced to be part of any association.

— Article 25 of the Constitution of Costa Rica

However, as the Supreme Electoral Court of Costa Rica has repeatedly observed, since deputies are popularly elected, their nomination must be made through a political party, due to the framework of the current legal system, in which the political parties have a monopoly on the nomination of candidates for deputies according to the Electoral Code.

Therefore, independent deputies cannot act on behalf of another party for which they were not elected within the legislative board, only independently, nor are they considered a faction, or a bloc, a word that does not exist within the Regulations of the Legislative Assembly. Other activities that belong to the legislative factions or faction leaders are not allowed either, such as including bills on the deliberations.

Several independent deputies through history have asked the Constitutional Chamber of the Supreme Court of Justice to be recognized as the head of a parliamentary faction or to have the financial resources of a faction, in contradiction with the regulations. The court has stated:

Indeed, it is not possible under any circumstances, to claim that any deputy who separates from the Faction to which he belongs, is declared as a new Political Faction, with all the attributions and duties inherent to this condition, both due to the existence of a regulatory provision that defines and restricts the concept of "Parliamentary Faction", as well as a basic aspect of common sense, which seeks to establish the necessary limits to achieve the ideal organizational mechanisms that allow, in turn, an effective and efficient development of the legislative tasks.

— Constitutional Chamber of the Supreme Court of Justice of Costa Rica, Resolution 2009000849, Results #2, Page 1.

The eventual subsequent separation of a deputy from the political party for which he was elected does not mean that the deputy loses his status as such, being that at all times he maintains the powers, rights and duties inherent to his position; But the foregoing does not imply that his separation empowers him to acquire, ex officio and full right, the competences that are typical of a figure expressly provided in the Regulations, with particular duties and rights and intended to be the representative of a group of deputies elected under the same political flag.

— Constitutional Chamber of the Supreme Court of Justice of Costa Rica, Resolution 2009000849, Results #2, Page 2.

Thus, there is no regulatory possibility of forming a faction not linked to the representation of a political party that has elected at least one representative by means of suffrage, understood in accordance with article 93 of the Constitution.

In the 2018–2022 legislative period several deputies elected through the National Restoration Party and the National Integration Party declared themselves independent and then gave their personal adhesion as a bloc or individually to parties that were not elected. This, in accordance with the regulations, constitutes a personal affiliation, and it does not imply in any way that the parties they later affiliated to have legal representation as a parliamentary faction, so they are recognized as independent within the directory of deputies of the Legislative Assembly.

=== Debate about the number and election of deputies ===
The Legislative Assembly is a unicameral body of 57 deputies whose number is constitutionally fixed and whose deputies are elected on closed lists nominated by the political parties according to a proportional system. Different experts have recommended the increase in the number of deputies as an urgent need to improve representation, but this proposal is highly unpopular among the population and generates rejection reactions.

A report by the United Nations Development Programme and the Center for Research and Political Studies of the University of Costa Rica recommended increasing the number of legislators to 82.

The Northwestern University, which made recommendations for more than 100 countries, recommended that the assembly have 115 deputies according to their population (in 1999),

The Board of Notables for State Reform (Spanish: Junta de Notables para la Reforma del Estado) called by President Laura Chinchilla during her administration recommended increasing the number of deputies to between 75 and 85. The Poder Ciudadano Ya movement on the other hand proposed to increase it to 84 and drastically reduce the number of legislative advisers (currently 12) to avoid a very large increase in salaries.

A proposal to use the German system for the election of deputies by lawyer Diego González suggests increasing the number to 143, making use of an electoral system in which the country would be divided into 72 electoral circuits of 59,700 inhabitants. Deputies would be elected on two lists, 72 elected by a single-member constituency where a deputy is directly elected for each district, and 71 elected by a proportional constituency where they would be distributed proportionally according to the votes received per party.

Most of these proposals also include the change to the direct election of deputies and not by closed lists as it is currently.

== Composition ==
The number of seats by province for the 2018–2022 period is:

Seat allocation
| Province | Number of seats | Population (as of 2023 census) |
|---|---|---|
| (San José Province) San José | 19 | 1,404,242 |
| Alajuela | 11 | 848,146 |
| (Cartago Province) Cartago | 7 | 490,903 |
| Heredia | 6 | 433,677 |
| Guanacaste | 4 | 326,953 |
| Puntarenas | 5 | 410,929 |
| Limón | 5 | 386,862 |

== Directorate ==
Following the 2022 legislative election, the President of the Legislative Assembly was elected in the person of former presidency minister Rodrigo Arias Sánchez of the National Liberation Party with the support of all deputies except those of the Broad Front.

== Parliamentary factions in Legislative Assembly, 2026–2030 ==
Parliamentary factions 2026-2030
| Name (English) | Name (Spanish) | Abbrev. | Seats | Percentage of Assembly | Party flag |
|---|---|---|---|---|---|
| Sovereign People's Party | Partido Pueblo Soberano | PPSO | 31 | 54.39% | |
| National Liberation Party | Partido Liberación Nacional | PLN | 17 | 29.82% | |
| Broad Front | Frente Amplio | FA | 7 | 12.28% | |
| Social Christian Unity Party | Partido Unidad Social Cristiana | PUSC | 1 | 1.75% | |
| Citizens' Action Party | Coalición Agenda Ciudadana | CAC | 1 | 1.75% | |

== Premises ==
Legislative Assembly Building

In October 2020 the new Asamblea Legislativa building was inaugurated for sessions of the legislative body. Its construction started on 7 March 2018, and has eighteen floors. It is located in the Carmen district of San José.

The Assembly used to meet in the Central Building (Edificio Central) located immediately east of the current building. Work began on that building in 1937, with the plan of having it serve as the new presidential palace. However, since much of the building materials were imported from Germany and Czechoslovakia, the onset of the Second World War put a halt to the project. Work did not restart until 1957, but by 1958 the legislature was installed and operating in its new premises.

== History ==
The foundations of the Legislative Assembly date back to the establishment of various courts and congresses in New Spain. The modern assembly was created in the aftermath of the Costa Rican Civil War that deposed Teodoro Picado Michalski in 1948. José Figueres Ferrer headed a ruling junta that oversaw the election of a Constituent Assembly. Between 1948 and 1949, this Constituent Assembly created the Constitution of Costa Rica which lays forth the rules governing the assembly today.

During each four-year legislative session, various political parties have occupied majority, minority, and coalition caucuses in the assembly.

== Central American Parliament ==
Costa Rica is the only Spanish-speaking Central American country not to send deputies to the supranational Central American Parliament.

== See also ==
- List of presidents of the Legislative Assembly of Costa Rica
- Politics of Costa Rica
- List of legislatures by country

== Notes ==
Normative based on the Constitution of 1871, basis of the current Constitution of Costa Rica since 1949, in which article 12 states that the army is permanently abolished.
