= Timeline of LGBTQ history in Panama =

This article is a timeline of notable events related to the lesbian, gay, bisexual, transgender, and queer (LGBTQ) community in Panama.

== Before the 20th century ==
=== 1513 ===
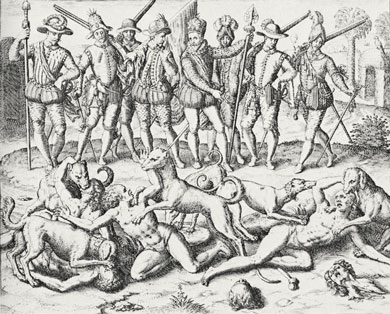
Indigenous people accused of sodomy being murdered by dogs, on the orders of Vasco Núñez de Balboa.

- September 24: Spanish conquistador Vasco Núñez de Balboa executes around 40 indigenous people accused of having sexual relationships with people of the same sex in the Carecuá comarca, in the region corresponding to present-day Panama. The accused people were thrown to a group of war dogs that mauled them to death.

== 20th century ==
=== 1949 ===
- May 20: Executive Decree N. 149 is issued, which criminalizes homosexuality (named in Article 12 of the decree with the term "sodomy") with a prison term of three months to one year.

=== 1957 ===
- Writer Tristán Solarte publishes the novel El ahogado, which features one of the most notable LGBTQ characters in Panamanian literature.

=== 1972 ===
- Writer Agustín Del Rosario wins the Ricardo Miró National Literature Award with his homoerotic poetry book De parte interesada.

=== 1984 ===
- The first HIV cases in Panama are identified.

=== 1996 ===
- Writer Javier Stanziola wins the Ricardo Miró National Literature Award with his LGBTQ theater play De mangos y albaricoques.
- June 29: The Asociación Hombres y Mujeres Nuevos de Panamá is created, which is considered the first LGBTQ organization in the history of the country, although they lacked official government recognition during their first few years.

=== 1998 ===
- For the first time in history, LGBTQ people get authorization to participate in the official parade of the Panama Carnival. Conservative groups criticized this decision.

== 21st century ==
=== 2001 ===
- September 4: The Asociación de Hombres y Mujeres Nuevos de Panamá gains official government recognition from the Panamanian State.

=== 2004 ===
- The first edition of the Panama Pride Parade takes place.

=== 2008 ===
- May: Enrique Jelenszky and John Winstanley, citizens of Panama and the United Kingdom, respectively, register their civil union at the British embassy in Panama.
- July 29: President Martín Torrijos Espino issues Executive Decree N. 332, which decriminalizes homosexuality in Panama. The decree goes into effect on July 31.

=== 2010 ===
- Actor Agustín Clément becomes the first Panamanian public figure to register his union with a person of the same sex, after registering his civil union (PACS) with his boyfriend, French citizen Cesar Pereira, in the French consulate of Panama.

=== 2011 ===
- May 29: An LGBTQ kiss-in takes place in front of the Metropolitan Cathedral of Panama City as a response to the detention by the police of two lesbian women who kissed at the same place a few weeks earlier.

=== 2013 ===
- The short film Los agustines is released, which is considered the first openly LGBTQ Panamanian film.

=== 2016 ===
- May 6: Activist Candy Pamela González becomes the first Panamanian transgender woman to obtain authorization to legally change her name to one that reflects her gender identity.

=== 2017 ===
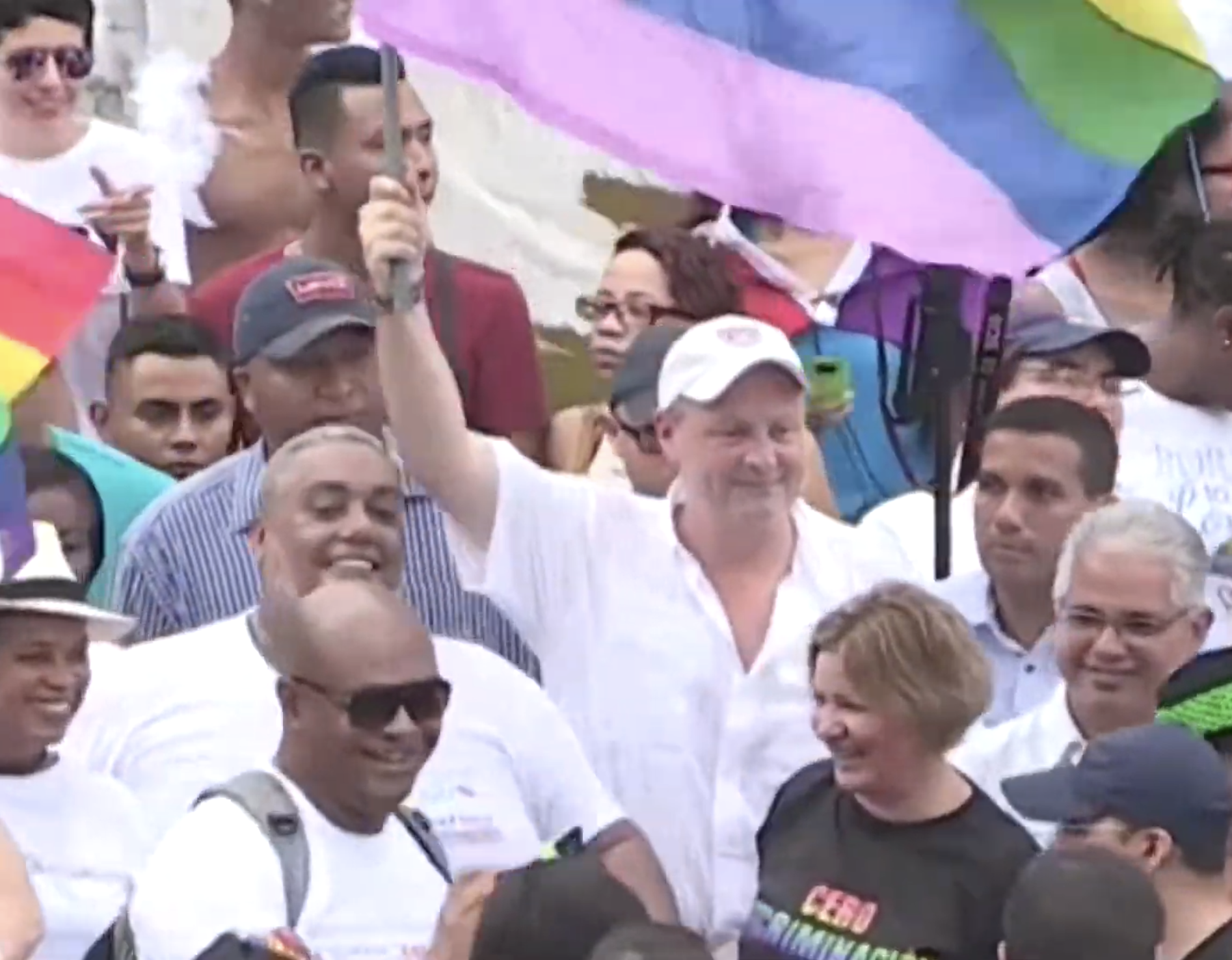
First lady of Panama, Lorena Castillo, during the 2017 Panama Pride.

- July 1: The Panama Pride Parade was attended for the first time by the country's first lady, namely Lorena Castillo, who served as the parade's grand marshal.

=== 2019 ===
- October 28: The National Assembly of Panama approves in a first vote a constitutional amendment to ban same-sex marriage (which was already banned in a statutory law). However, this vote led to civilian protests and president Laurentino Cortizo called on the Assembly to backtrack the amendment, which was eventually done.

=== 2020 ===
- April 1: The Panamanian government establishes separate days for men and women to circulate as a preventive measure against COVID-19. This led to numerous instances of discrimination against trans people, who began to be detained and fined regardless of the day they went out.

=== 2021 ===
- The beauty pageant Señorita Panamá, which was the local contest to choose the country's representative to Miss Universe, begins accepting transgender women as contestants.

=== 2023 ===
- March 1: The Supreme Court of Justice of Panama issues a ruling in which it declares that the same-sex marriage ban present in the country's statutory laws was not unconstitutional.
- March 24: The Inter-American Commission on Human Rights makes a call to Panama to guarantee the right of same-sex couples based on the OC-24/17 Advisory Opinion and regretted the Supreme Court's ruling against same-sex marriage earlier that month.
- June 29: The first mass symbolic same-sex wedding ceremony was scheduled to take place in the country. The ceremony, organized by the lesbian pastor Maricarmen Gutiérrez, was ultimately suspended by the Panama Pride organizers after receiving threats from extremist groups.

=== 2025 ===
- November: During Panama’s Universal Periodic Review, 20 countries recommend that it should add explicit protections against discrimination based on sexual orientation and gender identity to its laws, as well as guarantee the legal recognition of gender self-identification.

== See also ==
- LGBTQ history in Panama
- LGBTQ rights in Panama
- Recognition of same-sex unions in Panama
