= Timeline of LGBTQ history in Costa Rica =

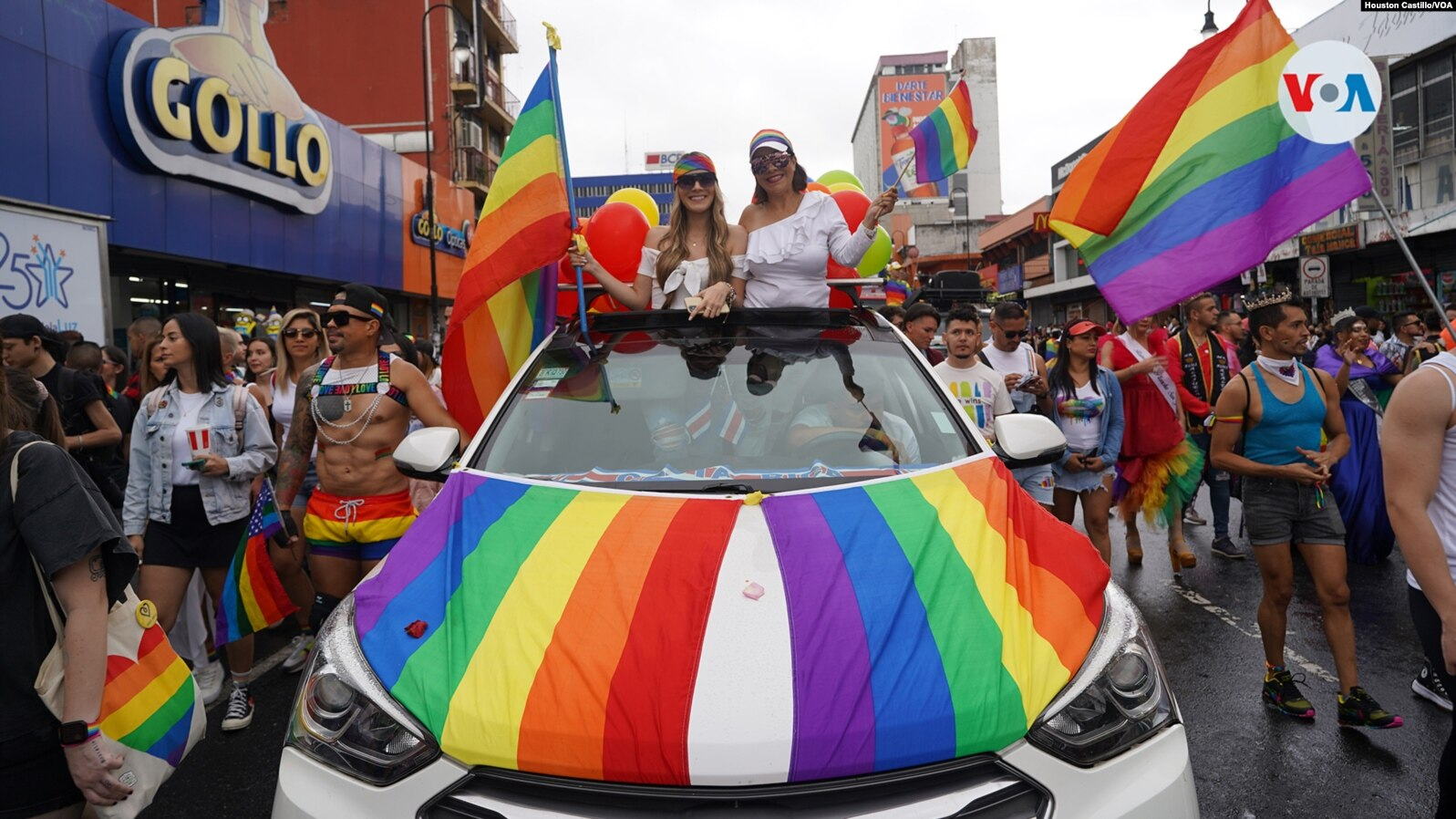
LGBTQ activists during the San José Pride Parade in 2022.

This is a timeline of notable events in the history of LGBTQ people in Costa Rica. The history of lesbian, gay, bisexual, transgender and queer (LGBT) people in Costa Rica has been marked by periods of persecution, during which they suffered abuse, discrimination, and police detentions, and a subsequent evolution towards the social acceptance that characterizes the country today. During the first half of the 20th century, gay men were arrested on charges of "sodomy" and they usually came from poor neighborhoods. These arrests were based on Costa Rican laws that criminalized same-sex sexual relations, such as Article 233 of the 1941 Penal Code, which imposed a penalty of one to three years for the crime of "sodomy". In the medical field, attitudes toward homosexuality were influenced by religious and moral beliefs, and it was therefore seen as a "problem" that needed to be addressed by the justice or the education systems.

Homosexuality was decriminalized in the country in 1971, but the law continued to criminalize activities such as "scandalous sodomy" until 2002. The 1970s also marked the public appearance of the first Costa Rican lesbian groups, which in the country emerged before gay men's groups. The arrival of HIV intensified the persecution of sexual minorities by the police, who began a widespread crusade of "social cleansing". By 1987, police raids routinely resulted in the arrest of hundreds of gay people. This led to the publication of the Letter of April 5th, a letter that appeared that year in newspaper La Nación in which more than one hundred prominent figures spoke out against police abuses, and which became an important catalyst for the national LGBTQ movement.

In recent decades, Costa Rica has seen significant progress in protecting the rights of queer people, making it a popular destination for migrants from other Central American countries. Social openness and legal changes accelerated in 2014 with the start of the presidency of Luis Guillermo Solís, whose government pledged to work toward several advancements in this area. In 2016, Vice President Ana Helena Chacón submitted a request to the Inter-American Court of Human Rights (IACHR) regarding various issues related to sexual diversity. The court responded in its Advisory Opinion 24/17 in favor of LGBTQ rights, and Costa Rican authorities accepted the ruling. As a result, the government approved in 2018 the recognition of names according to the gender identity of transgender people, and in 2020, same-sex marriage was legalized, making Costa Rica the first Central American country to grant this right.

== 20th century ==
=== 1910 ===
- One of the earliest mentions of queer people in Costa Rican media appears in the newspaper La Información. The case involved Pedro Enaguas, who, from the age of 12, wore women's clothing and adopted behaviors that were commonly associated with women at the time. Because of this, as well as activities such as sewing and embroidery, the local community considered Pedro to be a woman.

=== 1916 ===
- Writer Jenaro Cardona publishes La esfinge del sendero, which is considered the first Costa Rican literary work to include a representation of homosexuality.

=== 1941 ===
- Costa Rica's 1941 Penal Code is enacted. Article 233 imposes a prison sentence of one to three years for homosexuality, referred to in the legal text as "sodomy". The article stated:

Anyone found guilty of the crime of sodomy, shall suffer imprisonment from one to three years; and if one of the accused has authority or disciplinary power over the other, such as a parent, guardian, teacher, employer, caretaker, or in any other position involving authority or moral guidance, the penalty shall be two to four years.

=== 1970 ===
- May 4: Costa Rica's 1970 Penal Code is approved. It removes sodomy as a criminal offense, thereby decriminalizing homosexuality in Costa Rica. However, the code retains the crime of "scandalous sodomy" and includes discriminatory references to homosexuality, which are not removed until 2002 and 2013, respectively. The law comes into force on November 15, 1971.

=== 1978 ===
- The Movement for Homosexual Liberation is founded, which is considered Costa Rica's first LGBTQ activist organization. It emerges from members of the Socialist Workers' Organization Party.

=== 1979 ===
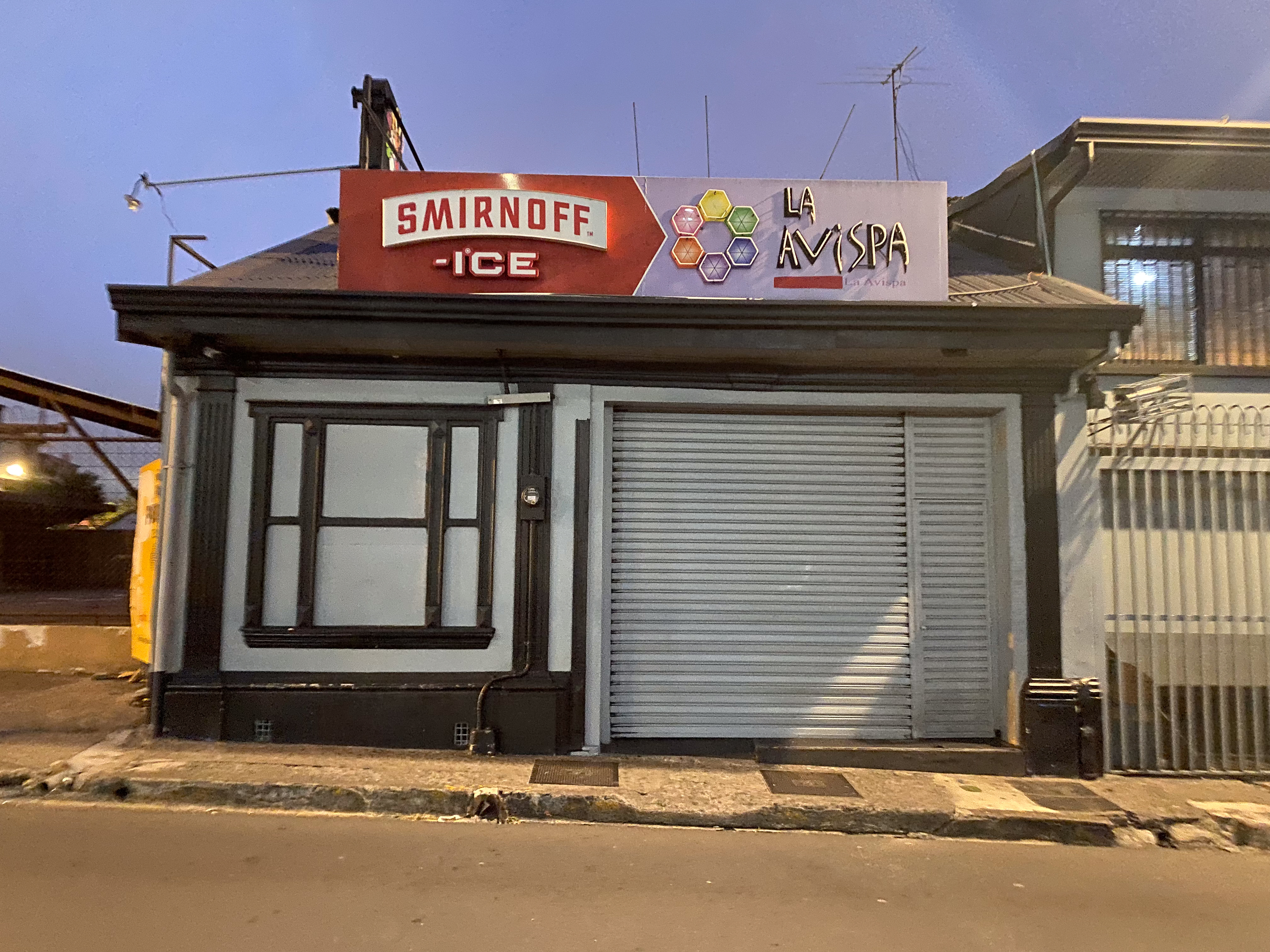
Nightclub La avispa in 2023.

- May: LGBTQ nightclub La avispa opens in the El Alto neighborhood of Guadalupe. It becomes one of the most iconic LGBTQ spaces in 20th-century Costa Rica.

=== 1983 ===
- The first HIV cases in Costa Rica are identified.

=== 1985 ===
- Using the HIV epidemic as a justification, national authorities intensify the persecution of queer people through police raids.

=== 1987 ===
- March 14: Massive police raids throughout San José result in the detention of 253 homosexual people.
- April 5: Political scientist Jacobo Schifter publishes the so-called Letter of April 5th in newspaper La Nación, in which he condemmed state violence and police raids against sexual minorities. The letter is signed by 153 Costa Rican public figures, mainly from academia.

=== 1990 ===
- April 11: The second Latin American and Caribbean Lesbian-Feminist Gathering begins in Costa Rica, organized by the local lesbian group Las Entendidas. After authorities learn of the event, a widespread moral panic erupts. Although no participants are harmed, the controversy eventually leads to the dissolution of Las Entendidas.

=== 1991 ===
- The pioneering organization GAYPOA-Abraxas is founded in San Pedro de Poás by activist Francisco Madrigal to defend the human rights of gay and lesbian people. It later becomes known as the Asociación Triángulo Rosa (Pink Triangle Association).

=== 1993 ===
- A violent police raid against LGBTQ people takes place at the Déjà Vu bar. The incident is extensively documented and leads to a court case that is ultimately decided in favor of the victims.

=== 1995 ===
- Asociación Triángulo Rosa becomes the first Costa Rican LGBTQ organization to obtain legal status.

=== 1998 ===
- Asociación Triángulo Rosa organizes the first Central American Gay and Lesbian Conference.
- A planned event called the Lesbi-Gay Festival in Quepos and Manuel Antonio is canceled to protect attendees after negative statements from President Miguel Ángel Rodríguez Echeverría and Archbishop Román Arrieta.
- May 20: The General HIV/AIDS Bill is approved, which included protections against discrimination based on a person's "sexual option".

== 21st century ==
=== 2000 ===
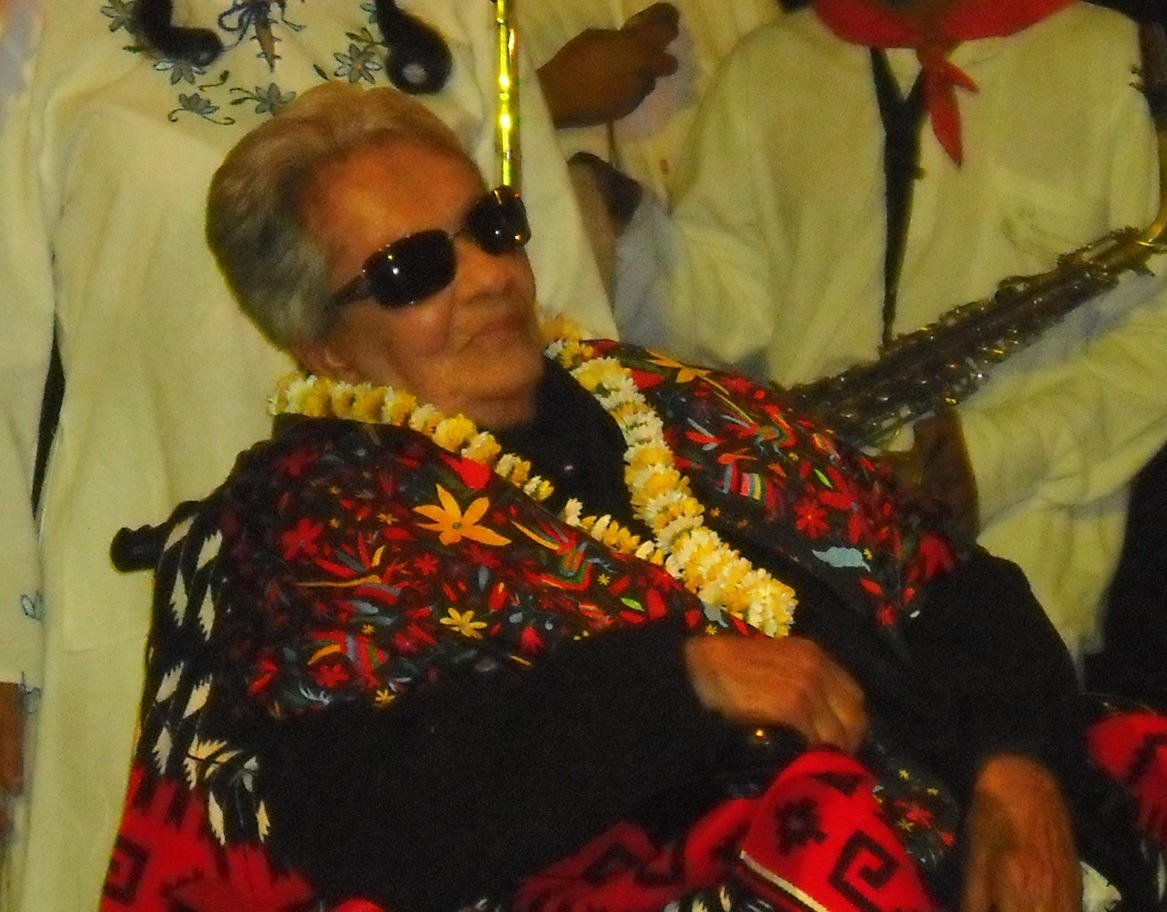
Chavela Vargas in 2008.

- Journalist Marcelo Castro and singer Chavela Vargas publicly come out as gay, becoming among the first openly LGBTQ public figures from the country.

=== 2002 ===
- Article 378 of the Penal Code, which criminalized "scandalous sodomy", is repealed.

=== 2003 ===
- The country's first Diversity Festival is held, which was one of the main precursors to the San José Pride.

=== 2005 ===
- The organization Movimiento Diversidad (Diversity Movement) is founded and in the coming years it becomes a leading force in the fight for LGBTQ rights.

=== 2006 ===
- May 23: The Constitutional Chamber of the Supreme Court of Justice of Costa Rica dismisses an constitutional challenge filled by lawyer Yashín Castrillo against article 14 of the Family Code, which prohibited marriage for same-sex couples.
- September 27: Legislators Ana Helena Chacón, José Merino del Río, and Carlos Gutiérrez Gómez introduce a bill to legalize civil unions for same-sex couples Although eventually shelved, it sparks significant public debate and opposition from conservative groups.

=== 2007 ===
- President Óscar Arias Sánchez and Health Minister María Luisa Ávila sign an executive decree lifting the ban on blood donations by gay people.

=== 2008 ===
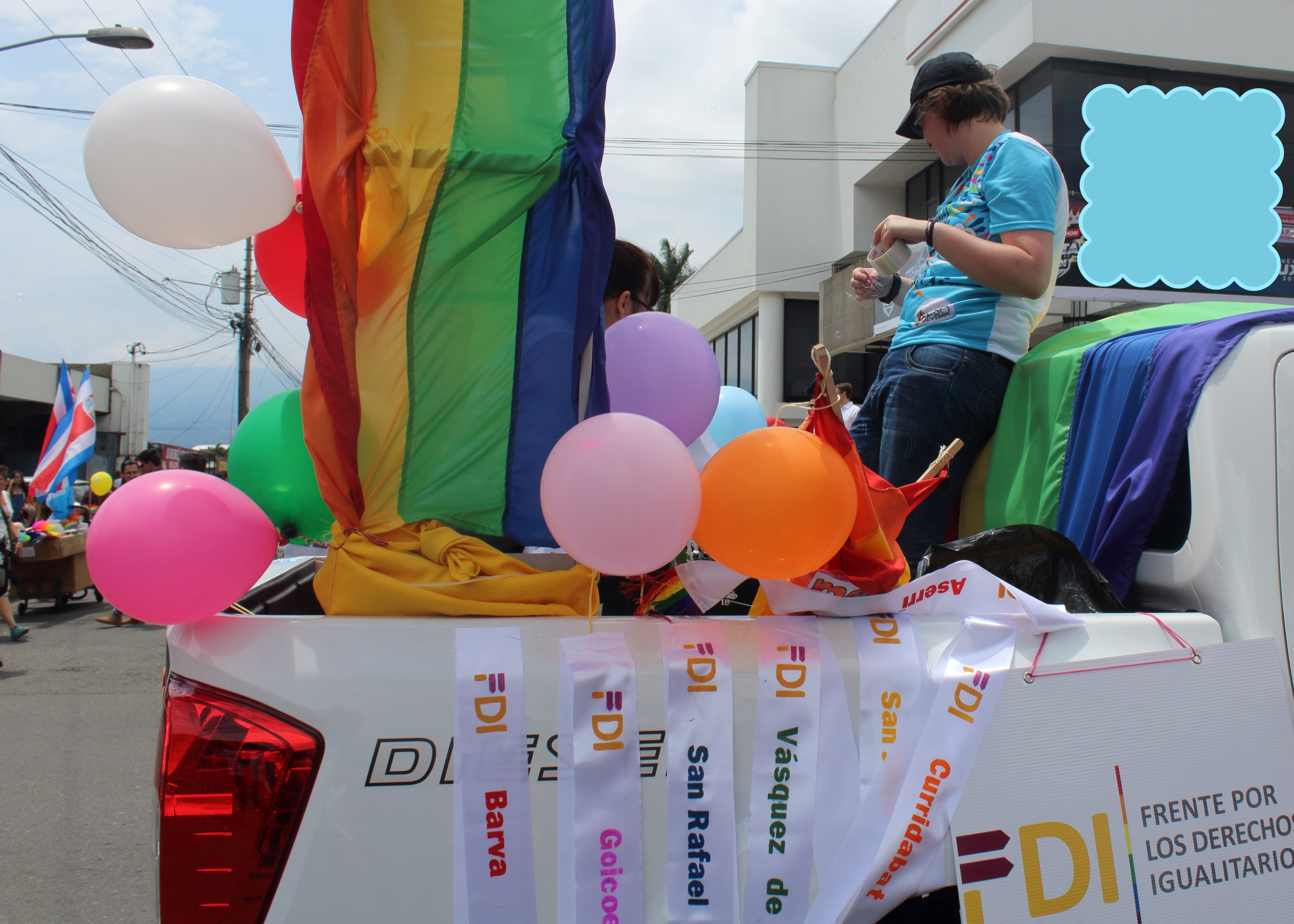
LGBTQ activists during the 2016 San José Pride parade.

- The first San José Pride Parade takes place.
- March 25: Executive Decree No. 34399 establishes May 17 as the National Day Against Homophobia, to commemorate the date on which the World Health Organization removed homosexuality from its list of diseases (May 17, 1990). The date is later renamed the National Day Against Homophobia, Lesbophobia, and Transphobia.

=== 2009 ===
- The Constitutional Chamber of the Supreme Court of Justice of Costa Rica dismisses a constitutional challenge filed by lawyer Yashín Castrillo against Article 242 of the Family Code, which prohibited civil unions for same-sex couples.
- Transvida is founded, an organization dedicated to improving the lives of Costa Rica's transgender population, particularly transgender women.

=== 2010 ===
- June 17: The Civil Registry approves Decree N.º 08-201, which allows transgender people to use identity document photographs that reflect their gender identity.
- June 22: Directive DEL1358-2010 is published, which allows transgender people to include their chosen name under the field "known as" on identity documents.
- August 10: The Constitutional Chamber of the Supreme Court of Justice of Costa Rica issues a ruling prohibiting a referendum on the legalization of civil unions for same-sex couples, after opponents of the bill, which was originally introduced in 2006, collected 150,000 signatures to force a vote. In its decision, the Court stated that the rights of a minority could not be decided by a majority, as that could ultimately exacerbate discrimination against disadvantaged groups.

=== 2012 ===
- June 12: The March of the Invisible takes place, a massive demonstration against homophobia and in favor of secularity.

=== 2013 ===
- Congresswoman Carmen Muñoz Quesada publicly announces her homosexuality in an interview with newspaper La Nación. She thus becomes the first openly lesbian legislator in the country's history.
- July 1: The Legislative Assembly of Costa Rica approves an amendment to the General Law for Young People. Among the changes was a clause asserting that young people had the right to access civil unions "without discrimination contrary to human dignity", which would later open the door for queer people to access this right.
- July 31: The Constitutional Chamber of the Supreme Court of Justice of Costa Rica issues a ruling annulling section 6 of article 98 and section e of article 102 of the Penal Code, which referred to security measures for homosexual detainees, thus eliminating the last discriminatory references to homosexuality from Costa Rican criminal law.

=== 2014 ===
- May 8: Wilhelm von Breymann becomes the first openly gay cabinet minister in Costa Rican history, after being appointed Minister of Tourism by President Luis Guillermo Solís.
- October 9: The Costa Rican Social Security Fund approves a reform allowing same-sex couples to access the health insurance of their insured partners, making Costa Rica the first country in Central America to allow this.

=== 2015 ===
- May 12: President Luis Guillermo Solís publishes Executive Decree No. 38999 in the official gazette, establishing policies to eradicate discrimination against LGBTQ people in public institutions.
- June 1: The Goicoechea Family Court rules in favor of Gerald Castro and Christian Zamora's request for a civil union, making them the first same-sex couple in the country to obtain one. The ruling was based on legal changes made in 2013 to the General Law for Young People.

=== 2016 ===
- May 18: Vice President Ana Helena Chacón submits a query to the Inter-American Court of Human Rights, asking, among other things, whether the American Convention on Human Rights required the legalization of legal institutions (such as civil unions and marriage) to register same-sex couples.

=== 2017 ===
- November 24: The Inter-American Court of Human Rights (IACHR) issues Advisory Opinion 24/17, in which it orders member states of the Inter-American Human Rights System to grant same-sex couples the same legal recognition as different-sex couples, including civil unions and marriage. The opinion was released on January 8 of the following year and arose from a request made in 2016 by the Vice President of Costa Rica, Ana Helena Chacón.

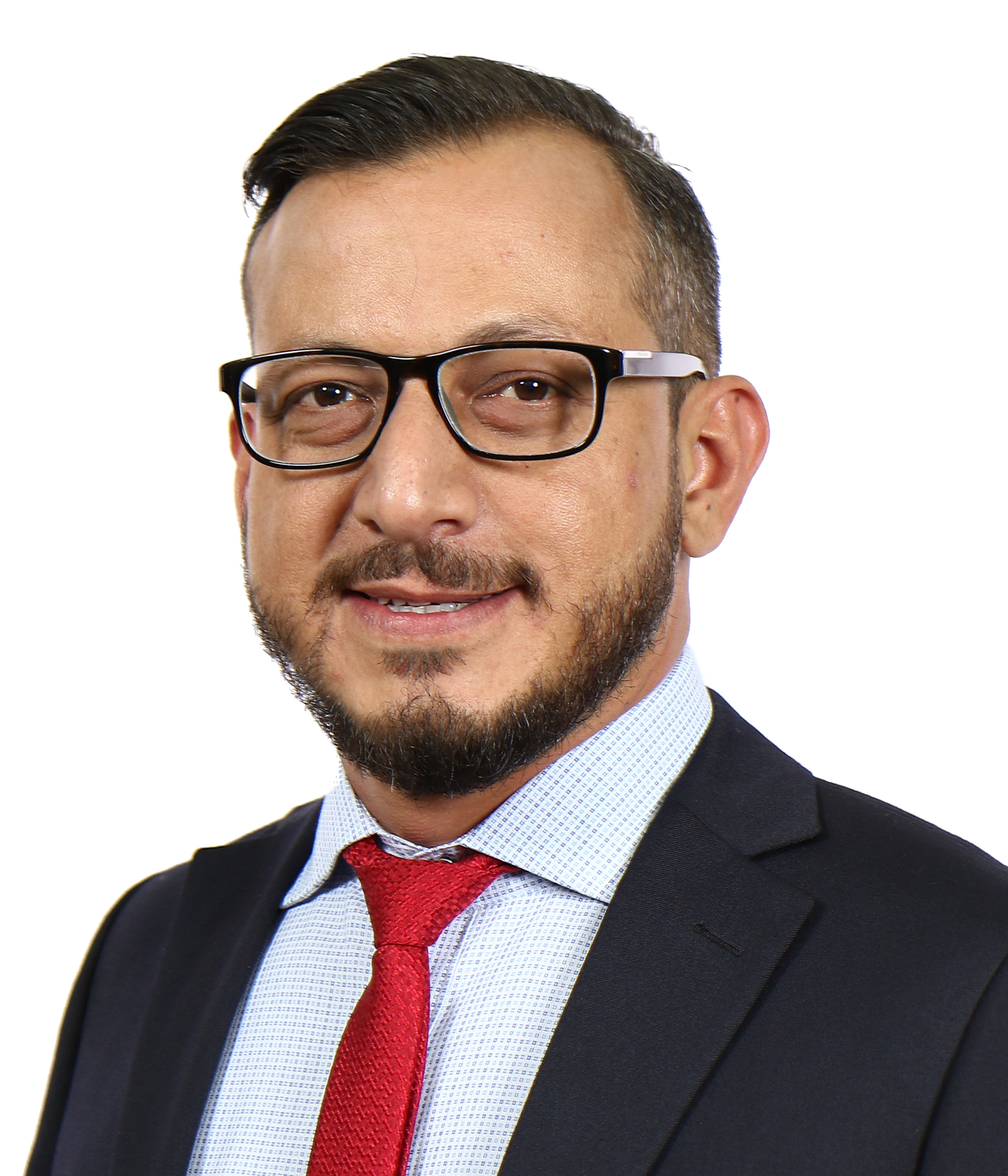
Enrique Sánchez, first openly gay legislator in Costa Rica.

- May 1: Enrique Sánchez becomes the first openly gay legislator in the country's history.
- May 14: The Supreme Electoral Tribunal approves Agreement No. 49-2018, in which it establishes a legal name change mechanism for transgender people based on their gender identity, as well as the removal of the sex field from their identity documents.
- August 8: The Constitutional Chamber of the Supreme Court of Justice of Costa Rica adopts the Inter-American Court of Human Rights' Advisory Opinion 24/17 in favor of marriage equality, granting the Legislative Assembly 18 months to legalize same-sex marriage. If the Assembly does not make the change, the Court rules that same-sex marriage will be automatically legalized at the end of the period.
- December 21: President Carlos Alvarado Quesada issues four decrees in favor of the LGBTQ population. The decrees address the recognition of gender identity for transgender foreigners, immigration status for binational same-sex couples, the inclusion of biphobia in the National Day Against Discrimination, and the declaration of an hormonal protocol for transgender people as being of public interest.
- Dayana Hernández, member of the VAMOS political party, becomes the first transgender woman to run for a seat in the Legislative Assembly in the general elections that year.

=== 2019 ===
- June 18: The General Directorate of Migration and Foreigners grants residency status for the first time to a foreigner based on their marriage to a Costa Rican citizen of the same sex.

=== 2020 ===
- May 26: The 18-month deadline set by the Constitutional Chamber in 2018 for the Legislative Assembly to implement Advisory Opinion 24/17 expires, thus legalizing same-sex marriage in Costa Rica. On the same day, the first same-sex marriage in the country takes place, between Daritza Araya and Alexandra Quirós.

=== 2023 ===
- March 2: The feature film En algún sitio, directed by Frayser Navarrette, premieres. It is the first Costa Rican film focused on an same-sex romance.

=== 2025 ===
- January 29: The Constitutional Chamber of the Supreme Court of Justice of Costa Rica issues a ruling recognizing the right to access co-maternity leave or permits for non-gestational mothers in same-sex parent households.

== Bibliografía ==
- Arévalo, Amaral; Rocha, David; Jiménez Bolaños, José Daniel (2022). "Las llagas abiertas del tabú: alteridades sexuales en Centroamérica". Historia, actualidad y cuestionamientos sobre la región centroamericana en su Bicentenario. Volumen I (PDF). Sao Paulo: Ediciones Each. Archived from the original (PDF) on 2023-12-08.
- Pérez, Natalia (2019). "Uniones de hecho de las personas LGBTI a la luz de la Ley General de la Persona Joven, sus efectos patrimoniales, familiares, sociales y su similitud con la figura del matrimonio" (PDF). Universidad de Costa Rica. Archived from the original (PDF) on 2023-12-30.
- Solano, Daniela (2023). "Historia del movimiento LGBTI en Costa Rica" (PDF). Oficina del Alto Comisionado de las Naciones Unidas para los Derechos Humanos. Archived from the original (PDF) on 2023-12-30.
