= San José Pride =

Annual LGBTQ event in San José, Costa Rica

San José Diversity March
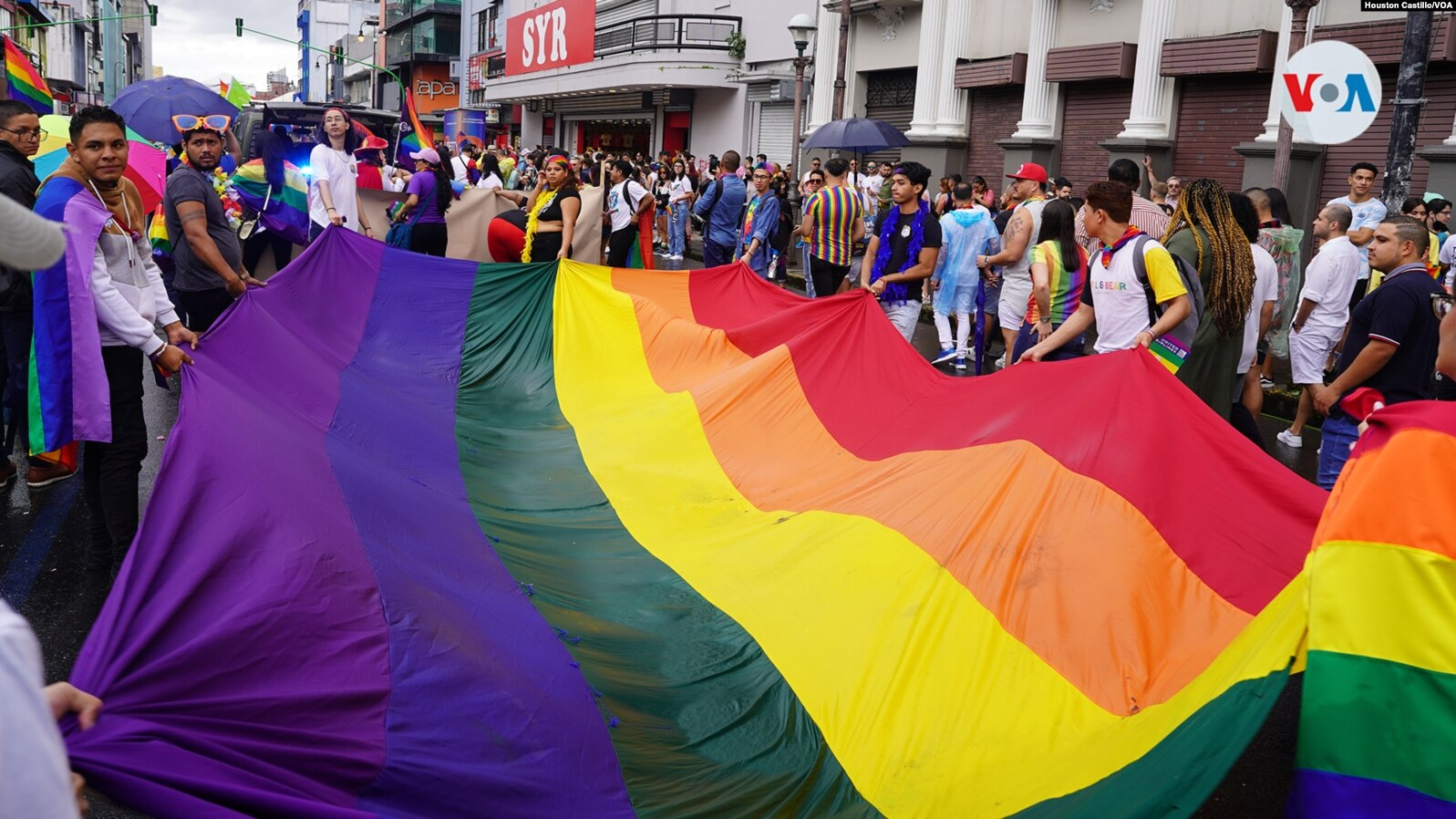
- Genre: pride parade
- Date: June
- Frequency: annually
- Location: San José
- Country: Costa Rica
- Years active: 2008–present
- Inaugurated: 2008

The San José Diversity March, better known as San José Pride, is a demonstration of LGBT Pride that is held annually in the city of San José, capital of Costa Rica, to claim equal rights for LGBT people. The event brings together more than 100,000 people every year, making it one of the largest public demonstrations in the country.

In addition to individuals, the march attracts delegations from public and private entities, including companies, embassies and universities. It has also had the presence of politicians such as Carmen Muñoz Quesada, Ofelia Taitelbaum and José María Villalta, as well as international artists, such as the Mexican singer Paulina Rubio, who performed the closing concert in 2022.

Over the years, the march has changed its route. In its first event in 2008, the route spanned from the Central Park to the Plaza de la Democracia. In 2010, the starting location changed to La Sabana Metropolitan Park and the route passed through Paseo Colón to reach the Central Park, occasionally extending to the Plaza de la Democracia. In 2022, the route changed to the opposite direction, spanning from Central Park to La Sabana Metropolitan Park.

== History ==
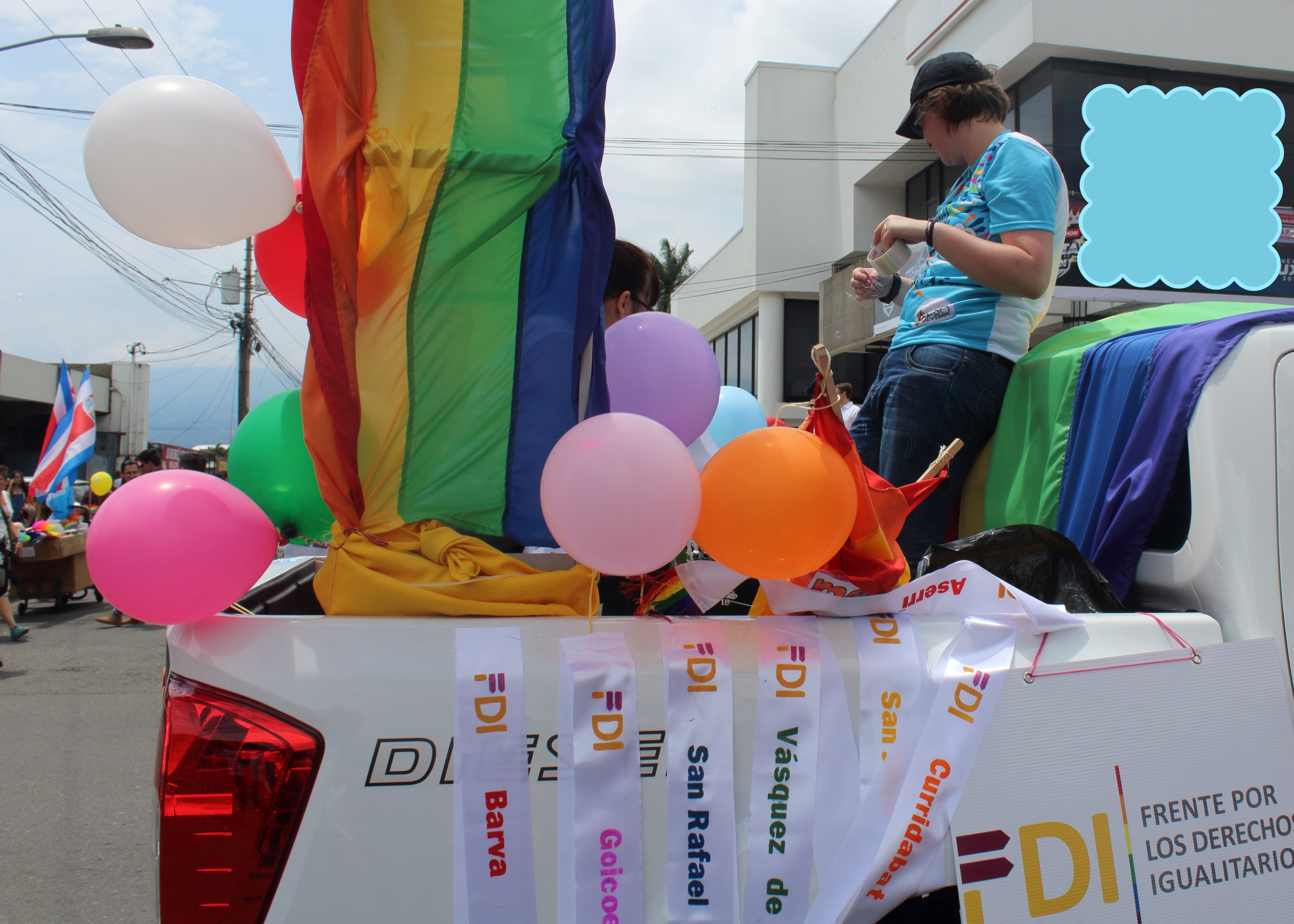
LGBTQ activists during the 2016 edition of the San José Pride.

=== Background ===
One of the oldest records of a Gay Pride celebration in Costa Rica took place on June 26, 2000, although it was a private party. In 2002, there was an attempt to organize a pride march, but it never came to fruition due to fear of the repercussions that the attendees could have.

The main precursor of the San José Diversity March was the Diversity Festival, organized in 2003 by the Center for Research and Promotion for Central America of Human Rights and other allied organizations. The first event, whose main message was against discrimination, was held on June 29, 2003 in the Plaza de la Democracia and featured presentations of poetry, music and theater.

=== Diversity March ===
The first Diversity March itself took place in 2008 and was organized by the Beso Diverso group. It was attended by about 70 people and followed the Second Avenue from Central Park to the Plaza de la Democracia. Because it coincided with a soccer match between Liga Deportiva Alajuelense and Deportivo Saprissa, the police initially asked the organizers to cancel the event for fear that sports fans could generate violence. However, the organizers decided to keep the march that day and it took place without complications.

The 2009 march was organized by activist Javier Umaña, although instead of a traditional parade it was a caravan of cars. In 2010, the event again consisted of a march and adopted its current characteristics. That year, the march was organized after police authorities banned a drag queen from taking photos at an artistic event in the city, so her supporters organized the march as a form of support. The event was held on June 27 and was attended by dozens of people who toured Paseo Colón.

Marching attendance increased considerably in a few years. In 2012 it was estimated that about 3,000 people attended, and by 2016 the figure increased to 40,000. In 2018, the march exceeded 100,000 participants, a figure that has been repeated in subsequent editions.

On the same day that the 2018 march took place, the then president of the republic, Carlos Alvarado Quesada, sent an article to several media in which he publicly apologized to the LGBT community for the past role of the Costa Rican State in the denial of their rights. In the following year's edition, President Alvarado personally attended the march along with a government delegation, which was also composed of the first lady, Claudia Dobles Camargo, the vice president, Epsy Campbell, and several ministers of state.

Due to the COVID-19 pandemic, the event was canceled in 2020 and 2021.

The 2024 march paid tribute to activist Dayana Hernández, who was ill in hospital. She died the following day.

== See also ==
- LGBTQ rights in Costa Rica
- Nicaragua Pride
- Panama Pride
