= Same-sex marriage in Costa Rica =

LGBTQ map of Costa Rica

Same-sex marriage has been legal in Costa Rica since May 26, 2020 as a result of a ruling by the Supreme Court of Justice. Costa Rica was the first country in Central America to recognize and perform same-sex marriages, the third in North America after Canada and the United States, and the 28th to do so worldwide.

On August 8, 2018, the Supreme Court of Justice of Costa Rica declared the sections of the Family Code prohibiting same-sex marriage to be unconstitutional, and gave the Legislative Assembly 18 months to reform the law accordingly; otherwise the ban would be abolished automatically. The ruling was published in the judicial bulletin on November 26, 2018, meaning that same-sex marriage would become legal no later than May 26, 2020. This followed an advisory opinion issued in January 2018 by the Inter-American Court of Human Rights stating that signatories of the American Convention on Human Rights are required to allow same-sex marriage.

The issue was a major topic during the 2018 Costa Rican general election. After the court ruling, several unsuccessful attempts by conservative lawmakers to delay the deadline failed due to lack of support.

== Civil unions ==
The legal recognition of same-sex unions in Costa Rica had been debated periodically from 2006, with debate resurfacing in May 2009 and causing significant controversy due to the strong influence of the Catholic Church in the nation. In August 2008, a group opposed to same-sex unions asked the Costa Rican electoral authority, the Tribunal Supremo de Elecciones (TSE), to hold a referendum on the subject, an action opposed by most organizations supporting same-sex civil unions in the country. On November 5, 2008, the TSE authorized the group to start collecting the signatures required by law to trigger the referendum (5% of registered voters). By July 2010, the required signatures had been collected and the TSE started the process to hold the referendum on December 5, 2010. In the meantime, several organizations and individuals, including the Ombudsman Office of Costa Rica, asked the Supreme Court to consider the legality of the proposed referendum. On August 10, 2010, the Constitutional Chamber of the Supreme Court (Sala IV) declared such a referendum unconstitutional. The court concluded that same-sex couples constituted a disadvantaged minority group subject to discrimination, and that allowing a referendum regarding their rights could potentially enable the non-LGBT majority to limit the rights of same-sex couples and thereby increase discrimination.

On July 2, 2013, the Legislative Assembly unanimously passed a measure that could legalize same-sex civil unions as part of a larger bill amending the General Young Person's Act (Spanish: Ley General de la Persona Joven). The passing of the bill was widely acknowledged to be a mistake by legislators unaware of its implications; those voting for the bill included legislators vocally opposed to LGBT rights. The mistake, however, did not impact the legality of the bill. The bill changed article 4(m) of the Act to recognize: "The right to recognition, without discrimination contrary to human dignity, of the social and economic effects of domestic partnerships which constitute in a public, notorious, unique and stable manner, with legal capacity for marriage for more than three years." The bill also changed the Family Code to allow couples living together for three years or more to be recognized as having a common-law marriage, which would grant them some legal benefits such as alimony. The final approved version of the bill did not give marriage a definition limited by gender. On July 4, 2013, President Laura Chinchilla signed the bill into law. A statement from the Minister of Communication said that it was not up to her to veto the bill and that the responsibility for interpreting it lay with legislators and judges. In July 2013, a same-sex couple asked the Supreme Court for their union to be recognized under the new law. LGBT rights activists reacting to the law said it needed to survive a constitutional challenge in court. Some constitutional lawyers stated that same-sex couples would "still lack legal capacity" to formalize their unions despite the passage of the law.

On December 3, 2014, Vice President Ana Helena Chacón confirmed that four same-sex union proposals would be debated starting in January 2015. President Luis Guillermo Solís said on November 27 that he supported a coexistence initiative to grant couples economic rights, but none of the civil union proposals equivalent to marriage. In mid-March 2015, the Solís Government promised to prioritize two bills on the matter. On August 12, 2015, it sent a partnership proposal to the extraordinary sessions of the Legislative Assembly, seeking to make the definition of cohabitation in article 242 of the Family Code gender-neutral.

In June 2015, a Costa Rican judge granted common-law marriage status to a same-sex couple, Gerald Castro and Cristian Zamora, basing his ruling on the July 2013 legislation. Conservative groups subsequently filed a lawsuit accusing the judge of breach of duty. A criminal court cleared the judge in April 2018.

Six deputies from the Social Christian Unity Party (PUSC) introduced a civil union bill (proyecto de ley n. 20.888) to the Legislative Assembly in early July 2018. Under the bill, same-sex couples would be granted almost all of the rights of marriage, including pension, tax benefits, housing, immigration rights, etc., via the recognition of civil unions rather than marriages. It was rejected by the Human Rights Committee on October 15, 2019. A second, similar bill was presented in September 2019 by the New Republic and Social Christian Unity parliamentary groups. It would have established the legal figure of "civil cohabitations" (convivientes civiles) for same-sex couples. However, it would not have granted the same rights as marriage, notably concerning adoption rights, access to loans, citizenship for non-citizens who marry a Costa Rican national, and divorce settlements. It was introduced to the Legislative Assembly on February 18, 2020. The bill was criticized by other parties, including the conservative National Restoration Party, whose speaker, Eduardo Cruickshank Smith, described it as "irresponsible and populist". or A law recognizing same-sex de facto unions (unión de hecho) was published in the official gazette on May 31, 2022. A couple can enter into a de facto union after two years of cohabitation and provided they live together in a public and stable manner. Couples in de facto unions have the same legal implications as in a marriage. Article 242 of the Family Code was amended to read: A de facto union between two persons who have the legal capacity to contract marriage, who have lived together in a public, notorious, unique and stable manner for more than two years, will have all the patrimonial effects of a legally formalized marriage. (Note: Spanish: La unión de hecho pública, notoria, única y estable, por más de dos años, entre dos personas que posean aptitud legal para contraer matrimonio, surtirá todos los efectos patrimoniales propios del matrimonio formalizado legalmente.)

== Same-sex marriage ==
Homosexuality laws in Central America and the Caribbean Islands. Same-sex marriage Other type of partnership Unregistered cohabitation No recognition of same-sex couples Constitution limits marriage to opposite-sex couples Same-sex sexual activity illegal but law not enforced

=== History ===
On May 23, 2006, the Supreme Court ruled against same-sex marriages. In a 5–2 decision, the court ruled that it was not required by the Constitution of Costa Rica to recognize same-sex marriage in family law.

On March 19, 2015, a bill to legalize same-sex marriage was introduced to the Legislative Assembly by Deputy Ligia Elena Fallas Rodríguez from the Broad Front. On December 10, 2015, the organization Front for Equal Rights (Frente por los Derechos Igualitarios) and a group of deputies from the Citizens' Action Party, the National Liberation Party and the Broad Front presented another bill. The bill was submitted to the Assembly on January 28, 2016. In December 2016, the Citizens' Action Party announced its support for same-sex marriage, calling for same-sex couples to receive the same rights as opposite-sex couples, including adoption. A few days later, President Luis Guillermo Solís, a member of PAC, confirmed his personal opposition to same-sex marriage, but restated his commitment to approving a partnership law for same-sex couples.

Costa Rica saw its first same-sex marriage in 2015. The couple, Laura Florez-Estrada and Jasmine Elizondo, were able to marry due to a clerical error where Elizondo was accidentally recorded as the opposite gender at birth. The civil registry filed a criminal complaint against the couple. In February 2019, the prosecutor's office dropped a court case against the couple.

In April 2017, a Costa Rican citizen and a Mexican citizen who had previously wed in Mexico asked the Costa Rican embassy in Mexico City to recognize their same-sex marriage. The civil registry denied their request, based on the country's same-sex marriage ban. The couple appealed to the Supreme Electoral Court and said they were considering a possible appeal to the Supreme Court or the Inter-American Court of Human Rights if necessary.

In November 2017, Costa Rica hosted a conference on the marital rights of same-sex couples across Latin America. Speaking at the conference, Vice President Ana Helena Chacón, one of Costa Rica's two vice presidents, announced her support for same-sex marriage.

=== 2018 Inter-American Court of Human Rights advisory opinion ===
On 9 January 2018, the Inter-American Court of Human Rights (IACHR) issued an advisory opinion that parties to the American Convention on Human Rights should grant same-sex couples "accession to all existing domestic legal systems of family registration, including marriage, along with all rights that derive from marriage". The advisory opinion states that:

The State must recognize and guarantee all rights derived from a family bond between persons of the same sex in accordance with the provisions of Articles 11.2 and 17.1 of the American Convention. (...) in accordance with articles 1.1, 2, 11.2, 17, and 24 of the American Convention, it is necessary to guarantee access to all the existing figures in domestic legal systems, including the right to marry. (..) To ensure the protection of all the rights of families formed by same-sex couples, without discrimination with respect to those that are constituted by heterosexual couples.

The Costa Rican Government announced that it would abide by the opinion. Vice President Ana Helena Chacón said that the ruling would be adopted in "its totality". The Foreign Ministry notified the Judiciary, the Supreme Electoral Court (responsible for the civil registry) and the Legislative Assembly about the advisory opinion on January 12.

The first same-sex couple was scheduled to get married on January 20. However, on January 18 the Superior Council of Notaries stated that notaries could not perform same-sex marriages until provisions in the Family Code prohibiting such marriages are changed by the Legislative Assembly or struck down by the Supreme Court. The couple announced their intention to challenge the council's decision in the Constitutional Chamber of the Supreme Court (Sala IV). Minister of Justice and Peace Marco Feoli Villalobos reiterated that the IACHR opinion was fully binding on Costa Rica.

==== Reaction ====
Costa Rica has long been committed to the Inter-American juridical system, and Article 7 of the Constitution of Costa Rica explicitly states that the country's international agreements take precedence over national laws. The Costa Rican Supreme Court has repeatedly ruled that the IACHR is the definitive interpreter of the American Convention on Human Rights and that all of the court's opinions are fully binding on Costa Rica.

LGBT activists and human rights groups celebrated the IACHR opinion, while the Catholic Church and evangelical groups condemned it. The ruling was met with outrage among conservative and evangelical groups, who argued that the court had "disrespected" Costa Rica's laws. Some opponents of the advisory opinion called for the country to leave the jurisdiction of the court, which would require a constitutional amendment. Several supporters of the opinion argued that local legislation was not required to legalise same-sex marriage, citing a 2016 court decision regarding the legalisation of in vitro fertilisation (IVF), in which the IACHR stated that presidential and/or governmental decrees are sufficient to implement its opinions.

Most of the candidates in the February 2018 presidential elections announced their support for or willingness to respect the IACHR advisory opinion, with the exception of Fabricio Alvarado, Stephanie Campos and Mario Rendondo, all of them from minor Christian parties. Other candidates had already been in favor of same-sex marriage before the IACHR opinion, including former Labor and Social Security Minister Carlos Alvarado Quesada from the governing Citizens' Action Party (PAC), left-leaning Deputy Edgardo Araya and labor union activist Jhon Vega. The remaining candidates signaled that they were personally opposed to same-sex marriage but willing to accept the court opinion. Fabricio Alvarado, an evangelist of the National Restoration Party, claimed that the court had "violated" Costa Rica's sovereignty. In the days following the IACHR advisory opinion, Alvarado began polling in first place with 17%, up from 3-5% prior to the ruling. Support for Carlos Alvarado, a pro-same-sex marriage candidate, also increased considerably.

In the February 2018 elections, the National Liberation Party (PLN) remained the largest party in the Legislative Assembly, while several previously minor Christian parties, including the National Restoration Party, made significant gains. As of July 2018, eight of the ten PAC deputies and José María Villalta, the sole Broad Front deputy, support same-sex marriage. The remaining two PAC deputies and all the deputies from PLN, the Social Christian Unity Party (PUSC), the Social Christian Republican Party (PRSC) and the National Integration Party (PIN) expressed their support for same-sex civil partnerships only. Of the 14 deputies of the ultra-conservative National Restoration Party, 12 did not answer, and two expressed their opposition to same-sex marriage without clarifying if they would support same-sex civil partnerships. In the presidential runoff between Carlos Alvarado and Fabricio Alvarado on April 1, 2018, dubbed by some media outlets as a "de facto referendum on same-sex marriage", same-sex marriage supporter Carlos Alvarado won with over 60% of the vote. Following his win, he said: "I will lead a government for all and all. That shelters all people, without any distinction."

=== 2018 Supreme Court ruling ===
The Supreme Court of Justice of Costa Rica (Corte Suprema de Justicia de Costa Rica) issued a ruling in favor of same-sex marriage in August 2018.

On January 24, the Center for Justice and International Law (Cejil) asked the Constitutional Chamber of the Supreme Court (Sala IV) to rule on the issue of same-sex marriage quickly. On January 25, the Superior Council of Notaries clarified its position, stating that notaries could not perform same-sex marriages until the civil registry issued guidelines on the registration of such marriages. Despite this, one same-sex couple was married by a notary in February 2018. The notary in question faced an investigation, but rejected any wrongdoing, stating that he respected international law and took a stand against discrimination when marrying the couple. The marriage was later annulled. An additional eight same-sex couples had applied for marriage licenses by May 2018.

On February 22, 2018, La Nación reported that the Sala IV was reviewing six lawsuits seeking the legalization of same-sex marriage in the country. On March 9, 2018, the Attorney General, Emilia Navas Aparicio, recommended to the court to abide by the IACHR ruling and declare article 14 of the Family Code, which prohibited same-sex marriage, unconstitutional. On May 14, the Supreme Electoral Court stated that same-sex couples could not get married unless article 14 of the Family Code was either repealed by the Legislative Assembly or struck down by the Supreme Court.

On July 18, it was announced that the Sala IV would rule on two lawsuits from 2013 and 2015 challenging the constitutionality of articles 14 and 242 of the Family Code, as well as article 4 of the 2013 General Young Person's Act, in the first half of August 2018. On August 3, the Commissioner for LGBTI Population Affairs of the Presidency of the Republic, Luis Salazar, presented a letter asking the Sala IV to legalize same-sex marriage, signed by 182 public figures, including former presidents Luis Guillermo Solís, Laura Chinchilla, Óscar Arias and Abel Pacheco. On August 8, 2018, the Sala IV declared all three of the articles in question unconstitutional and gave the Legislative Assembly 18 months (from the publication of the ruling) to amend the laws accordingly. If the Assembly did not comply, both same-sex marriage and same-sex de facto unions would automatically become legal when the deadline passed. The ruling was welcomed by President Carlos Alvarado Quesada, but several lawmakers expressed doubts that the Legislative Assembly would amend the law before the deadline. On November 14, the court released the full written ruling, which was published in the judicial bulletin on November 26, 2018, setting a deadline for May 26, 2020.

In anticipation of the ruling taking effect, a decree giving same-sex couples access to housing allowance if they have been living together for three years was issued in December 2019 and published in the official gazette (La Gaceta) in February 2019. The decree was adopted in compliance with the 2018 IACHR ruling.

==== Legislative efforts to postpone ====
In February 2019, a group of conservative deputies introduced a constitutional amendment to ban same-sex marriage, which according to the deputies was supported by 150,000 citizens. The bill sought to amend Article 52 of the Constitution from the current text: "Marriage is the essential basis of the family and rests on the equal rights of the spouses" to "Marriage is the union of a man and a woman, rests on the equal rights of the spouses, and is the essential basis of the family." The launch of the initiative was attended by the PNR bloc, Independent Deputy Erick Rodríguez Steller, Patricia Villegas Álvarez from the National Integration Party, Shirley Díaz Mejías from the Social Christian Unity Party, and a faction of the Social Christian Republican Party. Constitutional amendments require a two-thirds majority in the Legislative Assembly. The proposal was not approved.

On May 12, 2020, a motion requesting that the Supreme Court postpone the application of the ruling to allow more time to legislate due to the COVID-19 pandemic, signed by 26 deputies, was presented to the President of the Legislative Assembly, Eduardo Cruickshank Smith. On May 19, the Assembly rejected a proposition by Cruickshank to put the motion at the top of the Assembly's agenda, with 33 votes against and 20 in favor.

May 19, 2020 vote in the Legislative Assembly of Costa Rica
Party	Votes for	Votes against	Absent (Did not vote)
National Liberation Party	2: Luis Antonio Aiza Campos; David Gourzong Cerdas	14: Carlos Ricardo Benavides Jiménez; Silvia Hernandez Sánchez; Ana Karine Niño Gutiérrez; Roberto Thompson Chacón; Maria José Corrales Chacón; Daniel Ulate Valenciano; Paola Valladares Rosado; Luis Fernando Chacón Monge; Ana Lucia Delgado Orozco; Jorge Fonseca Fonseca; Aida Maria Montiel Hector; Franggi Nicolas Solano; Gustavo Viales Villegas; Yorleni Leon Marchena	1: Wágner Jiménez Zuñiga
Citizens' Action Party	–	9: Nielsen Pérez Pérez; Victor Morales Mora; Paola Vega Rodriguez; Enrique Sánchez Carballo; Carolina Hidalgo Herrera; Luis Ramón Carranza Cascante; Mario Castillo Mendez; Laura Guido Perez; Catalina Montero Gómez	1: Welmer Ramos González
Social Christian Unity Party	2: Shirley Díaz Mejías; Oscar Cascante Cascante	6: María Vita Monge Granados; Aracelly Salas Eduarte; Pablo Heriberto Abarca Mora; José María Villalta Florez-Estrada; Erwen Yanan Masís Castro; Pedro Muñoz Fonseca	2: María Inés Solís Quirós; Rodolfo Peña Flores
National Restoration Party	7: Eduardo Cruickshank Smith; Giovanni Gómez Obando; Mileidy Alvarado Arias; Floria Segreda Sagot; Mélvin Nuñez Piña; Carlos Avendaño Calvo; Xiomara Rodríguez Hernández	–	–
New Republic Bloc	6: Carmen Chan Mora (independiente, curul 48); Harllan Hoepelman Paez (independiente, curul 7); Jonathan Prendas Rodríguez (independiente, curul 43); Nidia Céspedes Cisneros (independiente, curul 23); Marulin Azofeifa Trejos (independiente, curul 54); Ignacio Alpizar Castro (independiente, curul 24)	–	–
National Integration Party	1: Patricia Villegas Álvarez	1: Walter Muñoz Céspedes	–
Social Christian Republican Party	1: Dragos Dolanescu Valenciano	1: Otto Roberto Vargas Víquez	–
Broad Front	-	1: José María Villalta Florez-Estrada	–
Independents	1: Erick Rodríguez Steller	2: Zoila Volio Pacheco; Ivonne Acuña Cabrera	–
Total	20	33	4

==== Entry into force ====
Consequently, the court ruling went into effect on May 26, 2020. The first marriage ceremony of a same-sex couple, Alexandra Quirós Castillo and Dunia Daritza Araya Arguedas, was broadcast by the state-owned Canal 13 at midnight on May 26. Several other ceremonies took place later that day.

State officials later clarified that married same-sex couples are permitted to adopt. In a June 2020 interview, Jorge Urbina Soto, coordinator of the National Children's Institute (PANI, Patronato Nacional de la Infancia), stated that all prospective adoptive parents are evaluated for eligibility irrespective of sexual orientation or sex. The Supreme Electoral Tribunal also clarified that if a married lesbian couple conceives a child through assisted insemination, the non-biological mother will be automatically recognized as the child's legal mother.

The Supreme Court ruled in June 2020 that judges appointed prior to the legalisation of same-sex marriage can refuse to preside over such a marriage, provided they have notified the Superior Council of the Judiciary and a replacement judge has been found. Judges appointed since the legalisation of same-sex marriage cannot refuse to solemnize the marriage.

In July 2020, the Costa Rican Association of Travel Agencies (ACAV) stated that the legalisation of same-sex marriage would increase tourism in Costa Rica and help boost the country's weakened economy after the COVID-19 pandemic.

=== Statistics ===
82 same-sex couples married the first week after the legalisation of same-sex marriages. Data from the National Institute of Statistics and Census of Costa Rica shows that the majority of same-sex marriages are performed in San José Province:

Province	2020	2021	2022
Alajuela	74	148	115
Cartago	41	64	49
Guanacaste	18	39	41
Heredia	67	95	81
Limón	11	17	25
Puntarenas	32	56	42
San José	255	419	324
Total	498	838	677

== Public opinion ==
A poll conducted between January 4 and 10, 2012 by La Nación showed that 55% of Costa Ricans supported the statement "same-sex couples should have the same rights as heterosexual couples", while 41% were opposed. Support was higher among people aged 18–34, at 60%. According to a Pew Research Center survey conducted between November 9 and December 19, 2013, 29% of Costa Ricans supported same-sex marriage, while 61% were opposed.

A poll carried out in August 2016 by the Centro de Investigación y Estudios Políticos (CIEP) indicated that 49% of Costa Ricans opposed the legal recognition of same-sex unions, while 45% supported it and 6% were unsure. The 2017 AmericasBarometer showed that 35% of Costa Ricans supported same-sex marriage. A poll published in January 2018 by CIEP suggested that 35% of the Costa Rican population supported same-sex marriage, with 59% opposed.

== See also ==
- Timeline of LGBTQ history in Costa Rica
- LGBT rights in Costa Rica
- Recognition of same-sex unions in the Americas
