= LGBTQ history in Panama =

There is evidence of sexual diversity that existed with the indigenous population in Panama, before the arrival of the Spanish colonizers in the 15th century. During the colonial period, it was largely suppressed as they imposed strict gender binarization and persecuted those who did not conform to it.

After the end of colonialism, in the 20th century, the LGBTQ people still faced marginalization and criminalization, and violence. Laws criminalized homosexuality in the late 1940s and the community faced further repression during military rule (1968–1989), during which abuse and imprisonment of such people were widely prevalent.

After the military dictatorship ended in 1989, the visibility and expression of the LGBTQ community increased, with the formation of new organizations fighting for their rights, and public events. In the 21st century, legal reforms led to decriminalization of homosexuality, and granted legal gender recognition.

== Colonial period ==
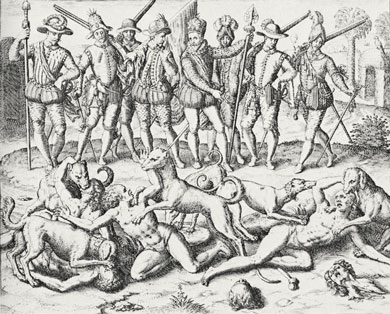
Indigenous people accused of sodomy being killed by dogs, under the orders of Vasco Núñez de Balboa

The culture of the indigenous population incorporated sexual diversity with the mythological figure of Wigudun in the Guna culture represented as a combined soul of two spirits who personified male and female qualities. During the Spanish colonial period, between the 15th and 17th centuries, various sexual practices including sodomy between same sex individuals amongst the indigenous population were recorded by the Europeans. The European settlers used these practices to fuel homophobia, and associated them to natural disasters and diseases, using these beliefs as a divine justification for their intervention.

The colonizers imposed a gender binarization and punished any gender expression that did not conform to the norms. Derogatory terms like "berdache" were used to describe these men. A notable case was the punishment ordered by Vasco Núñez de Balboa in 1513, when about forty native transvestites were fed to the dogs in Panama, marking the first record of such punishment for sodomy in Latin America. As the gender diversity was suppressed by the colonizers, indigenous beliefs and customs became concealed under the Western influence.

== Twentieth century ==
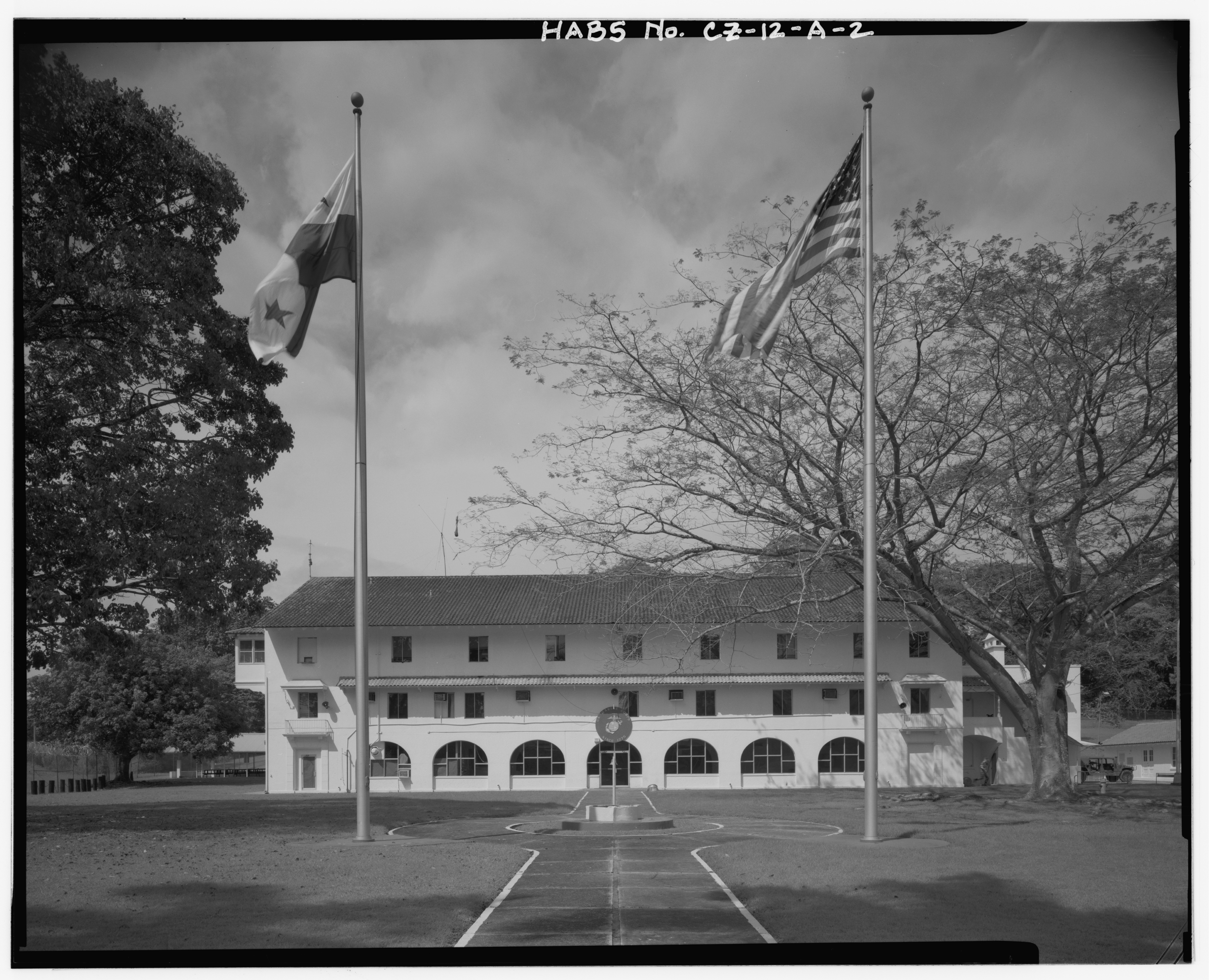
U.S. naval base Vasco Núñez de Balboa, located in the Panama Canal Zone

During the presence of the United States in Panama, there was an existence of gay subculture in the U.S. military bases. It was common to see both women and men waiting at the entrances of the military bases, which became ideal places for prostitution and same-sex sexual encounters. Joaquin Beleño, in his literary work Los Forzados de Gamboa (1991), describes that homosexuals were picturesque characters who, despite being despised by most men, brought a touch of color and distraction to the lives of inmates. Donoghue Michael in his work, Borderland on the Isthmus: Race, Culture, and the Struggle for the Canal Zone (2014), highlights that U.S. efforts to control sexual activity at the borders of its military enclaves with the Panama Canal area police regularly arresting sexual offenders. They were also assigned fake identities and used to fulfill the U.S. mission objectives.

During the presidency of Domingo Díaz Arosemena, on 20 May 1949, the Executive Decree No. 149 was enacted, which included repressive measures on "social hygiene and public morality" under which homosexuality was criminalized and carried a prison term of three months to one year and fine of $50 to $500. During this period, local literature began to evolve in the form of expression and resistance against the same. In 1957, Tristan Solarte published El drownado, starring a bisexual character named Rafael, one of the earliest LGBT characters in Panamanian literature, and reflected the internal struggle and complexity of LGBT identities in a context of repression and marginalization from the society.

During the military regimes in Panama (1968–1989), there was a severe repression and persecution of the LGBT community, and dissidents often faced imprisonment, verbal and physical abuse, and sexual rape along with the political prisoners. During the dictatorship of Manuel Antonio Noriega, dissidents were threatened with rape and subjected to humiliation, including being told that they would be placed in cells with AIDS prisoners. Noriega, despite being a bisexual himself, which was kept a secret, and having had a close circle consisting of several homosexual men, showed hypocrisy and double standards against the LGBT community.

Sexual violence was common in Panamanian prisons where homosexuals were often raped by both other inmates and police officers. These violations were also used as punishment and warning for political opponents and dissidents. At night, officers sometimes allowed transvestites into the cells to be sexually abused by criminals. In the late 1980s, places like the La Madrid bar in Panama's Old Town came up, offering a save haven for the socially marginalized and prosecuted LGBTQ community.

After the end of the military regime in 1989, the 1990s was marked by a significant improvement in the visibility and organization of LGBTQ populations in the country, with greater acceptance and social recognition. In 1996, writer Javier Stanziola won the National Literature Competition with his LGBTQ themed play De mangos y albaricoques. On 29 June 1996, Asociación Hombres y Mujeres Nuevos de Panamá (New Men and Women Association of Panama), the first LGBTQ organization in the country, was founded, and offered support and defense of the rights of the community. In 1998, the LGBTQ people were granted permission for the first time to march openly during the annual Panama Carnival. Though this was criticized by conservative and religious groups, this marked a significant moment in the visibility and celebration of sexual diversity in the country.

== Twenty first century ==
On 4 September 2001, the New Men and Women Association of Panama received legal and official recognition from the Panamanian State, which laid the foundation for greater advocacy for community rights and visibility of the LGBTQ people. In 2004, the first edition of the LGBTQ Pride March was held in Panama City On 29 July 2008, president Martín Torrijos Espino issued Executive Decree No. 332, which decriminalized homosexuality in Panama. This decree, which came into effect on 31 July, eliminated laws criminalizing consensual same-sex adult relations.

In 2016, Candy Pamela Gonzalez became the first transgender woman to obtain authorization to legally change her name and gender, without the need for gender-affirming surgery. In 2019, the National Assembly first passed a constitutional reform to ban same-sex marriage, prompting protests from the community. Later, it was suspended based on president Laurentino Cortizo's request.

On 1 March 2023, the Supreme Court of Justice of Panama issued an opinion stating that the prohibition of same-sex marriage is not unconstitutional. This decision was met with criticism, and on 24 March, the Inter-American Commission expressed its regret on the Supreme Court ruling and urged Panama to guarantee the rights of same-sex couples.

== See also ==
- LGBT rights in the Americas
- LGBTQ rights in Panama
- Same-sex marriage in Panama
- Timeline of LGBTQ history in Panama
