= LGBTQ rights in Costa Rica =

- Costa Rica
- Legal status: Legal since 1971
- Gender identity: Transgender people allowed to change legal gender
- Military: No armed forces
- Discrimination protections: Sexual orientation protections since 1998

Family rights
- Recognition of relationships: Same-sex marriage since 2020
- Adoption: Full adoption rights since 2020

Lesbian, gay, bisexual, transgender, and queer (LGBTQ) rights in Costa Rica have evolved significantly in the past decades. Same-sex sexual relations have been legal since 1971. In January 2018, the Inter-American Court of Human Rights made mandatory the approbation of same-sex marriage, adoption for same-sex couples and the removal of people's sex from all Costa Rican ID cards issued since October 2018. The Costa Rican Government announced that it would apply the rulings in the following months. In August 2018, the Costa Rican Supreme Court ruled against the country's same-sex marriage ban, and gave the Legislative Assembly 18 months to reform the law accordingly, otherwise the ban would be abolished automatically. Same-sex marriage became legal on 26 May 2020.

Human Rights Watch has described Costa Rica as "committ[ed] to [equal] rights" and an "inspiration for other countries [in Central America]". Discrimination on the basis of sexual orientation is prohibited in employment and other areas, and transgender people are permitted to change their legal gender on official identity documents to reflect their gender identity, including driver's licenses, passports, and ID cards.

== Legality of same-sex sexual activity ==
Homosexuality first became classified as a crime during Spanish rule. After gaining independence, it remained a crime until the liberal presidency of Tomás Guardia (1870-76, 1877-82). While it was decriminalized during this era as part of a larger reform of the legal system, homosexuality was still widely seen as an "infamous sin".

In 1971, a universal age of consent was established (15), as was a new law that prohibited "scandalous sodomy" (presumably public, no known convictions are in record) but otherwise maintained the legal status of private homosexual sex acts between consenting adults. Article 382 in the Penal Code that mentioned "scandalous sodomy" was repealed in 2002, alongside many other laws.

=== Apology ===
On 1 July 2018, President Carlos Alvarado Quesada issued a public apology to members of the LGBT community for the past persecution and discrimination they faced from the Costa Rican state. The President stated that the state had in the past "promoted and executed persecutions, raids, arbitrary arrests and beatings" towards LGBT people. He also spoke of the Stonewall riots, which led to the modern gay rights movement, and that Costa Rica had legalised homosexuality two years later, in 1971, but that discrimination and violence continued for the following decades.

On behalf of the Government of the Republic, I ask your forgiveness and I renew my commitment to fight so that this shameful chapter of our history will not be repeated.

— President Carlos Alvarado Quesada, 1 July 2018

== Recognition of same-sex relationships ==
In 2006, the Supreme Court rejected a claim that the Constitution of Costa Rica requires the recognition of same-sex marriages. Human rights lawyer Yashin Castrillo Fernandez had sued arguing that certain constitutional provisions relating to equal rights and international law required the legalization of same-sex marriage, but only two of the justices agreed. The majority wrote that at the time the Constitution was approved, "marriage" was understood to be a union between a man and a woman. The court decision did state that the government had the power to enact civil unions.

In 2008, the LGBT rights association, Diversity Movement, persuaded some lawmakers to introduce a civil union bill. Deputies Ana Helena Chacón (then of the Social Christian Unity Party, currently of the Citizens' Action Party) and José Merino (Broad Front) expressed support for the proposed bill stating that "gays and lesbians are no less Costa Rican than the rest of us. We're not talking about marriage or adoption, but about basic civil rights."

In July 2010, the Constitutional Court ordered the TSE (Supreme Elections Tribunal) to halt a proposed referendum on the recognition of same-sex unions. The referendum was supposed to be held on 5 December 2010. The recurso de amparo (appeal) was presented by lawyer Quirós Salazar, alleging that the referendum proposal violated the rights and freedoms of individuals. The petition for a referendum had been organized by the Observatorio de la Familia, a religious conservative group, seeking to stop legislation to recognise civil unions for same-sex couples.

On 1 July 2013, the Legislative Assembly passed legislation that grants benefits of domestic partnerships "without discrimination contrary to human dignity". Progressive lawmakers indicated during debate that the changes would open civil unions to same-sex couples. Conservative lawmakers immediately called upon President Laura Chinchilla to veto the legislation, claiming that they mistakenly voted for the bill. Chinchilla refused to oppose the bill's passage and signed it into law days later. The bill took effect on 8 July 2013. On 10 July 2013, six same-sex couples asked courts to have their relationships recognized as a domestic partnership. A day later, a family court accepted one of the petitions.

In mid-March 2015, two government proposals on civil unions were submitted to the Legislative Assembly. On 19 March 2015, a bill to legalise same-sex marriage was introduced to the Legislative Assembly by Deputy Ligia Elena Fallas Rodríguez from the Broad Front.

=== 2018 Inter-American Court of Human Rights advisory opinion and legalisation ===
On 9 January 2018, the Inter-American Court of Human Rights (IACHR) issued an advisory opinion that parties to the American Convention on Human Rights should grant same-sex couples "accession to all existing domestic legal systems of family registration, including marriage, along with all rights that derive from marriage".

The Costa Rican Government quickly announced that it will abide by the opinion, and legalise same-sex marriage. The Superior Council of Notaries however refused to issue marriage licenses to same-sex couples until the ban was explicitly struck down by the Supreme Court or repealed by the Legislative Assembly. Despite this, one same-sex couple successfully married before a notary in February 2018. The notary in question faced an investigation, but rejected any wrongdoing, stating that he respected international law and took a stand against discrimination when marrying the couple. The marriage was later annulled.

Lawsuits seeking to legalise same-sex marriage went before the Supreme Court of Justice of Costa Rica. In August 2018, the Supreme Court ruled in favour of lifting the same-sex marriage ban, giving the country's legislators 18 months to legalise same-sex marriage. On 14 November, the Court released the full written ruling, which was published in the judicial bulletin on 26 November 2018, setting a deadline for 26 May 2020. As legislators took no steps to legalise same-sex marriage before the deadline, same-sex marriage became legal on 26 May 2020.

== Adoption and parenting ==
Mario Núñez, a member of the Libertarian Movement Party, introduced a bill in the Legislative Assembly in 2007 to ban LGBT people and same-sex couples from adopting or having custody of children. The bill was not successful.

Married same-sex couples have been able to legally adopt since May 2020, in light of the legalisation of same-sex marriage in Costa Rica. In a June 2020 interview, Jorge Urbina Soto, coordinator of the National Children's Institute (PANI, Patronato Nacional de la Infancia) stated that all prospective adoptive parents are evaluated for eligibility irrespective of sexual orientation or sex. The Supreme Electoral Tribunal also clarified that if a married lesbian couple conceives a child through assisted insemination, the non-biological mother will be automatically recognized as the child's legal mother.

In February 2025, the Constitutional Court recognized the right to co-maternity leave for same-sex couples. It recognized the right of non-gestational mothers of same-sex couples to a 4-week maternity leave in accordance with the law. The decision is not yet effective as it has not been published in El Diario La Gaceta.

== Discrimination protections ==
The Constitution of Costa Rica does not explicitly prohibit discrimination on the basis of sexual orientation or gender identity; however, Article 28 states that nobody can be persecuted for their opinions or acts (if they are not against the law) and, Article 33 states that everyone is equal under the law.

Under Article 48 of the 1998 Costa Rican HIV/AIDS law (ley núm. 7771 general sobre el VIH-SIDA), "sexual option" is one of the categories in which discrimination is generally prohibited in areas such as employment. The article reads:

Who ever applies, arranges or practices discriminatory measures because of race, nationality, gender, age, political, religious or sexual option, social position, economic situation, marital status or by any suffering of health or disease, will be sanctioned with penalty of twenty to sixty days fines. The judge will be able to impose, in addition, the disqualifying penalty that corresponds, of fifteen to sixty days.

In 2020, the Legislative Assembly passed multiple pieces of legislation to strengthen anti-discrimination laws on the basis of sexual orientation. This amended article 112 of the Penal Code to provide twenty to thirty-five years' imprisonment for hate crimes motivated by the victim(s)' sexual orientation, among other characteristics, article 380 to provide one to three years' imprisonment for "excluding, segregating or distinguishing" a person on account of their sexual orientation in order to limit, restrict or deny their rights and freedoms, and article 386bis to provide three to ten years' imprisonment for inflicting physical or mental pain or suffering, intimidation, coercion or blackmail on the basis of sexual orientation. Legislators also amended law n° 9343 on the labor market to read:

Any discrimination in the workplace against people for reasons of age, ethnicity, sex, religion, race, sexual orientation, marital status, political opinion, national ancestry, social origin, filiation, disability, union membership, economic situation, caregiver status, or any other analogous form of discrimination is prohibited.

== Transgender rights ==
Prior to 2018, changing the sex assigned at birth was not allowed. Article 51 of the Organic Law of the Supreme Electoral Tribunal and the Civil Registry (Spanish: Ley Orgánica del Tribunal Supremo de Elecciones y del Registro Civil) includes sex as one of the requirements to register births. Article 2 of the Regulations on Photographs for Identity Documents (Reglamento de Fotografías para la Cédula de Identidad) states: "Every person has the right to have their image and gender identity respected at the moment of taking the photograph that is attached to the identity card."

Since 2013, transgender people have been able to change their legal name on documentation so that it matches their gender identity. Sex reassignment surgery is not a requirement but a judicial order is required.

In 2016, a bill allowing transgender people to legally change their name and gender without the need for surgery or judicial permission was introduced to the Legislative Assembly. In June 2017, the bill advanced to the Human Rights Committee, and the Supreme Electoral Tribunal endorsed the bill, but it was ultimately unsuccessful.

On 14 May 2018, the Supreme Electoral Tribunal (TSE) approved a resolution allowing transgender people to change their name to reflect their gender identity on official ID cards. The decision came in response to the Inter-American Court of Human Rights ruling in January 2018 that all member countries, including Costa Rica, must provide full and equal rights to same-sex couples and citizens whose self-perceived gender is different from their birth gender. The tribunal declared that the process can be accomplished through a simple and free procedure. In addition, the TSE reported that in order to avoid stigmatizing effects, the gender a person is registered with at birth will no longer appear on identity documents.

On 28 June 2018, President Carlos Alvarado Quesada issued an executive decree requiring all state institutions to modify the documents and internal records of transgender people who wish to have their name, photograph or sex changed. The decree applies to passports, driving licenses, ID documents, work permits, university identification, etc. Costa Rican officials announced that this was in accordance with the January 2018 Inter-American Court of Human Rights ruling. In December 2018, President Alvarado signed another executive order extending this right to immigrants.

Additionally, hormone replacement therapy is financed by the state health system.

== Blood donation ==
In August 2007, a ban on gay and bisexual men donating blood was lifted. The drive to lift the ban was led by activist Alberto Cabezas.

== Living conditions ==
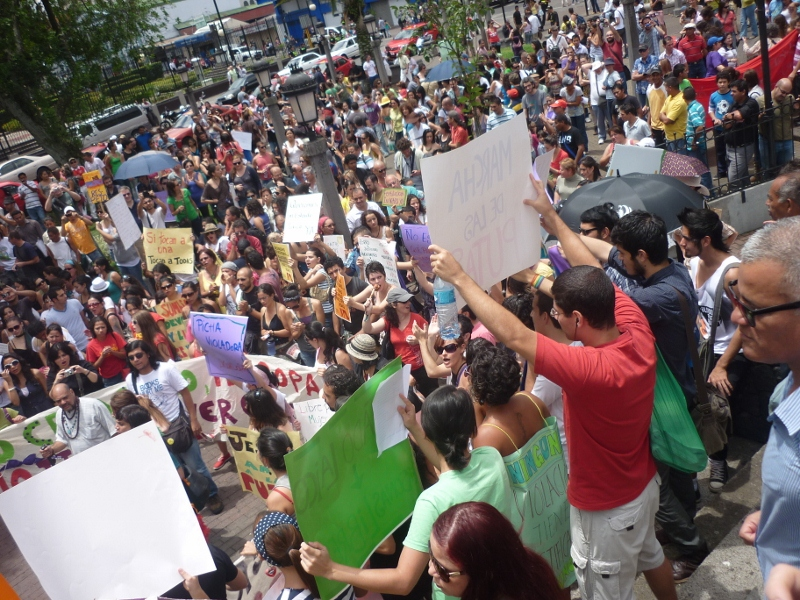
The Marcha de las putas (SlutWalk) in 2011 in San José, promoting women's rights and LGBT rights.

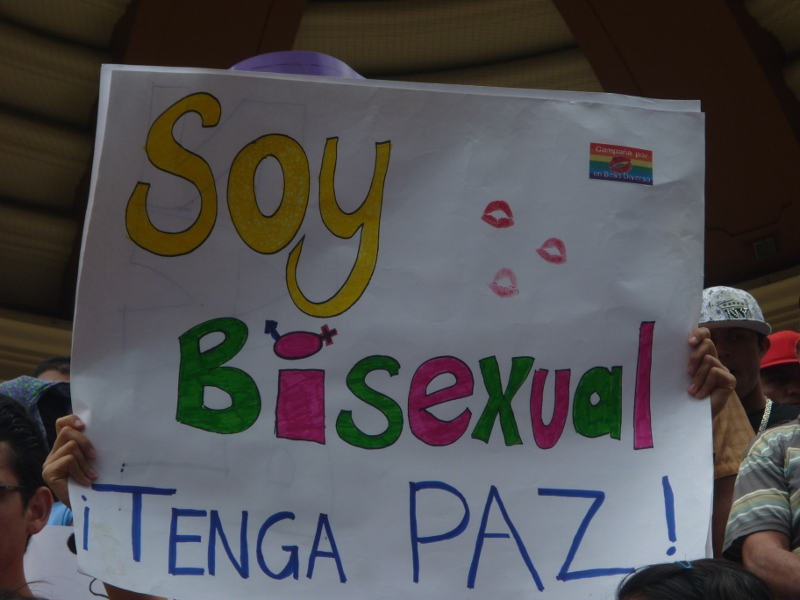
A sign at the Marcha de las putas in 2011, saying "I am bisexual, calm down!".

LGBTQ rights in Costa Rica have made significant cultural, social and legal progress since the 1970s. While certain politicians, such as President Óscar Arias, have expressed support for LGBTQ rights, Costa Ricans tended (and still do to an extent) to be socially conservative when it comes to sexual orientation and gender identity issues, in large part due to the strong influences of the Roman Catholic Church and cultural traditions about machismo.

While homosexuality was technically legal, police harassment and raids of LGBTQ people and private establishments were formerly commonplace. In 1987, the Letter of April 5th called for an end to discrimination against LGBTQ people and police raids in Costa Rica. In 1990, Minister of the Interior, the Police and Public Security Antonio Alvarez Desanti announced that he would not allow foreign women to enter Costa Rica to participate in an "Encuentro", an international meeting of lesbians. He instructed Costa Rican consulates not to grant visas to women travelling unaccompanied by men, warning that all such women would be stopped at the airport. He also informed airlines that if they sold tickets to women travelling alone, or appearing likely to attend the meeting, they would be required to provide for the suspected lesbians' immediate return. When pressed to explain how lesbians could be identified at the airport, he reportedly asserted that women who had short hair, wore pants or traveled alone could be identified as lesbians. Organizers changed the dates and location of the meeting, and it finally took place. Furthermore, the Costa Rican Government refused on multiple occasions to grant legal recognition to political organizations seeking to advance LGBTQ rights. These policies started to change in the 1990s, when the Supreme Court of Justice of Costa Rica ruled that the Constitution gave LGBTQ people the right to peaceful assembly, associate, create their own private establishments, as well as their own LGBTQ rights associations.

In 1993, it came to light that the Universidad Internacional de las Américas had a policy of expelling LGBTQ students and firing LGBTQ faculty and staff. When a HIV/AIDS education association, Instituto Latinoamericano de Educacion y Prevencion en Salud, filed a complaint with the Ministry of Education, they were unable to come up with a specific example of the university's policy being enforced, but the Ministry stated that if the policy was enforced it would probably violate Articles 20, 33, and 70 of the Constitution.

In the late 1990s, the Costa Rica Catholic Church organized protest against LGBTQ tourism, often arguing that it was a cover for sex tourism. In 1998, a planned LGBT pride festival was cancelled out of concern of the possibility of violence. During the initial planning of the event, President Miguel Ángel Rodríguez publicly opposed granting permits for the event to occur. In 1999, San José, Costa Rica's capital city, attempted to close down a gay sauna, but the Supreme Court in 2000 ordered the city to allow the sauna to remain open, stating, "subjective criteria of morality and proper behaviour have no legal basis ... and represent a violation of the fundamental rights granted by our Constitution".

On 27 March 2008, President Oscar Arias Sanchez signed an executive order designating 17 May as the National Day Against Homophobia, committing Costa Rica to join others around the world in working to eradicate bias against gays and lesbians.

In 2008, the Costa Rican Supreme Court ruled against a gay prison inmate receiving conjugal visits from his partner. In October 2011, the Supreme Court reversed its ruling and now allows equality for same-sex couples in receiving conjugal visits.

In 2012, the Citizens' Action Party presented a bill to declare the Legislative Assembly a "homophobia-free space" which later passed by a majority of votes, being opposed only by the Christian parties. On 21 April 2013, Carmen Muñoz (PAC) became the first openly lesbian member of Costa Rica's Legislative Assembly. On 1 May 2018, Enrique Sánchez became the first openly gay congressman in Costa Rica.

On 15 May 2014, the International Day Against Homophobia, Transphobia and Biphobia, President Luis Guillermo Solis placed a rainbow flag in the Presidential House. According to Guillermo Solis, this was "a symbolic act in support of all kinds of diversity, particularly for a group that has been severely discriminated". The act generated mixed reactions and was criticized by religious sectors of the country.

In December 2018, President Carlos Alvarado signed a number of executive decrees relating to housing rights for LGBTQ people, immigration rights for binational same-sex couples, and funding hormone replacement therapy through the state health system, among others.

In June 2019, President Carlos Alvarado Quesada became the first Costa Rican President to march at the annual gay pride parade in San José, a march that saw the participation of about 100,000 people. The early events in late 2000s saw the participation of about 20 people who received insults from bystanders.

=== Political party views ===
Recognition of same-sex unions under a different name than marriage (i.e. as civil unions) is supported by some of the main parties including the National Liberation Party (PLN), the Social Christian Unity (PUSC) and the now-defunct Libertarian Movement (ML). Left-wing party Broad Front was the first main party to support same-sex marriage. In December 2016, the Citizens' Action Party (PAC) officially announced its support of same-sex marriage and adoption. Some figures of PLN also support same-sex marriage, including some lawmakers. PUSC is opposed to same-sex marriage as a whole, while ML's presidential candidate, Otto Guevara, said during the 2014 presidential campaign that although he supports recognition for same-sex couples it is not a priority for him.

Opposition is frontal from a group of Christian parties; the National Restoration Party and its splinter, the New Republic Party, having between them a total of fourteen seats in the Assembly. They generally use filibusters to delay discussions on LGBTQ rights.

In 2012, controversy erupted when Justo Orozco, president of the Costa Rican Renewal Party, was head of the Legislative Assembly's Human Rights Committee. Protesters were upset that Orozco expressed support for the belief that homosexuality is a "sin" and a "treatable disease". As a result of the protests, future Vice President Ana Helena Chacón, then a PUSC member, moderated an official government meeting with protesters seeking to expand legal equality for same-sex couples.

The effect of the Inter-American Court of Human Rights's ruling on same-sex marriage caused uproar in the country and is often signaled and one of the main causes behind the divisive 2018 Costa Rican general election, in which the two main candidates were Fabricio Alvarado Muñoz (PRN), a conservative Evangelical and staunch opponent of same-sex marriage, and Carlos Alvarado Quesada (PAC), a liberal and staunch supporter.

=== Societal views ===
A 2013-2014 survey using samples from different religious backgrounds showed that support for LGBTQ rights was stronger among non-religious Costa Ricans, non-practicing Catholics and non-Christian minorities, whilst most practicing Catholics, Mainline Protestants and Neo-Pentecostals considered homosexuality as morally incorrect and "curable".

A poll conducted between January 4 and 10, 2012 by La Nación showed that 55% of Costa Ricans supported the statement "same-sex couples should have the same rights as heterosexual couples", while 41% were opposed. Support was higher among people aged 18–34, at 60%.

=== HIV/AIDS ===
While HIV/AIDS is not exclusively a problem for LGBTQ people, public health efforts to fight the spread of disease have raised public awareness of sexual orientation and gender identity issues.

Since the late 1990s, equal opportunity laws in Costa Rica have protected people living with HIV/AIDS. The law also stipulates that all persons living with HIV have a right to medical care, regardless of their nationality.

HIV/AIDS preventative programs for LGBTQ people are primarily handled by non-governmental organizations (NGOs). Comprehensive sex educational campaigns are almost nonexistent in public high schools because of opposition from the Catholic Church and other religious groups.

== Summary table ==
Same-sex sexual activity legal	Yes (Since 1971)
Equal age of consent (15)	Yes
Anti-discrimination laws in employment	Yes (Since 1998)
Anti-discrimination laws in the provision of goods and services	Yes
Anti-discrimination laws in all other areas (incl. indirect discrimination, hate speech)	Yes
Same-sex civil unions	Yes (Since 2013)
Same-sex marriages	Yes (Since 2020)
Recognition of same-sex couples	Yes
Stepchild adoption by same-sex couples	Yes (Since 2020)
Joint adoption by same-sex couples	Yes (Since 2020)
LGBTQ people allowed to serve openly in the military	Has no military (Allowed to serve openly in the civil defense Public Force)
Right to change legal gender	Yes (Since 2018)
Access to IVF for lesbian couples	Yes
Conversion therapy banned	No
Commercial surrogacy for gay male couples	No
MSMs allowed to donate blood	Yes (Since 2007)

== See also ==
- LGBTQ rights in the Americas
- Timeline of LGBTQ history in Costa Rica
- Same-sex marriage in Costa Rica
