= Letter of April 5th =

1987 Costa Rican document on LGBT rights

Letter of 5 April
- Created: 5 April 1987
- Location: La Nación
- Author: Promoted by Jacobo Schifter
- Signatories: 153 public, academic and cultural figures
- Subject: LGBT rights in Costa Rica

The Letter of 5 April (Spanish: Carta del 5 de abril) was a document published on 5 April 1987 in the newspaper La Nación in Costa Rica. It was promoted by researcher Jacobo Schifter and called for an end to discrimination against people of the LGBTQ community and an end to police raids in Costa Rica. The document was signed by 153 public, academic and cultural figures.

== Background ==
In the late 1980s, repression against the LGBT community in Costa Rica increased. This happened during the early years of the HIV/AIDS crisis, especially in the capital, San José. The Costa Rican authorities responded with police actions, including nighttime raids on places where gay men gathered. The government also required public employees to take blood tests showing that they were negative for HIV.

== Publication and content ==
The letter was published on page 37 of La Nación on 5 April 1987 as a paid advertisement. Its full title was Carta abierta a los señores Ministros de Salud, de Seguridad y Gobernación, Sr. Edgar Mohs, Sr. Hernán Garrón y Lic. Rolando Ramírez.

The letter was addressed to three ministers in the government of President Óscar Arias: Edgar Mohs, the minister of health; Hernán Garrón Salazar, the minister of public security; and Rolando Ramírez, the minister of government.

The document was signed by 153 professionals, politicians, academics and cultural figures. Among the signers were faculty members from the National University of Costa Rica and academics including Quince Duncan, Elizabeth Odio and Víctor Hugo Acuña.

== Impact ==
The letter became an important event in the history of the LGBT community in Costa Rica. It is considered a turning point in the struggle for LGBT rights in the country. After the letter was published, the police raids and the required blood tests for public employees were stopped.

== See also ==
- LGBT rights in Costa Rica
- Timeline of LGBTQ history in Costa Rica
