= Ross Cullen =

Ross Cullen may refer to:

- Ross Cullen (rugby union)
- Ross Cullen (cyclist)
