= Dayana Hernández =

Costa Rican transgender activist (1983–2024)

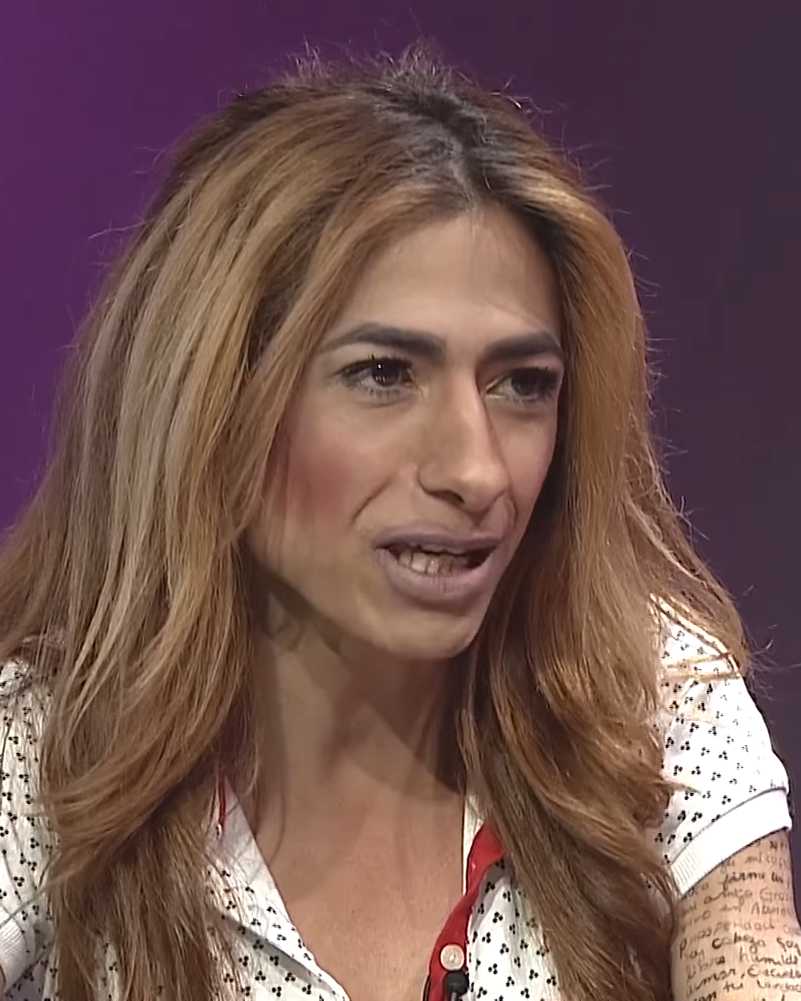
- Hernández in 2016
- Born: 15 July 1983 (age 43); San José, Costa Rica
- Died: 1 July 2024 (aged 40); San José, Costa Rica
- Education: National Institute of Apprenticeship
- Occupation: Human rights activist
- Years active: 2000–2024
- Organization: Transvida
- Political party: VAMOS

Dayana Hernández (15 July 1983 – 1 July 2024) was a Costa Rican human rights activist. She was known for her campaigns in support of transgender rights, particularly for sex workers, including improving access to education, employment and healthcare. In 2018, Hernández became the first trans woman to run as for election as a deputy to the Legislative Assembly of Costa Rica.

== Biography ==
Hernández was born on 15 July 1983 in San José, Costa Rica, into a Catholic family. After coming out as a trans woman, she was largely supported by her family. In 2002, Hernández underwent gender-affirming cosmetic surgery, including the injection of biopolymers into her hips, breasts, and buttocks. The procedure was botched, and Hernández struggled with poor health as a result of the procedure for the rest of her life, including osteomyelitis and mobility difficulties. In 2016, Hernández accused the Costa Rican Social Security Fund of negligence and gender violence, including a lack of appropriate and accurate medical attention paid to her post-surgery complications, and medical staff deadnaming her.

By the early 2000s, Hernández was working as a sex worker in San José; she did so for around 10 years. During this time, she started to campaign for transgender rights as well as rights for sex workers. After qualifying as a hairdresser, and later studying English, Portuguese and computing at the National Institute of Apprenticeship, Hernández was able to leave sex work and begin working at a call centre.

In 2009, Hernández co-founded, with Antonela Morales, Transvida, a non-governmental organisation focused on improving the quality of life for transgender people living in Costa Rica through promoting access to education, employment and medical care. Hernández and Morales were inspired to create Transvida following an increase in police harassment against trans sex workers, including the theft of their earnings; they were also concerned about the lack of rights sex workers had, and their greater exposure to sexually transmitted diseases and HIV/AIDS. Hernández served as Transvida's director and supported 75 trans women to attain their high school diploma or a university degree. In addition to her work with Transvida, Hernández also served as the Costa Rica coordinator for the regional transgender rights group REDLACTRANS, and collaborated with the Joint United Nations Programme on HIV/AIDS on preventative work.

In 2017, Hernández was announced as a candidate for the VAMOS party in the 2018 general election, running as second on the party's list for San José Province. She was the first trans woman to field a national election in Costa Rica, though she was forced to run under her birth name and gender due to gender transition not being recognised under Costa Rican law. During her campaign, Hernández called on the government to pass the Gender Identity Law, which had stalled in the Legislative Assembly; she also called for Costa Rica to be denoted as a secular state in its constitution, criticising the influence of church-led homophobia and transphobia in societal and legal prejudices against LGBTQ people. Hernández was not ultimately elected.

On 1 May 2018, Hernández led a public protest calling on a transgender labour quota to be introduced in Costa Rica, in addition to the legalisation and regulation of sex work. Hernández spoke out in support of sex workers, on the basis that the workers were voluntarily choosing to work in the sex industry, and stated that its legalisation would allow a fixed salary to be implemented for sex workers, in addition to accessing social security.

On 30 June 2024, during San José Pride, Transvida paid tribute to Hernández, who was in hospital, during their parade. The following day, Hernández died at the age of 40. It was later reported that Hernández had died of long-term health complications caused by "medical malpractice" following her 2004 gender-affirming surgery.

Transvida released a statement describing Hernández as "changing the hearts of many people". The LGBTQ support group Gafadis called her a "great example of struggle", while Ni una menos Costa Rica recognised Hernández's "tireless fight to share a message of respect, inclusion and anger at injustices". Hivos Latin America thanked her for "many years of activism, struggle and resilience".

Hernández funeral was held later on 1 July, at Valle de Paz in La Sabana.
