= Nicaragua Pride =

Annual LGBT demonstration in Nicaragua

- Frequency: Annually
- Location: Managua
- Country: Nicaragua
- Years active: 2005-2018
- Inaugurated: 2005
- Most recent: 2018

The LGBT Pride March of Nicaragua, commonly known as Nicaragua Pride, is an annual demonstration held in Nicaragua to commemorate the International LGBT Pride Day. Since 2006, the march has taken place in Managua, although the first edition, held in 2005, took place in Masaya.

The march, which gathers thousands of participants each year, is held to showcase the pride of Nicaragua’s LGBT communities and to demand equal rights. During the event, attendees march in colorful costumes, waving LGBT flags and accompanied by parade groups.

In Managua, the march traditionally takes place along the Carretera a Masaya (Masaya Highway), although in some years it has been relocated to other streets due to bans imposed by authorities.

Due to a ban by the National Police of Nicaragua on demonstrations not in support of the government of Daniel Ortega, the march has not been held since 2018.

== See also ==
LGBT rights in Nicaragua
