= Panama Pride =

LGBTQ event in Panama City

- Date: July 01
- Venue: Panama City
- Location: Panama City
- Type: Pride parade
- Motive: Promote education, inclusion, and the recognition of equal rights for the LGBTIQ+ community in Panama
- Participants: 13,000 people

The Panama Pride is an annual parade and festival held at the end of June in Panama City to celebrate lesbian, gay, bisexual, and transgender (LGBT) individuals and their allies.

== History ==
Panama City is considered to host the second-best Gay Pride event in Central America. It is also seen as an "LGBT-friendly" destination, offering numerous bars, recreation centers, and nightclubs that cater to the LGBT community.

The first Pride March in Panama took place in 2004, with just 60 people attending. The event was peaceful and was organized by the Asociación Hombres y Mujeres Nuevos de Panamá.

In 2005, another diversity march took place in Panama City, with around 100 participants.

By 2011, the first large-scale LGBTI pride march was held in Panama City. Over 20 drag queens participated, and more than 60 taxis joined a caravan with messages of support for diversity, where around 2,000 people attended.

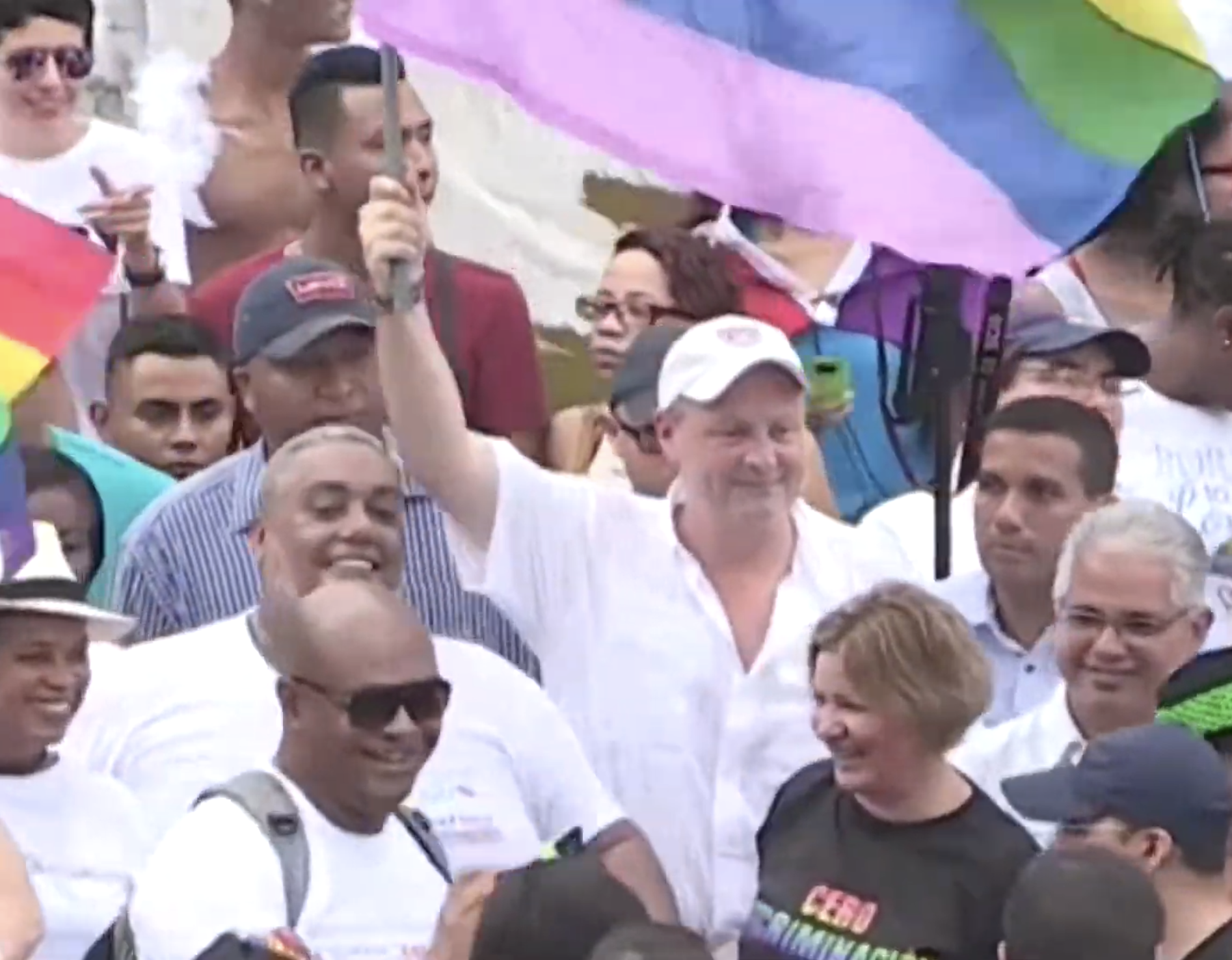
First lady of Panama, Lorena Castillo, during the 2017 Panama Pride.

In 2017, the march was held along the iconic Cinta Costera in Panama City. It drew around 5,000 participants and ended with a music festival. That year’s flag bearer was former First Lady Lorena Castillo de Varela.

In 2018, World Pride Panama announced that the march would take place in the Casco Viejo of the capital. It attracted 6,000 attendees and featured performances by local artists such as Samy y Sandra Sandoval, Kenny Man, and others.

The 2019 Pride Panama march was again held in Casco Viejo and saw a massive turnout of 12,000 participants.

In 2022, the Pride Festival was held on the modern Vía Argentina in Panama City. It made history with a record attendance of 13,000 people.

That same year, the western province of Chiriquí held its very first local Pride Parade.

In 2023, World Pride Panama organized a week-long series of educational events to mark Pride and Diversity Month. These activities began on Monday, June 26, and culminated with the Pride march on Saturday, July 1.

The 2023 march drew a historic crowd of over 15,000 people, who paraded along the Paseo de los Poetas to Plaza V Centenario in Casco Viejo. The celebration featured music, colorful decorations throughout the district, and vocal protests against a ruling by Panama’s Supreme Court that denied the right to same-sex marriage.

Also in 2023, the city of David in western Panama held its second LGBT Pride March. Attendance doubled from the previous year, with more than 200 people marching from Cervantes Central Park to the Mothers’ Park in the city’s north.
