= LGBTQ rights in Panama =

- Panama
- Legal status: Legal since 2008
- Gender identity: Change of legal gender allowed following sex reassignment surgery
- Military: No standing army
- Discrimination protections: No

Family rights
- Recognition of relationships: No
- Adoption: No

Lesbian, gay, bisexual, and transgender (LGBTQ) people in Panama face legal challenges not experienced by non-LGBTQ residents. Same-sex sexual activity is legal in Panama, but same-sex couples and households headed by same-sex couples are not eligible for the same legal benefits and protections available to opposite-sex married couples. In March 2023, the Supreme Court of Panama ruled that there is no right to same-sex marriage, despite a 2018 Inter-American Court of Human Rights advisory opinion that member states should grant same-sex couples access to all existing domestic legal systems of family registration. A constitutional amendment prohibiting same-sex marriage was approved by the National Assembly of Panama on October 29, 2019, but was withdrawn before the second vote and referendum required to bring it into force.

== History ==
The Guna people of northeastern Panama recognise a third gender. Such individuals as known as omeggid (literally like a woman; also spelt omegiid). In Guna society, if a young boy begins showing a tendency to act female, the family naturally accepts him and allows him to grow up in this way. Very often, omeggids will learn a skill that is typically associated with women, such as crafting molas (textiles). The omeggids are rooted in Guna mythology. According to Guna mythology, "the original leaders who brought the traditions, rules and guidelines for the Guna people to live by [are] a man named Ibeorgun, his sister Gigadyriai and his little brother Wigudun", who is an omeggid. According to certain reports, the Guna people are also accepting of homosexuality.

Following Spanish colonisation and the subsequent 300 years of Spanish rule, sexuality and LGBT issues became taboo in Panama. Sodomy was punished with death. The Guna people were able to keep their traditions and customs, despite suppression by the Spanish and the subsequent post-independence Panamanian state.

== Legality of same-sex sexual activity ==
Same-sex sexual activity has been legal in Panama since 2008; Panama was the last Spanish-speaking country in the Americas to overturn its anti-sodomy law. The age of consent is equal at 18. Homosexuality was declassified as a mental illness in 2008.

== Recognition of same-sex relationships ==
Homosexuality laws in Central America and the Caribbean Islands. Same-sex marriage Other type of partnership Unregistered cohabitation No recognition of same-sex couples Constitution limits marriage to opposite-sex couples Same-sex sexual activity illegal but law not enforced

There is no recognition of same-sex couples. A proposal that would have allowed same-sex civil unions was defeated in 2004, mainly due to pressure from the Roman Catholic Church.

On 15 April 2014, in the run-up to the 2014 presidential elections, five of the seven presidential candidates signed a document called the Pact of National Commitment for Life and Traditional Family. The document stated that "the country should guarantee freedom of religion and should modify the law to protect the traditional structure of the family, defined as the union of a man and a woman."

On 8 May 2014, the Code of Private International Law (Spanish: Código de Derecho Internacional Privado) was approved, prohibiting same-sex marriage in Panama and clarifying that the country would not recognize marriages performed in other countries. Article 40 specified that "same-sex marriages are strictly prohibited in the country".

=== 2016–present lawsuit ===
On 17 October 2016, a married same-sex couple filed a lawsuit seeking to recognize same-sex marriages performed abroad in the country. Magistrate Luis Ramón Fabrega was assigned to the case to determine whether to refer the case to the nine-member Supreme Court of Justice. In early November, the case was admitted to the Supreme Court. On 24 March 2017, another lawsuit against Article 26 of the Panamanian Civil Code was introduced to the Supreme Court, who agreed to hear the case. Article 26 specifies that marriage is between a man and a woman and as such bans same-sex marriage. This case seeks to legalize same-sex marriage in Panama. In June 2017, the Supreme Court united the two lawsuits.

On 14 April 2017, Vice President Isabel Saint Malo announced her support for equal marriage rights for same-sex couples. In mid-May, Attorney General Rigoberto González issued a statement to the Supreme Court, asking it to legalise same-sex marriage. While admitting that same-sex marriage was a controversial issue in Panamanian society, González argued that his position was in line with the value of dignity for all human beings as well as the Panamanian Constitution.

In October 2017, one Supreme Court judge preliminarily published a draft ruling rejecting the same-sex marriage case. On 21 December 2017, LGBT advocacy group Fundación Iguales Panama presented a recusal request before the Supreme Court against Justice Cecilio Cedalise, who spoke against same-sex marriage in 2015. The marriage case was put on hold, pending the outcome of the recusal request. On 15 February 2018, the aforementioned draft ruling was withdrawn. The Supreme Court will now take into account the ruling of the Inter-American Court of Human Rights (see below) in its decision. A ruling was expected on 20 December 2018, but was postponed.

In May 2018, it was reported that a lesbian couple had also filed a suit with the Supreme Court in order to have their marriage recognised.

=== 2018 Inter-American Court of Human Rights advisory opinion ===
On 9 January 2018, the Inter-American Court of Human Rights issued an advisory opinion stating that parties to the American Convention on Human Rights should grant same-sex couples access to all existing domestic legal systems of family registration, including marriage, along with all rights that derive from marriage.

On 16 January, Vice President Isabel Saint Malo announced that the country would fully abide by the advisory opinion. Official notices requiring compliance with the opinion were sent out to various governmental departments that same day.

The IACHR announcement was strongly condemned by the Catholic Church and other religious groups. Several deputies similarly expressed their opposition to the statement, with one deputy labelling it "a danger to the human race". In early February, a citizen submitted an application to the Parliament to investigate the Vice President for allegedly overstepping her functions and abusing authority when she announced government compliance with the IACHR opinion.

On 2 February, the Attorney General announced that the country could not ignore the IACHR's announcement, noting that the statement was fully binding on Panama.

After a seven-year delay, the Supreme Court of Justice ruled in March 2023 that there is no positive right to same-sex marriage under the Panamanian constitution or law.

=== 2019 proposed constitutional amendment ===
Under the presidency of the more socially conservative Laurentino Cortizo, a constitutional amendment was approved by the National Assembly on October 29, 2019, to define marriage in the Constitution as between a man and a woman. To come into effect, the amendment would have had been voted on again in 2020 and then submitted to referendum. However, protests against this and other amendments led President Cortizo to criticize the lawmakers, and a committee was established to analyze the more controversial amendments. The amendment was finally withdrawn due to significant public opposition.

== Adoption and parenting ==
Same-sex couples are unable to legally adopt in Panama. However, IVF and artificial insemination are available to lesbian couples in the country.

== Discrimination protections ==
There are no laws protecting LGBT people from discrimination. Article 39 of the Constitution forbids the creation of "companies, associations or foundations" that are contrary to moral or legal order. In the past, this was used to refuse registration of gay organisations.

In August 2015, a bill to ban discrimination on the basis of sexual orientation and gender identity was introduced in the National Assembly. However, the law has not advanced since then.

== Gender identity and expression ==
Since 2006, transgender persons in Panama can change their legal gender and name on their birth certificates, but only after having undergone sex reassignment surgery.

In May 2016, a 22-year-old Panamanian transgender woman was allowed to change her name, so that it matches her gender identity, without having undergone surgery. This was the first time a transgender person in Panama was able to change their name without first undergoing reassignment surgery.

In January 2018, the Inter-American Court of Human Rights ruled that requiring transgender people to undergo surgery to change their legal gender is a violation of the American Convention on Human Rights.

== Blood donation ==
Gay and bisexual men in Panama are banned from donating blood.

== LGBT rights movements in Panama ==
In 1996, Panama's first lesbian and gay organisation Asociación Hombres y Mujeres Nuevos de Panamá (AHMNP; "New Men and Women of Panama Association") was founded. It received legal recognition in 2005 after a three-year battle with the authorities and the Catholic Church. In 2004, they presented a petition calling for partnership rights. In June 2005, Panama's first Gay Pride march was held with 100 AHMNP demonstrators.

In May 2015, the second LGBT rights organisation was formed in Panamá: Unión de la diversidad. In June 2016, a new foundation named Convive Panamá was launched strongly based on the mission, ideas and working methods of Unión de la diversidad. In 2017, Fundación Iguales Panamá, a non-profit organization that promotes the observance, promotion and respect of human rights, was created. The group has impacted public opinion towards tolerance and inclusion for all, and has been in the frontline of defending LGBT rights.

In April 2017, it was announced that First Lady Lorena Castillo would participate in the 2017 Gay Pride parade in Panama City.

== Public opinion ==
According to a Pew Research Center survey, conducted between 13 November and 8 December 2013, 23% of respondents supported same-sex marriage, 72% were opposed.

In May 2015, PlanetRomeo, an LGBT social network, published its first Gay Happiness Index (GHI). Gay men from over 120 countries were asked about how they feel about society's view on homosexuality, how do they experience the way they are treated by other people and how satisfied are they with their lives. Panama was ranked 55th with a GHI score of 44.

According to a public survey conducted in April 2017, 78% of Panamanians opposed same-sex marriage.

The 2017 AmericasBarometer showed that 22% of Panamanians supported same-sex marriage.

== Summary table ==
Same-sex sexual activity legal	Yes (Since 2008)
Equal age of consent (18)	Yes
Anti-discrimination laws in employment	No
Anti-discrimination laws in the provision of goods and services	No
Anti-discrimination laws in all other areas (incl. indirect discrimination, hate speech)	No
Same-sex marriages	No
Recognition of same-sex couples	No
Stepchild adoption by same-sex couples	No
Joint adoption by same-sex couples	No
LGBT people allowed to serve openly in the military	Has no military
Right to change legal gender	Yes (Since 2006)
Access to IVF for lesbians	Yes
Homosexuality declassified as an illness	Yes (Since 2008)
Conversion therapy banned	No
Commercial surrogacy for gay male couples	(Surrogacy takes place and is not prohibited, but there are currently no laws regulating the practice)
MSMs allowed to donate blood	No (Indefinite deferral period)

== See also ==
- LGBTQ rights in the Americas
- Same-sex union court cases
