= La Nación (Costa Rica) =

Daily newspaper published in San Jose, Costa Rica

- The December 11, 2007 front page of La Nación
- Type: Daily newspaper
- Format: Tabloid
- Owner: Grupo Nación S.A.
- Founder: Ricardo Castro Beeche
- Publisher: Yanancy Noguera (Director)
- Founded: 1946
- Language: Spanish
- Headquarters: San José, Costa Rica
- Website: nacion.com

La Nación is a Costa Rican newspaper. It is published in San José, Costa Rica. The newspaper is a general purpose newspaper, and circulates daily all year long, except on three Costa Rican holidays, Good Friday and the following Saturday, and the day after the New Year's Day.

== History ==
La Nación was founded on October 12, 1946, by Sergio Carballo Romero as director, Ricardo Castro Beeche as manager, and Jorge Salas heading the administration. The first reporters were Adrián Vega Aguiar, Salvador Lara, Eduardo Chavarría, Federico González Campos, Claudio Ortiz Oreamuno and Joaquín Vargas Gené. The newspaper was born during the confusion and political unrest caused by lingering electoral fraud, corruption scandals, government repression and street violence against the opposition, with the participation of the Costa Rican communist movement, that at the time was an ally to the Picado administration. Less than two year later after the foundation of La Nación, these events led into the 1948 Costa Rican Civil War.

== La Nación today ==
As of 2008 the newspaper is owned by Grupo Nación, which also owns several newspapers, such as Al Dia, El Financiero, and La Teja, and also the magazines Perfil, Sabores, SoHo, and Su Casa. Grupo Nación also owns other related companies, such as Servigráficos, Impresión Comercial, and PAYCA. The group also owns several radio stations of the Grupo Latinoamericano de Radiodifusión, in alliance with the Spaniard Grupo Prisa, operating three radio stations: La Nueva 90.7, Los 40 Principales, and Bésame. Overseas the Grupo Nación owns three important newspapers. The Panamanian] weekly El Capital, and Siglo XXI and Al Día in Guatemala.

On May 2, 2026, the US revoked the visas of five members of La Nación's board of directors. According to the board's statement this was done without explanation or prior notice. In an editorial the paper asserted the revocations were meant as punishment for its editorial stance in opposition to the Costa Rican government, which had been cooperating with the US on migration and other matters. The board stated that "under no circumstance will these actions change the commitment to or the independent exercise of the journalism that has characterized La Nación during 79 years." Citing privacy regulations, the US State Department declined to comment on the revocations. According to a Congressional Research Service report, the US had previously revoked visas of Costa Rican legislative and judicial officials and former president Oscar Arias over "unspecified ties to China."

== See also ==
- List of newspapers in Costa Rica
