= Antisemitism in Costa Rica =

Antisemitism in Costa Rica refers to the anti-Jewish sentiment and prejudice in the Republic of Costa Rica.

== History ==
=== Colonial period ===
The first Jews arriving to Costa Rica were mostly Sephardic Jews from Spain escaping persecution. Most of them New Christians. Although some may have been crypto-Jewish it is impossible to know how many were Roman Catholics and how many were not.

As part of the Spanish Empire the Spanish Inquisition was in place in the province of Costa Rica, however there's no registry of any Jew ever to have been trialed or executed, as the only registry of an Inquisition trial in Costa Rica was against a couple of young women accused of Witchcraft who were absolved.

=== Independence ===
After gaining independence the first Costa Rican Constitution, the Pact of Concord of 1821 established the Catholic religion as the mandatory religion (not only official but compulsory) banning all other creeds for the citizens of Costa Rica and only allowing the practice of other religions for foreigners who were temporary in the country. This, of course, affected the Jews already living in the country who had to practice their religion in secret, inspiring the myth of the "witches of Escazú". Escazú had one of the largest Jewish communities and the Jewish rites (using black clothes and speaking in "strange languages" [Hebrew] among other things made some observers to think that it was some sort of magical ritual). However freedom of religion was established in the following Constitution, 1825's Fundamental Law of the State of Costa Rica as in the Federal Republic of Central America in general of which the State of Costa Rica was a member, allowing Jews to practice freely.

=== First Republic ===
Successive migration from Sephardic Jews from places like Curacao, Panama and Jamaica faced relative tranquility, though Jews did not have their own graveyard and Sephardic Jews were buried (alongside Protestants, Muslims, Baháʼís and other minorities) in the Foreigners' Cemetery, a practice that continues to this date. After the foundation of Freemasonry in Costa Rica anti-Masonic publications mostly from the Church also associated Masonry with Judaism, as did the publication of the anti-Masonic Catholic party, the Catholic Union in 1891 accusing it of being the "flesh and bones of Talmudism".

The first major waves of Jewish migrations came in the late 19th century and early 20th century mainly from Ashkenazi Polish Jews who did not mix with the Sephardic.

These migratory waves escaping the European antisemitism and the rise of Nazism were controversial in the Costa Rican society and caused heated debates in the press, producing also a large number of antisemitic articles and the births of far-right antisemitic groups like the Patriotic Union and the Anti-Jewish Committee. Antisemitic laws were enacted during President León Cortés Castro's administration. Cortés was a well known anti-Semite and Fascist sympathizer. Future president Otilio Ulate also spread antisemitic canards in his own newspaper even accusing Jews of poisoning the milk of children and was a prominent antisemite.

=== World War II ===
During the interwar period the NSDAP/AO tried the nazification of the Costa Rican German community, which was led by engineer Max Effinger, who would be a minister in Cortes' cabinet. The issue split the German community among pro and anti-Nazis.

Cortes' successor, Dr. Rafael Ángel Calderón Guardia, has also being accused of anti-Semitic and anti-Masonic ideas, however Calderón was closer to Spanish National Catholicism than any form of Fascism and was loyal to the United States even visiting the White House during his tenure. After the Pearl Harbor attack Calderón declared war on Germany and aligned the country with the Allies following a persecution of Germans, Italians and Japanese (including Effinger who was deported to the United States although release after the war). However most laws limiting the rights of Jews were kept in place until Calderón successor's presidency, Teodoro Picado Michalski, himself son of a Polish mother and thus friendly toward the Polish Jewish community.

The outbreak of the Costa Rican Civil War after the 1948 election in which Otilio Ulate was the alleged winner split the country in two sides; opponents and supporters of the government. The Jewish community was seen as pro-government whilst Germans and Italians were overwhelmingly anti-Calderón due to the persecutions. After the triumph of rebel forces the Synagogue of San José was set on fire, but no more anti-Semitic attacks happened in part due to the opposition of war caudillo José Figueres.

=== Second Republic ===
Most of post–1948 period of Costa Rica was characterized by its political stability. The country developed a two-party system between the center-left Figueristas and center-right Calderonistas and in general avoided the extremes with both far-left and far-right parties receiving testimonial results. Costa Rica (as a founding member of the United Nations) was also one of the countries that voted in favor of the creation of Israel and for many years was alongside El Salvador one of the only two countries with the embassy in Jerusalem and not Tel Aviv. During the Cold War period the far-right Free Costa Rica Movement was born and active, with a strong paramilitary anti-leftist organization. Although some members of the group were openly anti-Zionist others were simply Conservative and Libertarian hardliners whose anti-Communism was not mixed with anti-Jewish ideas.

Controversies regarding Luis Fishman's Jewishness arise during the 2002 Costa Rican general election when presidential candidate Abel Pacheco de la Espriella separated Fishman as his running mate in the presidential ticket. Fishman accused Pacheco and his team of making anti-Semitic comments. On the 2010–2014 period, then deputy Manrique Oviedo of the Citizens' Action Party (although he later defected to National Restoration) accused then Vice President Luis Liberman of using his influence for benefiting a fellow Jew.

And in 2019 anti-establishment right-wing candidate Juan Diego Castro generated uproar due to his video making accusation against businessman and newspaper owner Leonel Baruch, of Jewish origin, calling him "evil banker" and mocking the Holocaust. Anti-semitic comments have been reported in social media including against Eliécer Feinzaig, president of the Liberal Progressive Party and of Jewish religion.

=== 21st century and rise of Neo-nazism ===
Around the early 2000s the so call National Socialist Party of Costa Rica was founded, mainly as a fringe neo-Nazi group, accused of minor violent hate crimes and vandalism, but with little to non impact in Costa Rican politics aside from the media coverage. Some other minor neo-Nazi groups also appeared with mostly online activity. In 2012 a police officer identify as Ronald "Murdock" Herrera Borges came into the spotlight for his association with Nazism and being openly neo-Nazi. Herrera was fired from the police and committed suicide a few years later. In 2015 the Simon Wiesenthal Center denounced that shops selling Holocaust denial literature and Nazi symbols existed in San José.

In 2018 an anti-immigration rally was controversial due to the presence of neo-Nazis in it using Swastikas and Nazi salutes and administrating far-right Facebook pages that spread xenophobic material and Fake news. Several far-right organization were dismantled during the 2019 including a terrorist group that owned one of these pages named Resistencia Costarricense (Costa Rican Resistance).

== Data and analysis ==
A 2009 poll measuring the perception of Jews in Costa Rica showed that 32% of Costa Rican have a positive view of the Jews, whilst 29% have a negative and 38% have neither. 8% of Costa Rican considered Jews to be honest citizens, 10% considered that they help each other, 4.7% considered that they help the economy, 4.5% believed they respect the family and 4.8% that they have a clear identity. 7.5% of Costa Ricans believed that Jews discriminate non-Jews, 6.5% believed they exploit who works for them, 11% that they know how to handle money and 4% believed they disrespect the Christian faith. Negative ideas were more prominent among men than women.

Only 1.3% expressed they distrusted Jews (the most distrusted group was that of the Colombian immigrants at 34%), and only 0.5% expressed that they have a problem with Judaism as a religion (65% expressed no problem with any religion), 67% expressed no problem with Jewish institutions, 13% express a little of discomfort and only 7% expressed a lot of discomfort. 37% thought that Jews should be more loyal to Costa Rica than to Israel, and 35% were indifferent if they were. 41% of Ticos answered that they think the Jews killed Christ or took part in his death, whilst 37% do not answer and 21% think the Jews were not responsible.
