= Freemasonry in Costa Rica =

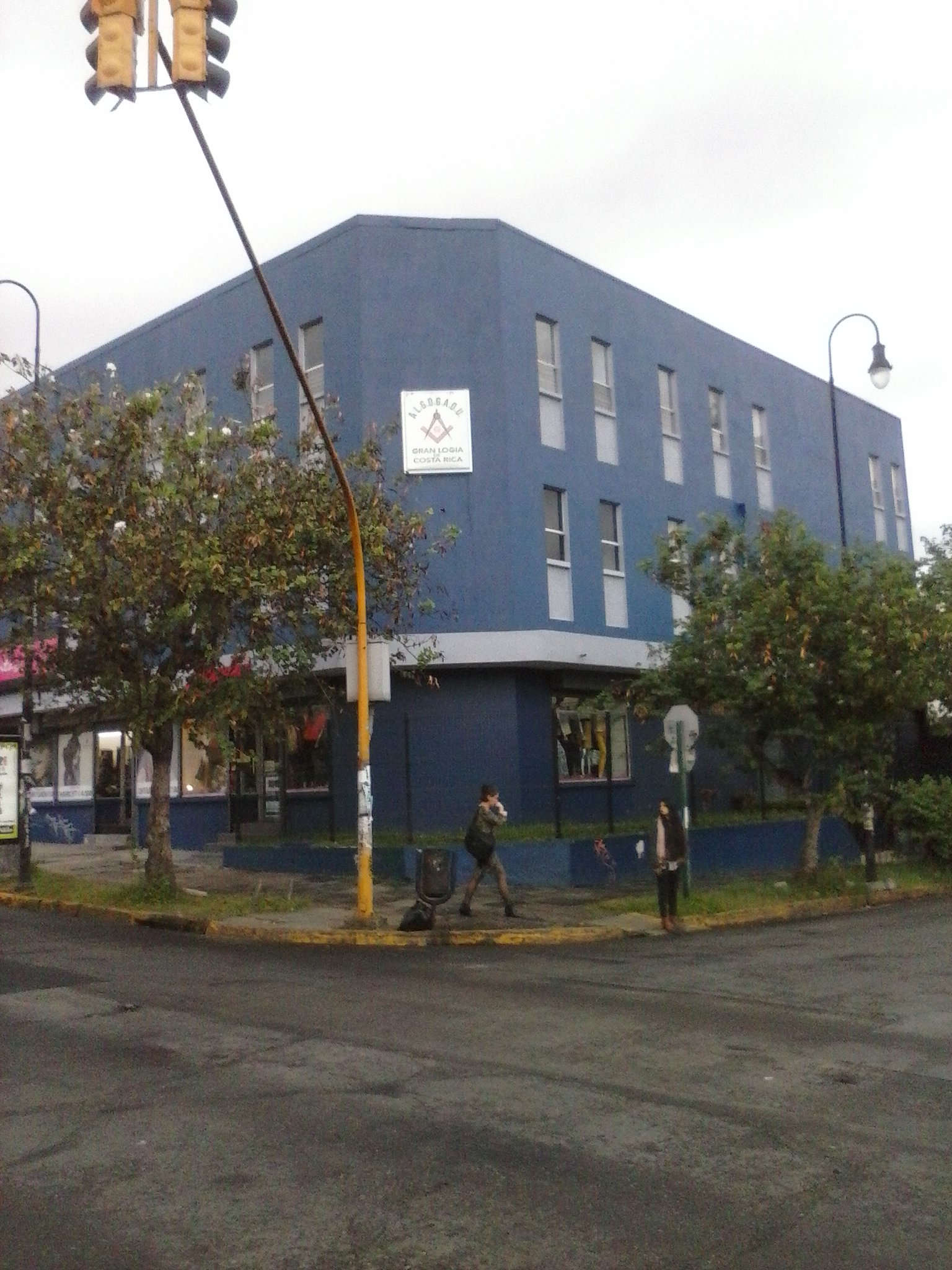
See of the Grand Lodge of Costa Rica

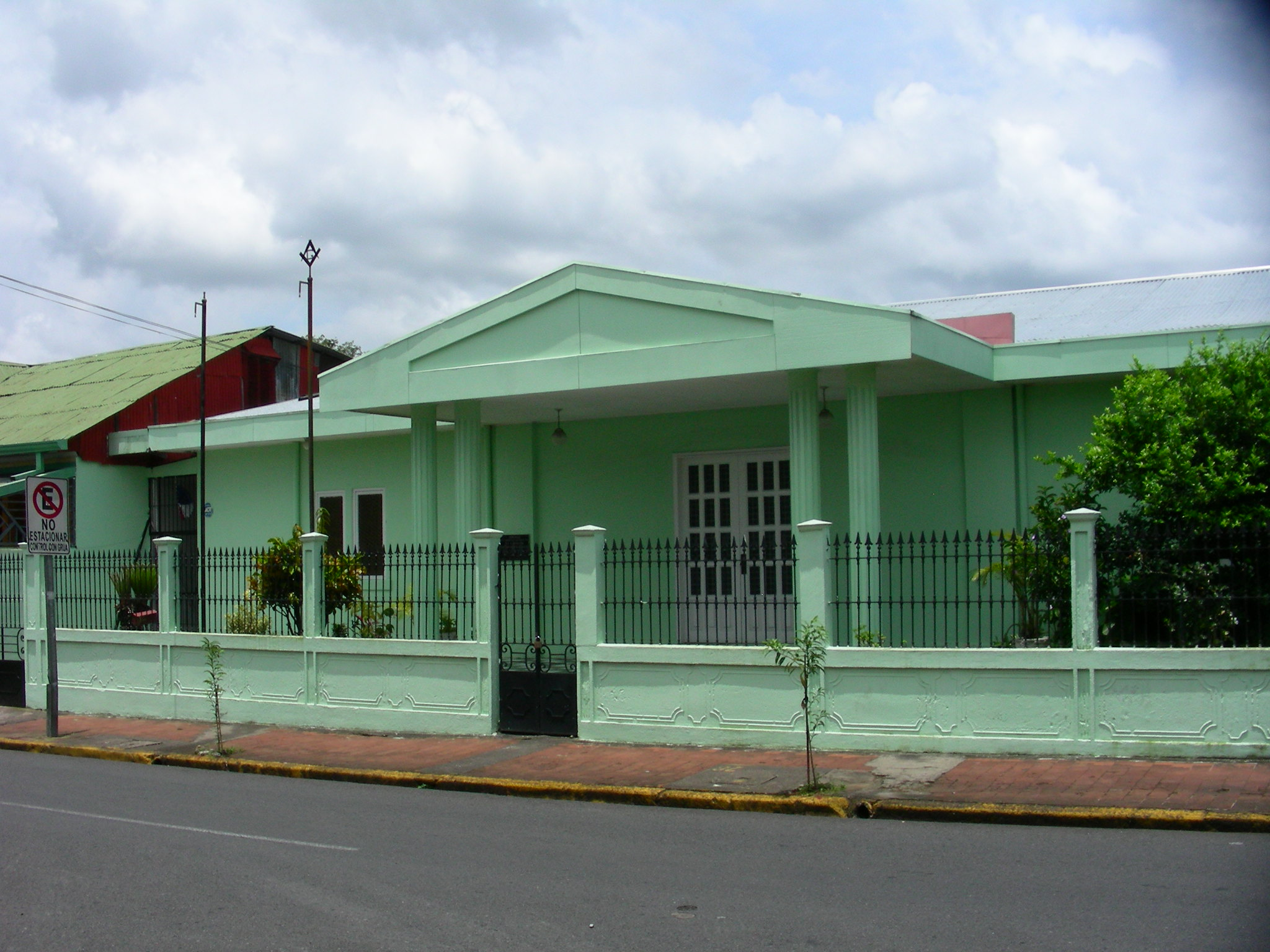
Alajuelan Masonic Temple

Freemasonry began in Costa Rica at the same time as in Central America, during the course of the 19th century. Regular masonry was established by Costa Rican Catholic priest Francisco Calvo, ex-Chaplain General of the Army of Costa Rica during the Filibuster War of 1856, who introduced regular masonry to Central America in 1865. However, there is evidence of the existence of "non-regular" Lodges active both before and after Costa Rican Independence. Many prominent Costa Rican figures of politics, literature, art and science, including several presidents of the Republic, were Freemasons.

== History ==
According to historian Rafael Obregón Loría (who was also Grand Master of the Grand Lodge of Costa Rica), several lodges were founded in the country before 1865, and there is some legal evidence for this A citizen of the surname Bolio appeared to have been judicially indicted for heresy because he was a Mason,, onfessed repentance,aand gave up the ame of a Venerable Master in office, a foreigner who traveled throughout Central America and had the surname Echarri.

Calvo was initiated into regular Freemasonry while in Peru and later returned to Costa Rica. The first regular Masonic Lodge of which there is record was the Respectful Lodge Charity of Costa Rica, which was declared by the Grand Administrative Council of the Grand Orient, that issued the respective letter patent, to be established on June 28, 1865.

In 1867, the Fraternal Union Lodge was formed. Dependent on the Grand Lodge of Columbus in Cuba, it split from Charity Lodge for unknown disagreements. Bruno Carranza was its venerable master. The Grand Lodge of Columbus had been recognized by the Masonic Lodge of South Carolina in 1859, and was separate from GOCA, established in 1862, since the former was nationalist and pro-independence in nature.

On January 9, 1871, the 33rd and last Supreme Council of the Ancient and Accepted Scottish Rite of Central America was founded, with its headquarters in San Jose, Costa Rica. From Costa Rica, Freemasonry would be promoted to the rest of Central America and linked to the liberal revolutions of the 1870s (such as in Costa Rica, Guatemala and El Salvador), and regular lodges created, especially Nicaragua and Guatemala.

By 1875, there were multiple lodges in the country, including Charity No. 1, Hope No. 2, Faith No. 3, Fraternal Union No. 7, Progress No. 9, Wonder No. 12, Sincere Friendship No. 18, Disillution No. 14, Concord and the Future, Regeneration No. 6, Fraternal Union Nº9, La Luz Nº 12, La Libertad Nº 15 and Phoenix. On December 7, 1879, these lodges united to form the Grand Lodge of Costa Rica. Most lodges, at this time, used the Ancient and Accepted Scottish Rite (only two used the York Rite) and thus were exclusively male lodges. The requirements to be a Mason at this time were; being over 21 years of age, knowing how to read and write (something quite common, since Costa Rica had high levels of literacy) and being a person of good manners. Most Freemasons at the beginning of the 19th century belonged to the bourgeoisie or the small bourgeoisie. Between 1865-1899, its numbers amounted to 649. Freemasonry spread ideas of humanism, rationalism and the French Enlightenment that quickly, became popular among the intellectuals and ruling classes at the time. In fact, the House of Teaching of Santo Tomás, founded by the freemason José María Castro Madriz and whose two first rectors, Manuel Argüello Mora (nephew and foster child of the hero and Benemérito Juan Rafael Mora Porras) and Lorenzo Montúfar (liberal exiled from Guatemala), were also Masters Masons, taught the Chair of Rationalism in the Faculty of Philosophy. During the presidency of Castro, Freemasonry would carry out important general education reform, including public education funded by the State, primary education for both sexes and academic freedom.

This promotion of liberal ideas, that included freedom of expression, of conscience and the free debate of ideas, promoted during the government of Castro Madriz, began to alarm the Catholic Church. As such, the first Bishop of Costa Rica Monsignor Anselmo Llorente y la Fuente was compelled to issue several condemnations of Freemasonry, based on the respective papal encyclicals, and reaffirm the need for the Church to guide the consciences of the people to avoid Godlessness.

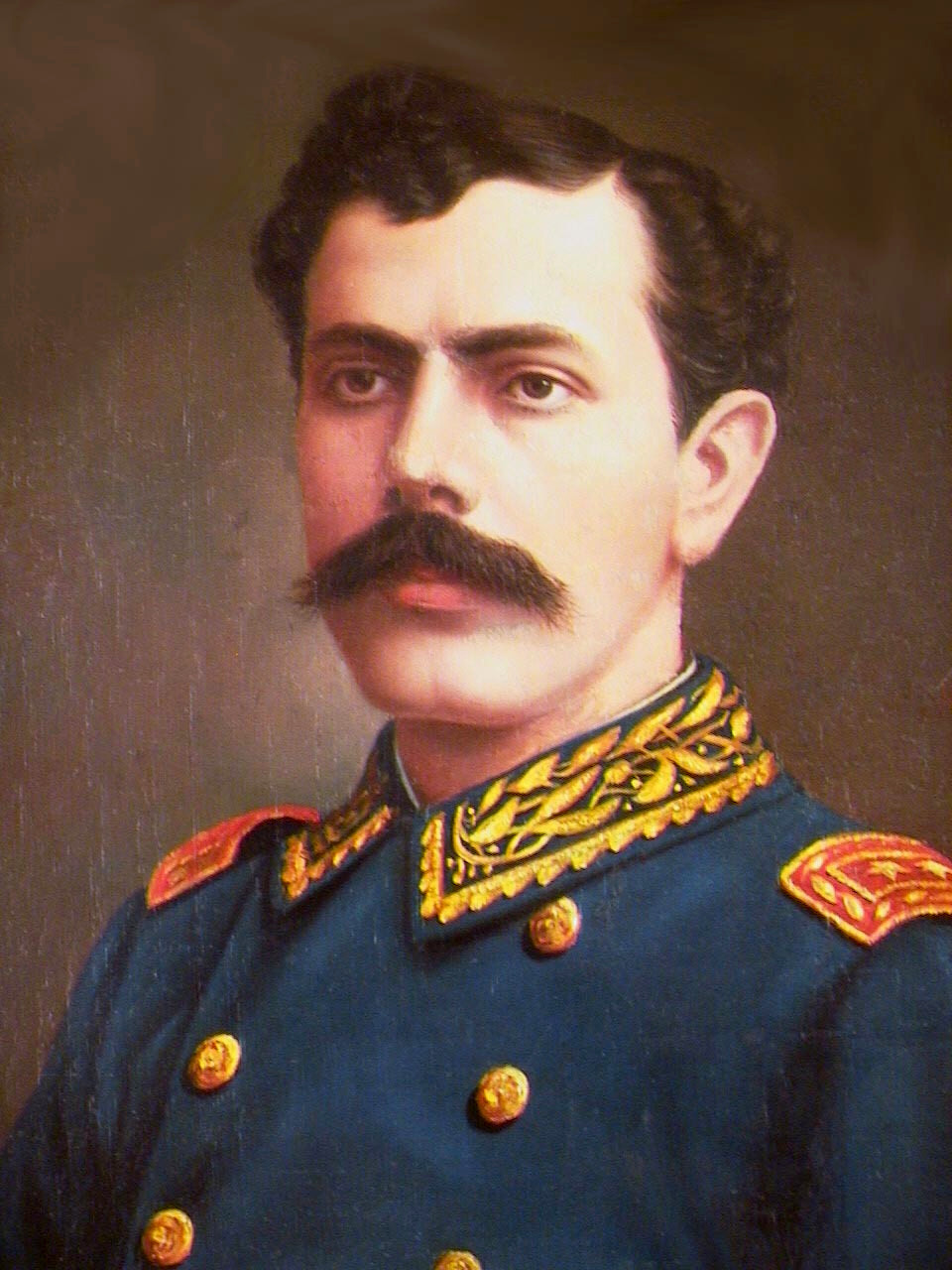
Bernardo Soto Alfaro president of Costa Rica, liberal and mason, proclaimed «Grand Protector of the Masonic Order in Costa Rica».

The different lodges were also involved in different political factions. Thus, while the Charity Lodge included the great majority of Castro Madriz's ministers, after the schism and the emergence of the Fraternal Union, the opposition to Castro Madriz consisted largely of members of the Union of whom supported his ousting. During the de facto government of Jesús Jiménez Zamora, which toppled Castro Madriz on November 1, 1868, anti-Masonic arguments were used to justify the coup: for example, that Freemasons intended to destroy the Cathedral and ban Catholicism. Jiménez persecuted Freemasonry and, during his brief mandate, its activities would be prohibited. However, he did not repeal Castro's reforms: for example, his educational reform was maintained and even included in the Constitution.

Jiménez Zamora would be overthrown about a year after his coming to power, and most of the leaders of the coup were Masons. Tomás Guardia took power and established a Constituent Assembly that drafted the Constitution of 1871. Among its members were Masons Manuel Aragon, Aniceto Esquivel, Luis Diego Sáenz, Cipriano Muñoz, Andrés Sáenz, Alejandro Alvarado García (of the Charity Lodge) and Bernardino Alvarado (of the Pacific Flower Lodge). In general, during the controversial authoritarian government of Guardia, there would be countless political struggles between liberal and Masonic factions. Just as in Guatemala, there were different liberal and secular factions, some more militant and anti-clerical (led by the Mason, General Justo Rufino Barrios), and others more civil and democratic (like that of the Mason Lorenzo Montúfar, exiled in Costa Rica). After the death of Guardia, his close associate Saturnino Lizano (also a Mason) took over for a couple of months. Próspero Fernández, a liberal soldier, of the Union Fraternal Lodge, was then elected to the presidency by electoral route and assumed it on August 10, 1882. With his government, the bitter intra-Masonic struggles seemed to end, and a decided boost was given to their liberal and secular ideas and principles. Fernández continued the liberal work he began as a young rebel student, followed by his son-in-law, Bernardo Soto. The controversy about the liberal project was not long in coming, driven by the popular German-born Archbishop Monsignor Bernardo Augusto Thiel.

From 1865 to 1870, 28 out of 31 deputies, 9 out of the 10 judges of the Supreme Court of Justice, 15 out of 16 ministers and 5 out of 6 presidents were Masons.

The number of Freemasons in public office is decreasing with time: for example, from 1864 to 1866, only 4 of 22 deputies would be Freemasons (18%). Between 1864 and 1900 the number of Freemasons in the Parliament would range between 14% (1866-1868 and 1872-1874) to 34% (1884-1886). These percentages seem to disprove the accusations made by Catholic publications of the time, such as Eco Católico, which affirmed that 90% of the deputies were Freemasons.

However, they were more established in the executive power branch: from 1865 to 1906, presidents José María Castro Madriz, Bruno Carranza, Tomás Guardia (although he would retire later), José Antonio Pinto Castro, Salvador Lara Zamora, Próspero Fernández Oreamuno, Bernardo Soto Alfaro and Ascensión Esquivel Ibarra were all Freemasons. During their governments, their cabinets would be made up of a number of Freemasons, ranging between 58% (in Esquivel's administration) to 86% (in Guardia's). The situation changed in 1899, under the consecutive conservative governments of José Joaquín Rodríguez Zeledón (1890-1894) and his son-in-law Rafael Yglesias (1894-1902), where there seemed to be no Masonic influence.

Between 1865 and 1899, a series of republican and secularizing political reforms began in Costa Rica that promoted liberal ideas embraced by the higher social classes of the time. Many of these liberal reforms that would shape the country were promoted by followers of Costa Rican Freemasonry.

Due to this, throughout the 20 century, Freemasonry was associated with liberalism and they two would be seen as consubstantial with one another. Of this, the archbishop of San José, Monsignor Víctor Manuel Sanabria Martínez, said:

Freemasonry was among us the organized group of the liberalería [sic], was the instrument of expression of liberalism, freemasonry was trumpet of liberalism, and also political body, Freemasonry is a purely capitalist instrument.

However, throughout the nineteenth century, relations between the Church and Masonry were always complex. The Costa Rican Freemasons were not anticlerical, and in fact there is evidence that there were both Catholic and Protestant priests that belonged to the Masons and had good relations with the liberal clergy. However, it came into conflict with the local Catholic hierarchy, led by Bishop Bernardo Augusto Thiel, who was an opponent of the liberal government, for which he was expelled from the country (along with the Jesuits) during the administration of Próspero Fernández and his newspaper, Eco Católico, closed. The expulsion of Thiel caused in turn the temporary suspension of Calvo from his position as priest, as Calvo was considered co-conspirator with the government and guilty of introducing Freemasonry to Costa Rica, although Calvo himself had been retired from Masonic activities for nine years.

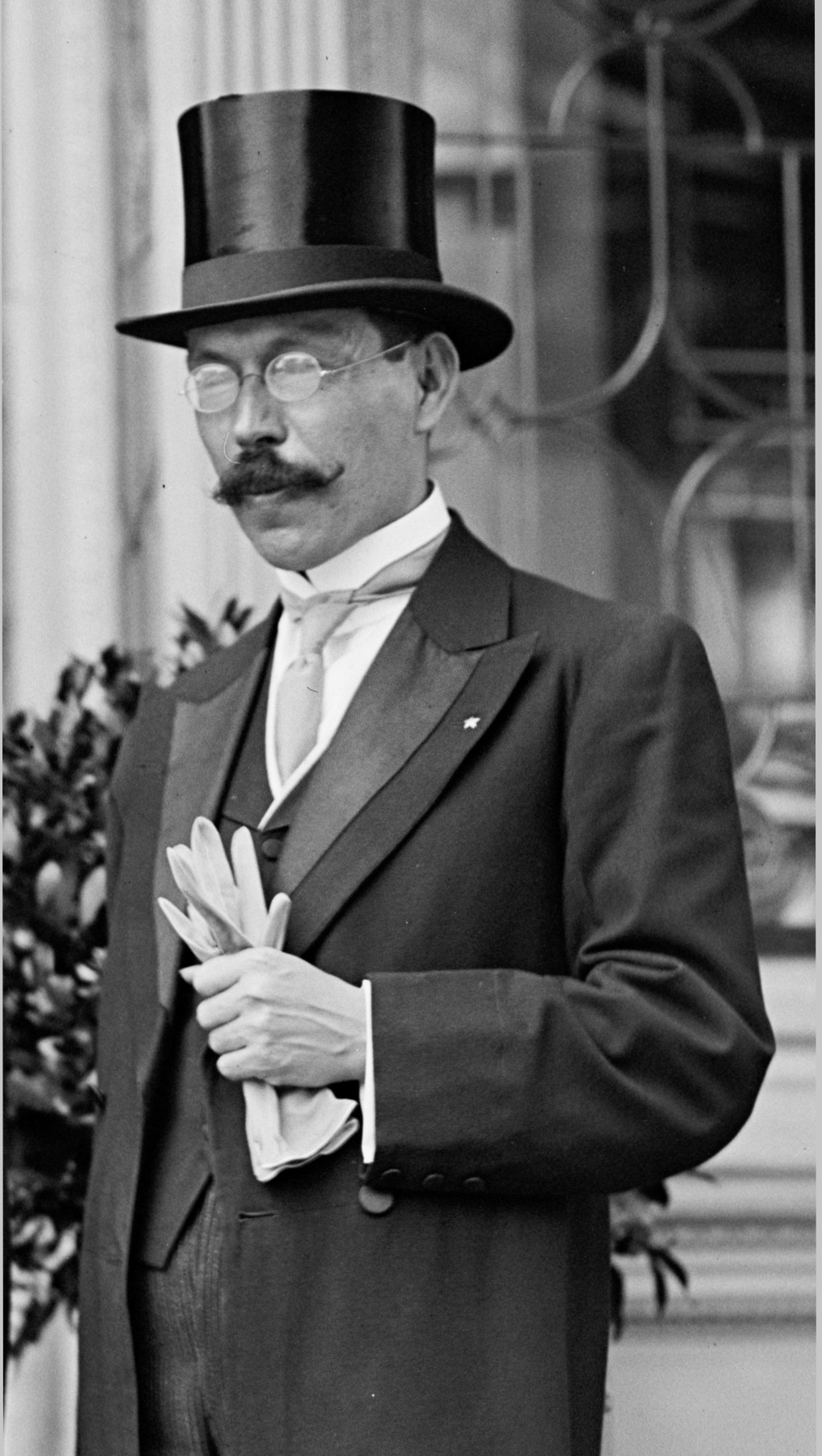
Roberto Brenes Mesén, writer and poet, known Mason and Theosophist.

After the death of Fernandez, his son-in-law, Bernardo Soto, nicknamed "Great Protector of the Masonic Order", came to power. Soto, through the intercession of Calvo, allowed the return of Thiel, who seemed to start making peace with Freemasonry. Within Soto's government, Freemasons made up a large number.

In 1889, the conservative Catholic and anti-Masonic Catholic Union Party arose, which began a fierce anti-Masonic campaign, associating the organization with Satanism and describing it as an anti-Christian cult. Catholic newspapers of the time also sought to associate Freemasonry with other hostile currents of thought to the Church. Thus, Eco Catolico associated it with atheism and materialism, while the Catholic leadership linked it with Protestantism and affirmed that both had the same origin and the same goal: the destruction of the Church.As in other nations, the association of Freemasonry with Judaism was not be absent. According to Ricardo Martinez, the official newspaper of the Catholic Union Party wrote:

... it has been organized and receives its entire address from the Jews, at least in its highest and most secret part. Freemasonry, as a writer says, is the flesh and bone of Talmudism

— (La Unión Católica, 22 February 1891)

In the 1889 election, the first in which political parties took part, Freemasons Bernardo Soto and Ascensión Esquivel formed the historical Liberal Progressive Party that faced the conservative Democratic Constitutional Party, which put forth José Joaquín Rodríguez Zeledón, who had support from the Church. The progressive liberals were defeated, and the Constitutional Party, whose only function was to prevent the triumph of Esquivel, was dissolved. In the subsequent elections of 1894, Rodriguez had already broken his clerical ties and promoted the candidacy of his son-in-law Rafael Yglesias, who was facing the newly founded Catholic Union that nominated José Gregorio Trejos Gutiérrez and faced all kinds of obstacles from the government, including the arrest of their candidate. By this time, the Independent Democratic Party of the Freemason Felix Arcadio Montero Monge had been founded.

Yglesias and Esquivel founded the National Union Party for the 1902 election, which was dubbed by the Catholic Union as the "Masonic Party", despite the fact that Esquivel had already left Masonry by this time and there is no formal record that Yglesias ever was a Mason.

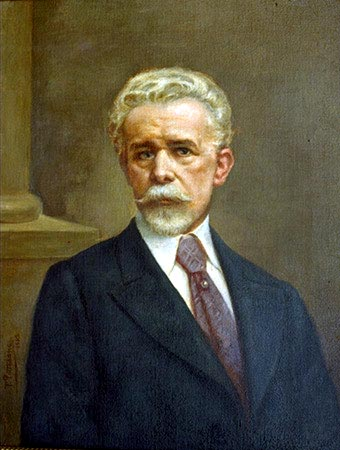
Tomás Povedano, Spanish-born Costa Rican painter and Freemason.

Costa Rican Freemasonry would have an important part in the founding of the Theosophical Society in Costa Rica in 1904. Several of its founders, such as the writer Roberto Brenes Mesén and the famous painter Tomás Povedano, were also Master Masons. The Theosophical Society would play a very important influence in the Costa Rican culture in areas such as education, art and politics, due to its many members in important positions of government and the popularization of Theosophy among the Costa Rican aristocracy. This led it to have some cultural clashes with the Catholic Church, especially on certain topics such as artistic representations or complex controversies. For example, Brenes Mesén, director of the Liceo de Heredia, authorized the teaching of evolution and did not allow the teaching of the Catholic religion, two situations that generated angry polemics from the Church.

José Basileo Acuña Zeledón founded the first Mixed Masonic Lodge in 1919, called the Lodge Saint Germain No 621, originally belonging to Le Droit Humain based in Paris, France. However, since 2002, most mixed lodges adhere to the Eastern Order of International Co-Freemasonry based in Adhyar, India.

Lebanese and Syrian immigration would have an important role in Costa Rican Freemasonry. Many of these immigrants would join Masonic lodges and two would become Grand Masters: the Lebanese businessman Bejos Yamuni Abdalá, who held the post of Venerable Master of the Grand Lodge between 1949 and 1950, and his son, Yamuni, who emigrated to the country in 1901, along with his parents and brothers, who were prospering as merchants. His family was Maronite Christian and Yamuni, who acquired Costa Rican citizenship in 1912 married the Costa Rica-born, of Syrian descent, Mercedes Tabush in 1914. Yamuni entered Freemasonry on July 5, 1905, in the Regeneration Lodge of San Jose, then moved to the Freedom Lodge of San José in 1910, the Hermes Lodge of San José in 1927 and the Wonder Lodge of Alajuela in 1940. In 1943, he would built his own Masonic Temple, under the aegis of Yamuni, who was Venerable Master. All the previous lodges were based on the Scottish Rite. In 1950, Yamuni entered the Lodge The Light of Anglo-Saxon Protestants and English-speaking, who used the York Rite. Both Bejos and his son were part of the Philosophical Chambers, being elected Grand Treasurer, Lieutenant and Grand Master.

== See also ==
- Freemasonry in Latin America
