= Free Costa Rica Movement =

- Leader: Bernal Urbina
- Founded: 1961
- Country: Costa Rica
- Ideology: Radical anti-communism Costa Rican nationalism Ultraconservatism
- Political position: Far-right

The Free Costa Rica Movement (Movimiento Costa Rica Libre) was a far-right anti-Communist and ultra-Conservative political association in Costa Rica. The group was founded in 1961 as Nationalist Movement (Movimiento Nacionalista). Some of its more noticeable actions were during neighboring Nicaragua's Sandinista government in the 80s, as the group was strongly anti-Sandinista and considered Sandinista Nicaragua a threat to Costa Rica. The group attacked Nicaragua's embassy in 1981. Besides the FSLN, the group was also enemy of several Costa Rican left-wing parties like United People and several farmers and workers organizations. It was also a member of the World Anti-Communist League.

== History ==
The movement was founded in 1961 by Edgar Cardona, who led a failed coup against José Figueres Ferrer, Rodolfo Robles, Hernán Robles, Bernal Urbina, the Pozuelo (of the Pozuelo cookie chain), the Uribes (linked to the Más X Menos chain) and the Federspiels (of the Universal store chain) with the purpose of combating communism.

The Free Costa Rica Movement was a member of the World Anticommunist League, founded in Taiwan by Chiang Kai-shek, to which various organizations belong anti-communists). Additionally, the MCRL had greater influence and means than its activities ultimately demonstrated. For example, the press on several occasions denounced that his fight against the Sandinistas, who President Rodrigo Carazo Odio allowed to operate in the northern zone, and the Cubans, which helped him to form in 1983 the Huetar Norte Democratic Association, a paramilitary organization that provided all kinds of support to the Nicaraguan Contras and its counterpart, the North Chorotega Democratic Association, which operated fighting the Sandinistas on the northern border and preventing Nicaraguan immigrants from entering, and was responsible for creating training camps for Cuban counterrevolutionaries. These organizations were joined by Patria y Libertad, the group responsible for having blown up the tower that transferred electricity from Costa Rica to Nicaragua (1985).

Between 1982 and 1984, the MCRL operated several paramilitary units, among which the Blue Berets and the Tridents stood out, which operated in the Metropolitan Area and whose members generally belonged to the middle class. Additionally, there were very clear indications of economic ties between the MCRL and the United States embassy. Peasant movements in the northern zone, Guanacaste or the San Carlos plain are also suspected of being repressed by the Costa Rican government with the support of groups related to the MCRL.

The Unión Patriótica was formed in 1961 in response to the alleged threat of left-wing insurgent actions against Costa Rican democratic institutions led by the well-known anti-communist Frank Marshall. In this process, it also served the training of Cuban counter-revolutionaries in the facilities of its founder, Costa Rican Ludwig Starke Maroto, who is also a renowned veterinarian in the country.

However, the Free Costa Rica Movement remained the most active of these nationalist and anti-communist groups. Several media outlets at the time denounced that the MCRL received large sums of money from companies and the governments of United States and Taiwan, with paramilitary training, however, close associates of the Movement took charge of diverting the attention and impede investigations. From 1980 it reached its peak, due to the political tension that affected all Central America at that time.

Another of the actions taken by this movement consisted of infiltrating the Costa Rican Taxi Drivers Association to such an extent that its leader, a member of the MCRL, helped to dissolve a peaceful demonstration through this Association. It is rumored that it was due to information delivered from the US Embassy in San José.

The organization is alleged to have had heavily trained paramilitary squads of anti-communist fighters in addition to the Blue Berets and the Tridents in the period 1982 to 1984.

However, after the death of Bernal Urbina Pinto, he fell into a strong inactivity for several years. In 2005, a representative of the MCRL declared himself in favor of CAFTA through a press release. On March 29, 2009, in a statement signed by Jose Alberto Pinto in La Nación, the Costa Rica-Cuba relations, by the Arias Sánchez administration.

The reason for this inactivity may be due to the fact that in 1984 the members of its main civilian squad, the Blue Berets, resigned from the MCRL because they found that it did not meet the necessary requirements for an effective confrontation against the communist expansion in Central America, thus depriving it of its main branch and an important group of members. In 1985, the Blue Berets dissolve of their own volition.

The organization declared itself prepared to defend Costa Rica from the Nicaraguan invasion of Isla Calero during the Costa Rica–Nicaragua San Juan River border dispute with no more public activities known ever since.
