= WCCR =

WCCR may refer to:

- WCCR (AM), a radio station (1260 AM) licensed to Cleveland, Ohio, United States
- WCCR-FM, a radio station (92.7 FM) licensed to Clarion, Pennsylvania, United States
- WCCR-LP, a low-powered radio station (94.5 FM) licensed to Williamsburg, Kentucky, United States

== See also ==
- Women's Club of Costa Rica (WCCR)
