= Revolutionary Civic Union =

Revolutionary Civic Union Unión Cívica Revolucionaria
- President: Frank Marshall Jiménez
- Founded: 1955
- Registered: 17 January 1957
- Dissolved: 22 September 1968
- Ideology: Radical anti-communism Costa Rican nationalism Neo-fascism
- Political position: Far-right
- Colours: Green, white and black

The Revolutionary Civic Union was the name of an armed paramilitary group and later far-right pro-fascist Costa Rican political party. The party was led by politician Frank Marshall Jiménez, denoted anti-communist and anti-Calderonista, who became a member of the Legislative Assembly.

== History ==
Marshall was the son of an American mining businessman who died at the hands of Sandinista guerrillas in Nicaragua. His stepfather, Ricardo Steinvorth, of German origin, sent him to live in Germany where he was educated in the 1930s during the times of the Third Reich and even belonged to the Hitler Youth, but returned to Costa Rica after the Second World War sparked. The Calderón Guardia government declared war on Germany and brought all Costa Rican citizens and residents of German, Italian and Japanese origin into a concentration camp located in front of the Mercado Central on Avenida San Martín, San José, and their properties were confiscated. His stepfather was deported to the United States, although he would later be released. Marshall would become a bitter opponent of the government of Calderón Guardia and his communist allies, for which he fought alongside rebel caudillo José Figueres and other opposition figures against the "Caldero-communists" during the war of 48. The rebel faction won and Calderón alongside other defeated political leaders including the Secretary General of the Costa Rican Communist Party Manuel Mora Valverde escaped to exile. Later in 1955 a Nicaraguan-endorsed invasion attempt by Calderonista forces was also repelled and Marshall help the then constitutional government of Figueres with its Revolutionary Civic Union forces.

Later on January 17, 1957, the group would turn into a political party recognized by the Tribunal Supremo de Elecciones de Costa Rica, and would gain seats on two elections; the 1958 Costa Rican general election and the 1966 Costa Rican general election. In the 1962 Costa Rican general election the party did not run to avoid dividing the anti-Calderonista vote as Rafael Ángel Calderón Guardia (who had returned earlier to the country after receiving a general amnesty thanks to President Mario Echandi) was running for president. It dissolved on 22 September 1968.
