= Costa Rican nationalism =

Nationalist vision of the cultural and national identity of Costa Rica

Costa Rican nationalism is the nationalist vision of the cultural and national identity of Costa Rica. According to scholars such as Tatiana Lobo, Carmen Murillo and Giovanna Giglioli, Costa Rican nationalism is based on two main myths; rural democracy since colonial times and the racial (white) "purity" of the Central Valley as the cradle of Costa Rican society.

== Analysis ==
The myth of rural democracy revolves around the idea that Costa Rica has always been democratic: that since colonial times, Costa Ricans have enjoyed a society where all from the governor to peasants have had a voice and vote in decisions. This depiction of a perfectly egalitarian society has been questioned by academics such as Iván Molina, who challenge the image of a colonial and post-colonial, democratic and horizontal Costa Rica, arguing that in fact there existed a powerful, liberal, coffee-growing bourgeoisie that controlled the country. Nevertheless, it is generally accepted that unlike many of its neighbors, the social hierarchy in Costa Rica was never so marked, especially in the absence of an aristocracy with noble titles imported from Spain as in other Latin American nations, and the configuration of land ownership prevented the emergence of large latifundia. Furthermore, social reforms beginning in the forties permitted a degree of social mobility, such that today it is common for working and middle class people to rise to public office as deputies and have on occasion risen to the office of president, even as a privileged political-business class persists.

The racial myth is based on the idea that Costa Ricans in general are ethnically whiter than their Central American neighbors. This myth is deeply rooted in Costa Rican ideology and has been consciously or unconsciously used throughout history as a form of exclusion from the ethnically diverse populations, immigrants and peripheral provinces supposedly more mestizas. Again, recent studies seem to be refuting this myth. Although indeed miscegenation in Costa Rica could be less than in other countries due to the almost absence of indigenous peoples in its territory, recent genetic studies show that the majority of Costa Ricans have European, indigenous and African ancestry to some extent and that miscegenation it is similar to other Latin American countries. This myth may be giving way, however, because Costa Rica has recently been declared a multi-ethnic country by the Legislative Assembly.

According to scholar Massimo Introvigne two variants of Costa Rican nationalism developed: a Christian nationalism linked to the Catholic identity of the Costa Rican, and an esoteric nationalism linked to the liberal and secular intellectual elite. The second would emerge especially influenced by The Theosophical Society, founded in the country in 1904 and that would include Costa Rica within the esoteric cosmology of Theosophy as a spiritually special place and would adapt many of the theosophical cosmogonic beliefs to the ethical context. For example, the book of the theosophist and first lady María Fernández Le Cappellain Zulia and its prequel Yolantá occurred both in the pre-Hispanic period and presented the Costa Rican indigenous peoples in utopian and idealized versions and as heirs of esoteric knowledge. Fernández was the wife of Federico Tinoco, a Costa Rican politician who led a coup d'etat that overthrew the constitutional president Alfredo González Flores and in whose government several theosophists held positions, described by some academics as a nationalist. In any case, esoteric and Catholic nationalism would come into conflict during the first half of the 20th century.

From these myths originate a series of elements typical of Costa Rican nationalism that derive from one or the other, as they are; an idyllic view of the colonial period, coffee producers as the foundation of the nation, Costa Rican centrism, ethnic democracy as exceptionally good, and the country's superiority over many of its neighbors, represented in the phrase "Central American Switzerland.

== History ==
Different nationalist sentiments have been awakened in the populations, especially during armed conflicts with their neighbors, such as the Filibuster War of 1856 against Nicaragua and the Coto War against Panama. In the elections of 1932 the businessman of German origin Max Koberg Bolandi was nominated by a political group called the Nationalist Party, but it was the least voted party in that election. Nationalism was one of the most outstanding elements of the government of León Cortés Castro (1936-1940) although it would not transcend too much after his presidency in the political discourse, especially because of the accusations of fascism that weighed on Cortes. After Cortés the nationalist discourse would always be associated with the extreme right. In the 1960s, the anticommunist Nationalist Movement emerged, which would later change its name to Free Costa Rica Movement, and which focused on combating all leftist political and social movements since the 1962 elections.

The Independent National Party of Jorge González Martén also identified itself as a nationalist party and its followers called themselves nationalists, as well as in their propaganda for the 1974 elections. Their organic heir the National Patriotic Party participated in the 2002 elections with a rabidly xenophobic anti-Nicaraguan speech and with testimonial results. In 2005 the Nationalist Democratic Alliance was founded to participate in the 2006 elections with former Minister José Miguel Villalobos Umaña as a candidate, but again the electoral success is nil. Since the end of that party there has been no other political force formally registered before the Supreme Electoral Tribunal that makes use of the nationalist term.
