= Frank Marshall Jiménez =

Costa Rican military officer and politician (1924–1994)

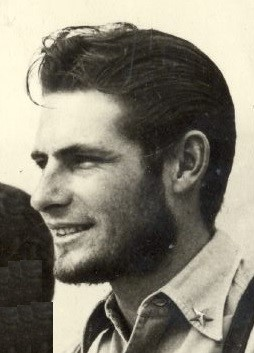
- Marshall c. 1958

Deputy of the Legislative Assembly of Costa Rica
- In office 1 May 1966 – 30 April 1970
- Preceded by: Seat established
- Succeeded by: Jesús Fernández Morales
- Constituency: San José (19th Office)
- In office 1 May 1958 – 30 April 1962
- Preceded by: Manuel Escalante Durán
- Succeeded by: Antonio Peña Chavarría
- Constituency: San José (15th Office)

President of the Revolutionary Civic Union
- In office 17 January 1957 – 22 September 1968
- Preceded by: Party established
- Succeeded by: Party abolished

Personal details
- Born: Francisco José Marshall Jiménez; 12 March 1924 San Ramón, Costa Rica
- Died: 2 November 1994 (aged 70) San José, Costa Rica
- Party: UCR (1955–1968)
- Spouse: Olga Montealegre Jiménez (m. 1945)
- Education: University of Costa Rica (BE)
- Occupation: Military officer; engineer; politician
- Nickname: El diablo rubio

Francisco José Marshall Jiménez (12 March 1924 – 2 November 1994) was a Costa Rican engineer, military officer and politician. He was the founder and leader of the Revolutionary Civic Union, an anti-communist, anti-Calderonist, and nationalist movement that operated as a paramilitary organization before becoming a political party in 1957. Marshall served twice as a deputy in the Legislative Assembly and was Minister of Public Security during the administration of President Francisco Orlich Bolmarcich.

Marshall was born in San Ramón, Alajuela, the son of American geologist George Marshall Carpenter and Emilia Jiménez Guardia, a descendant of President Tomás Guardia Gutiérrez. In 1945, he married Olga Montealegre, a member of a prominent Costa Rican family. His father worked for a mining company operating in Nicaragua and was reportedly killed by forces under the command of Augusto César Sandino. Following his father's death, his mother married Ricardo Steinvorth, a Costa Rican of German descent, who adopted and raised Marshall.

Through his adoptive father, Marshall acquired German citizenship and, in 1936, was sent to study at a boarding school in Hanover, Germany. During his stay he belonged to the Hitler Youth. He returned to Costa Rica after the outbreak of the Second World War and later earned a degree in engineering from the University of Costa Rica.

During the administration of President Rafael Ángel Calderón Guardia, Costa Rica declared war on Germany in 1941. As part of wartime measures, many residents of German, Italian, and Japanese ancestry were detained or had their property confiscated. Marshall's adoptive father was deported to the United States but was later released after demonstrating that he had been born in Costa Rica.

Marshall became an opponent of the Calderón Administration and joined the opposition during the Costa Rican Civil War of 1948. He fought in the National Liberation Army under the command of José Figueres Ferrer and Edgar Cardona Quirós, earning the nickname el diablo rubio ("the Blond Devil").

Following the victory of the revolutionary forces, Marshall was appointed Chief of Staff by Cardona, then Minister of Public Security. Later that year, President Figueres abolished the Costa Rican military despite opposition from Cardona and other officers. Cardona subsequently led the unsuccessful coup attempt known as El Cardonazo, after which the abolition of the army became permanent.

Marshall also participated in the defense of Costa Rica during the 1955 Calderonista invasion, commanding the Revolutionary Civic Union Battalion, then operating as a paramilitary force, against invading forces supported by former president Rafael Ángel Calderón Guardia and Nicaraguan dictator Anastasio Somoza García.

The Revolutionary Civic Union was reorganized as a political party in 1957, and Marshall was elected twice to the Legislative Assembly of Costa Rica. Prior to the 1962 general election, he reached an agreement with the National Liberation Party to support the presidential candidacy of Francisco Orlich Bolmarcich in opposition to Calderón. Following Orlich's victory, Marshall was appointed Minister of Public Security, serving from May to September 1962. During his tenure, Costa Rica and Nicaragua resolved several border incidents through diplomatic channels.

During the presidency of Luis Alberto Monge in the 1980s, Marshall organized the Patriotic Union, a far-right, anti-communist, and anti-Sandinista paramilitary organization that declared its support for the Costa Rican government amid tensions arising from the Nicaraguan Revolution and the war against the Contras.

Marshall died of coronary heart disease in San José on 2 November 1994, at the age of 70.
