= 1958 Costa Rican general election =

- 2 February 1958
- Presidential election
- Registered: 354,779
- Turnout: 64.70% (▼2.55pp)
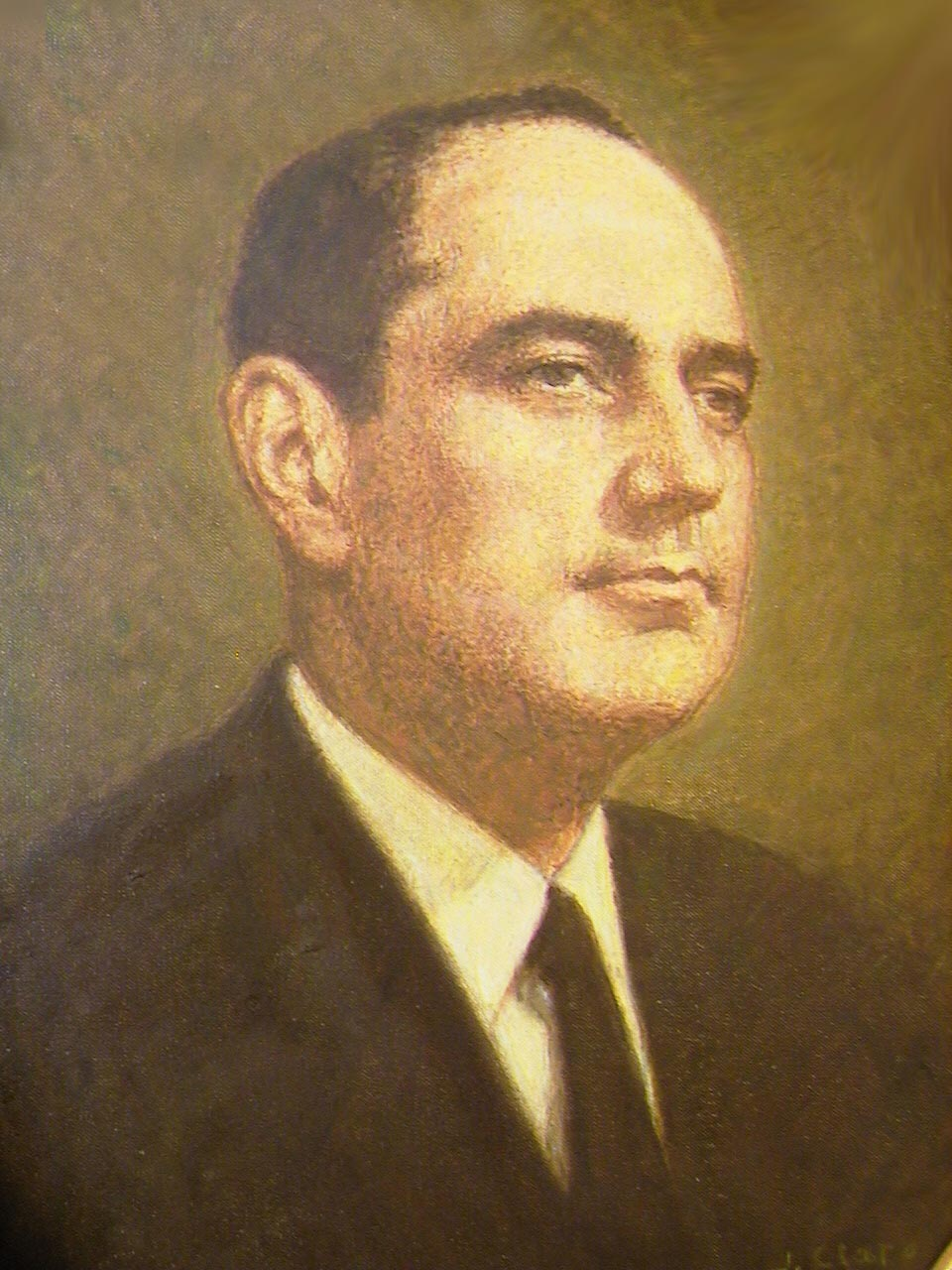

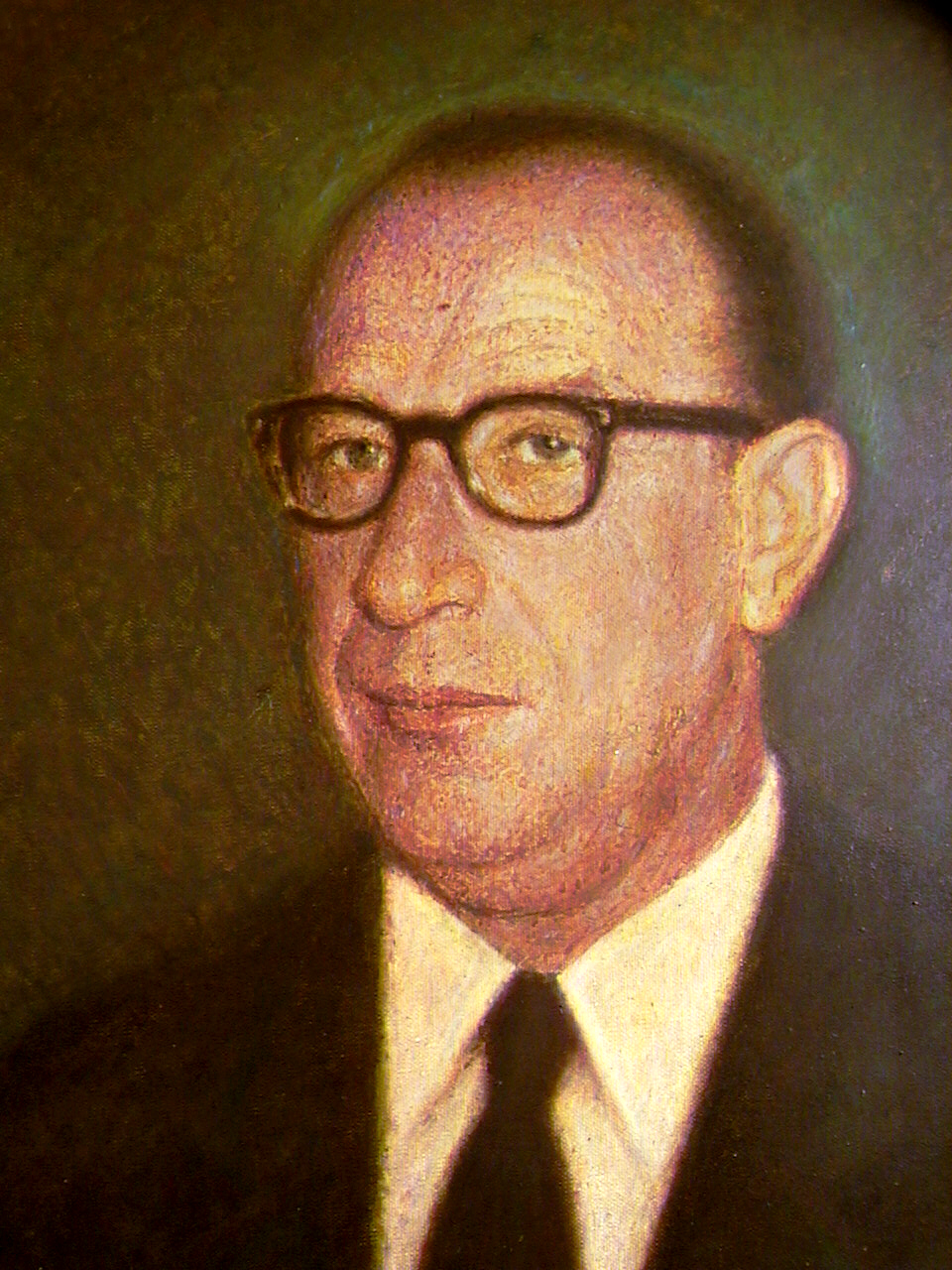

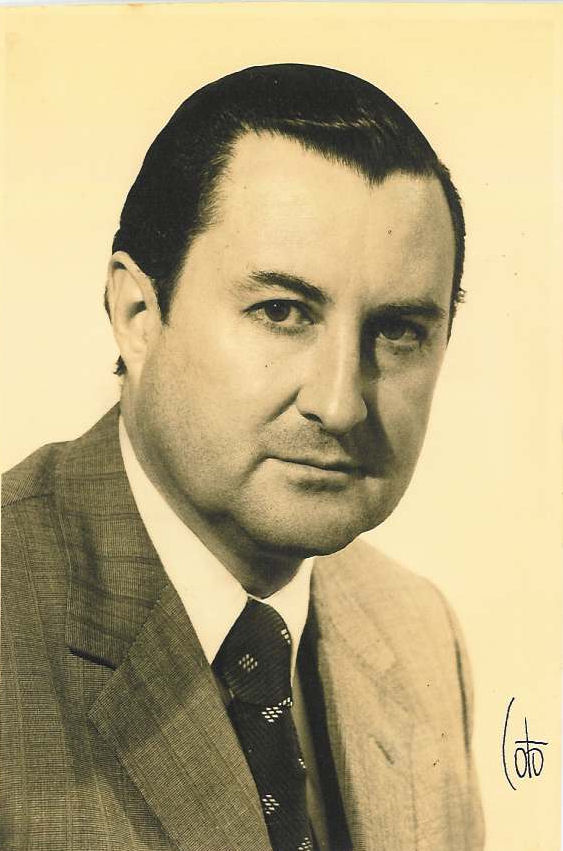
Nominee	Mario Echandi Jiménez	Francisco Orlich Bolmarcich	Jorge Rossi Chavarría
Party	PUN	PLN	PI
Running mate	Abelardo Bonilla; Joaquín Peralta	Otto Cortés; Rafael París	Mario Esquivel; Miguel Brenes
Popular vote	102,851	94,788	23,910
Percentage	46.42%	42.78%	10.79%
- Results by district Echandi: 30–40% 40–50% 50–60% 60–70% 70-80% 80-90% Orlich: 30–40% 40–50% 50–60% 60–70% 70-80% 80-90% 90-100% Rossi: 40-50% 60-70% Tie: 40-50%
President before election
José Figueres
PLN
Elected President
Mario Echandi
PUN
- Legislative election
- All 45 seats in the Legislative Assembly; 23 seats needed for a majority
- Turnout: 64.69% (▼2.82pp)
Party	Leader	Vote %	Seats	+/–
PLN	Francisco Orlich Bolmarcich	41.68	20	−10
PRN	Rafael Ángel Calderón Guardia	22.36	11	+8
PUN	Mario Echandi Jiménez	21.37	10	+9
PI	Jorge Rossi Chavarría	9.84	3	New
UCR	Frank Marshall Jiménez	3.32	1	New
This lists parties that won seats. See the complete results below.
Results by province

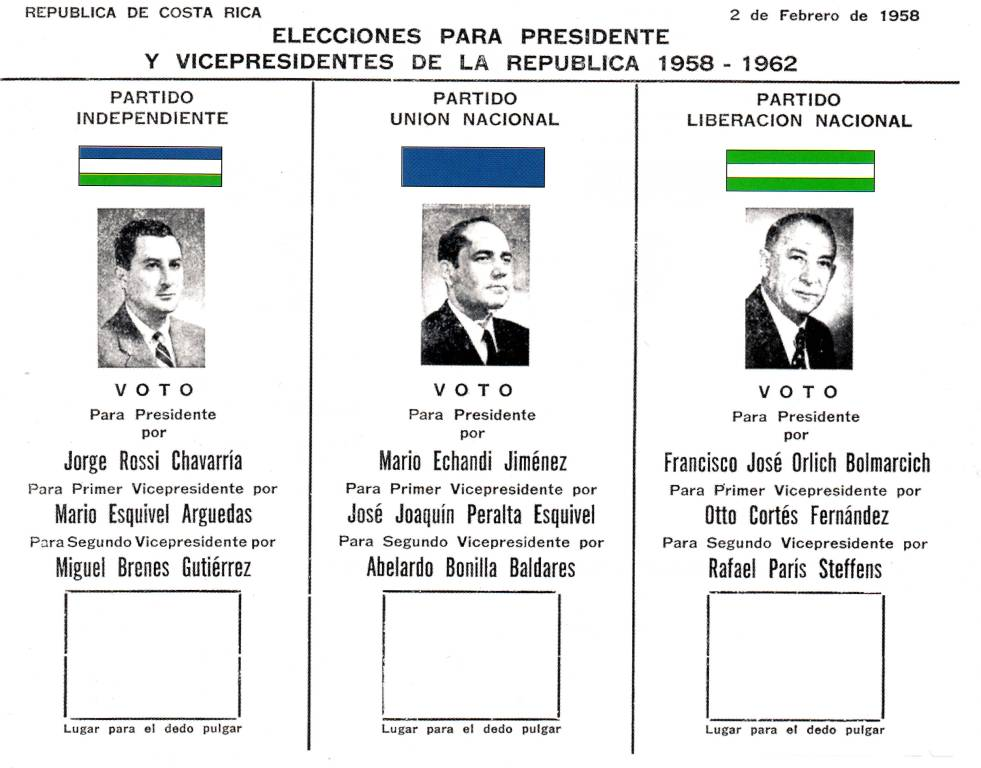
Ballot paper

General elections were held in Costa Rica on 2 February 1958. Mario Echandi Jiménez of the National Union Party won the presidential election, whilst the National Liberation Party won the parliamentary election. Voter turnout was 64.7%.

Echandi was the only deputy for the National Union Party fraction for the 1953-1958 period, and he was in open opposition to the National Liberation Party (PLN) legislative fraction and the executive power presidency of Figueres Ferrer, also of PLN. During the tense invasion of 1955 when former president Rafael Angel Calderon's supporters and their international allies tried to invade Costa Rica's territory and were successfully repelled by Figueres Ferrer' government, Echandi was accused of being Calderonista and been offered an office as minister from Calderón. Echandi denied it but was put under investigation by the Legislative Assembly. The opposition, encompassed by both Echandi's party National Union and Calderón's Independent Republican left the Assembly in protest. Still Echandi was acquitted and the old loyalties before the war were starting to switch. Echandi as candidate from National Union promised to allow Calderón and family (then exiled in Mexico) to return to Costa Rica and give a general amnesty for all of Calderón's supporters. This gained him the support of the Calderonism, still a powerful political base.

But, whilst PLN's opposition was closing lines, PLN was splitting. After a primary election that was won by Francisco José Orlich (one of PLN's founders and one of the leaders of the 1948 Revolution) his opponent Jorge Rossi left the party and founded a new one called Independent Party. As expected, Rossi's departure and his new party caused a spoiler effect dividing the Social Democratic vote and Echandi won the election with the support of Calderonists.

Echandi did fulfill his promise and allowed Calderón and family to return and passed a general amnesty for all factions.

== Results ==
=== President ===
Candidate	Party	Votes	%
Mario Echandi Jiménez	National Union Party	102,851	46.42
Francisco Orlich Bolmarcich	National Liberation Party	94,788	42.78
Jorge Rossi Chavarría	Independent Party	23,910	10.79
Total		221,549	100.00
Valid votes		221,549	96.52
Invalid/blank votes		7,994	3.48
Total votes		229,543	100.00
Registered voters/turnout		354,779	64.70
Source: Nohlen, Election Resources

==== By province ====
Province	Echandi %	Orlich %	Rossi %
San José	49.0	39.6	11.5
Alajuela	43.0	50.7	6.3
Cartago	37.1	40.5	22.4
Heredia	45.6	44.9	9.5
Puntarenas	54.2	39.2	6.6
Limón	54.1	38.9	7.0
Guanacaste	44.8	46.7	8.5
Total	46.4	42.8	10.8

==== By canton ====
San José
Canton	Echandi	Orlich	Rossi
Canton	%	%	%
San José	57.37	32.29	10.35
Escazú	38.04	47.62	14.35
Desamparados	38.06	49.34	12.59
Puriscal	33.57	57.46	8.97
Tarrazú	34.92	50.68	14.40
Aserrí	43.09	46.96	9.95
Mora	40.72	54.81	4.47
Goicoechea	53.78	35.65	10.57
Santa Ana	41.76	50.39	7.85
Alajuelita	51.82	38.67	9.62
Vázquez de Coronado	39.62	50.06	10.32
Acosta	34.40	57.74	7.87
Tibás	53.93	34.55	11.52
Moravia	46.71	37.13	16.16
Montes de Oca	55.74	34.30	9.96
Turrubares	48.13	46.26	5.60
Dota	32.67	50.31	17.02
Curridabat	37.83	44.93	17.24
Pérez Zeledón	20.89	54.35	24.75
Total	48.99	39.55	11.46

Alajuela
Canton	Orlich	Echandi	Rossi
Canton	%	%	%
Alajuela	43.04	49.88	7.08
San Ramón	62.13	32.81	5.06
Grecia	50.46	45.82	3.72
San Mateo	54.37	35.35	10.28
Atenas	41.91	48.20	9.88
Naranjo	57.71	36.35	5.94
Palmares	48.31	46.24	5.45
Poás	56.89	37.63	5.48
Orotina	41.78	54.22	4.00
San Carlos	55.65	35.95	8.40
Alfaro Ruiz	58.19	34.24	7.57
Valverde Vega	60.90	34.49	4.61
Total	50.75	42.96	6.29

Cartago
Canton	Orlich	Echandi	Rossi
Canton	%	%	%
Cartago	42.15	35.07	22.77
Paraíso	42.05	40.88	17.06
La Unión	47.25	40.97	11.78
Jiménez	43.93	39.92	16.15
Turrialba	28.12	41.82	30.06
Alvarado	44.93	26.22	28.85
Oreamuno	49.12	25.64	25.24
El Guarco	58.08	30.58	11.35
Total	40.51	37.11	22.37

Heredia
Canton	Echandi	Orlich	Rossi
Canton	%	%	%
Heredia	48.64	40.91	10.45
Barva	48.72	38.38	12.90
Santo Domingo	47.27	42.58	10.15
Santa Bárbara	39.48	53.79	6.73
San Rafael	39.84	52.00	8.15
San Isidro	32.74	62.14	5.12
Belén	43.91	50.19	5.90
Flores	47.11	41.93	10.96
Total	45.58	44.90	9.52

Guanacaste
Canton	Orlich	Echandi	Rossi
Canton	%	%	%
Liberia	44.19	45.40	10.41
Nicoya	49.68	39.13	11.20
Santa Cruz	37.02	54.78	8.20
Bagaces	56.80	37.53	5.67
Carrillo	46.19	44.30	9.50
Cañas	44.49	45.68	9.84
Abangares	50.11	46.84	3.04
Tilarán	56.59	40.40	2.91
Total	46.70	44.82	8.48

Puntarenas
Canton	Echandi	Orlich	Rossi
Canton	%	%	%
Puntarenas	50.97	40.46	8.58
Esparza	50.66	45.16	4.19
Buenos Aires	27.31	54.21	18.48
Montes de Oro	38.45	56.53	5.02
Osa	67.60	29.48	2.92
Aguirre	55.33	37.82	6.85
Golfito	64.44	31.59	3.97
Total	54.20	39.22	6.58

Limón
Canton	Echandi	Orlich	Rossi
Canton	%	%	%
Limón	49.57	44.13	6.30
Pococí	65.23	28.62	6.14
Siquirres	55.52	33.21	11.27
Total	54.07	38.90	7.02

=== Legislative Assembly ===
Party	Votes	%	Seats	+/–
National Liberation Party	86,081	41.68	20	–10
Republican Party	46,171	22.36	11	+8
National Union Party	44,125	21.37	10	+9
Independent Party	20,314	9.84	3	New
Revolutionary Civic Union	6,855	3.32	1	New
Democratic Opposition Movement	1,417	0.69	0	New
Democratic Party	939	0.45	0	–11
National Republican Party	614	0.30	0	New
Total	206,516	100.00	45	0
Valid votes	206,516	89.98		
Invalid/blank votes	22,991	10.02		
Total votes	229,507	100.00		
Registered voters/turnout	354,779	64.69		
Source: TSE, Election Resources

==== By province ====
Province	PLN		PR		PUN		PI		UCR		MDO		PD		PRN	
Province	%	S	%	S	%	S	%	S	%	S	%	S	%	S	%	S
San José	37.2	6	26.7	4	19.6	3	10.1	2	5.2	1	0.8	0	0.4	0	-	-
Alajuela	50.3	4	17.1	2	24.2	2	6.0	0	1.6	0	0.4	0	0.4	0	-	-
Cartago	40.2	3	13.9	1	17.3	1	20.1	1	4.8	0	0.7	0	0.5	0	2.5	0
Heredia	44.0	1	24.7	1	19.1	1	9.5	0	1.5	0	0.9	0	0.4	0	-	-
Puntarenas	39.2	2	26.9	2	24.9	1	6.5	0	1.2	0	0.7	0	0.7	0	-	-
Limón	40.7	1	25.5	0	26.3	1	5.4	0	1.1	0	0.7	0	0.4	0	-	-
Guanacaste	46.4	3	17.8	1	25.0	1	8.8	0	0.9	0	0.5	0	0.6	0	-	-
Total	41.7	20	22.4	11	21.4	10	9.8	3	3.3	1	0.7	0	0.5	0	0.3	0

==== By canton ====
San José
Canton	PLN	PR	PUN	PI	UCR	MDO	PD
Canton	%	%	%	%	%	%	%
San José	29.27	33.91	20.54	9.20	5.90	0.86	0.31
Escazú	48.11	18.60	16.81	13.49	1.91	0.79	0.29
Desamparados	43.35	18.01	17.63	10.34	9.27	0.80	0.59
Puriscal	57.62	10.80	20.92	8.85	0.57	0.46	0.77
Tarrazú	45.26	10.72	22.87	12.56	7.76	0.53	0.30
Aserrí	44.74	15.78	26.20	7.92	3.91	0.80	0.65
Mora	53.76	19.50	19.84	3.88	2.11	0.63	0.29
Goicoechea	33.76	31.43	18.62	9.11	5.46	1.30	0.33
Santa Ana	52.29	21.29	17.11	6.89	1.24	0.56	0.62
Alajuelita	37.17	26.54	23.68	7.89	3.29	0.88	0.55
Vázquez de Coronado	47.66	14.62	23.73	8.61	4.11	0.89	0.38
Acosta	56.62	15.88	17.60	7.26	1.32	0.68	0.64
Tibás	32.33	35.03	16.42	9.60	5.44	0.75	0.44
Moravia	35.50	29.48	14.95	12.81	5.54	0.95	0.77
Montes de Oca	33.77	27.14	24.50	8.33	5.03	0.85	0.39
Turrubares	47.77	12.76	33.09	4.75	0.89	0.59	0.15
Dota	46.68	12.86	20.16	14.06	5.44	0.80	0.00
Curridabat	41.65	21.65	14.43	14.87	5.48	1.48	0.43
Pérez Zeledón	53.55	5.77	12.08	22.79	4.79	0.42	0.60
Total	37.19	26.68	19.64	10.08	5.18	0.82	0.41

Alajuela
Canton	PLN	PUN	PR	PI	UCR	MDO	PD
Canton	%	%	%	%	%	%	%
Alajuela	41.72	23.87	25.10	6.56	1.85	0.50	0.40
San Ramón	63.57	21.06	8.92	5.33	0.48	0.28	0.35
Grecia	51.09	27.24	17.00	3.34	0.50	0.50	0.32
San Mateo	55.31	26.48	6.62	10.76	0.55	0.14	0.14
Atenas	41.91	37.06	10.35	8.71	1.17	0.15	0.66
Naranjo	59.21	19.88	13.76	5.32	0.95	0.45	0.45
Palmares	48.97	25.57	18.46	5.05	0.86	0.62	0.47
Poás	56.55	25.77	10.58	4.94	1.39	0.49	0.28
Orotina	42.25	35.12	16.97	3.94	0.86	0.43	0.43
San Carlos	50.84	18.38	16.28	7.99	5.64	0.54	0.34
Alfaro Ruiz	57.56	14.27	18.81	7.84	0.85	0.47	0.19
Valverde Vega	54.96	13.04	19.40	6.58	4.35	0.56	1.11
Total	50.33	24.22	17.05	5.97	1.58	0.44	0.41

Cartago
Canton	PLN	PI	PUN	PR	UCR	PRN	MDO	PD
Canton	%	%	%	%	%	%	%	%
Cartago	40.42	19.36	15.23	12.54	8.69	3.09	0.44	0.24
Paraíso	41.54	16.04	21.77	14.97	1.95	2.28	0.62	0.83
La Unión	45.61	11.27	15.30	19.84	2.59	3.59	0.85	0.95
Jiménez	48.25	13.38	24.34	10.31	1.10	1.21	0.82	0.60
Turrialba	29.16	28.14	18.14	17.99	2.60	2.59	0.94	0.44
Alvarado	46.33	27.65	9.90	11.53	1.53	2.04	0.61	0.41
Oreamuno	45.48	20.59	15.91	5.12	9.42	1.68	0.81	1.00
El Guarco	56.27	11.24	18.16	9.25	3.29	1.23	0.41	0.14
Total	40.22	20.06	17.32	13.87	4.83	2.53	0.68	0.49

Heredia
Canton	PLN	PR	PUN	PI	UCR	MDO	PD
Canton	%	%	%	%	%	%	%
Heredia	39.68	25.90	19.55	11.66	1.66	1.15	0.39
Barva	35.99	24.79	22.39	13.12	1.65	1.5	0.55
Santo Domingo	44.68	24.49	20.37	8.82	0.87	0.55	0.23
Santa Bárbara	53.13	22.29	16.56	5.34	1.83	0.46	0.38
San Rafael	51.44	22.95	15.53	8.20	1.01	0.47	0.39
San Isidro	61.94	9.42	21.29	4.26	2.32	0.65	0.13
Belén	47.71	36.01	9.00	4.83	1.55	0.57	0.33
Flores	39.85	21.33	26.66	9.73	1.31	0.56	0.56
Total	44.01	24.68	19.08	9.48	1.51	0.87	0.38

Guanacaste
Canton	PLN	PUN	PR	PI	UCR	MDO	PD
Canton	%	%	%	%	%	%	%
Liberia	44.60	27.30	15.84	10.91	0.60	0.30	0.45
Nicoya	49.83	23.02	14.58	10.72	0.66	0.50	0.70
Santa Cruz	37.61	23.25	26.10	9.40	2.47	0.43	0.74
Bagaces	55.23	19.90	16.84	6.63	0.51	0.13	0.77
Carrillo	44.74	31.84	9.95	11.68	0.81	0.56	0.41
Cañas	40.91	9.13	40.83	7.15	0.34	0.86	0.78
Abangares	50.27	33.73	11.50	3.18	0.36	0.42	0.54
Tilarán	55.03	29.27	11.42	3.19	0.05	0.54	0.49
Total	46.41	25.02	17.77	8.76	0.94	0.47	0.62

Puntarenas
Canton	PLN	PR	PUN	PI	UCR	MDO	PD
Canton	%	%	%	%	%	%	%
Puntarenas	40.40	22.73	25.88	8.19	1.62	0.63	0.54
Esparza	44.13	33.55	16.19	4.06	0.58	0.39	1.10
Buenos Aires	50.94	4.61	21.80	19.71	2.31	0.21	0.42
Montes de Oro	55.21	9.75	28.47	5.69	0.29	0.19	0.39
Osa	29.24	31.64	34.13	2.16	1.15	0.86	0.82
Aguirre	39.02	35.06	16.12	7.02	0.74	0.99	1.04
Golfito	32.10	35.42	26.13	4.13	0.85	0.94	0.43
Total	39.21	26.90	24.89	6.48	1.18	0.69	0.66

Limón
Canton	PLN	PUN	PR	PI	UCR	MDO	PD
Canton	%	%	%	%	%	%	%
Limón	46.69	19.75	27.06	4.70	0.92	0.72	0.16
Pococí	28.75	42.28	22.83	4.18	0.92	0.16	0.87
Siquirres	33.50	29.65	23.03	10.05	1.84	1.26	0.67
Total	40.72	26.28	25.52	5.37	1.05	0.67	0.39

=== Local governments ===
Party	Votes	%	Seats			
Party	Votes	%	Alderpeople	+/–	Municipal syndicates	+/–
National Liberation Party	88,893	42.53	125	–38	263	–47
National Union Party	50,400	24.11	70	+65	32	32
Republican Party	43,715	20.91	47	+42	23	23
Independent Party	21,419	10.25	12	New	2	New
Revolutionary Civic Union	3,834	1.83	0	New	0	New
Cartago National Republican Party	720	0.34	0	New	0	New
Limonense Independent Party	49	0.02	0	New	0	New
Total	209,030	100.00	254	+17	320	–4
Valid votes	209,030	90.90				
Invalid/blank votes	20,927	9.10				
Total votes	229,957	100.00				
Registered voters/turnout	354,962	64.78				
Source: TSE
