= Grand Lodge of Costa Rica =

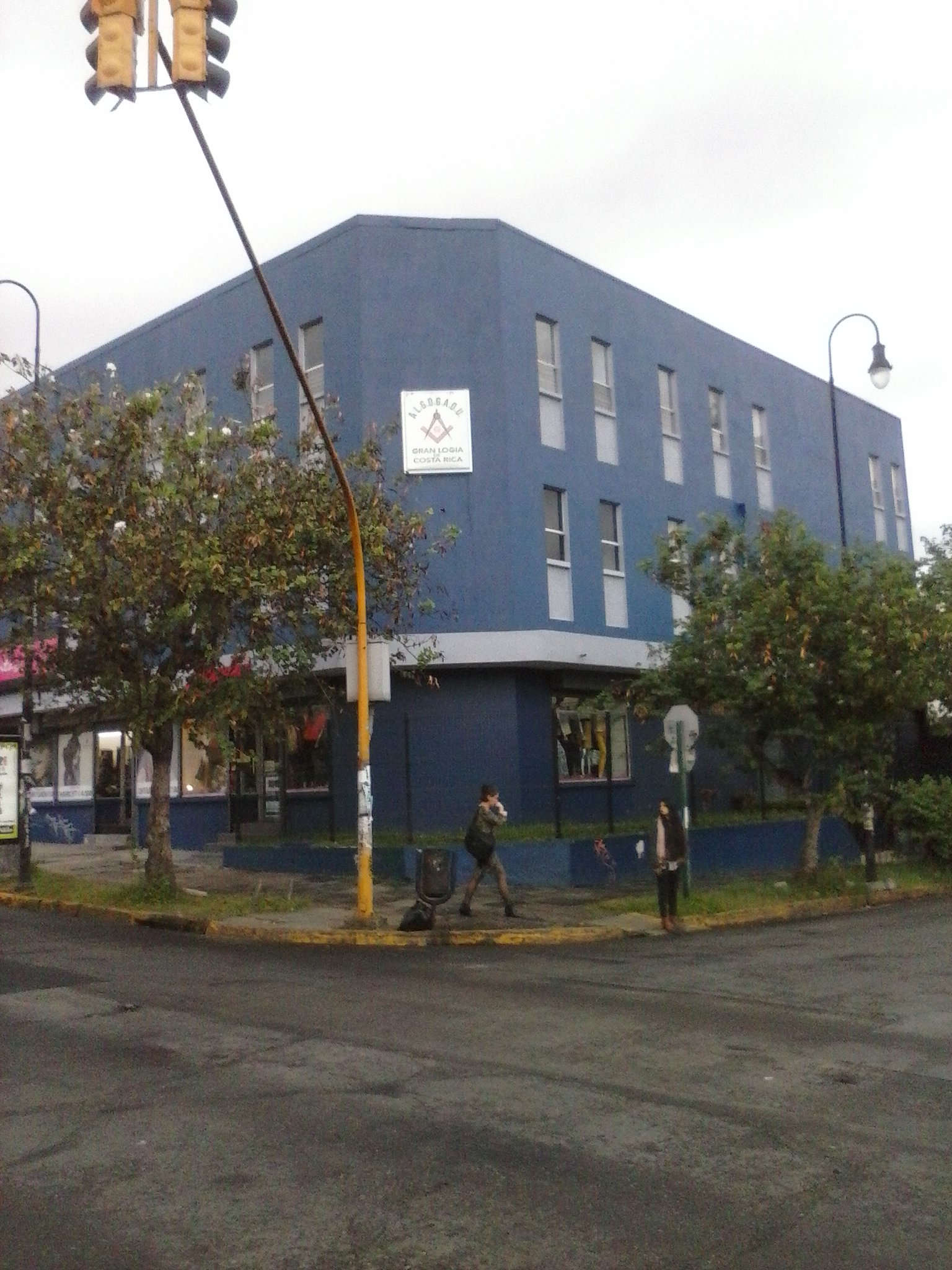
Gran Logia Masónica de Costa Rica's see

The Grand Lodge of Costa Rica is the main organization of regular Freemasonry in Costa Rica. It was created on December 7, 1879 and was the first in Central America.

It was formed with the union of all the existing lodges at that time in the country, these were: Charity, Hope, Faith, Fraternal Union, Progress, Wonder, Sincere Friendship, Disillusion, Concord and the Future, Regeneration, Fraternal Union, The Light, Freedom and Phoenix.

They use the Scottish Rite, the Rectified Scottish Rite, the Rite of Strict Observance and the York Rite. The lodges that comprise it are exclusively male.

In 2013, he sponsored the 46th Meeting of the Central American Confederation of Masons.

The headquarters of the Grand Lodge is located in Cuesta de Moras, San José, next to the Legislative Assembly where the Rafael Obregón Loría Masonic Museum is also located. The Grand Lodge also directs the Masonic Pro Charity Foundation.

== See also ==
- Freemasonry in Costa Rica
- Women's Club of Costa Rica
