= María Fernández de Tinoco =

Costa Rican writer and amateur archaeologist

- Born: María de las Mercedes Elodia Fernández Le Cappellain; 22 January 1877; San José, Costa Rica
- Died: 23 November 1961 (aged 84); San José, Costa Rica
- Other names: María Fernández Le Cappellain, María Fernández Le Cappellain de Tinoco, María Fernández Le Cappellain de Tinoco Granados, pseudonym Apaikán
- Occupations: writer, archaeologist
- Spouse: Federico Tinoco Granados (m. 1898; died 1931)

María Fernández de Tinoco (22 January 1877 – 23 November 1961) was a Costa Rican writer and amateur archaeologist who became the First Lady of Costa Rica in 1917. Educated in England, Fernández studied archaeology, art and music before returning to Costa Rica. Involved in amateur archaeological digs and charitable works, she wrote articles for publication in local newspapers and magazines and published two novels. When her husband staged a coup d'état and was later elected President of Costa Rica, she served as First Lady from 8 June 1917 to 20 August 1919. When he resigned from his post due to mismanagement, the couple moved to Paris, where she participated in archeological and artistic works until his death in 1931. From 1932 to 1934, she resided in Norway before returning to Costa Rica, where she resumed her archeological studies and publishing, while working for the National Museum of Costa Rica. Involved with the Red Cross, she was awarded the Florence Nightingale Medal in 1949 and in 2012, the Ministry of Culture of Costa Rica produced a documentary about her life.

== Early life ==
María de las Mercedes Elodia Fernández Le Cappellain, known as Mimita, was born on 22 January 1877 in San José, Costa Rica to Ada Le Cappellain Agnew and Mauro Fernández Acuña. She was the second of the couple's seven children. Her father was a politician and was involved in the creation of the first secondary school for women in Costa Rica, having hired his sister-in-law, Marian Le Cappellain to found the school. Both Ada and her sister Marian were natives of the Channel Islands, grew up on Guernsey, and had previously taught in Costa Rica. After studying with Juanita Acuña, Fernández completed her education abroad in England, studying archaeology, art and music. She returned to Costa Rica and on 5 June 1898 in San José, married Federico Alberto de Jesús Tinoco Granados. Federico's family were friends of her parents, and like Fernández, he had been educated abroad.

== Career ==
While husband became involved in politics, Fernández de Tinoco became involved as one of the founding members of the Theosophical Society in 1904. She was interested in learning about and exploring indigenous cultures and began making amateur archaeological digs on the family farm. One such dig in 1907, led her to conceive of the plot for a novel. In 1909, under the pseudonym Apaikán published two works Yontá and Zulai in a single volume. The novels were the first works by a Costa Rican author to focus on indigenous people. Yontá gives the background story for Zulai, though it was written last. Both are based on theosophical themes and deal with the sentimental entanglement of two generations of lovers. In Yontá, the main character's name, an indigenous woman meets a mystic from India who brings eastern rituals and religion to the Americas. The couple produce a son, Ivo, who in the second book, Zulai, falls in love with Zulai. Their love is tragically doomed by the jealousy of the caciques.

In addition to the novels, Fernández de Tinoco published other scholarly works on archaeology and was a collaborator with Ángela Acuña Braun in the journal Fígaro, which had been founded in 1914. She also devoted time to charitable endeavors, such as co-founding the Costa Rican branch of La Gota de Leche (A Drop of Milk) and El Abrigo de los Niñoswas (The Children's Shelter) in 1913 and becoming involved in 1915 with the first Boy Scout Troop of Costa Rica. She published articles on a variety of subjects in newspapers, including the Diario de Costa Rica, La Hora, and La República, and magazines like Repertorio Americano and Revista de Archivos Nacionales.

On 27 January 1917, Fernández de Tinoco's husband, Federico, staged a coup d'état overthrowing the presidency of Alfredo González Flores and in the elections that followed in April, he was elected president. When his term began on 8 June 1917, Fernández de Tinoco became the First Lady of Costa Rica, acting as the hostess of numerous banquets, receptions and public ceremonies, on behalf of her husband. She continued her charitable works, establishing the Children's Commissary of San José (Spanish: Children's Commissary of San José and was involved with the Costa Rican branch of the Red Cross. Abuses and mistakes in her husband's government forced her husband to resign on 20 August 1919. The couple fled the country, traveling by way of Jamaica to Paris.

In France, Fernández de Tinoco joined a group of archaeologists and continued to participate in the field. She also served as an assistant to launch the Exhibition of Aboriginal Art of Spanish America, held in 1928 in Paris. When her husband died in 1931, she moved to Oslo, where her sister Ada, and brother-in-law, Antonio J. de Amaral Murtinho, were living. She attended a reception for Lord Baden Powell, founder of the Boy Scouts, held in Oslo in 1932, but within two years, decided to return home to Costa Rica.

Taking a position with the National Museum of Costa Rica, Fernández de Tinoco, undertook archaeological expeditions throughout the country for the next six years. One of these expeditions made in 1935, to Chira Island was discussed in a paper Chira, la olvidada cuna de aguerridas tribus precolombinas (Chira, the forgotten cradle of warlike pre-Columbian tribes) and another Una ocarina huetar de 18 notas del Museo Nacional de Costa Rica (An ocarina of the Huetar people with eighteen notes in the National Museum of Costa Rica). She also worked as a teacher and then briefly lived in Rio de Janeiro, where her sister Ada and her family had been transferred when their time in Oslo ended. Between 1943 and 1946, she lived in Winona, Minnesota with a friend, Harriet Buck and spent time working with the American Red Cross and in 1949, Fernández de Tinoco was awarded the Florence Nightingale Medal. She participated as a delegate for Costa Rica in the August 1946 International Conference of Archaeologists, which was held in Honduras and in 1950, helped in the organization of the Central American Art Exhibition held in Panama. After this time, she began to have heart problems and slowly withdrew from public activities.

== Death and legacy ==
Fernández de Tinoco died on 23 November 1961 in San José, Costa Rica. In 2012, a documentary, La ocarina de Cuesta de Moras (The ocarina of the Cuesta de Moras, which is the address of the National Museum and a play on the title of her 1937 article on the ocarina) was produced by the Ministry of Culture and Youth, detailing the life story of Fernández de Tinoco.
