= Roberto Brenes Mesén =

Costa Rican politician (1874–1947)

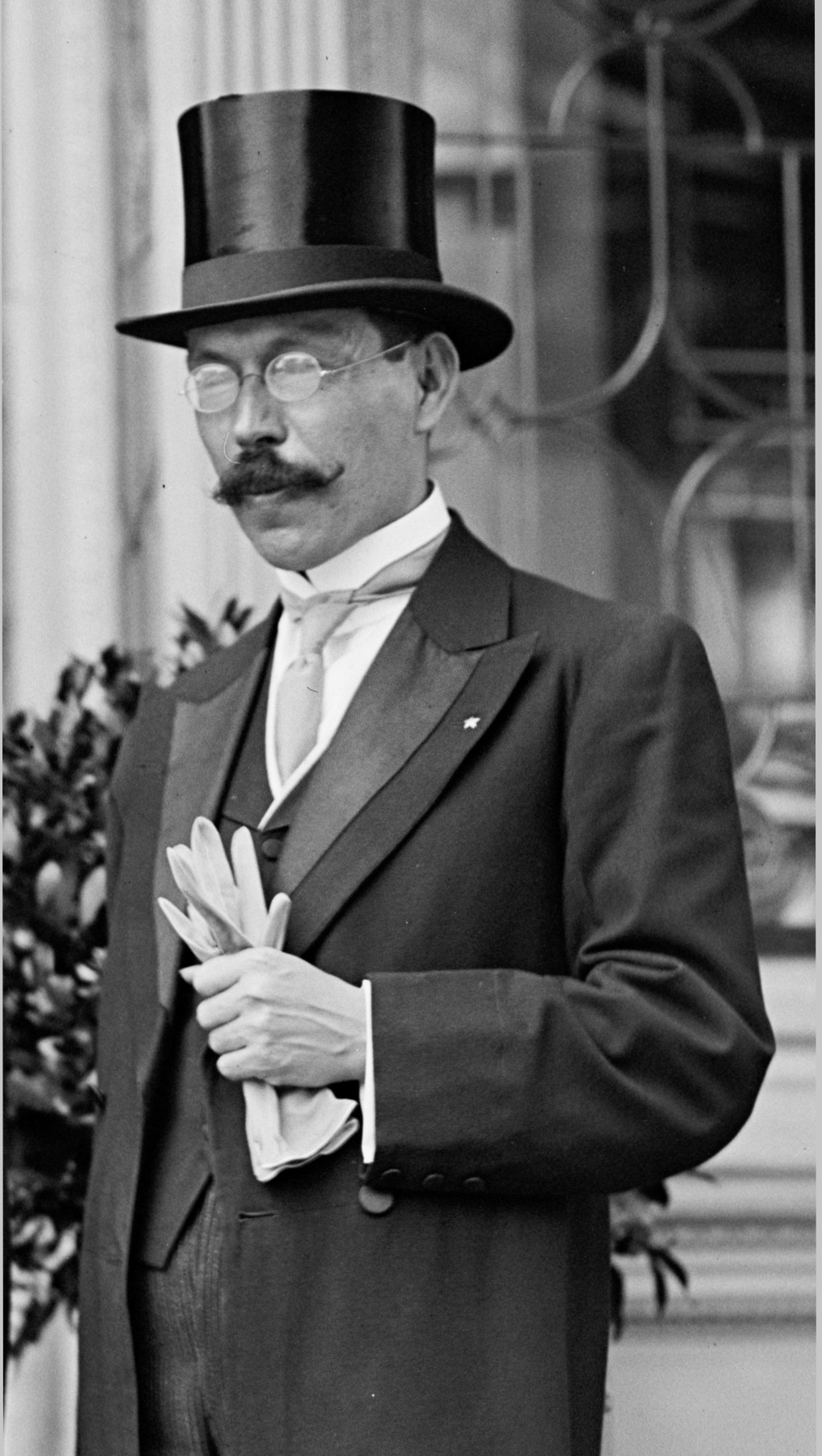

Roberto Brenes Mesén (July 6, 1874 – May 19, 1947), was a Costa Rican politician, writer, educator, and journalist.

== Biography ==
Brenes Mesén born in San José, Costa Rica on 6 July 1874. He went to school and high-school in San José. He obtained his Maestro Normal degree in the Escuela Normal de Heredia, where he was later employed. In 1897 he left for Chile on a scholarship, where he studied law, French and Latin. He later studied philology in the Instituto Pedagógico de Chile. He returned to Costa Rica in 1900 and taught Castellano, Psychology and Logic in the Liceo de Costa Rica. He also became the Liceo de Heredia's first headmaster from 1905 to 1908.

In 1917, under Federico Tinoco's dictatorship he was named Minister for Public Education. A year later he left for the United States under voluntary exile. In the United States Brenes Mesén was employed in varied roles, including Minister for Costa Rica in Washington, and as professor at Northwestern University, Columbia University, University of New Mexico and Syracuse University.

During the first decade of the 20th century, he began working as a journalist, and he began attending political meetings with Joaquín García Monge. Although he was living in the United States, in 1928 he became part of the so-called Civic League, with Carmen Lyra, Joaquín García Monge, Omar Dengo, Alfredo González Flores and José María Zeledón. This group was engaged in promoting and fighting for workers' rights. They fought against the government benefits to the United Fruit Company, the Atlantic Rail Company and other Minor Cooper Keith companies.

He left the United States in 1939 or 1940 at the age of 65 as a retired professor. He continued writing articles for the biggest newspapers and magazines in Costa Rica promoting education. Brenes Mesén once said "This country educated to earn a living, but not to become happy, while man's happiness should be the goal of all education". His publications also included poetry, including Poesias de amor y muerte.

Some of his works were controversial at the time, such the argument he held with the Catholic Church over the teaching of Darwin's theory of evolution in the Liceo de Heredia and mixed instruction.

He was a member of the Theosophical Society of Costa Rica, American Association of Teachers of Spanish and Portuguese and a freemason.

He died in San José on 19 May 1947 and was declared Benemérito de la Patria in 1974. The first high school in Hatillo, San José was named after Brenes Mesén in 1965.
