= Progressive Liberal Party (Costa Rica, 1889) =

Costa Rican political party

The Progressive Liberal Party was a Costa Rican political party that participated in the 1889 presidential election. Alongside the other newly formed party, the Democratic Constitutional Party (conservative), was one of the first political parties in the history of Costa Rica and the first in participating in a presidential election.

The party was founded by the liberals of the Olympus Generation and nominated Ascensión Esquivel Ibarra for president. He had the full support of the then liberal president Bernardo Soto Alfaro but lost the elections before José Joaquín Rodríguez Zeledón. Soto and several members of the Army considered rejecting the results and handing over the power to Esquivel, but the Church - which supported Rodriguez - called the people to defend the results and, fearing a civil war, Soto handed power to Carlos Durán who At the same time, he duly handed it over to Rodríguez when the period ended. After the elections, the party split into two; the Independent Democratic Party and the People's Party.
