= 1889 Costa Rican general election =

- 3–5 November 1889 (popular vote); 1 December 1889 (electoral college)
- Presidential election

467 members of the Electoral College 234 votes needed to win
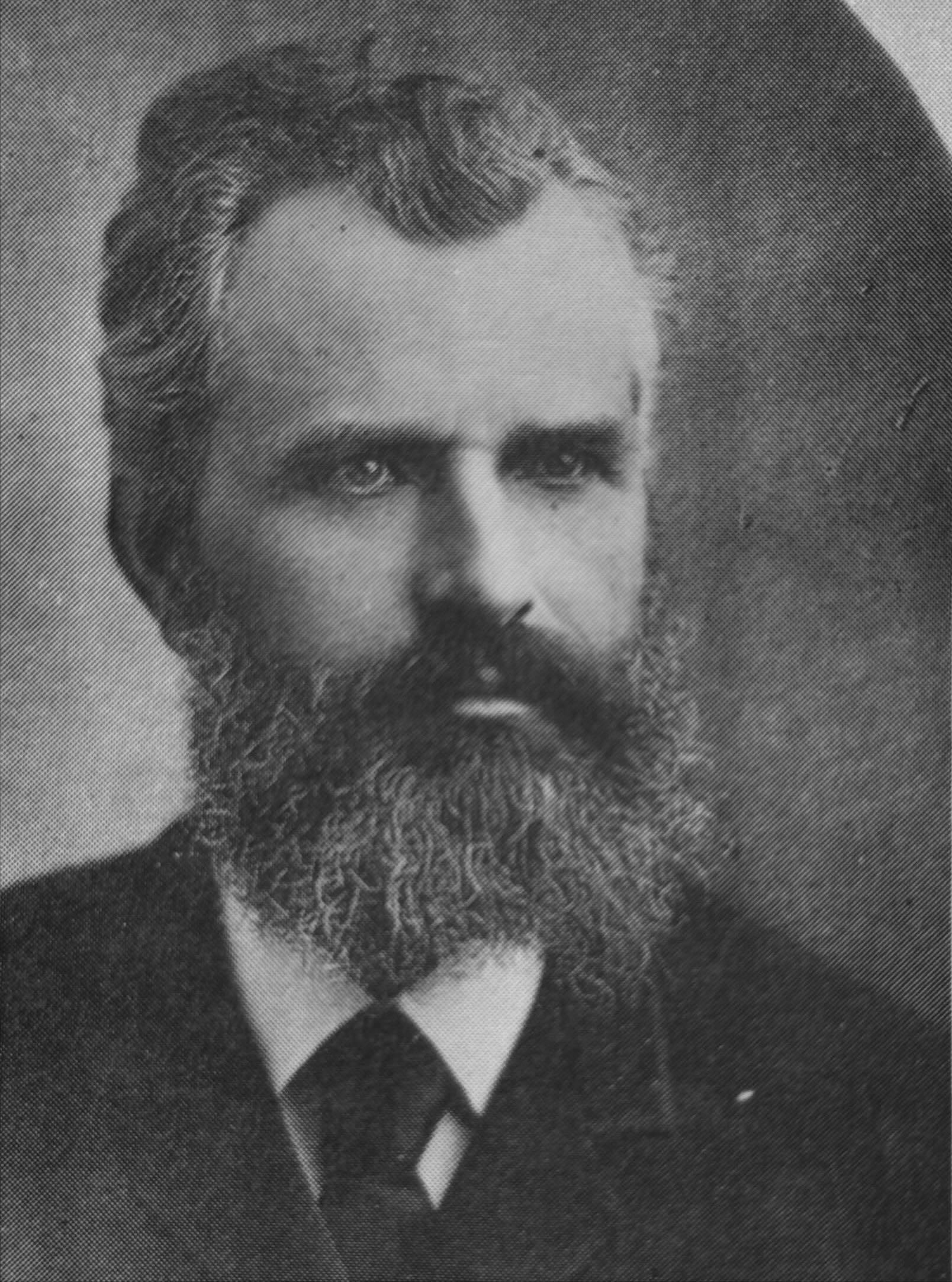

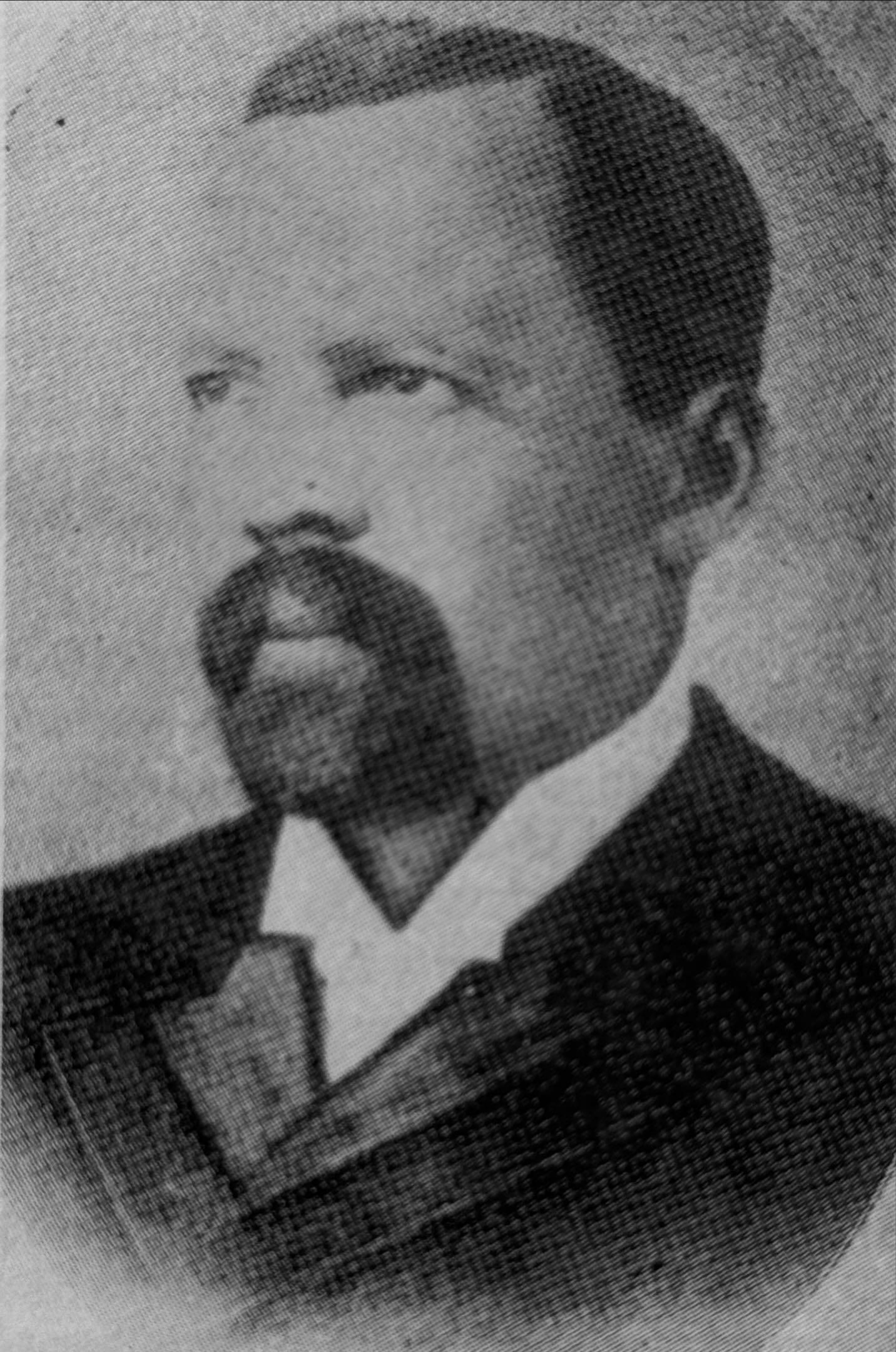
Nominee	José Joaquín Rodríguez Zeledón	Ascensión Esquivel Ibarra
Party	PCD	PLP
Electoral vote	377	86
Percentage	80.73%	18.42%
- Estimated results by province
President before election
Carlos Durán Cartín (acting)
Independent
Elected President
José Joaquín Rodríguez Zeledón
PCD
- Legislative election
- 12 of the 23 seats in the Constitutional Congress
Party	Leader	Seats	+/–
PCD	José Joaquín Rodríguez Zeledón	9	New
PLP	Ascensión Esquivel Ibarra	3	New
This lists parties that won seats. See the complete results below.

General elections were held in Costa Rica in 1889 to elect the president and half of the Constitutional Congress. Opposition candidate José Joaquín Rodríguez defeated the government-backed candidate Ascensión Esquivel by a wide margin, marking the first instance in which an incumbent-backed candidate was defeated at the polls. The election is also notable as the first in Costa Rican history in which organized political parties formally participated.

The date of 7 November is commemorated in Costa Rica as "Democracy Day" in recognition of the liberal government’s acceptance of the electoral victory of the conservative opposition. This outcome represented a significant departure from earlier political practices, as authoritarian governments had previously been the norm.

== Electoral system ==
Elections at the time were conducted in two stages. In the first stage, eligible male citizens voted to select second-degree electors, who in turn elected the president from among the candidates. Voting by citizens in the first stage was public, while the electors cast their ballots by secret vote in the second stage. Eligibility requirements for electors generally included property ownership and literacy, resulting in an electorate drawn primarily from wealthy families and the middle class.

The electors selected both the president and the deputies to the Constitutional Congress for four-year terms. They met in assemblies held in the capital city of each province, presided over by the provincial governor, who was appointed by the president. For the 1889 election, a total of 591 electors were to be chosen nationwide, although 124 ultimately did not participate in the second round of voting.

== Background ==
Following independence in 1821 and during the early First Republic, liberal factions of varying orientations dominated Costa Rican politics. Unlike in many other Latin American countries, where liberal and conservative groups frequently alternated in power through conflict, Costa Rica’s presidents—beginning with José María Castro Madriz—were almost all adherents of some form of liberalism, with only one exception. This prolonged period of liberal dominance, often referred to as the Liberal State, was sustained through alliances among the liberal intellectual elite, the coffee-growing bourgeoisie, and the military.

Relations between liberal governments and the Catholic Church were generally cooperative until the presidency of Próspero Fernández Oreamuno, a Freemason and prominent liberal. His secularizing and anticlerical policies led to increased tensions with the Church. In response, the Church supported its own candidate for the presidency: the conservative-leaning lawyer José Joaquín Rodríguez Zeledón, running under the Constitutional Democratic Party, which had been founded on 19 June 1889. The governing liberal elites, meanwhile, openly backed Ascensión Esquivel Ibarra, Second Designate to the Presidency, who was also a Freemason and a member of the so-called Olympus Generation, an influential circle of liberal intellectuals. President Bernardo Soto Alfaro had previously allowed Esquivel to exercise presidential authority during the period known as the “Government of the 100 Days,” from May to August of that year.

== Campaign ==
During the campaign, the Constitutional Democratic Party used the national flag as its electoral symbol, while the Liberal Progressive Party adopted a red flag, traditionally associated with liberal movements in Latin America. Rodríguez was accused by opponents of seeking to establish a religious government, despite his public support for the separation of church and state. Esquivel, in turn, was criticized for his affiliation with Freemasonry, his liberal political views, and his Nicaraguan origin.

Rodríguez’s candidacy achieved decisive victories in the provinces of Heredia and Cartago, which were among the country’s more traditional and Catholic-leaning regions, as well as in Puntarenas. He also won by wide margins in San José and Alajuela, where Esquivel received approximately 27% of the vote. Esquivel’s relative strength in the latter has been attributed to its historically strong liberal tradition and the political influence of President Bernardo Soto. Esquivel secured a landslide victory in Guanacaste, a result commonly attributed to his long-standing ties to the province, where he spent part of his childhood and youth.

Rodríguez won the popular vote in the first round of voting, but Soto initially declared Esquivel the victor and organized a military parade in his support on 7 November. In response, the Catholic Church mobilized its supporters to demonstrate in defense of the electoral results. Amid concerns over the possibility of civil conflict, Soto withdrew from active governance without formally resigning. His successor, Carlos Durán Cartín, subsequently oversaw a peaceful transfer of power to Rodríguez.

Although the exact popular vote totals are unknown, contemporary estimates suggest that Rodríguez received approximately 73.3% of the vote, while Esquivel obtained about 26.7%.

== Results ==
Candidate	Party	Votes	%
José Joaquín Rodríguez Zeledón	Constitutional Democratic Party	377	80.73
Ascensión Esquivel Ibarra	Liberal Progressive Party	86	18.42
Ricardo Jiménez Oreamuno	Independent	3	0.64
Carlos Durán Cartín	Independent	1	0.21
Total		467	100.00
Valid votes		467	100.00
Invalid/blank votes		0	0.00
Total votes		467	100.00
Registered voters/turnout		591	79.02
Source: TSE

=== Second round results by province ===
Province	Rodríguez	Esquivel	Jiménez	Durán
San José Province	112	2	0	1
Alajuela	94	36	0	0
Cartago Province	81	0	0	0
Heredia	75	0	0	0
Guanacaste	0	48	0	0
Puntarenas	15	0	0	0
Limón	0	0	3	0
Total	377	86	3	1
Source: TSE

=== Constitutional Congress ===
Party	Seats	+/–
Constitutional Democratic Party	9	New
Liberal Progressive Party	3	New
Total	12	–
Source: Ocontrillo, El Día
