= Baháʼí Faith in Costa Rica =

The Baháʼí Faith in Costa Rica begins when ʻAbdu'l-Bahá mentions it as one of the places Baháʼís should take the religion to in 1919. However the first pioneers began to settle in Coast Rica in 1940 followed quickly by the first Baháʼí Local Spiritual Assembly being elected in San José in April 1941. The National Spiritual Assembly was first elected in 1961. As of 2009 Baháʼís sources indicate the national community includes various peoples and tribes and over 4,000 members organized groups in over 30 locations throughout the country. The Association of Religion Data Archives (relying mostly on the World Christian Encyclopedia) estimated some 13000 Baháʼís in 2005.

== Pre-history ==
=== ʻAbdu'l-Bahá's Tablets of the Divine Plan ===
ʻAbdu'l-Bahá, the son of the founder of the religion, wrote a series of letters, or tablets, to the followers of the religion in the United States in 1916-1917; these letters were compiled together in the book Tablets of the Divine Plan. The sixth of the tablets was the first to mention Latin American regions and was written on April 8, 1916, but was delayed in being presented in the United States until 1919—after the end of the First World War and the Spanish flu. The sixth tablet was translated and presented by Mirza Ahmad Sohrab on April 4, 1919, and published in Star of the West magazine on December 12, 1919. After mentioning the need for the message of the religion to visit the Latin American countries ʻAbdu'l-Bahá continues:

... becoming severed from rest and composure of the world, [they] may arise and travel throughout Alaska, the republic of Mexico, and south of Mexico in the Central American republics, such as Guatemala, Honduras, El Salvador, Nicaragua, Costa Rica, Panama and Belize...

Following the Tablets and about the time of ʻAbdu'l-Bahá's passing in 1921, a few other Baháʼís began moving to, or at least visiting, Latin America.

=== Seven Year Plan and succeeding decades ===
Shoghi Effendi, who was named ʻAbdu'l-Bahá's successor, wrote a cable on May 1, 1936 to the Baháʼí Annual Convention of the United States and Canada, and asked for the systematic implementation of ʻAbdu'l-Bahá's vision to begin. In his cable he wrote:

"Appeal to assembled delegates ponder historic appeal voiced by ʻAbdu'l-Bahá in Tablets of the Divine Plan. Urge earnest deliberation with incoming National Assembly to insure its complete fulfillment. First century of Baháʼí Era drawing to a close. Humanity entering outer fringes most perilous stage its existence. Opportunities of present hour unimaginably precious. Would to God every State within American Republic and every Republic in American continent might ere termination of this glorious century embrace the light of the Faith of Baháʼu'lláh and establish structural basis of His World Order."

Following the May 1st cable, another cable from Shoghi Effendi came on May 19 calling for permanent pioneers to be established in all the countries of Latin America. The Baháʼí National Spiritual Assembly of the United States and Canada was appointed the Inter-America Committee to take charge of the preparations. During the 1937 Baháʼí North American Convention, Shoghi Effendi cabled advising the convention to prolong their deliberations to permit the delegates and the National Assembly to consult on a plan that would enable Baháʼís to go to Latin America as well as to include the completion of the outer structure of the Baháʼí House of Worship in Wilmette, Illinois. In 1937 the First Seven Year Plan (1937–44), which was an international plan designed by Shoghi Effendi, gave the American Baháʼís the goal of establishing the Baháʼí Faith in every country in Latin America. With the spread of American Baháʼís communities and assemblies began to form in 1938 across Latin America.

== Developments in Costa Rica ==
=== First arrivals ===
In March 1940 Gayle Woolson came from the United States as the first pioneer to settle in Costa Rica. She was joined by Almalia Ford before April when they, along with four Costa Ricans, held a memorial service for the death of May Maxwell. There were four Costa Ricans convert to the religion by August 1940. In October 1940 the group was able to have printed a translation of a pamphlet authored by Shoghi Effendi characterizing the religion. By March 1941 there were 10 Baháʼís in San José and they were able to elect the first local spiritual assembly in San José in April 1941 and by November a study group was established in the Puntarenas Province.

=== Wider attention and movement ===
After starting plans in January 1941 for a radio broadcast by Ford covering Central and South America the broadcast was successfully accomplished November 26, 1941. By June 1942 magazines in Costa Rica were publishing stories on the religion including Repertorio Americano of Joaquín García Monge. After first arriving in Panama in January 1940 and working for a time in San Salvador John Eichenauer pioneered in Costa Rica starting October 1941 for a time and his activities were covered in local newspapers before he moved onto Honduras in 1942. He was drafted by June 1943 and left the area. Eichenauer would later play an important role in the re-development of the Baháʼí Faith in Germany. After the first conversions in January 1942 in April 1943 an assembly was elected in Puntarenas and by June a group studying the religion began in Alajuela Province.

=== Latin American connections ===
An All-American Convention was held in 1944, and Raul Contreras was the delegate from Costa Rica. At the same time, Gerardo Vega, of Costa Rica, was the first Latin-American native to pioneer when he began work in Panama. After 1946 Woolson became more involved in developments in Panama and a regional committee overseeing Panama, Costa Rica, Nicaragua was appointed. In January 1947 Panama City hosted the first congress of the northern Latin Americas to build a new consciousness of unity among the Baháʼís of Central America, Mexico and the West Indies to focus energies for the election of a regional national assembly. Its members were Josi Antonio Bonilla, Marcia Steward, Natalia Chávez, Gerardo Vega, and Oscar Castro. By July 1947 Costa Rican pioneer Marcia Steward was appointed secretary of the committee and planning a periodical for the region. Secretary for this publication would be Guillermo Arias. Retrospectively a stated purpose for the committee was to facilitate a shift in the balance of roles from North American guidance and Latin cooperation to Latin guidance and North American cooperation. The process was well underway by 1950 and was to be enforced about 1953.

=== A new campaign ===
At the Panamanian conference Steward mentioned a campaign had begun and demanded her return to Costa Rica. It was explained more in May 1947 that she and others had advertised in major newspapers of several cities along these lines:

We are seeking people of good will to organize a Center of Study and Teaching founded on the following principles (a formulation of Baháʼí teachings). This movement already has affiliated groups established in all the major countries of the world, which function by means of the collective consultation of all their members. Without obligation, you may ask for literature and every kind of information by writing to (address in San Jose).

From this advertising 45 enquiries came. In response to these letters individual letters were returned with pamphlets. Upon further letters pains were taken to answer questions and the enquirer was asked if they wanted to start a class in their area and receive Baháʼí literature. Over time and further communication further books were sent and then they were offered a declaration card, and if registered they were offered the chance to form a registered group. In this fashion groups of Baháʼís were established in Quepos, Limón, Turrialba, Ciudad Quesada, aka San Carlos, and Heredia. In 1947 there was an assembly elected in Quepos though the brief Costa Rican Civil War stopped its meetings for a time. By October 1947 this method was being used in Chile (and continued at least into 1966.) Chile returned the favor when Lucha G. de Padilla, wife of the former consul-general of Chile to the United States, came to Costa Rica in May 1948 after joining the religion by January 1942 though Costa Rica was increasingly sending out pioneers of its own. However, there was disruption in the community that required "re-activating" the community in San Jose by April 1950, other assemblies having failed to be re-elected though the regional committees continued operation.

=== Reforming the Costa Rican community ===
A regional National Spiritual Assembly for Central America in 1951 when also the Quepos assembly was re-elected. A letter of the regional assembly noted that "Considerable attention is being paid to stressing the need throughout the area of a much greater understanding of the administration of the religion. Local assemblies are being taught, by means of the National Teaching Committee and the Baha'i Bulletin to acquire a much higher concept of their own importance as governing bodies. They are being groomed slowly but surely to realize that they are not merely groups of nine people gathered together in a purely spiritual unity, but nine members of a governing body, gathered together to maintain order and peace in their own communities, resolve their problems through the medium of prayer and consultation and to devise efficient ways and means of spreading the Faith in the territory under their immediate jurisdiction." The second and third meeting of the regional assembly was held in San Jose. And San Jose hosted the second election of the regional assembly in April 1952. Hand of the Cause Dorothy Beecher Baker attended the convention. Another Hand of the Cause, Dhikru'llah Khadem, visited the reformed community in Limón in 1953. The 1954 elected regional assembly also met in San Jose and pioneers returned to Puntarenas and Heredia while the assembly of Escazu was again elected. In April 1956 Alajuela was again listed as an active community (but not an assembly yet.) In 1958 Esmarilda Thompson de Vega pioneered into the rural lands near Guanacaste. In July 1960 the last convention for the regional assembly was again held in San Jose.

In 1961 Costa Rican Baháʼís elected their own National Spiritual Assembly with its seat in Uruca. The convention was attended by Hand of the Cause Dhikru'llah Khadem. The elected assembly was composed of Esteban Canales, Richard Milkovich, Humberto Ulloa F., Theodore Cortazzi, Antonio Soto G., Jose Barquero, Edgard Gomez, Aaron Barnes, John Rutan. A number of pioneers came and went over the period into the 1960s and assembly statuses fluctuated - two assemblies were noted in 1963 in Escazu and San José. In 1963 the members of the National Assembly, and thus participated in the first election of the Universal House of Justice, were Jose Baltodano, Aaron J. Bames, Esteban Canales, Theodore Cortazzi, Jean Dobbs, Richard Mirkovich, John Rutan, Antonio Soto, and Fernando Soto.

== Modern community ==
Since its inception the religion has had involvement in socio-economic development beginning by giving greater freedom to women, promulgating the promotion of female education as a priority concern, and that involvement was given practical expression by creating schools, agricultural coops, and clinics. The religion entered a new phase of activity when a message of the Universal House of Justice dated 20 October 1983 was released. Baháʼís were urged to seek out ways, compatible with the Baháʼí teachings, in which they could become involved in the social and economic development of the communities in which they lived. Worldwide in 1979 there were 129 officially recognized Baháʼí socio-economic development projects. By 1987, the number of officially recognized development projects had increased to 1482. Below you will find a number of internal and external projects Baháʼís in Costa Rica have entered into over the years. Meanwhile, there were developments in the religion in other ways too. In 1984-5 official and semi-official visits by distinguished visitors to the Baháʼí World Centre have increased and included the ambassador to Israel from Costa Rica at roughly the same time musicians from 14 countries met for an international conference for Baha'i musicians, including Charles Wolcott, which served as an exhibition of indigenous dance and music, a memorial to Baháʼís suffering Persecution and an opportunity to visit a local children's hospital, orphanage, a school and a local theatre to play for children and staff - two traveling musicians joined the religion during the conference. At the end of 1985 Costa Rica co-sponsored Resolution 40/141 of the United Nations General Assembly adopted by a vote of 53–30 with 45 abstentions concerning the human rights situation in Iran even though a number of Arab and Muslim delegations made it clear that they would support the resolution if, and only if, the references to the Baháʼís were deleted. About the same time the Baháʼís of Costa Rica hosted an awards banquet for Human Rights giving awards to Luis Demetrio Tinoco Castro, the original delegate from Costa Rica for the founding of the United Nations, and the first signatory of the first statement on human rights offered by the UN. In 1987 Baháʼís hosted an even at the national center by inviting people from Taiwan, Korea and Indonesia in Costa Rica to an International Baháʼí Dinner. Also in 1987 the Baháʼís of Costa Rica co-sponsored a Family Education for Peace seminar at University for Peace with the Society of the Friends (Quacker) at which a number of papers were presented from authors across North America. About 30 Baháʼís from eight countries participated in a similar seminar held with an interfaith prayer service for peace sponsored by (and at) the University for Peace and the government of Costa Rica in 1990 - the interfaith service was televised live in Costa Rica.

=== People ===
Ruth (née Yancey) Pringle is among the Baháʼís who pioneered to Costa Rica, moving in 1953 and lived in various Latin American countries and served in various positions until she was named as a Continental Counselor in 1980 and then she lived many of her last years in Costa Rica until she died in 2003. Cecilia King Blake is among those that continued to arrive and lived there since the 1970s and is named as having an influence on the growth of the religion across Costa Rica and nearby countries. Hand of the Cause Rúhíyyih Khanum visited Costa Rica in 1981 as part of visiting six Central American countries. In Costa Rica she met president Rodrigo Carazo Odio, one of his advisers and spent nearly an hour with the president's wife. She also participated in a weekend conference for believers, spoke at a large public meeting and a unity feast, and made a trip by air to Talamanca.

=== Indigenous peoples ===
After the national assembly sponsored a four-day Indian school in Amubri, Talamanca near the Sixaola River. In the national convention of 1964 members of the Talamanca and Terraba (see Indigenous peoples of Costa Rica) were among the delegates. In 1966 construction began on a new teaching institute on the Baháʼí endowment property in Alajuela and also in 1966 the community raised the number of assemblies from fourteen to twenty. In February 1970 pioneer family of Samuel and Teresa Garcia and their four children, native Costa Ricans, in February 1970 to the area of Guanacaste seeking to identify members of lapsed communities. Come April 1970 eight Local Assemblies were re-established following which a number of programs were initiated to solidify the understanding of some of these new Baháʼís. In 1980 two teams of Native American Baha'is from Alaska, Canada and the United States representing 10 tribes under the name Trail of Light traveled from the north to the south starting mid June and taught in Mexico, Belize, Costa Rica, Guatemala, Honduras, Panama, Bolivia, Chile, Peru and finally Ecuador. While in Panama they gathered with more than 1,000 Guaymi Baháʼís joined by Costa Rican Guaymi, Talamanca, Teribe representatives and they agreed on founding a Native Council for the Panamanian and Costa Rican tribes. In 1984 a reprise of the 'Trail of Light' was undertaken when an international team of five Baháʼís spent 17 days in Guatemala; they were a Mapuche Indian from Chile, a Quechua from Peru, a Bribri from Costa Rica, and two Guaymis from Panama. A beautification project in 1984 was held in Guanacaste province inspired by the Baháʼí gardens on Mt. Carmel as well as reading prayers - thirty people joined the religion during the project. There was also a chance to record some Bribri chanted prayers which would be broadcast on the radio. A 1984-5 continuation of the 'Trail of Light' process brought Costa Rican indigenous Baháʼís into Veracruz Mexico. In 1988 Costa Rica was represented at the fifth Continental Indigenous Council among the 400 participants.

=== Youth ===
The first international Baha'i Youth Conference held in Costa Rica came about in 1972 two days after the Managua earthquake. However a minibus full of young people came through Honduras with only minor difficulties and two Nicaraguan youth got through. Total attendance was about seventy-five. 1977 also saw the first time a Baháʼí float was entered in one of the annualfestivals in Santa Cruz. A larger conference of about 200 gathered in January 1978. Some of the attendees, together with various adults, then took a trip into Guanacaste province where over a short time 14 new assemblies were founded and then they extended work into Meseta province (see San Ramón for mention of this remote province) where several groups were re-contacted and a new assembly elected. In 1983 the Universal House of Justice recognized the twin youth conferences of Honduras and Costa Rica held in early March - a challenge representing a substantial increase in the number of youth Baháʼís - and called on them to consider the example of ʻAbdu'l-Bahá in civilizing influences they should undertake individually and collectively. In the fall of 1984 a permanent site for the National Youth Institute was chosen and plans were developed for it to serve as a center for the arts and performance, agriculture and outreach programs. A television crew made up of two youth from EI Salvador, a Baháʼí from Venezuela, and two non-Baha'i volunteers filmed Costa Rica's 1988 international youth conference which was attended by 120 people for a program to be aired in El Salvador.

=== Women ===
In early 1976 Baháʼí women from many northern Latin American countries including Costa Rica gathered in El Salvador for a women's conference sponsored by the Continental Counselors of Central America and the event included meetings among the Baháʼís only as well as invited non-Baháʼís. Some of the attendees called for further meetings and in 1977 the National Women's Committee decided to sponsor monthly teas in communities all over Costa Rica which continued into 1979. The purpose of the teas was to give Baháʼí and non-Babá'í women a chance to discuss their changing role in society, and also for non-Babá'ís to hear of the religion. Men have asked to attend and help though the focus of the discussions remained the role of women and the equality of women and men. In early 1977 an unusual conference, composed of 1/3 indigenous believers from across Central America - and some non-Baháʼí family members of them were allowed to fully attend the meeting - held in Mérida, Mexico. Costa Rica, Guatemala, Honduras and Mexico were priority goal areas for them. In early 1980 the Baháʼí Committee for the Education of Women and Children organized a day-long institute where one hundred children ages 3 to 14 and 35 adults participated in a village. In 1985 fifty-eight people from six of the seven provinces attended a Baháʼí Women's Conference which was planned to help strengthen contact between Baháʼí women of various groups in Costa Rica and to clarify the role of women in the religion. Presentations were made on the lives of May Maxwell and Martha Root and mentioned local Baháʼí women who pioneered to Costa Rica when the religion was first being established in Costa Rica.

=== Demographics ===
By 1975 there were thirty-eight assemblies in Guanacaste and a total of 50 across Costa Rica. The national community is made includes both citizens of the, Guanacaste, Puntarenas and Limón provinces, and indigenous peoples Bribri, Cabecar and Guaymí. The Baháʼís estimate the membership in Costa Rica at 4,000 members and has organized communities in over 30 locations throughout the country. The Association of Religion Data Archives (relying on World Christian Encyclopedia) estimated some 13402 Baháʼís.

== See also ==
- Religion in Costa Rica
- History of Costa Rica
- Baháʼí Faith and Native Americans
