= Women's Club of Costa Rica =

Women's Club in Costa Rica

- Club de Mujeres de Costa Rica
- Motto: Friendship through Service; Values: Service • Friendship

- Location within Costa Rica Location within Central America Location within North America
- Abbreviation: WCCA
- Formation: 1940
- Founder: Elizabeth Robinson Oreamuno
- Type: Women's club
- Location: San José, Costa Rica
- Coordinates: 9°55′57″N 84°04′48″W
- Region served: Central Valley
- Members: 250 (2015)
- Official language: English
- Subsidiaries: Professional Women's Group (PWG), Amigos Asociados
- Website: wccr.org
- Formerly called: USA Woman's Club of Costa Rica (1940-60), USA International Women's Club of Costa Rica (1960-1965)

The Women's Club of Costa Rica (Spanish: Club de Mujeres de Costa Rica) is a San José, Costa Rica organization established in 1940 that raises funds for charity. Originally founded by and for Americans in Costa Rica, the women's club now includes members of many nationalities.

== History ==
Elizabeth Robinson Oreamuno founded the USA Women's Club in 1940. She was an American who moved to Costa Rica with her spouse, prominent doctor and politician Alberto Oreamuno Flores. The group drew members from the sudden increase in Americans living in Costa Rica during the buildup to World War II. While the organization discussed establishing a clubhouse, instead they met at a variety of locations such as the U.S. Embassy, hotels, churches, homes, and local restaurants, including a Pizza Hut.

The membership of the organization evolved over time as, originally, only Americans expatriates and their dependents were admitted. Most of these early members were the wives of American diplomats and businessmen who had both money and, thanks to domestic staff, time. In response to the publishing of The Ugly American, U.S. ambassador Whiting Willauer asked the group to include local Tica women and to change their name to be more inclusive in 1959. As a result, the group changed their name to "USA International Women’s Club" the next year and half the members were Costa Rican by 1964.

All women who speak or are learning English are now eligible to join and the WCCR established a Professional Women's Group (PWG) in 2010 to broaden their appeal. By 2015, membership included fifteen nationalities.

== Activities ==
While the club provides time for women to bond and socialize, much of that is intertwined with the group's charitable endeavors. The group donated an iron lung in 1952, began an ongoing campaign for scholarships for rural students in 1977, donated the country's first mammogram machine in 1980, funded a radionovela on domestic violence in 2000, and began another ongoing campaign to create school libraries in 2004.

In order to fund these efforts, the WCCR holds frequent fundraisers including an annual bazaar, special showings at the Little Theatre Group, bilingual cookbooks of member recipes, silent auctions, formal dances, bake sales, fashion shows, and a thrift shop in the local American Legion hall.

The group routinely receives high profile guests, either for presentations or to assist with their fundraising. These include U.S. Ambassador Anne Slaughter Andrew, astronaut Franklin Chang-Díaz, Costa Rican Planning and Economic Policy Minister Laura Alfaro, lyric soprano singer Christine Komatsu, and Latin jazz band Editus.

== See also ==
- List of women's clubs
- Liga Feminista Costarricense
- Grand Lodge of Costa Rica
- American International School of Costa Rica
