= Calderonista invasion of Costa Rica =

1955 rebellion in Costa Rica

Calderonista Invasion of Costa Rica (1955)
- Part of History of Costa Rica
Date	January 11–21, 1955
Location	Costa Rica
Result	Costa Rican government victory

Belligerents
Costa Rica	Calderón forces Supported by: Nicaragua; Venezuela; Dominican Republic Guatemala (Diplomatic Support)

Commanders and leaders
José María Figueres Ferrer	Rafael Ángel Calderón Guardia Anastasio Somoza Rafael Leónidas Trujillo Marcos Pérez Jiménez

Strength
9,000 troops	3,500 troops 15 tankettes 5 planes 4 armored vehicles

Casualties and losses
39 killed	58 killed 1 plane shot down Several tankettes captured

The Calderonista Invasion of Costa Rica was a small rebellion carried out in North-West Costa Rica by forces loyal to the disgruntled former president Rafael Calderón, and was supported by the Government of Nicaragua who were unhappy with the election of Jose "Pepe" Figueres Ferrer to the Costa Rican Presidency two years prior.

== Summary ==
Don José Figueres Ferrer was elected president in 1953. Since late 1954, a group of Costa Ricans in favor of restoring Calderón Guardia, then in Mexico, to power, began preparing a movement in Nicaragua to overthrow the Figueres administration, with the complicity of the Somoza regime, since the dictatorial president of Nicaragua, Anastasio Somoza García, alleged that members of the Caribbean Legion, a supposed group of political exiles from the Caribbean nations, had participated in a conspiracy to assassinate him with the help of Figueres.

Apparently Somoza made plans with Trujillo (dictator of the Dominican Republic) to retaliate and then supported Calderón Guardia, who commanded a band of rebels in southern Nicaragua under the military leadership of Major Teodoro Picado Lara, son of former President Teodoro Picado, who invaded the country through the northern border, some invaders even reaching Villa Quesada (now Ciudad Quesada) in San Carlos, on January 11, 1955.

Figueres immediately appealed to the Organization of American States (OAS) to investigate; a commission discovered that the supplies and war material came from Nicaragua. As soon as this became public, Nicaragua ceased aid to the Calderonist rebels, who were mostly Costa Ricans. Meanwhile, the country organized itself through its Public Forces, reservists, and volunteers. The United States sold four warplanes, at the symbolic price of $1 each, to Costa Rica to aid in its defense.

There were some battles and skirmishes in several towns, especially in Santa Rosa, where the remains of some tanks still remain. But the rebels were no match for the government forces, which enjoyed great popular support, and they were driven back across the border into Nicaragua. In early 1956, Costa Rica and Nicaragua agreed to cooperate in monitoring their border.

== Beginning ==
The rebellion started on 7 January 1955 when forces loyal to former president Rafael Calderón, who were backed by the Nicaraguan president Anastasio Somoza García, crossed the border from Nicaragua into Costa Rica. Venezuelan dictator Marcos Pérez Jiménez provided financial support to the rebels and, reportedly, air support. The rebel forces seized the border town of Villa Quesada on 12 January.

Jose Figueres accused the CIA of covertly aiding Nicaragua's invasion by sending pilots and sorties to covertly attack Costa Rica, notably subjecting at least 11 villages to machine gun fire.

== Resolution ==
The Costa Rican government appealed to the Organization of American States to investigate. The Organization of American States found the Nicaraguan government was supporting the rebels and as soon as this was announced, the Nicaraguan government ended its support of the rebels. The United States sold Costa Rica four fighter planes, while the rebels were overwhelmed by the popularly backed government forces. After some fierce fighting in a handful of northern towns, the rebels were pushed out of Costa Rica.
