= Reform (disambiguation) =

Reform is beneficial change.

Reform, reformed or reforming may also refer to:

== Media ==
- Reform (album), a 2011 album by Jane Zhang
- Reform (band), a Swedish jazz fusion group
- Reform (magazine), a Christian magazine

== Places ==
- Reform, Alabama
- Reform, Mississippi
- Reform, Missouri

== Religion ==
- Religious reform, the process of reforming teachings within a religious community
- Reform (Anglican), an evangelical organisation within Anglicanism
- Reform Judaism, a denomination of Judaism

== Reformed ==
- Reformed Christianity or Calvinism, a Protestant branch of Christianity
- "Reformed" (Steven Universe), an episode of Steven Universe

== Reforming ==
- Catalytic reforming, a chemical process in oil refining
- Reforming Movement, a French centrist political group created in 1972
- Steam reforming, catalytic oxidation to produce hydrogen from hydrocarbons

== Other ==
- Reform (horse) (1964–1983), a Thoroughbred racehorse
- Reform (think tank), a British think tank
- Reform Act, a series of 19th- and 20th-century UK voting reforms
- Reform Club (disambiguation)
- Reform Movement (disambiguation)
- Reform Party (disambiguation)
- Reform UK, a British right-wing political party

== See also ==
- La Reforma or The Liberal Reform, a period in 19th-century Mexico when the modern nation state was born
- Non-reformist reform, a term identifying reforms which are transformative
- Prison reform, reform of the prison system
- The Reform Institute, defunct American think tank
- Reforma (disambiguation)
- Reformation (disambiguation)
- Reformasi (disambiguation)
- Reforme (disambiguation)
- Reformer (disambiguation)
- Reformism
- Wesleyan Reform Union, an independent group of Methodists in the United Kingdom
