= Religion in Costa Rica =

Religion in Costa Rica (CIA World Factbook 2021)
1. Catholicism (official) (47.5%)
2. Protestantism (21.0%)
3. Jehovah's Witnesses (1.40%)
4. No religion (27.0%)
5. Other religions (3.10%)

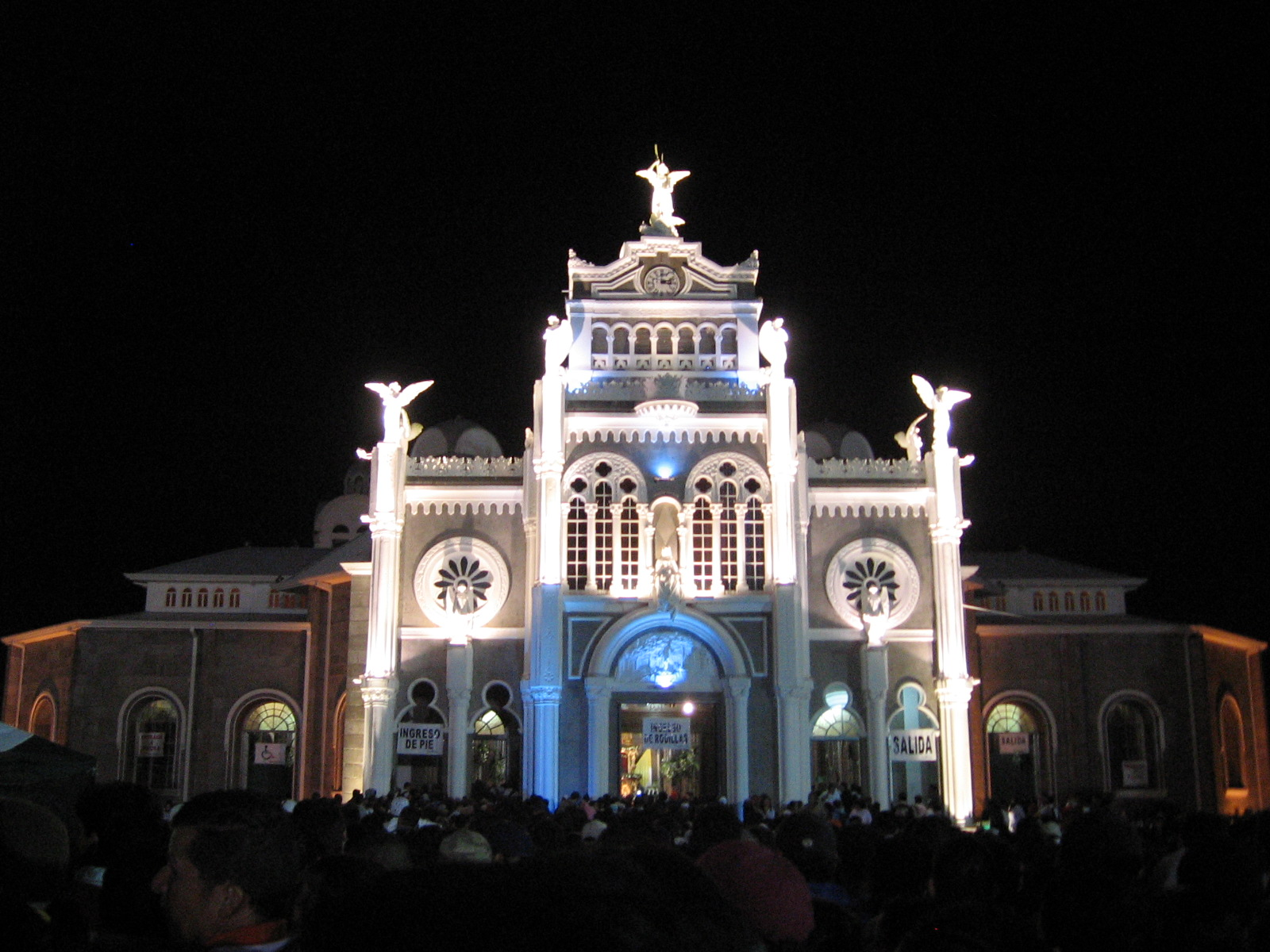
The Basilica of Our Lady of the Angels in Cartago.

Christianity is the predominant religion in Costa Rica, with Catholicism being its largest denomination. Catholicism is also the state religion, but the government generally upholds people's religious freedom in practice.

== Established religion ==
Catholicism is the official state religion and is entitled to state support according to the 1949 Constitution, which at the same time guarantees freedom of religion. It is the only state in the Americas with a state religion and one of the few Western countries which established Catholicism as its state religion; other such countries are microstates in Europe: Liechtenstein, Monaco, Vatican City and Malta.

The Constitution also forbids in its 28 article the use of religious feelings for electoral purposes, prohibition also contemplated in the Electoral Code. In theory, religious-based parties are banned since 1889 (precisely as a way to ban the then Church-endorsed Catholic Union party), however in practice Evangelical parties do exists, with its base mostly extracted from and directed toward the neo-Pentecostal community. The Supreme Electoral Tribunal has ruled that their existence is allowed as long as they do not use religion directly in their propaganda (which is what the Constitution forbids), however this provision has not always been fulfilled and the TSE has sanctioned certain campaigns for the use of religion in them.

The Constitution also limits the possibility for members of the clergy to be elected, as some of the requirements to be President, Vice-president, Minister or Justice is to be a layperson. Recent rulings from the Constitutional Court established that, as only the Catholic Church is official and the other religions are not regulated by it or the law, this prohibition applies only to Catholic priests, thus the clergy from other religions like Protestant pastors, Orthodox priests, rabbis, Buddhist monks, etc., in theory, can be candidates to these offices.

There is no law regulating religious bodies in Costa Rica. The Electoral code reinforces the constitutional prohibition of using religious propaganda and the Labor Code establishes the right from non-Catholics to have their respective religious holidays exchange from one of the national holidays and/or their vacations, which the employer has to comply. However, there is no specific legislation that regulates religions. The Associations’ Law establishes the existence of "religious association" and some religions register as such, but this status has no notable difference from any other form of Association, and many religions also prefer the “cultural association” registry.

Being registered as a religion does not provide any special responsibility nor any legal advantage and is not mandatory for private or public practice as far as other laws are not broken. Only the Catholic Church can be tax exempt, only the Catholic Church can receive state funds and property transferrals and only its marriages are legal without the need of a lawyer. Most religions register as association (whether cultural or religious) to be legally capable of hiring personal and own properties, however this is not mandatory and small religious groups like small neo-Pagan covens or new religious movements do not register at all and are allowed to practice as far as they do not disrupt public order or general legislation.

Currently a bill endorsed by the Evangelical parties in the Legislative Assembly of Costa Rica named "Freedom of Religion and Cult Act" is under discussion in one of the committees. The bill expects to regulate religions and give non-Catholic churches (but excluding non-Christian religions) certain rights and privileges that the Catholic Church enjoys including performing legal marriages and receive state funds. However the bill has opposition both from the Catholic Church and the more secular and non-religious population although for different reasons, the Episcopal Conference fear it will affect the Catholic Church, whilst secularists advocate for an absolute secular state with no official religion at all. The bill has also been criticized for excluding the non-Christian religions and being tailor-made for the Evangelical Churches.

== Demographics ==
According to CID-Gallup surveys, in 2003 around 68% was Catholic, 17% was Protestants, 12% irreligious and 3% other religions. In November 2012, there were not any significant changes in religious affiliation, with the new demographics being 63% Catholic, 24% Protestant, 10% irreligious and other remain at 3% of population. Christian population growth from 85 to 87% in 2000's decade. Other surveys found gradual changes on religious affiliation after 2012.

The Latinobarómetro survey of 2017 found that 57% of the population identify themselves as Catholics, 25% are Protestants, 15% report that they do not have a religion, and 3% declare that they belong to another religion. A March 2018 survey by the Center for Investigations and Political Studies of the University of Costa Rica estimated that 52% of ticos were Catholic (72.8% in 2013), 22% Protestant (14.8% in 2013), 3.0% other religion (3.6% in 2013) and 17% had no religious affiliation (8.4% in 2013).

The 2021 poll by the University of Costa Rica noted a reduction in both Catholic and Evangelical practice reducing both to 47 and 19% respectively, with non-religious increasing from 17 to 27%. Traditional Protestants, Mormons, Jehovah's Witness and Muslims appear for the first time in polls with 1, 0.3, 0.2 and 0.1% respectively.

According to statistical studies done by the University of Costa Rica, among those over 55 Catholicism is more prominent, with 65% of this population considering themselves Catholic, followed by 19% evangelical and only 7% is without religion, among adults of 34 to 54 years Catholicism falls to 53%, while Protestantism rises to 24% and irreligion to 14%, and finally among young people aged 18 to 34 is where the number of irreligious is more prominent, being 27% and even surpassing the evangelicals that pass to 22% and the Catholics are reduced to 42%.

By sex, the Catholic population is equal between men and women in 52%, 26% of women are evangelical compared to 19% of men and conversely 19% of men left religion in front of 14% of women.

In terms of studies, 54% of the population with only complete primary education is Catholic, 26% Protestant and 11% without creed, 44% of those with complete secondary education are Catholic, followed by 23% evangelicals and 21% atheists/agnostics. Of those who have university studies 59% are Catholic, 22% agnostic/atheist and only 12% evangelical, so although Catholics are the majority in all academic degrees, evangelicals are more among those who have basic education and the irreligious among those who have higher education.

=== Social and political positions ===
A 2013-2014 study using focus groups divided in six stages; Practicing Catholics, non-Practicing Catholics, Irreligious, Historical Protestants, Neo-Pentecostal and "Others" (which included representatives from Islam, Baháʼí Faith, three branches of Buddhism –Tibetan, Zen and Nichiren-, Taoism, Brahma Kumaris and New Age) showed different position regarding moral, political and social issues.

Practicing Catholics, historical Protestants and neo-Pentecostals opposed abortion in almost all circumstances, even in cases of mother's life danger (although Protestants accepted it in such extremes circumstances with medical diagnosis and after praying), whilst non-practicing Catholics and Others were more open to different forms of abortion including for therapeutic reasons, pregnancy by rape (particularly in cases involving minors) and no extra uterine life possibility. Only non-religious were mostly in favor of free abortion on women's request.

Practicing Catholics and the two types of Protestants were much more morally and sexually conservative, frowning upon sex outside marriage and divorce. Protestants accepted divorcees but did not allow them to have high ranks in their churches whilst Catholics considered divorced couples as "couples under special circumstances". Non-practicing Catholics, non-religious and Others express full acceptance of divorcees. Practicing Catholics were the only group that opposed any kind of non-natural birth control. Practicing Catholics, Protestants and Evangelicals questioned the Ministry of Education's sex education programs fearing it lacked spiritual content and express support for abstinence-only education, all other groups supported the Ministry's sex education programs.

Both practicing Catholics and Protestants (both historic and neo-Pentecostal) consider homosexuality a sin and the product of a mental health problem that can be cured, whilst Irreligious, non-Practicing Catholics and Others were more supportive of LGBTI-rights, oppose discrimination and mostly consider it a natural condition.

All groups except irreligious expressed that the moral values of the candidate are important for their support during elections.

And finally, practicing Catholics, historical Protestants and neo-Pentecostals opposed laicism and reforming the Constitution to be a secular state supporting the Catholic Church as state religion. Despite the fact that neo-Pentecostals are not part of the state religion, they saw confessionalism as a protection against secularism which they consider a previous step before state atheism. Historical Protestants were less wary of laicism but prefer an official religion, however they express that Christianity should be the state religion and not Catholicism. Non-practicing Catholics, non-religious people and all the religious minorities express they support of the secular state.

== History ==
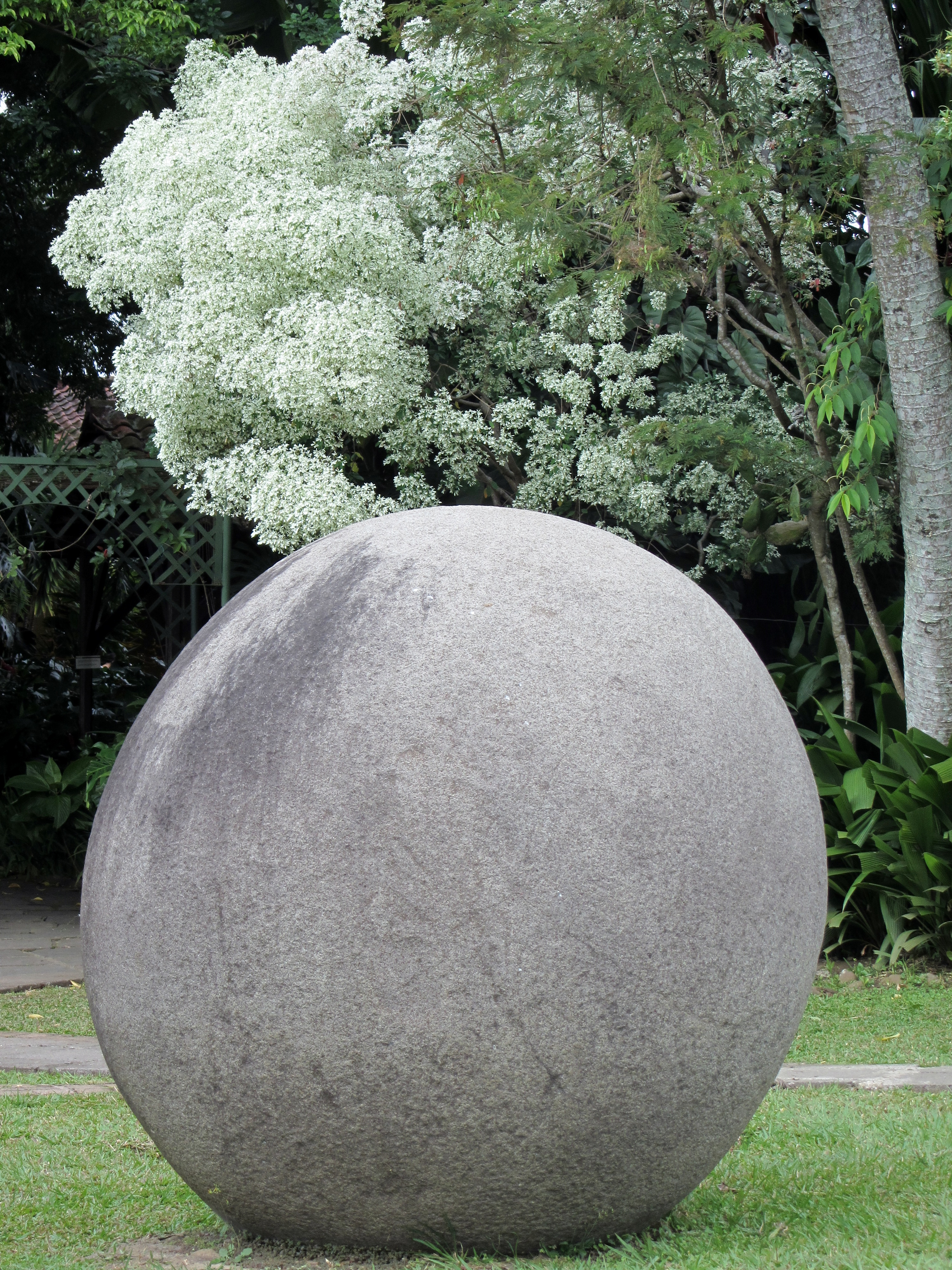
Sacred Stone spheres of Costa Rica

Pre-Columbian religions in what is today Costa Rica were mostly animistic, polytheistic and shamanistic. Shamans had an important cultural, societal and political role as well as a religious one. The main deity of the Bribri and Chorotega people is Sibö (creator god and culture hero) and as animistic religions they believe in nature spirits and elementals alongside a wide pantheon of gods. Shamans and healers are chosen according to the Bribri caste system and came from the same families.

The Nicoyans worshiped a trinity encompassed by the creator god Tipotani, the solar god Nembithía and the lunar goddess Ninguitamalí, however later northern influence mostly from the Mexicas made popular the Aztec deities and the practice of cannibalistic human sacrifices.

Several animals like the bat, the macaw, the jaguar, the crocodile and the serpent were consider sacred.

During colonial times the Catholic Church in Costa Rica did not have as much power and influence as in other parts of the Spanish Empire as Costa Rica was one of the poorer and more rural provinces, far from its local capital, thus the Catholic hierarchy had little interest in it. This may have shaped the political and cultural aspects of Costa Rica which may explain phenomenons such as the liberal hegemony and lack of conservative-liberal wars uncommon in Latin America.

After the independence of Central America, Costa Rica temporarily kept the Spanish Empire's Cadiz Constitution in place, with their articles about religion intact. Costa Rica's first constitution, the Pact of Concord established the Catholic religion as the one that "is and always would be" of the land and banned any other religion, except in the case of foreigners who were there for transit or commerce and who could practice their religion freely as far as they do not proselytize.

The 1825 Fundamental Law of the State of Costa Rica as part of the Federal Republic of Central America also established the state religion status of Catholicism but did not explicitly banned the rest. This was also established as such by the Federal Constitution, however this was reformed in 1835 at federal level granting freedom of religion and making the Central American Federation a secular state.

After leaving the Federal Republic and creating his own dictatorship Braulio Carrillo signs the Decree of Basis and Guarantees which works as a de facto constitution, and makes no mention of religion. In the next Constitution of 1844 after Honduran General Francisco Morazán took over the country and deposes Carrillo the Catholic church is declared state religion while granting religious freedom, status kept in all following constitutions.

However, Costa Rica's religious landscape was very uniform. Many Costa Rican settlers were newly converted or crypto-Jewish Sephardi Jews escaping Spain's Inquisition and expulsions, and some kept their practices secret. However, aside from secret Sephardim, some freethinkers of the liberal elite, and the indigenous religions kept in some isolated mountain and jungle areas like Talamanca, most Costa Ricans were Catholics.

The foundation of Freemasonry in Costa Rica in 1865 and the development of the liberal ideas that developed into the so-called Liberal State ruled by liberal groups like The Olympus, started to cause clashes with the Catholic Church. Secularizing measures such as the expulsion of the Jesuits and Bishop Bernard Thiel, the secularization of education and cemeteries, the closure of the Church-run Santo Tomas University, abolition of religious orders, legalization of divorce and civil marriage, etc., almost caused a civil war with the Catholic Church, however this was avoided thanks to the election of José Joaquín Rodríguez Zeledón and is celebrated as Costa Rica's Democracy Day. Costa Rica's first Theosophical Society is founded in 1902 by painter Tomás Povedano, turning popular among the intellectual elites and earning some important prestige. President Julio Acosta was a theosophist.

During late 19th and early 20th century, the religious diversity was increased by successive migratory waves of Polish Jews, Maronite Lebanese, Chinese Buddhists and Anglican Jamaicans. The migration of American, German, Swiss and British settlers brought large Lutheran communities.

During the early 20th century, the country was officially closed to non-White immigration as a presidential decree from president Ascensión Esquivel Ibarra of 1903 banned any immigration from Asians, Blacks, Gypsies, Arabs and Turks. This prohibition was lifted and successive migrations from Muslim, Hindu and Buddhist populations increased Costa Rica's religious diversity. The Polish Jews, almost all Ashkenazi, joined the already existent Sepharadim community but both communities kept themselves separate and, save some exception, did not mixed. Polish Jews suffered from antisemitic and xenophobic campaigns, especially in the press during their first migratory waves, especially at the hands of well known antisemitic presidents like Otilio Ulate Blanco (who slandered Jews on his newspaper) and León Cortés Castro who was sympathetic toward Nazism and Fascism and even named Max Effinger as migration director, who was the leader of the local Nazi Party/Foreign Organization chapter.

The breaking of the status quo of the to that point monolithic Liberal State started with the resurgence of the first left-wing workers' organization, many of them inspired by the Catholic social teaching. Costa Rica's first left-wing party, the Reformist Party was founded by priest Jorge Volio. Costa Rica's first labor union the Costa Rican Confederation of Workers "Rerum Novarum" was also Catholic and Christian socialist ideas influenced future president Rafael Ángel Calderón Guardia while he studied medicine in Belgium. Calderón in alliance with the Catholic Church (which included the taking back of many secularist laws including the authorization to form private religious schools) and the Communist Party of Costa Rica lead the social reformation known as the Social Guarantees and the new Reform State.

The Calderón Guardia administration in 1940 was more friendly toward Jews, especially after the war declaration on the Axis powers, nevertheless this also included the persecution of Germans, Italians and Japanese in Costa Rica who turn massively into the anti-Calderonista opposition. Calderon's successor Teodoro Picado Michalski (1944–1948) took back most of the antisemitic legislation and was also friendly toward the Jewish community, particularly because he was the son of a Polish immigrant. After the 1948 civil war with the victory of Ulate Blanco's supporters, the San José synagogue was attacked, as Jews were seen as pro-Calderón, however war caudillo José Figueres Ferrer (himself an agnostic) promised not to tolerate any anti-Jewish actions. During Figueres’ government the racial segregation that affected Blacks and Asians who could not vote, hold certain jobs, or get out of certain areas, was abolished thanks, among other things, to the "Curling Law" named after its author and also first Black Costa Rican deputy Alex Curling Delisser.

The Costa Rican religious diversity also expanded during late 20th and early 21st century with the arrival of alternative and new religious movements which included the Hare Krishna, Tibetan Buddhism, Baháʼí, Wicca, Neo-Druidism and Ásatrú faiths. In the early 21st century, the first groups of Luciferian set in the country with public activities and conferences including the Greater Church of Lucifer.

The 2018 Costa Rican general election put the subject of religion in a presidential campaign for the first time since 1889. After the ruling of the Inter-American Human Rights Court mandating the legalization of same-sex marriage in Costa Rica, neo-Pentecostal candidate Fabricio Alvarado (who called for disobeying the ruling) became a frontrunner in polls for the first time for a non-Catholic candidate, as a backlash from conservative voters against the ruling, causing at the same time that progressive and liberal voters supported young moderate Catholic Carlos Alvarado Quesada who supported same-sex marriage, Church-state separation and other secularizing measures. Among other controversial subjects like "gender ideology", abortion, and even anti-Catholic statements made by Fabricio Alvarado's pastor and mentor, the election was won in the second round by Carlos Alvarado. The election was often described as a "religious shock".

== Religious presence ==
=== Christianity ===
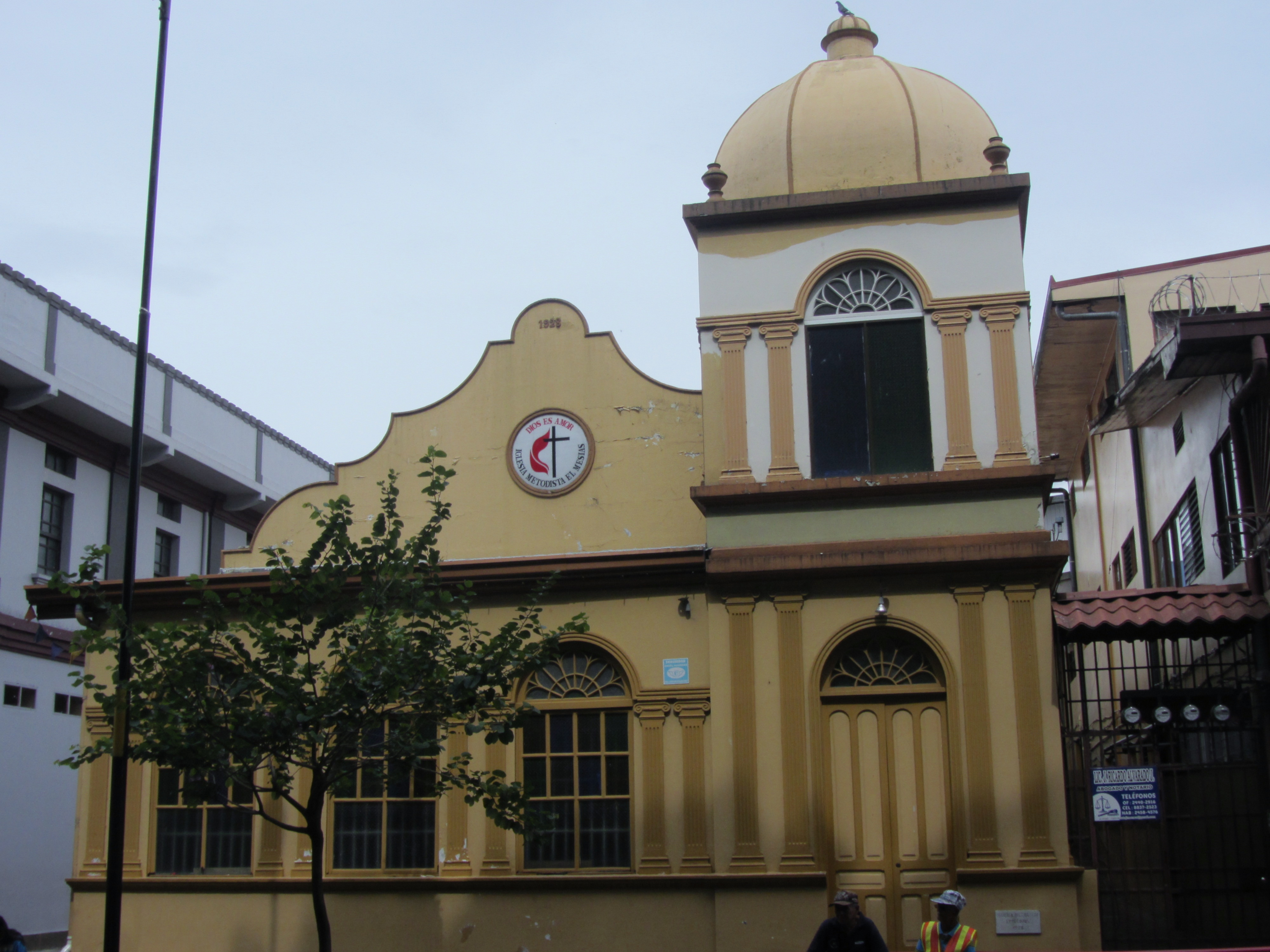
Methodist Church in Alajuela.

While the Catholic church is still the largest church body, the Protestants are growing, in 2017 representing 15% of the population. Most Protestants are Pentecostal with smaller numbers of Lutherans and Baptists. The Church of Jesus Christ of Latter-day Saints (Mormons) claims 50,000 members. and has a temple in San Jose that serves as a regional worship center for Costa Rica, Panama, Nicaragua, and Honduras.

Quakers escaping compulsory draft from the Korean War founded a colony in Monteverde in 1950, the Amish founded a community in San Carlos in 1968 and the first Lutheran Church was founded in 1965. Anglicanism was brought by both British and Black Jamaicans and it has some 12,000 followers mostly in Limón Province, however, its see is the Good Shepherd Church in San José. There is also a Russian Orthodox Church led by Orthodox priest Georgy Kaplanov located in the Vazquez de Coronado Canton for the small Orthodox community working not only for the Russian community but also for other Orthodox including Greeks and Romanians.

Although they represent less than 1 percent of the population, Jehovah's Witnesses have a strong presence on the Caribbean coast. In the past, the Seventh-day Adventists have operated a university that attracts students from throughout the Caribbean Basin and the Unification Church has maintained its continental headquarters for Latin America in San Jose. This article incorporates text from this source, which is in the public domain.</ref>

=== Non-religious ===
People without religious affiliation have also grown substantially in Costa Rican society; in 2011 people who declared themselves atheists, agnostics or "without religion" represented about 13% of the total population, 2% and 11% respectively. In 2017 the number rose to 18% approximately plus 2% that are "undeclared". The study of the School of Mathematics of the University of Costa Rica estimated that in 1988 only 3.5% of Costa Ricans had no affiliation (including atheists and agnostics), however, that figure has grown slowly but steadily since then. One of its organizations is the Costa Rican Association of Secular Humanists who filed a lawsuit in 2009 within the Supreme Electoral Tribunal for the political belligerence of then Archbishop José Francisco Ulloa for his homily of September 2009, which urged not to vote for candidates who "deny to God and defend principles that go against life, against marriage and against the family", to which the Court in May 2010 ruled in favor of the plaintiffs finding that the bishop contravened Article 28 of the Constitution ordering him to abstain on electoral issues. There are also organized groups of pastafarians in Costa Rica.

=== Buddhism ===
Buddhism is the largest non-Christian religion with around 100,000 members, mostly amongst the Asian community, but with some converts.

Buddhism entered the country for the first time thanks to the Theosophical Society spreading Buddhist ideas among the intellectual elite. Chinese Buddhism was brought into the country by Chinese migrants alongside Chinese folk religion. Many of them converted to Catholicism but reports of Buddhist practices among the Chinese community in early 20th century exists.

The first main Buddhist organization was the Zen House of Costa Rica, based in Zen Buddhism and funded by the Japanese government in 1974. Located in Santo Domingo de Heredia. Tibetan Buddhism was first introduced by the Tibetan-Costa Rican Cultural Center founded soon after the first visit of the Dalai Lama in 1989. This center belongs to the Gelug lineage of Tibetan Buddhism. In 2010 a Diamond Way Buddhism center (of the Kagyu tradition of Tibetan Buddhism) was founded in San Jose, followed by another one in San Mateo, Orotina in 2022. Currently all four traditional Tibetan schools and Bon have centers in the country. There are also Theravada, Shao Lin and Soka Gakkai centers.

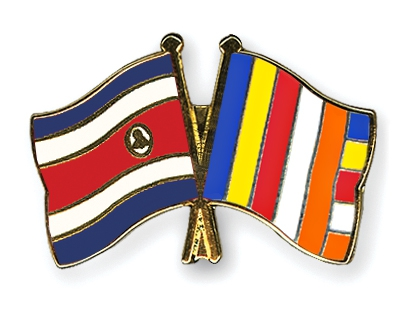
Buddhist-Costa Rican flags

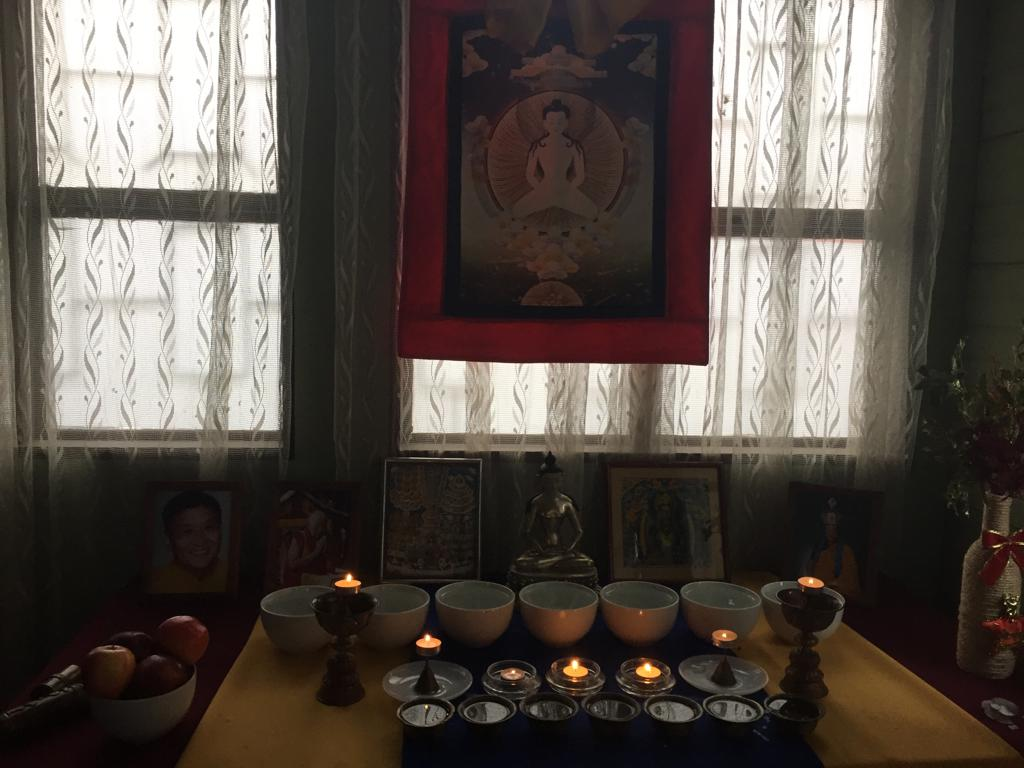
Tibetan Buddhist altar in Costa Rica

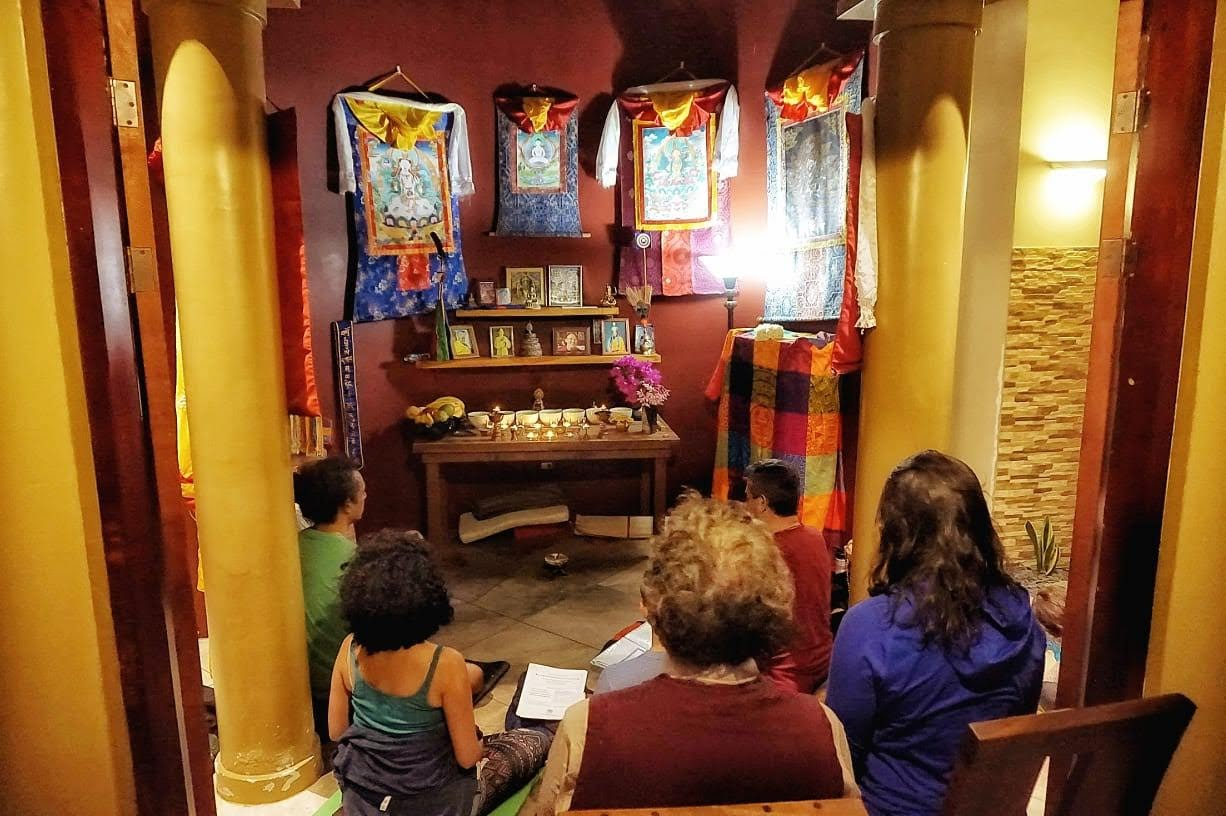
Bon family in Costa Rica

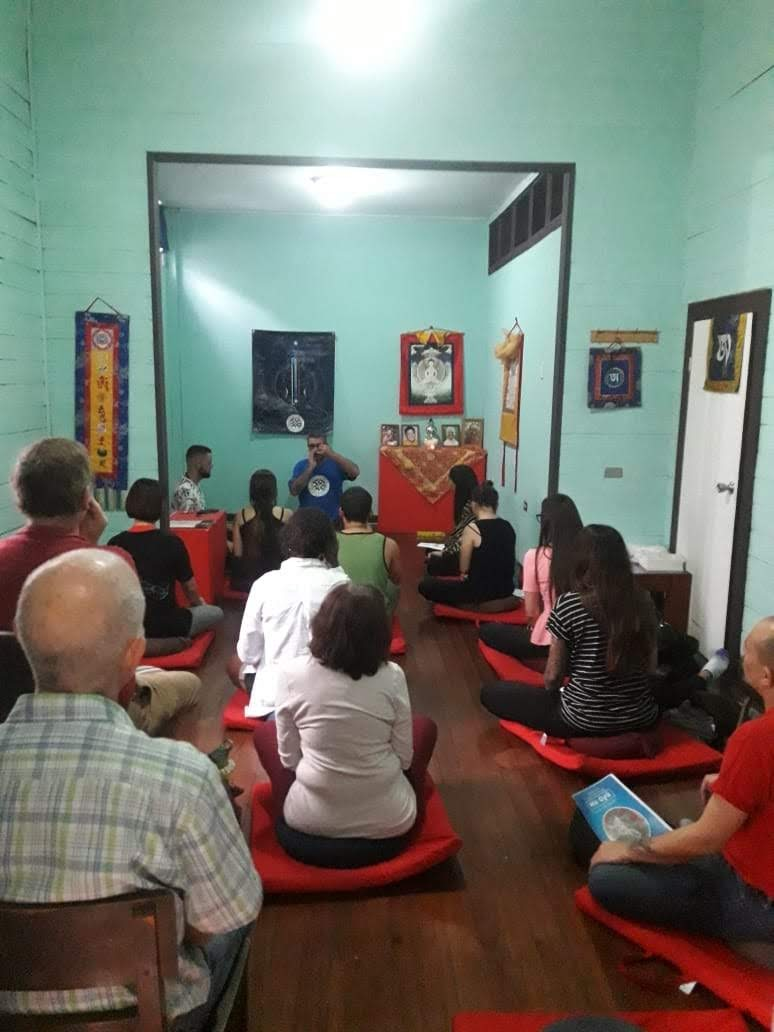
Buddhist practitioners in Costa Rica

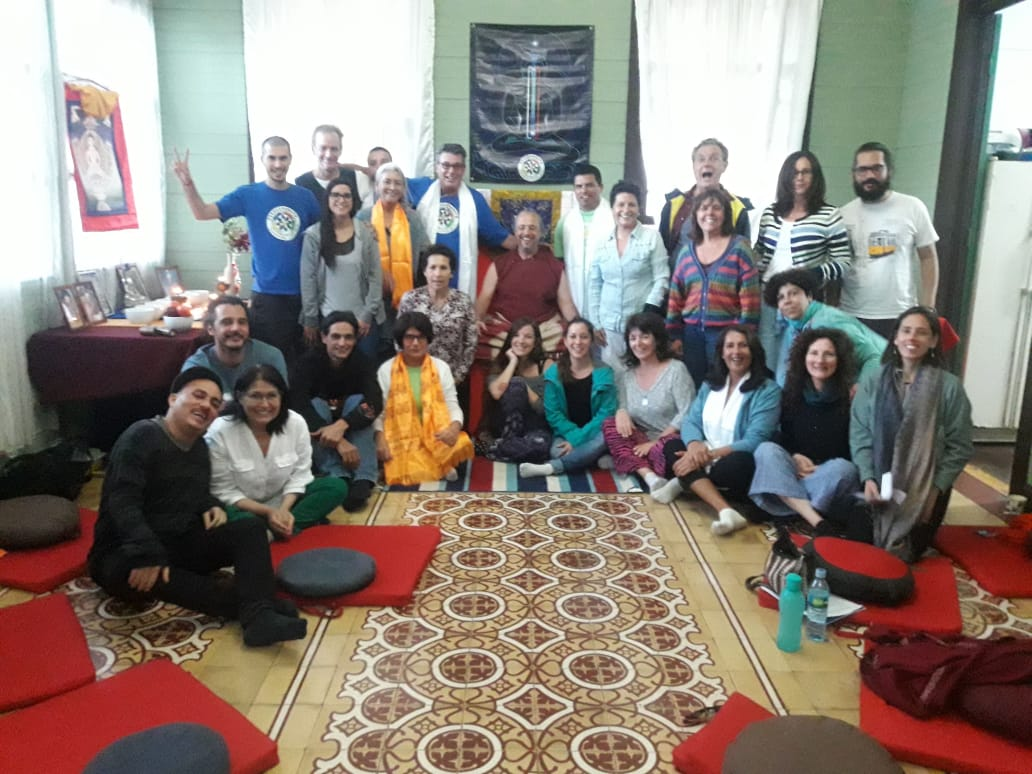
Spiritual retreat in Costa Rica

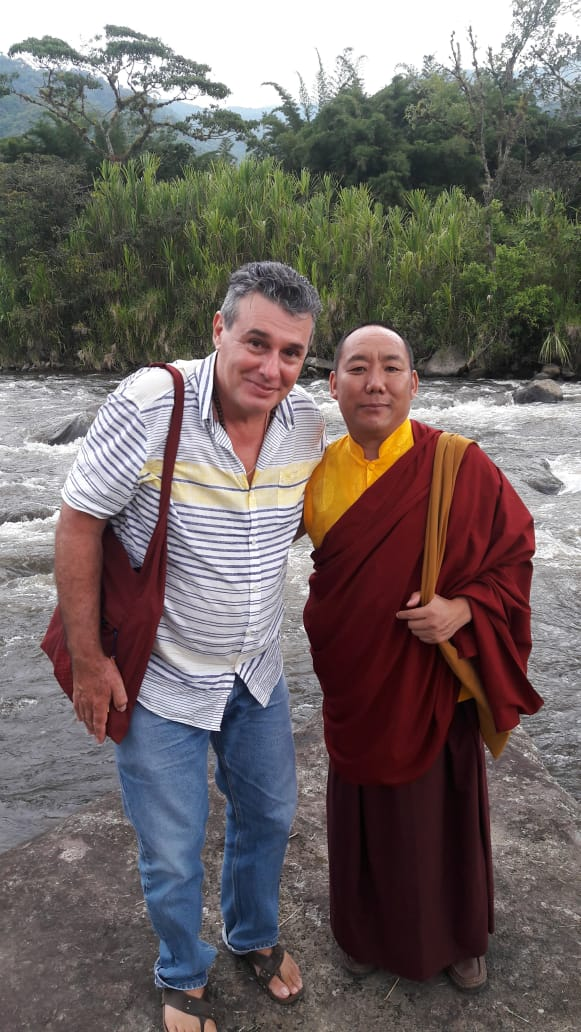
Tibetan lama alongside local practitioner in the Orosi River

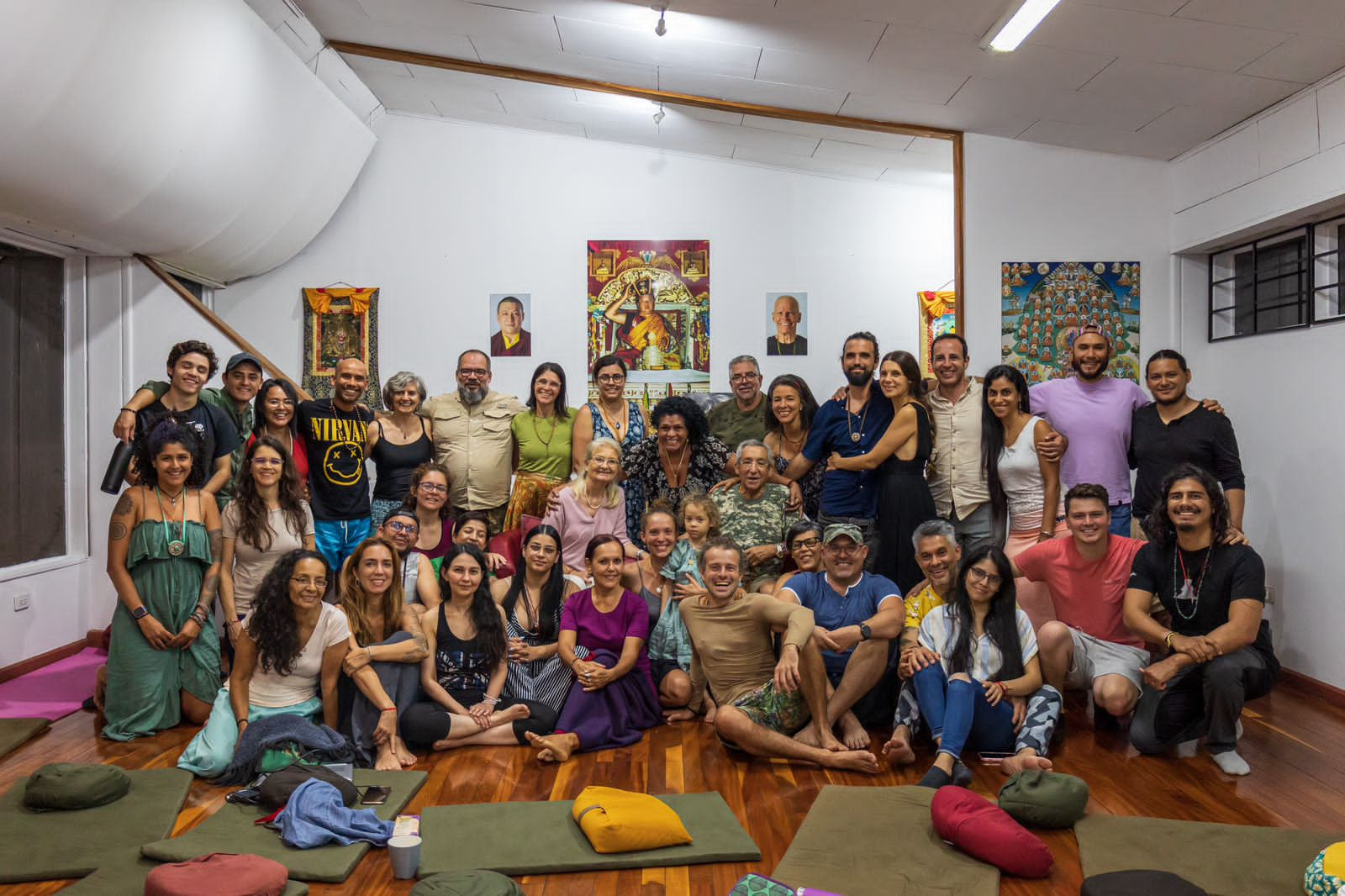
Diamond Way Buddhism practitioners posing in front of an altar

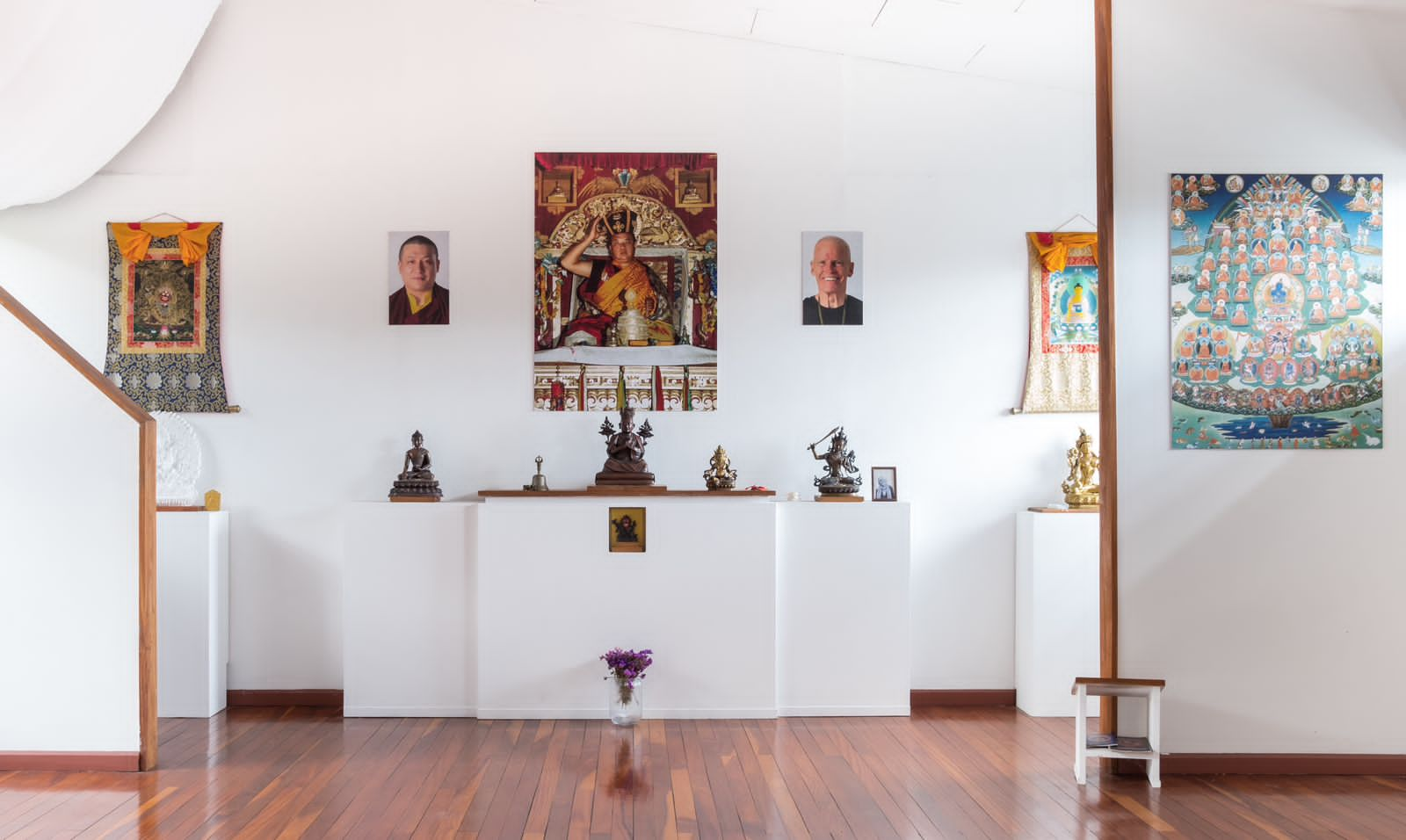
Diamond Way Buddhism altar in San Jose, Costa Rica

=== Judaism ===
It is estimated that were between 2300 and 3500 Jews in the country in 2022. Jewish people have an important cultural and social input, and many ministers, deputies, and three Vice Presidents have been Jewish.

Most Costa Rican Jews are Orthodox, with the Zionist Israelite Center located in San José city as their main synagogue, presided over by Chief Rabbi of Costa Rica Gershon Miletzki, the B'nei Israel synagogue of Reform Judaism located near La Sabana, San José led by rabbis Rami Pavolotzky and Daniela Szuster (married couple) officiates for the Reform community, there is also a Keshet Holistic Studies Institute affiliated to the Walking Stick Foundation led by rabbis Gershon Winkler and Miriam Maron, and an ultra-Orthodox Chabad Lubavitch synagogue led by rabbi Hersch Spaltzer. The community also has a museum, a B'nai B'rith lodge and a private school, the Jaim Weizman Institute.

=== Islam ===
The number of Costa Rican Muslims is of around 1500 people, mostly Sunni Muslims and some 100 are converts. There are three mosques in Costa Rica; the Mosque of Omar located in the Goicoechea Canton which also acts as the Muslim Cultural Center founded in 2002, the Light and Faith Mosque located in downtown San José near the Central Market (also Sunni), and the Sahar Islamic Center in La Sabana which acts as the Shiite Mosque (previously Shiites gathered in a private home or assisted the Sunni mosque). Ahmadiya Muslims also have a center in Costa Rica. The Muslim Cultural Center is presided by Palestinian-born medic Abdul Sasa and its sheikh is the Egyptian-born Omar Abdel Aziz.

=== Hinduism ===
Although there are Orthodox Hindus among the Indian and South East Asian migrant community, including a Hindu Temple in Monteverde, most Costa Ricans (particularly those converts) belong to the Hare Krishna movement. There are three Hare Krishna centers in Costa Rica: the Nueva Goloka Vrindavan located in a Cartago farm founded in 1986 which split from ISKCON, the ISKCON center in San José, and the Gaudiya Math center also in San José.

The first community made by ISKCON devotees was found in Cartago in 1986; however, internal fighting that even brought media coverage caused the group to split with the ISKCON-related faction founding a new temple in San José. The Gaudiya Math group never had relations with ISCKON and rents the first floor of the Theosophical Society's building. There is also a Brahma Kumaris temple and Sathya Sai Baba movement centers.

According to ARDA, there were approximately 440 (0.01%) Hindus in Costa Rica in 2020.

=== Neo-Paganism ===
The number of Neo-Pagans is calculated at around 2000 individuals. Neo-Pagan groups organized several annual festival and cultural activities. The most popular traditions are Wicca and Ásatrú.

=== Other ===
Other religious communities in the country include: Baháʼís, Jains, Luciferians, Rastafari, Sikhs, Taoists, and Tenrikyo. The Church of Scientology also has a presence in Costa Rica.

Many indigenous people continue to practice traditional beliefs in animism.

== Freedom of religion ==
Article 75 of the Costa Rican Constitution states that the "Catholic, Apostolic, and Roman Religion is the official religion of the Republic." That same article provides for freedom of religion, and the government generally respects this right in practice. Religious groups with at least ten members may register with the government in order to be able to raise funds and own property. There is no penalty for not being registered, other than a lack of access to these privileges.

Religious marriage ceremonies other than those conducted by the Catholic Church are not recognized by the government. Couples married through such ceremonies must also obtain a civil union from a public notary in order to have their marriage legally recognized.

The government provides funding to private religious schools regardless of religion.

In 2023, the country was scored 4 out of 4 for religious freedom.

== See also ==
- Buddhism in Costa Rica
- Catholic Church in Costa Rica
- Demographics of Costa Rica
- Islam in Costa Rica
- Protestantism in Costa Rica
- Religion in Latin America
