= Reformation (disambiguation) =

The Reformation, also known as the Protestant Reformation, was the 16th century schism within Western Christianity initiated by Martin Luther, John Calvin, and others

Reformation may also refer to:

== Religious movements ==
- Movements connected to the Protestant Reformation:
  - English Reformation, series of events in 16th century England by which the church in England broke away from the authority of the Pope and the Roman Catholic Church
  - Icelandic Reformation, King Christian III of Denmark's imposition of Lutheranism, in the middle of the 16th century
  - Reformation in Denmark–Norway and Holstein, the 16th century transition to Lutheranism in the realms ruled by the Copenhagen-based House of Oldenburg
  - Reformation in Switzerland, the Protestant Reformation in Switzerland, during the 1520s
  - Scottish Reformation, part of the wider Protestant Reformation, in 1560
  - Swedish Reformation, the Protestant reformation in Sweden, in 1527
- Radical Reformation, an Anabaptist movement concurrent with the Magisterial Protestant Reformation
- Counter-Reformation (also known as the Catholic Reformation), the period of Catholic revival beginning with the Council of Trent, in response to the Protestant Reformation
- Evening Light Reformation, part of the holiness movement that led to the formation of the Church of God (Anderson, Indiana)
- Liberalism and progressivism within Islam (also known as Islamic Reformation), a variety of movements to reform Islam in the 20th and 21st centuries
- Mormon Reformation, a movement in Utah Territory in 1856–57

== Arts, entertainment, and media ==
=== Literature ===
- The Reformation, the sixth volume of The Story of Civilization by Will and Ariel Durant, focusing on the Protestant Reformation
- The Reformation: A History, by English historian Diarmaid MacCulloch

=== Music ===
- Reformation (Kiuas album), 2006
- Reformation (Spandau Ballet album), 2002
- Symphony No. 5 (Mendelssohn), also called the Reformation Symphony, commemorating the Protestant Reformation
- Zach Williams & The Reformation, a Southern rock band from Arkansas
- "Reformation", a 1981 song by Spandau Ballet from their album Journeys to Glory

=== Other uses in arts, entertainment, and media ===
- Reformation (2015 film), a melodramatic neo-noir, directed by Hoyon Jung
- Reformation (journal), a peer-reviewed academic journal sponsored by the Tyndale Society, publishing scholarship relating to the Reformation era
- "Reformation" (The Wire), a 2004 episode of the television series The Wire

== Other uses ==
- Bohemian Reformation (also known as the Czech Reformation or Hussite Reformation)
- Reformation, a term commonly used in the United States for the Rectification (law) of a written contract or legal instrument
- Post-Suharto era or period of Reformasi (Reform), the (current) era in Indonesia following the 1997 Asian financial crisis and the fall of Suharto, characterized by increased freedom and political participation
- Reformation of hydrocarbons in chemistry, see Catalytic reforming

== See also ==
- Reconstruction (disambiguation)
- Reform (disambiguation)
- Reformasi (disambiguation)
- Reformation Day, a religious holiday celebrated on October 31 in remembrance of the Protestant Reformation
- Reformation Wall, a monument to the Protestant Reformation in Geneva, Switzerland
