= State religion =

Religion or creed endorsed by the state

Confessional states Buddhism Christianity (unspecified) Protestantism Catholic Church Eastern Orthodox Church Islam (unspecified) Sunni Islam Shia Islam (Twelver)

A state religion (also called official religion) is a religion or creed officially endorsed by a sovereign state. A state with an official religion (also known as a confessional state), while not a secular state, is not necessarily a theocracy. State religions are subject to advantageous treatment by official or government-sanctioned establishments of them, ranging from incentivising citizens to recognise and practise them through government endorsement to having public spending on the maintenance of religious property and clergy be unrestricted, but the state does not need to be under the legislative control of the clergy as it would be in a theocracy. Generally, these religions have more rights and fewer restrictions in the country than other religions in a country.

Official religions have been known throughout human history in almost all types of cultures, reaching into the Ancient Near East and prehistory. The relation of religious cult and the state was discussed by the ancient Latin scholar Marcus Terentius Varro, under the term of theologia civilis (lit. 'civic theology'). The first state-sponsored Christian denomination was the Armenian Apostolic Church, established in 301 AD. In Christianity, as the term church is typically applied to a place of worship for Christians or organizations incorporating such ones, the term state church is associated with Christianity as sanctioned by the government, historically the state church of the Roman Empire in the last centuries of the Empire's existence, and is sometimes used to denote a specific modern national branch of Christianity. Closely related to state churches are ecclesiae, which are similar but carry a more minor connotation.

In the Middle East, the majority of states with a predominantly Muslim population have Islam as their official religion, though the degree of religious restrictions on citizens' everyday lives varies by country. Rulers of Saudi Arabia use religious power, while Iran's secular presidents are supposed to follow the decisions of religious authorities since the 1979 Islamic Revolution. Turkey, which also has Muslim-majority population, became a secular country after Atatürk's Reforms, although unlike the Russian Revolution of the same time period, it did not result in the adoption of state atheism.

The degree to which an official national religion is imposed upon citizens by the state in contemporary society varies considerably; from high as in Saudi Arabia and Iran, to none at all as in Greenland, Denmark, England, Iceland, and Greece (in Europe, the state religion might be called in English, the established church).

== Types ==
The degree and nature of state backing for denomination or creed designated as a state religion can vary. It can range from mere endorsement (with or without financial support) with freedom for other faiths to practice, to prohibiting any competing religious body from operating and to persecuting the followers of other sects. In Europe, competition between Catholic and Protestant denominations for state sponsorship in the 16th century evolved the principle Cuius regio, eius religio (states follow the religion of the ruler) embodied in the text of the treaty that marked the Peace of Augsburg in 1555. In England, Henry VIII broke with Rome in 1534, being declared the Supreme Head of the Church of England. (Note: The headship was administrative and jurisdictional but did not include the potestas ordinis (the right to preach, ordain, administer the sacraments and rites of the Church which were reserved to the clergy).) The official religion of England continued to be "Catholicism without the Pope" until after his death in 1547.

In some cases, an administrative region may sponsor and fund a set of religious denominations; such is the case in Alsace-Moselle in France under its local law, following the pre-1905 French concordatory legal system and patterns in Germany.

=== State churches ===
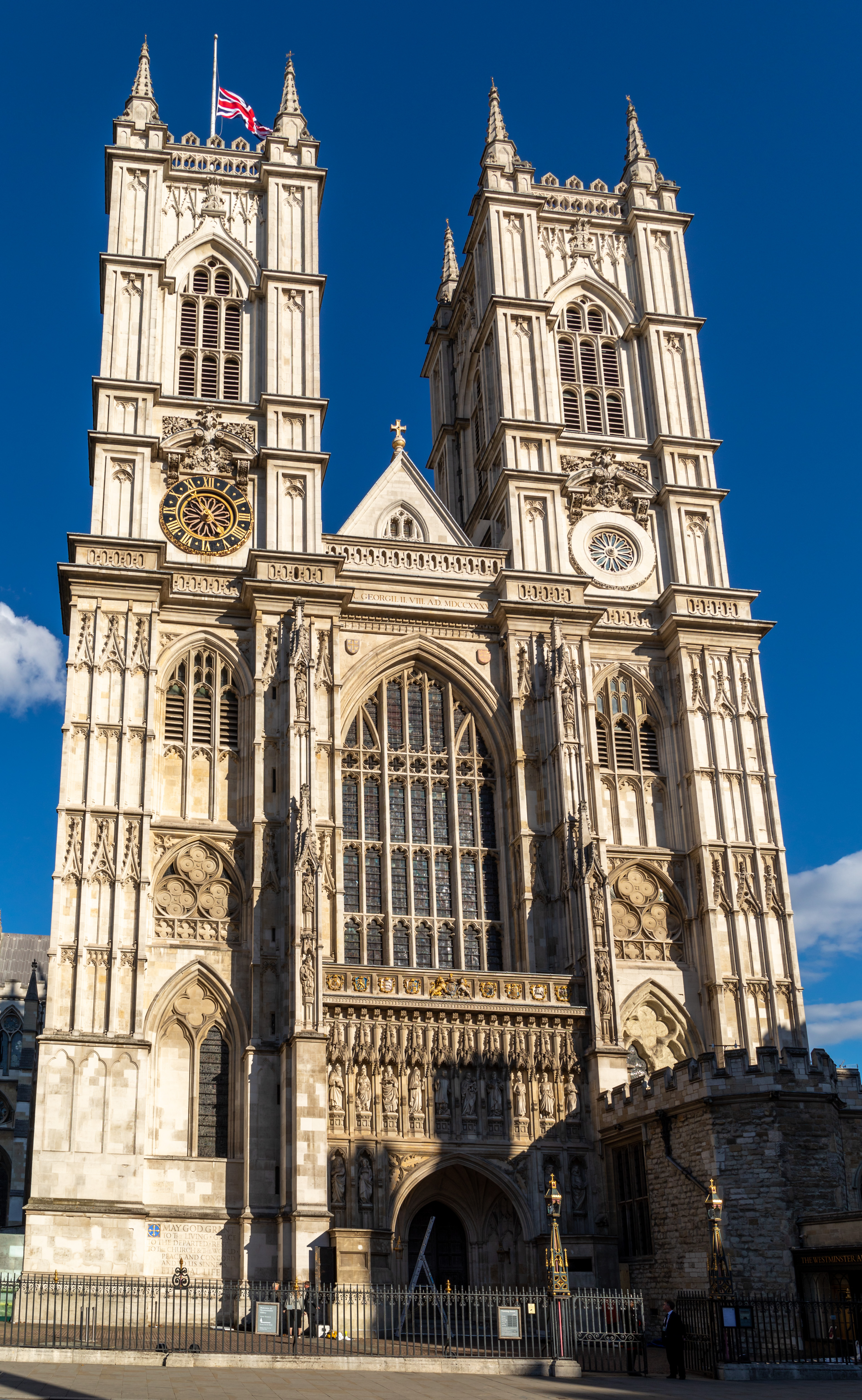
Westminster Abbey is responsible directly to the British monarch. The Church of England is the established church in England.

A state church (or "established church") is a state religion established by a state for use exclusively by that state. In the case of a state church, the state has absolute control over the church, but in the case of a state religion, the church is ruled by an exterior body; for example, in the case of Catholicism, the Vatican has control over the church.

=== Disestablishment ===
Disestablishment is the process of repealing a church's status as an organ of the state. In a state where an established church is in place, opposition to such a move may be described as antidisestablishmentarianism.

== Current states with a state religion ==
=== Buddhism ===
Governments where Buddhism, either a specific form of it, or Buddhism as a whole, has been established as an official religion:

- Bhutan: The Constitution of Bhutan defines Tibetan Buddhism as the "spiritual heritage of Bhutan". The Constitution is based on Buddhist philosophy. It also mandates that the Druk Gyalpo (King) should appoint the Je Khenpo and Dratshang Lhentshog (The Commission for Monastic Affairs).
- Cambodia: The Constitution declared Theravada Buddhism as the official religion of the country. About 98% of Cambodia's population is Buddhist.
- Sri Lanka: The constitution of Sri Lanka states under Chapter II, Article 9, "The Republic of Sri Lanka shall give to Buddhism the foremost place and accordingly it shall be the duty of the State to protect and foster the Buddha Sasana, while assuring to all religions the rights granted by Articles 10 and 14(1)(e)".

In some countries, Buddhism is not recognized as a state religion, but holds special status:

- Thailand: Article 67 of the Constitution of Thailand states: The State should support and protect Buddhism [...] In supporting and protecting Buddhism, [...] the State should promote and support education and dissemination of dharmic principles of Theravada Buddhism [...], and shall have measures and mechanisms to prevent Buddhism from being undermined in any form. The State should also encourage Buddhists to participate in implementing such measures or mechanisms.
- Laos: According to the Constitution of Laos, Buddhism is given special privilege in the country. The state respects and protects all the lawful activities of Buddhism.
- Myanmar: Section 361 of the Constitution states that "The Union recognizes the special position of Theravada Buddhism as the faith professed by the great majority of the citizens of the Union." The 1961 State Religion Promotion and Support Act, which required the government to teach Buddhist lessons in schools, to give priority to Buddhist monasteries in founding of primary schools, to make Uposatha days holidays during Vassa months, to broadcast Buddhist sermons by State media on Uposatha days, and otherwise promote and support Buddhism as State Religion, was repealed following the 1962 military coup, along with the 1947 Constitution. The 1974 Constitution and the current 2008 Constitution did not restore an official state religion. Instead, the 2008 Constitution recognizes the "special position" of Theravada Buddhism as the faith of the majority of the population while not establishing it as the state religion.
- Kalmykia (Russia): The Kalmyk local government supports Tibetan Buddhism and also encourages Buddhist teachings and traditions. It also builds various Buddhist temples and sites. Various efforts are taken by the Government for the revival of Tibetan Buddhism in the republic.

=== Christianity ===
The following states recognize some form of Christianity as their state or official religion or recognize a special status for it (by denomination):

==== Non-denominational Christianity ====
- Papua New Guinea: On 12 March 2025, Parliament voted to amend the Constitution of Papua New Guinea to include in its preamble the words "[We] acknowledge and declare God, the Father; Jesus Christ, the Son; and Holy Spirit, as our Creator and Sustainer of the entire universe and the source of our powers and authorities, delegated to the people and all persons within the geographical jurisdiction of Papua New Guinea."
- Samoa: In June 2017, Parliament voted to amend the wording of Article 1 of the constitution, thereby making Christianity the state religion. Part 1, Section (1)(3) reads "Samoa is a Christian nation founded on God the Father, the Son and the Holy Spirit." The status of the religion had previously only been mentioned in the preamble, which Prime Minister Tuilaʻepa Saʻilele Malielegaoi considered legally inadequate.
- Zambia: The preamble to the Zambian Constitution of 1991 declares Zambia to be "a Christian nation", while also guaranteeing freedom of religion.

==== Catholicism ====
Jurisdictions where Catholicism has been established as a state or official religion:

- Costa Rica: Article 75 of the Constitution of Costa Rica confirms that "The Catholic and Apostolic Religion is the religion of the State, which contributes to its maintenance, without preventing the free exercise in the Republic of other forms of worship that are not opposed to universal morality or good customs."
- Vatican City: It is an elective, theocratic (or episcopal), absolute monarchy ruled by the pope, who is also the Vicar of Christ. The highest state functionaries are all Catholic clergy of various national origins. It is the sovereign territory of the Holy See (Latin: Sancta Sedes) and the location of the Pope's official residence, referred to as the Apostolic Palace.
- Liechtenstein: The Constitution of Liechtenstein describes the Catholic Church as the state religion and enjoying "the full protection of the State". The constitution does however ensure that people of other faiths "shall be entitled to practice their creeds and to hold religious services to the extent consistent with morality and public order".
- Malta: Article 2 of the Constitution of Malta declares that "the religion of Malta is the Catholic and Apostolic Religion".
- Monaco: Article 9 of the Constitution of Monaco describes the "Catholic, and apostolic religion" as the religion of the state.

Jurisdictions that give various degrees of recognition in their constitutions to Roman Catholicism without establishing it as the State religion:

- Andorra: The Constitution of Andorra allows the Roman Catholic Church to practice freely and openly, and keeps a special relationship between the Church and the government, based on tradition. It also recognizes the Church’s organizations as legal entities, according to their own rules. The government appoints the Roman Catholic Bishop of Urgell, based in Catalonia, Spain, as one of two heads of state, alongside the President of France. Following the revised Education Law of April 2022, the Constitution bans the use of conspicuous religious symbols in public schools and is an attempt to secularize public education.
- Argentina: Article 2 of the Constitution of Argentina explicitly states that the government supports the Roman Catholic Apostolic Faith, but the constitution does not establish a state religion. Before its 1994 amendment, the Constitution stated that the President of the Republic must be a Roman Catholic.
- El Salvador: Although Article 3 of the Constitution of El Salvador states that "no restrictions shall be established that are based on differences of nationality, race, sex or religion", Article 26 states that the state recognizes the Catholic Church and gives it legal preference.
- Guatemala: The Constitution of Guatemala recognises the juridical personality of the Catholic Church. Other churches, cults, entities, and associations of religious character will obtain the recognition of their juridical personality in accordance with the rules of their institution.
- Italy: The Constitution of Italy does not establish a state religion, but recognizes the state and the Catholic Church as "independent and sovereign, each within its own sphere". The Constitution additionally reserves to the Catholic faith singular position in regard to the organization of worship, as opposed to all other confessions.
- Panama: The Constitution of Panama recognizes Catholicism as "the religion of the majority" of citizens but does not designate it as the official state religion.
- Paraguay: The Constitution of Paraguay recognizes the Catholic Church's role in the nation's historical and cultural formation.
- Peru: The Constitution of Peru recognizes the Catholic Church as an important element in the historical, cultural, and moral formation of Peru and lends it its cooperation.
- Poland: The Constitution of Poland states that "The relations between the Republic of Poland and the Roman Catholic Church shall be determined by international treaty concluded with the Holy See, and by statute."
- Spain: The Constitution of Spain of 1978 abolished Catholicism as the official state religion, while recognizing the role it plays in Spanish society. The State allocates the 0.7% of the personal income tax corresponding to taxpayers who express their will to support the Catholic Church.
- Timor-Leste: While the Constitution of Timor-Leste enshrines the principles of freedom of religion and separation of church and state in Section 45 Comma 1, it also acknowledges "the participation of the Catholic Church in the process of national liberation" in its preamble (although this has no legal value).

==== Eastern Orthodoxy ====
The following state recognizes some form of Eastern Orthodoxy as their state or official religion:

- Greece: The Church of Greece is recognized by the Greek Constitution as the prevailing religion in Greece. However, this provision does not give exclusivity of worship to the Church of Greece, while all other religions are recognized as equal and may be practiced freely.

The jurisdictions below give various degrees of recognition in their constitutions to Eastern Orthodoxy, but without establishing it as the state religion:

- Bulgaria: In the Bulgarian Constitution, Eastern Orthodoxy is recognized as "the traditional religion" of the Bulgarian people, but the state itself remains secular.
- Cyprus: The Constitution of Cyprus states: "The Autocephalous Greek-Orthodox Church of Cyprus shall continue to have the exclusive right of regulating and administering its own internal affairs and property in accordance with the Holy Canons and its Charter in force for the time being and the Greek Communal Chamber shall not act inconsistently with such right." (Note: The Constitution also states that "Any matter relating to divorce, judicial separation or restitution of conjugal rights or to family relations of the members of the Greek-Orthodox Church, shall be cognizable by family courts each of which is composed: For a divorce trial, of three judges, one of which is a lawyer ecclesiastical officer appointed by the Greek Orthodox Church and presides over the Court and the other two of high professional and moral standard belonging to the Greek Orthodox Church are appointed by the Supreme Court among lawyers. If no ecclesiastical officer is appointed as above, the Supreme Court appoints the President of the Court as well.")
- Finland: Both the Finnish Orthodox Church and the Evangelical Lutheran Church of Finland have judicial ties to the state, even if the Orthodox church has a minority status across the population.
- Georgia: The Georgian Orthodox Church has a constitutional agreement with the state, the constitution recognizing "the special role of the Apostolic Autocephalous Orthodox Church of Georgia in the history of Georgia and its independence from the state". (See also Concordat of 2002)

==== Protestantism ====
The following states recognize some form of Protestantism as their state or official religion:

==== The Commonwealth ====
===== Anglicanism =====
The Anglican Church of England is the established church in England as well as all three of the Crown Dependencies:

- England: The Church of England is the established church in England, but not in the United Kingdom as a whole. It is the only established Anglican church worldwide. The Anglican Church in Wales, the Scottish Episcopal Church and the Church of Ireland are not established churches and they are independent of the Church of England. The British monarch is the titular Supreme Governor of the Church of England. The 26 most senior bishops in the Church of England are Lords Spiritual and have seats in the House of Lords of the Parliament of the United Kingdom.
- Guernsey: The Church of England is the established church in the Bailiwick of Guernsey, and the leader of the Church of England in the territory is the Dean of Guernsey.
- Isle of Man: The Church of England is the established church on the Isle of Man. The Bishop of Sodor and Man is an ex officio member of the Legislative Council (the upper house of Tynwald).
- Jersey: The Church of England is the established church in Jersey, and the leader of the church on the island is the Dean of Jersey, a non-voting member of the States of Jersey.

===== Calvinism =====
- Scotland: The Church of Scotland is the national church, but not of the United Kingdom as a whole. While it is the national church, it 'is not State controlled' and the monarch is not the 'supreme governor' as in the Church of England.
- Tuvalu: The Church of Tuvalu is the state religion, although in practice this merely entitles it to "the privilege of performing special services on major national events". The Constitution of Tuvalu guarantees freedom of religion, including the freedom to practice, the freedom to change religion, the right not to receive religious instruction at school or to attend religious ceremonies at school, and the right not to "take an oath or make an affirmation that is contrary to his religion or belief".

==== Nordic countries ====
===== Lutheranism =====
Jurisdictions where a Lutheran church has been fully or partially established as a state recognized religion include the Nordic States.

- Denmark: Section 4 of the Constitution of Denmark confirms the Church of Denmark as the established church.
  - Faroe Islands: The Church of the Faroe Islands is the state church of the Faroe Islands, an autonomous administrative division within the Danish Realm.
  - Greenland: The Church of Denmark is the state church of Greenland, an autonomous administrative division within the Danish Realm.
- Iceland: The Constitution of Iceland confirms the Church of Iceland as the state church of Iceland.

Jurisdictions that give various degrees of recognition in their constitutions to Lutheranism without establishing it as the state religion:

- Finland: The Evangelical Lutheran Church of Finland has a special relationship with the Finnish state, its internal structure being described in a special law, the Church Act. The Church Act can be amended only by a decision of the synod of the Evangelical Lutheran Church and subsequent ratification by the Parliament of Finland. The Church Act is protected by the Constitution of Finland and the state cannot change the Church Act without changing the constitution. The church has the power to tax its members. The state collects these taxes for the church, for a fee. On the other hand, the church is required to give a burial place for everyone in its graveyards. The President of Finland also decides the themes for intercession days. The church does not consider itself a state church, as the Finnish state does not have the power to influence its internal workings or its theology, although it has a veto in those changes of the internal structure which require changing the Church Act. Neither does the Finnish state accord any precedence to Lutherans or the Lutheran faith in its own acts.
- Norway: Until 2012, the Church of Norway was not a separate legal entity from the government. It was disestablished and became a national church, a legally distinct entity from the state with special constitutional status. The King of Norway is required by the Constitution to be a member of the Church of Norway, and the church is regulated by special canon law, unlike other religions.
- Sweden: The Church of Sweden was the state church of Sweden between 1527 (when King Gustav Vasa broke all ties with Rome) and 2000 when the state officially became secular. The Church does have a special relation to the Swedish state unlike any other religious organizations. For example, there is a special law that regulates certain aspects of the church and the members of the royal family are required to belong to it in order to have a claim to the line of succession. A majority of the population still belongs to the Church of Sweden.

==== Other/mixed ====
- Armenia: The Armenian Orthodox Church has a constitutional agreement with the State: "The Republic of Armenia shall recognise the exclusive mission of the Armenian Orthodox Holy Church, as a national church, in the spiritual life of the Armenian people, in the development of their national culture and preservation of their national identity."
- Dominican Republic: The constitution of the Dominican Republic specifies that there is no state church and provides for freedom of religion and belief. A concordat with the Holy See designates Catholicism as the official religion and extends special privileges to the Catholic Church not granted to other religious groups. These include the legal recognition of church law, use of public funds to underwrite some church expenses, and complete exoneration from customs duties.
- Haiti: While Catholicism has not been the state religion since 1987, a 19th-century concordat with the Holy See continues to confer preferential treatment to the Catholic Church, in the form of stipends for clergy and financial support to churches and religious schools. The Catholic Church also retains the right to appoint certain amounts of clergy in Haiti without the government's consent.
- Hungary: The preamble to the Hungarian Constitution of 2011 describes Hungary as "part of Christian Europe" and acknowledges "the role of Christianity in preserving nationhood", while Article VII provides that "the State shall cooperate with the Churches for community goals." However, the constitution also guarantees freedom of religion and separation of church and state.
- Nicaragua: The Nicaraguan Constitution of 1987 states that the country has no official religion, but defines "Christian values" as one of the "principles of the Nicaraguan nation".
- Portugal: Although Church and State are formally separate, the Catholic Church in Portugal still receives certain privileges.

=== Islam ===
Many Muslim-majority countries have constitutionally established Islam, or a specific form of it, as a state religion. Proselytism (converting people away from Islam) is often illegal in such states except Bangladesh.

- Afghanistan: Officially, Afghanistan has continuously been an Islamic state under various constitutions since at least 1987. Since 2021, the Taliban has made Sunni Islam according to the Hanafi school official, and has discriminated systematically against the Shia minority.
- Algeria: "Islam shall be the religion of the State."
- Bahrain: "The religion of the State is Islam."
- Bangladesh: Article (2A) of the Constitution of Bangladesh declares: "The state religion of the Republic is Islam, but the State shall ensure equal status and equal right in the practice of the Hindu, Buddhist, Christian and other religions."
- Brunei: Article 3 of the Constitution of Brunei: "The official religion of Brunei Darussalam shall be the Islamic Religion ..."
- Djibouti: Article 1 of the Constitution of Djibouti: "Islam is the Religion of the State." The Apostasy in Islam is completely legal.
- Egypt: Article 2 of the Egyptian Constitution of 2014: "Islam is the religion of the State".
- Iran: Article 12 of the Constitution of Iran: "The official religion of Iran is Islam and the Twelver Ja'fari school [in usul al-Dîn and fiqh], and this principle will remain eternally immutable." Islam has been Iran's state religion since 1501 dating back to the Safavid dynasty and has continued ever since, excluding the period of breaks in the Pahlavi dynasty.
- Iraq: Article 2 of the Constitution of Iraq: "Islam is the official religion of the State and is a foundation source of legislation ..."
- Jordan: Article 2 of the Constitution of Jordan: "Islam is the religion of the State and Arabic is its official language."
- Kuwait: Article 2 of the Constitution of Kuwait: "The religion of the State is Islam and Islamic Law shall be a main source of legislation."
- Libya: Article 1 of the Libyan interim Constitutional Declaration: "Islam is the Religion of the State and the principal source of legislation is Islamic Jurisprudence (Shari'a)."
- Malaysia: Article 3 of the Federal Constitution of Malaysia: "Islam is the religion of the Federation; but other religions may be practised in peace and harmony in any part of the Federation."
- Maldives: Article 10 of the Maldives's Constitution of 2008: "The religion of the State of the Maldives is Islam. Islam shall be the[sic] one of the bases of all the laws of the Maldives."
- Mauritania: Article 5 of the Constitution of Mauritania: "Islam is the religion of the people and of the State."
- Morocco: Article 3 of the Constitution of Morocco: "Islam is the religion of the State, which guarantees to all the free exercise of beliefs [cultes]."
- Oman: Article 2 of the Constitution of Oman: "The religion of the State is Islam and Islamic Sharia is the basis for legislation."
- Pakistan: Article 2 of the Constitution of Pakistan: "Islam shall be the State religion of Pakistan."
- Palestine: Article 4 of the Basic Law of the State of Palestine: "Islam is the official religion in Palestine. Respect and sanctity of all other heavenly religions shall be maintained."
- Qatar: Article 1 of the Constitution of Qatar: "Qatar is an independent sovereign Arab State. Its religion is Islam and Shari'a law shall be a main source of its legislations."
- Saudi Arabia: Article 1 of the Basic Law of Saudi Arabia: "The Kingdom of Saudi Arabia is a sovereign Arab Islamic State. Its religion is Islam."
- Sahrawi Arab Democratic Republic: Article 2 of the Constitution of the Sahrawi Arab Democratic Republic declares that Islam is the state religion and law origin.
- Somalia: Article 2 of the Provisional Constitution of the Federal Republic of Somalia: "Islam is the religion of the State."
- United Arab Emirates: Article 7 of the Constitution of the United Arab Emirates: "Islam shall be the official religion of the Union."
- Yemen: Article 2 of the Constitution of Yemen: "Islam is the religion of the state, and Arabic is its official language."

==== Other/mixed ====
In some countries, Islam is not recognized as a state religion, but holds special status:

- Syria: The Constitutional Declaration of the Syrian Arab Republic carries much of the same context of religion as prior constitutions, albeit with a slight wording change regarding the influence of Islamic jurisprudence on legislation. The new constitution however does not explicitly designate a State Religion in the same way as various other Middle Eastern countries do. Article 3 states "The religion of the President of the Republic is Islam; Islamic jurisprudence is the principal source of legislation.
- Tajikistan: Although there is a separation of religion from politics, certain aspects of law also privilege Islam. One such law declares "Islam to be a traditional religion of Tajikistan, with more rights and privileges given to Islamic organizations than to religious groups of non-Muslim origin".
- Tunisia: Article 5 of the Constitution declares that "Tunisia is part of the Muslim world, and the state alone must work to achieve the goals of pure Islam in preserving honourable life of religious freedom". Islam has been given special privileges by the Constitution, though it is no longer the state religion.
- Turkmenistan: The Constitution claims to uphold a secular system in which religious and state institutions are separate. However, in Turkmenistan, the state actively privileges a form of traditional Islam. The culture, including Islam, is a key facet, contributes to the Turkmen national identity. The state encourages the conceptualization of "Turkmen Islam".
- Uzbekistan: Since independence, Islam has taken on an altogether new role in the nation-building process in Uzbekistan. The government affords Islam in special status and declared it as a national heritage and a moral guideline.

=== Judaism ===
- Israel: Since the Proclamation of Israeli independence in 1948, Israel is defined in several of its laws as a "Jewish and democratic state" (Hebrew: מדינה יהודית ודמוקרטית, romanized: medina yehudit ve-demokratit). However, the term "Jewish" is a polyseme that can describe the Jewish people as either an ethnic or a religious group. The debate about the meaning of the term "Jewish" and its legal and social applications is one of the most profound issues with which Israeli society deals. The problem of the status of religion in Israel, even though it is relevant to all religions, usually refers to the status of Judaism in Israeli society. Thus, even though from a constitutional point of view Judaism is not the state religion in Israel, its status nevertheless determines relations between religion and state and the extent to which religion influences the political center. The Law of Return, passed on 5 July 1950, gives the global Jewish diaspora the right to relocate to Israel and acquire Israeli citizenship. Section - (1) of that law declares that "Every Jew has the right to come to this country as an Oleh ['immigrant']." In the Law of Return, the State of Israel gave effect to the Zionist movement's "credo" which called for the establishment of Israel as a Sovereign Jewish state with Democratic setups, ideals and values. The State of Israel supports religious institutions, particularly Orthodox Jewish ones, and recognizes the "religious communities" as carried over from those recognized under the British Mandate—in turn derived from the pre-1917 Ottoman system of millets. These are Jewish and Christian (Eastern Orthodox, Latin Catholic, Gregorian-Armenian, Armenian-Catholic, Syriac Catholic, Chaldean, Melkite Catholic, Maronite Catholic, and Syriac Orthodox). The fact that the Muslim population was not defined as a religious community does not affect the rights of the Muslim community to practice their faith. At the end of the period covered by the 2009 U.S. International Religious Freedom Report, several of these denominations were pending official government recognition; however, the Government has allowed adherents of not officially recognized groups the freedom to practice. In 1961, legislation gave Muslim Shari'a courts exclusive jurisdiction in matters of personal status. Three additional religious communities have subsequently been recognized by Israeli law: the Druze (prior under Islamic jurisdiction), the Evangelical Episcopal Church, and followers of the Baháʼí Faith.

=== Political religions ===
In some countries, there is a political ideology sponsored by the government that may be called political religion.

=== Multiple religion recognition ===
- China: The government of China officially espouses state atheism, and officially recognizes only five religions: Buddhism, Taoism, Islam, Christianity (Catholicism and Protestantism). Despite limitations on certain forms of religious expression and assembly, religion is not banned, and religious freedom is nominally protected under the Chinese constitution. Among the general Chinese population there is a wide variety of religious practices. The Chinese government's attitude to religion is one of skepticism and non-promotion.
- France: The local law in Alsace-Moselle accords official status to four religions in this specific region of France: Judaism, Roman Catholicism, Lutheranism and Calvinism. The law is a remnant of the Napoleonic Concordat of 1801, which was abrogated in the rest of France by the law of 1905 on the separation of church and state. However, at the time, Alsace-Moselle had been annexed by Germany. The Concordat, therefore, remained in force in these areas, and it was not abrogated when France regained control of the region in 1918. Therefore, the separation of church and state, part of the French concept of Laïcité, does not apply in this region.
- Indonesia is officially a presidential republic and a unitary state that does not declare or designate a state religion. Officially, the government recognizes six religions: Islam, Protestantism, Catholicism, Buddhism, Hinduism, and Confucianism, as well as traditional and indigenous beliefs. Pancasila comes from the Jakarta Charter whose first article was changed from "Divinity, with the obligation to carry out Islamic law for its adherents" to "the One Divinity", to respect other religions. The Constitution of Indonesia guarantees freedom of religion and the practice of other religions and beliefs, including traditional animistic beliefs. Atheism, although not prosecuted, is discouraged by the state ideology of Pancasila. In addition, the province of Aceh receives a special status and a higher degree of autonomy, in which it may enact laws (qanuns) based on the Sharia and enforce it to its Muslim residents.
- Lebanon: There are 18 officially recognized religious groups in Lebanon, each with its own family law legislation and set of religious courts. Under the terms of an agreement known as the National Pact between the various political and religious leaders of Lebanon, the president of the country must be a Maronite, the Prime Minister must be a Sunni, the Speaker of Parliament must be a Shia, and the Deputy Prime Minister must be Greek Orthodox.
- Luxembourg is a secular state, but the Grand Duchy recognizes and supports several denominations, including the Catholic Church, Greek Orthodox, Russian Orthodox, Romanian Orthodox, Serbian Orthodox, Anglican and some Protestant denominations as well as to Jewish congregations.
- Nepal is a secular nation, and secularism in Nepal under the interim constitution (Part 1, Article 4) is defined as "religious and cultural freedom, along with the protection of religion and culture handed down from time immemorial". That is, "the state government is bound for protecting and fostering Hindu religion" while maintaining "religious" and "cultural" freedom throughout the nation as fundamental rights.
- Russia: Though a secular state under the constitution, Russia is often said to have Russian Orthodoxy as the de facto national religion, despite other minorities: "The Russian Orthodox Church is de facto privileged religion of the state, claiming the right to decide which other religions or denominations are to be granted the right of registration". Islam in Russia is recognized under the law and by Russian political leaders as one of Russia's traditional religions, Islam is a part of Russian historical heritage, and is subsidized by the Russian government. The position of Islam as a major Russian religion, alongside Orthodox Christianity, dates from the time of Catherine the Great, who sponsored Islamic clerics and scholarship through the Orenburg Assembly.
- Singapore is officially a secular country and does not have a state religion, and has been named in one study as the "most religiously diverse nation in the world", with no religious group forming a majority. However, the government gives official recognition to twelve different religions, namely Buddhism, Confucianism, Christianity, Islam, Hinduism, Taoism, Sikhism, Shintoism, Judaism, Zoroastrianism, Jainism, and the Baháʼí Faith, and Singapore's penal code explicitly prohibits "wounding religious feelings". The Jehovah's Witnesses and Unification Church are also banned in Singapore, as the government deems them to be a threat to national security.
- Switzerland is officially secular at the federal level but 24 of the 26 cantons support both the Swiss Reformed Church and the Roman Catholic Church in various ways.
- Turkey: Turkey is officially a secular country. None of the past and the latest constitutions recognizes an official religion nor promotes any. But; the Directorate of Religious Affairs, an official state institution established by Mustafa Kemal Atatürk in 1924, expresses opinions only on religious matters regarding Sunni institutions. The directorate regulates the operation of the country's hundreds of thousands of registered mosques and employs local and provincial imams (who are civil servants) who are appointed and paid by the state, whilst other sects of Islam with a sizeable minority such as Alevism are not being regulated nor being funded by the directorate. In addition, the Treaty of Lausanne explicitly guarantees the security and protection of both Greek and Armenian Orthodox Christian minorities and the Turkish-Jews. Their religious institutions are recognized officially by the state.
- Vietnam is officially atheist (although sometimes also referred as atheist-Buddhist), but recognizes only 38 religious organizations and one dharma practice.

== Current state-sanctioned religious bodies ==
Note: Some secular states have bodies (such as ministries or offices within these) that recognize multiple religions, while others lack such bodies but recognize specific religions within their territory, and others are simply indifferent to the matter. Secular states do not have an official religion and typically recognize more than one religious institution (in some cases, dozens) operating within their borders, appearing in more than one category in the table below.

State-sanctioned religious bodies
Country	Religion	Body	Effective head	Titular head
Buddhism
Bhutan	Tibetan Buddhist (Drukpa Kagyu)	Dratshang Lhentshog	Je Khenpo	King
Cambodia	Buddhist (Theravada)	Supreme Sangha of Cambodia	Supreme Patriarch	
China	Buddhist	Buddhist Association of China	President	
Indonesia	Buddhist	All-Indonesia Federation of Buddhist Organizations (Walubi)	Chairman	
Indonesia	Buddhist	Indonesian Buddhist Association (Permabudhi)	Chairman	
Laos	Buddhist (Theravada)	Lao United Buddhists Association	President	
Myanmar	Buddhist (Theravada)	State Samgha Maha Nayaka Committee	Chairman	
Russia	Buddhist (Mahayana)	Buddhist Traditional Sangha of Russia	Pandito Khambo Lama	
Sri Lanka	Buddhist (Theravada)	Ministry of Buddha Sasana, Religious and Cultural Affairs	Minister	
Thailand	Buddhist (Theravada)	Sangha Supreme Council	Supreme Patriarch	King
Christianity
Albania	Catholic	Episcopal Conference of Albania	Pope	
Albania	Eastern Orthodoxy	Albanian Orthodox Church	Archbishop	
Andorra	Catholic	Spanish Episcopal Conference	Pope	
Argentina	Catholic	Episcopal Conference of Argentina	Pope	
Armenia	Oriental Orthodox	Armenian Apostolic Church	Catholicos	
Belarus	Eastern Orthodox (de facto)	Belarusian Orthodox Church	Metropolitan	Patriarch
Belgium (Note: Belgium is a secular state and also recognizes Judaism, Eastern Orthodox Christianity, and Islam.)	Catholic	Episcopal Conference of Belgium	Pope	
Belgium	Protestant	Administrative Council of Protestant and Evangelical Religion in Belgium	Co-presidents	
Belgium	Anglican	Archdeaconry of North West Europe	Bishop	
Bosnia and Herzegovina	Catholic	Episcopal Conference of Bosnia and Herzegovina	Pope	
Bosnia and Herzegovina	Eastern Orthodox	Serbian Orthodox Church	Patriarch	
Bulgaria	Eastern Orthodox	Bulgarian Orthodox Church	Patriarch	
Burkina Faso	Catholic	Episcopal Conference of Burkina Faso and Niger	Pope	
Burkina Faso	Protestant	Federation of Protestant Churches and Missions	President	
Chad	Catholic	Episcopal Conference of Chad	Pope	
Chad	Protestant	Alliance of Evangelical Churches and Missions in Chad	General Secretary	
Costa Rica	Catholic	Episcopal Conference of Costa Rica	Pope	
China	Catholic	Chinese Catholic Patriotic Association	President	Pope
China	Protestant	Three-Self Patriotic Movement	Secretary-general	Chairperson
Democratic Republic of the Congo	Catholic	National Episcopal Conference of the Democratic Republic of the Congo	Pope	
Democratic Republic of the Congo	Kimbanguist	Church of Jesus Christ on Earth	Spiritual head	
Democratic Republic of the Congo	Protestant	Church of Christ in the Congo	Bishop	
Democratic Republic of the Congo	Mormon	The Church of Jesus Christ of Latter-day Saints	President	
Cyprus	Anglican	Diocese of Cyprus and the Gulf	President Bishop	
Cyprus	Catholic	Conference of the Latin Bishops of the Arab Regions	Pope	
Cyprus	Catholic	Maronite Catholic Church	Patriarch	Pope
Cyprus	Eastern Orthodox	Church of Cyprus	Primate	
Cyprus	Oriental Orthodox	Armenian Apostolic Church	Catholicos	
Denmark	Protestant (Lutheran)			
Denmark	Protestant (Lutheran)	Church of Denmark	Primate	King
Denmark	Protestant (Lutheran)	Church of the Faroe Islands	Bishop	King
Dominican Republic	Catholic	Episcopal Conference of the Dominican Republic	Pope	
El Salvador (Note: El Salvador is a secular state and recognizes religions other than Catholicism; however, the Catholic Church—despite not being part of the state—is the only one mentioned by name in the country's constitution, while other state-recognized religions operate similarly to NGOs.)	Catholic	Episcopal Conference of El Salvador	Pope	
England	Anglican	Church of England	Archbishop	King
Equatorial Guinea (Note: Equatorial Guinea is a secular state, but the country's government favors two Christian churches, exempting them from the requirement to register their organizations or activities with the Ministry of Justice, Religious Affairs, and Penitentiary Institutions.)	Catholic	Episcopal Conference of Equatorial Guinea	Pope	
Equatorial Guinea	Protestant (Reformed)	Reformed Presbyterian Church of Equatorial Guinea	General Secretary	Moderator
Eritrea	Catholic	Catholic Bishops' Conference of Ethiopia and Eritrea	Pope	
Eritrea	Oriental Orthodox	Eritrean Orthodox Tewahedo Church	Patriarch	
Eritrea	Protestant (Lutheran)	Evangelical Lutheran Church of Eritrea	General Secretary	President
Finland (Note: Finland is a secular state, although not part of the State, the latter recognizes two Christian churches with which it maintains judicial and legal ties. Other religions (Catholicism, Judaism, Islam, Hinduism, etc) are recognized by the State and freely practiced.)	Eastern Orthodoxy	Orthodox Church of Finland	Archbishop	Patriarch
Finland	Protestant (Lutheran)	Evangelical Lutheran Church of Finland	Archbishop	
Georgia	Eastern Orthodox	Georgian Orthodox Church	Catholicos-Patriarch	
Greece	Eastern Orthodoxy (Greek Orthodox)	Church of Greece	Archbishop	
Iceland	Protestant (Lutheran)	Church of Iceland	Bishop	
Indonesia	Catholic	Bishops' Conference of Indonesia	Pope	
Indonesia	Protestant	Communion of Churches in Indonesia	General Secretary	Chairman
Kazakhstan	Eastern Orthodox	Kazakhstan Metropolitan District of the Russian Orthodox Church	Patriarch	
Latvia (Note: Latvia is a secular state. The state recognizes eight religious denominations (seven Christian and one Jewish) and grants them legal privileges, exemptions from standard registration rules, and seats on the Ecclesiastical Council—an advisory body consulted by the Prime Minister on church-state matters. Other religions (Buddhism, Hinduism, Islam, etc) are recognized by the State and freely practiced.)	Catholic	Latvian Bishops' Conference	Pope	
Latvia	Eastern Orthodox	Latvian Orthodox Church	Metropolitan	Patriarch (de jure)
Latvia	Eastern Orthodox	Central Council of the Pomorian Old-Orthodox Church of Latvia	Chairman	
Latvia	Protestant (Adventist)	Latvian Conference of the Seventh-day Adventist Church	President	
Latvia	Protestant (Baptist)	Union of Baptist Churches in Latvia]	Bishop	
Latvia	Protestant (Lutheran)	Evangelical Lutheran Church of Latvia	Archbishop	
Latvia	Protestant (Methodist)	Latvian United Methodist Church	Superintendent	Bishop
Lebanon	Catholic	Conference of the Latin Bishops of the Arab Regions	Pope	
Lebanon	Catholic	Antiochene Syriac Maronite Church	Patriarch	Pope
Lebanon	Catholic	Melkite Greek Catholic Church	Patriarch	Pope
Lebanon	Catholic	Armenian Catholic Church	Patriarch	Pope
Lebanon	Catholic	Syriac Catholic Church	Patriarch	Pope
Lebanon	Catholic	Chaldean Catholic Church	Patriarch	Pope
Lebanon	East Syriac	Assyrian Church of the East	Catholicos-Patriarch	
Lebanon	Eastern Orthodox	Greek Orthodox Patriarchate of Antioch and All the East	Patriarch	
Lebanon	Oriental Orthodox	Armenian Apostolic Church	Catholicos	
Lebanon	Oriental Orthodox	Coptic Orthodox Church	Pope	
Lebanon	Oriental Orthodox	Syriac Orthodox Church	Patriarch	
Lebanon	Protestant	Supreme Council of the Evangelical Community in Syria and Lebanon	President	
Liechtenstein	Catholic	Archdiocese of Vaduz	Pope	
Lithuania	Catholic	Lithuanian Bishops' Conference	Pope	
Lithuania	Catholic	Ukrainian Greek Catholic Church	Major Archbishop	Pope
Lithuania	Eastern Orthodox	Russian Orthodox Diocese of Lithuania	Bishop	Patriarch
Lithuania	Eastern Orthodox	Supreme Council of the Pomorian Old-Orthodox Church of Lithuania	Chairman	
Lithuania	Protestant (Lutheran)	Evangelical Lutheran Church in Lithuania	Bishop	
Lithuania	Protestant (Reformed)	Lithuanian Evangelical Reformed Church	General Superintendent	President of the Consistory
Lithuania	Protestant (Baptist)	Evangelical Baptist Union of Lithuania	General Secretary	President
Lithuania	Protestant (Adventist)	Seventh-day Adventist Church	President	
Lithuania	Protestant (Methodist)	United Methodist Church	Secretary	President
Lithuania	Protestant (Pentecostal)	The Union of Christians of Evangelical Faith of Lithuania	Bishop	
Malta	Catholic	Maltese Episcopal Conference	Pope	
Monaco	Catholic	Archdiocese of Monaco	Pope	
Norway	Protestant (Lutheran)	Church of Norway	Preses	
Russia	Eastern Orthodox (de facto)	Russian Orthodox Church	Patriarch	
Sweden	Protestant (Lutheran)	Church of Sweden	Archbishop	
Tonga	Protestant (Methodist)	Free Wesleyan Church of Tonga	President	
Tuvalu	Protestant (Reformed)	Church of Tuvalu	President	
Vatican City	Catholic	Diocese of Rome	Pope	
Confucianism
Indonesia	Confucianism	Supreme Council for the Confucian Religion in Indonesia	Chairperson	
Druzism
Lebanon	Druzism	Mishyakhat al-Aql	Shaykh al-Aql	
Hinduism
India (Note: India is a secular state with no official religion. There is no federal-level body that sanctions Hindu religious institutions; at the state level, there are bodies that oversee the secular and financial administration of Hindu temples. The country officially recognizes and grants freedom of belief to six religious minorities: Muslims, Sikhs, Christians, Buddhists, Jains, and Parsis.)	Hinduism	Tamil Nadu Hindu Religious and Charitable Endowments Department	Minister	
India	Hinduism	Karnataka Muzrai Department	Minister	
India	Hinduism	Tirumala Tirupati Devasthanams	Executive officer	Chairman
India	Hinduism	Travancore & Cochin Devaswom Boards	President	
India	Hinduism	Shri Jagannath Temple Administration	Chief administrator	Chairman
Indonesia	Hinduism	Parisada Hindu Dharma Indonesia	General Secretary	Chairman
Islam
Afghanistan	Sunni Islam (Hanafi)	Council of Ulema	Supreme Leader (Amir al-Mu'minin)	
Albania	Sunni Islam	Muslim Community of Albania	Grand Mufti	
Albania	Bektashi Islam	World Headquarters of the Bektashi	Dedebaba	
Algeria	Islam	Supreme Islamic Council	President	
Bahrain	Islam	Supreme Council for Islamic Affairs	Chairman	King
Bangladesh	Islam	Ministry of Religious Affairs	Minister	
Bosnia and Herzegovina	Islam	Islamic Community in Bosnia and Hezergovina	Grand Mufti	
Brunei	Sunni Islam	State Mufti		Sultan
Burkina Faso	Islam	Muslim Community of Burkina Faso	President	
Chad	Islam	High Council for Islamic Affairs	Grand Imam of N'Djamena	
China	Islam	Islamic Association of China	President	
Comoros	Islam	Supreme National Institution	Grand Mufti	
Comoros	Islam	Council of Ulema	Grand Mufti	
Democratic Republic of the Congo	Islam	Islamic Community of the Democratic Republic of the Congo	Grand Mufti	
Cyprus	Islam	Cyprus Foundations Administration (Vakf)	Director General	
Djibouti	Sunni Islam	Ministry of Islamic Affairs, Culture and Endowments	Minister	
Egypt	Islam	Dar al-Ifta al-Misriyyah	Grand Mufti	
Eritrea	Islam	Higher Assembly of Eritrean Eftae and Islamic Affairs	Grand Mufti	
India	Islam	Central Waqf Council	Chairperson	
Indonesia	Islam	Indonesian Ulama Council	Chairman	
Iran	Shia Islam (Twelver)	Supreme Leader		
Iraq	Sunni Islam	Grand Mufti		
Iraq	Shia Islam	Hawza of Najaf	Grand Ayatollah	
Jordan	Islam	General Iftaa' Department	Grand Mufti	King
Kazakhstan	Islam	Spiritual Administration of Muslims of Kazakhstan	Supreme Mufti	
Kuwait	Islam	Ministry of Awqaf and Islamic Affairs	Minister	Emir
Kyrgyzstan (Note: Kyrgyzstan is a secular state; in addition to Islam, the country recognizes other religions—such as Christianity and Judaism—and allows freedom of belief for these faiths.)	Islam	Spiritual Administration of Muslims of Kyrgyzstan	Grand Mufti	
Lebanon	Alawite Islam	Islamic Alawite Supreme Council	President	
Lebanon	Isma'ili Islam	Aga Khan		
Lebanon	Sunni Islam	Dar al-Fatwa	Grand Mufti	
Lebanon	Shia Islam	Supreme Islamic Shia Council	President	
Libya	Islam	General Authority for Endowments and Islamic Affairs	Grand Mufti	
Lithuania	Islam	Spiritual Center of Sunni Muslims of Lithuania – Muftiate	Mufti	
Lithuania	Islam	Council of Muslim Religious Communities of Lithuania – Muftiate	Mufti	
Malaysia	Sunni Islam	Conference of Rulers	King (Yang di-Pertuan Agong)	
Maldives	Sunni Islam	Ministry of Islamic Affairs and Endowments	Minister	
Mauritania	Sunni Islam	High Council for Fatwa and Administrative Appeals	President	
Morocco	Islam	Supreme Council of Ulema	General-Secretary	King
Oman	Islam (Ibadi)	Grand Mufti		
Pakistan	Islam	Council of Islamic Ideology	Chairman	
Palestine	Islam	Palestinian Supreme Fatwa Council	Grand Mufti	
Qatar	Sunni Islam	Ministry of Awqaf and Islamic Affairs	Minister	
Russia	Islam	Central Spiritual Administration of the Muslims of Russia	Grand Mufti	
Sahrawi Arab Democratic Republic	Islam	Ministry of Religious Affairs and Traditional Education	Minister	
Saudi Arabia	Sunni Islam (Hanbali)	Council of Senior Scholars	Grand Mufti	King (Custodian of the Two Holy Mosques)
Somalia	Sunni Islam	Ulema Council	Chairman	
United Arab Emirates	Islam	Fatwa Council	Chairman	
Turkey	Islam	Presidency of Religious Affairs	President	
Yemen	Islam	Ministry of Endowments and Guidance	Minister	
Yemen	Shia Islam (Zaydi)	Supreme Political Council (Houthis)	Leader	
Judaism
Bosnia and Herzegovina	Judaism	Jewish Community of Bosnia and Hezergovina	President	
Israel	Judaism	Chief Rabbinate of Israel	Chief Rabbi(s)	
Latvia	Judaism	Jewish Community of Latvia	Executive director	President
Lithuania	Rabbinic Judaism	Jewish Community of Lithuania	President/Chairperson	
Lithuania	Karaite Judaism	The Religious Community of Lithuanian Karaims	Hachan (Highest Priest)	
Morocco	Judaism	Council of Jewish Communities of Morocco	Secretary-General	King
Morocco	Judaism	National Council of the Moroccan Jewish Community	Executive director	King
Morocco	Judaism	Commission of Moroccan Jews Abroad	Executive director	King
Morocco	Judaism	Foundation of Moroccan Judaism	Executive director	King
Lebanon	Judaism	Jewish Community Council	President	
Russia	Judaism	Federation of Jewish Communities of Russia	Chief Rabbi	
Russia	Judaism	Congress of the Jewish Religious Organizations and Associations in Russia	Chief Rabbi	
Sikhism
India	Sikhism	Shiromani Gurdwara Parbandhak Committee	President	
European Polytheism
Lithuania	Romuva	High Priest/Priestess		
Taoism
China	Taoism	Chinese Taoist Association	President	

== Former state religions ==
=== Roman religion and Christianity ===
Nicene Christianity, as opposed to Arianism and other ideologies deemed heretical, was declared to be the state religion of the Roman Empire on 27 February 380 by the decree De fide catolica of Emperor Theodosius I.

=== Han dynasty Confucianism ===
In China, the Han dynasty (206 BC – 220 AD) advocated Confucianism as the de facto state religion, establishing tests based on Confucian texts as an entrance requirement into government service—although, in fact, the "Confucianism" advocated by the Han emperors may be more properly termed a sort of Confucian Legalism or "State Confucianism". This sort of Confucianism continued to be regarded by the emperors, with a few notable exceptions, as a form of state religion from this time until the collapse of the Chinese monarchy in 1912. Note, however, there is a debate over whether Confucianism (including Neo-Confucianism) is a religion or purely a philosophical system.

=== Yuan dynasty Buddhism ===
During the Mongol-led Yuan dynasty of China (1271–1368 AD), Tibetan Buddhism was established as the de facto state religion by the Kublai Khan, the founder of the Yuan dynasty. The top-level department and government agency known as the Bureau of Buddhist and Tibetan Affairs (Xuanzheng Yuan) was set up in Khanbaliq (modern Beijing) to supervise Buddhist monks throughout the empire. Since Kublai Khan only esteemed the Sakya sect of Tibetan Buddhism, other religions became less important. Before the end of the Yuan dynasty, 14 leaders of the Sakya sect had held the post of Imperial Preceptor (Dishi), thereby enjoying special power.

=== Golden Horde and Ilkhanate ===
The Mongol rulers Ghazan of Ilkhanate and Uzbeg of Golden Horde converted to Islam in 1295 AD because of the Muslim Mongol emir Nawruz and in 1313 AD because of Sufi Bukharan sayyid and sheikh Ibn Abdul Hamid respectively. Their official favoring of Islam as the state religion coincided with a marked attempt to bring the regime closer to the non-Mongol majority of the regions they ruled. In Ilkhanate, Christian and Jewish subjects lost their equal status with Muslims and again had to pay the poll tax; Buddhists had the starker choice of conversion or expulsion.

=== Other states ===
- Bolivia state religion until 2009 Bolivian constitution.
- The State of Deseret was an unrecognised provisional state of the United States, proposed in 1849, by Mormon settlers in Salt Lake City. The provisional state existed for slightly over two years, but attempts to gain recognition by the United States government floundered for various reasons. The Utah Territory which was then founded was under Mormon control, and repeated attempts to gain statehood met resistance, in part due to concerns that the principle of separation of church and state conflicted with the practice of members of the Church of Jesus Christ of Latter-day Saints placing their highest value on "following counsel" in virtually all matters relating to their church-centered lives. The state of Utah was eventually admitted to the union on 4 January 1896, after the various issues had been resolved.
- Kingdom of Hawaii: From 1862 to 1893 the Church of Hawaii, an Anglican body, was the official state and national church of the Kingdom of Hawaii.
- Japanese Empire: see details in the State Shintō article.
- Netherlands: Article 133 of the 1814 Constitution stipulated the Sovereign Prince should be a member of the Reformed Church; this provision was dropped in the 1815 Constitution. The 1815 Constitution also provided for a state salary and pension for the priesthood of established religions at the time (Protestantism, Catholicism and Judaism). This settlement, nicknamed de zilveren koorde (the silver cord), was abolished in 1983.
- Nepal was the world's only Hindu state until 2015, when the new constitution declared it a secular state. Proselytizing remains illegal.
- Ottoman Empire: the Millet system (Turkish: [millet]; Ottoman Turkish: ملت) was the independent court of law pertaining to "personal law" under which a confessional community (a group abiding by the laws of Muslim Sharia, Christian Canon law, or Jewish Halakha) was allowed to rule itself under its own laws.
- Spain: Spain was traditionally a Catholic confessional state with the exception of the 1st and 2nd Republics, and currently is a non-confessional state.
- Sudan had Islam as the official religion during the rule of Omar al-Bashir according to the Constitution of Sudan of 2005. It was declared a secular state in September 2020.
- Tunisia: Article 5 of the Constitution declares that "Tunisia is part of the Muslim world, and the state alone must work to achieve the goals of pure Islam in preserving honorable life of religious freedom". Although Islam has been given special privileges by the Constitution, it is no longer the state religion.
- Tokugawa shogunate sanctioned Buddhism and Confucianism as the state religions. Buddhism became an arm of the shogunate, and temples were used for population registration. Distinctive schools of Japanese Buddhism such as Zen, Pure Land, and Nichiren structured Japanese religious life until the 19th century. Confucian Zhu Xi's teaching became a major intellectual force, and the Four Books became available to virtually every educated person.

== Former state churches ==
=== State churches at national level ===
Country	Church	Denomination	Disestablished
Argentina	Roman Catholic Church	Catholic	1853
Austria	Roman Catholic Church	Catholic	1918
Barbados	Church in the Province of the West Indies	Anglican	1968
Bolivia	Roman Catholic Church	Catholic	2009
Brazil (Note: Brazilian Laws – the Federal Constitution – The Organization of State. V-brazil.com. Retrieved 5 May 2012. Brazil had Roman Catholicism as the state religion from the country's independence in 1822, until the fall of the Brazilian Empire. The new Republican government passed in 1890, Decree 119-A "Decreto 119-A". "Prohibits federal and state authorities to intervene on religion, granting freedom of religion." (still in force), instituting the separation of church and state in Brazilian law. Positivist thinker Demétrio Nunes Ribeiro urged the new government to adopt this stance. The 1891 Constitution, the first under the Republican system of government, abolished privileges for any specific religion, reaffirming the separation. This has been the case as stated in Article XIX of the 1988 Constitution of Brazil currently in force. The Preamble, however, does refer to "God's protection" over the document's promulgation, but this is not considered a legal endorsement of belief in any deity.)	Roman Catholic Church	Catholic	1890
Bulgaria	Bulgarian Orthodox Church	Eastern Orthodox	1946
Chile	Roman Catholic Church	Catholic	1925
Colombia	Roman Catholic Church	Catholic	1936
Cyprus	Church of Cyprus	Eastern Orthodox	1977 (Note: After the death of President and Ethnarch Makarios III.)
Czechoslovakia	Roman Catholic Church	Catholic	1920
Dominican Republic	Roman Catholic Church	Catholic	1966
Ecuador	Roman Catholic Church	Catholic	1906
El Salvador	Roman Catholic Church	Catholic	1886
Equatorial Guinea	Roman Catholic Church	Catholic	1991
Ethiopia	Ethiopian Orthodox Church	Oriental Orthodox	1974
Finland	Evangelical Lutheran Church of Finland	Lutheran	1867
Finland	Finnish Orthodox Church	Eastern Orthodox	1917
France	Cult of Reason	N/A	1794 (established 1793)
France	Cult of the Supreme Being	N/A	1794 (banned in 1802)
France	Roman Catholic Church (Note: In France, the Concordat of 1801 made the Roman Catholic, Calvinist, and Lutheran churches, along with Judaism, into state-sponsored religions until the 1905 French law on the Separation of the Churches and the State.)	Catholic	1905
Germany (Federal government)	None since 1866, but historically the federal states of Germany had their own state churches before the overthrow of the monarchy	N/A	N/A
Greece	Church of Greece	Eastern Orthodox	The Church is recognized by the Greek Constitution as the "prevailing religion" in Greece.
Guatemala	Roman Catholic Church	Catholic	1871
Haiti	Roman Catholic Church	Catholic	1987
Honduras	Roman Catholic Church	Catholic	1880
Hungary (Note: In Hungary, the constitutional laws of 1848 declared five established churches of equal status: the Roman Catholic, Calvinist, Lutheran, Eastern Orthodox and Unitarian Church. In 1868, the law was ratified again after the Ausgleich and in 1895 Judaism was added as the sixth established faith. In 1948, every distinction between the different denominations was abolished.)	Roman Catholic Church	Catholic	1946
Iceland	Lutheran Evangelical Church	Lutheran	—
Ireland (Note: In the Kingdom of Ireland, the Church of Ireland was established in the Reformation. The Act of Union 1800 created the United Kingdom of Great Britain and Ireland, with the United Church of England and Ireland established outside Scotland. The Irish Church Act 1869 demerged and disestablished the Church of Ireland, and the island was partitioned in 1922. The Republic of Ireland's 1937 constitution prohibits any established religion. Originally, it recognized the "special position" of the Roman Catholic Church "as the guardian of the Faith professed by the great majority of the citizens", and recognized "the Church of Ireland, the Presbyterian Church in Ireland, the Methodist Church in Ireland, the Religious Society of Friends in Ireland, as well as Jewish Congregations and the other religious denominations existing in Ireland at the date of the coming into operation of this Constitution". These provisions were deleted in 1973.)	Church of Ireland	Anglican	1871
Italy	Roman Catholic Church	Catholic	18 February 1984 (effective per 25 April 1985)
Liechtenstein	Roman Catholic Church	Catholic	—
Luxembourg	Roman Catholic Church	Catholic	Not an official state church.
Malta	Roman Catholic Church	Catholic	—
Mexico	Roman Catholic Church	Catholic	1857 (reestablished from 1864 to 1867)
Monaco	Roman Catholic Church	Catholic	—
Netherlands	Dutch Reformed Church	Reformed	1795
Nicaragua (Note: Article 47 of the Political Constitution of 1893 provided that "no legislation may be passed establishing or protecting any religion or prohibiting its free exercise." While the Constitution was promulgated in 1893, Article 161 thereof provided that it would not take effect until July 11, 1894.)	Roman Catholic Church	Catholic	1893
Norway	Church of Norway	Lutheran	2012 (effective per 1 January 2017) (Note: Since 2012, the Constitution of Norway does not name Lutheranism as the state religion, and in 2017 the Church became an independent legal entity. However, Article 16 says "The Church of Norway [...] will remain the National Church of Norway and will as such be supported by the State." The separation was official on 1 January 2017.)
Panama	Roman Catholic Church	Catholic	1904
Paraguay	Roman Catholic Church	Catholic	1992
Peru	Roman Catholic Church	Catholic	1979
Philippines (Note: The Philippines was among several possessions ceded by Spain to the United States in 1898; religious freedom was subsequently guaranteed in the archipelago by the American colonial government. This was codified in the Philippine Organic Act (1902), section 5: "... That no law shall be made respecting an establishment of religion or prohibiting the free exercise thereof, and that the free exercise and enjoyment of religious profession and worship, without discrimination or preference, shall forever be allowed." A similarly-worded provision still exists in the present Constitution, promulgated in 1987. While neither a state nor national church, the Catholic Church in the Philippines remains the predominant faith of the people, still wielding considerable political and cultural influence.)	Roman Catholic Church	Catholic	1898
Poland (Note: Article 25 of the constitution states: "1. Churches and other religious organizations shall have equal rights. 2. Public authorities in the Republic of Poland shall be impartial in matters of personal conviction". Article 114 of the Polish March Constitution of 1921 declared the Roman Catholic Church to hold "the principal position among religious denominations equal before the law" (in reference to the idea of first among equals). This was continuously enforced by Article 81 of the April Constitution of 1935. The Soviet-backed PKWN Manifesto of 1944 reapplied the March Constitution, which remained in force until it was replaced by the Small Constitution of 1947.)	Roman Catholic Church	Catholic	1947
Portugal (Note: Until the end of the monarchy in 1910, Roman Catholicism was considered the state religion. From the 1940s until the promulgation of official secularism in the Portuguese Constitution of 1976, it was a powerful institution under the Estado Novo regime that had ended in the 1975 Carnation Revolution.)	Roman Catholic Church	Catholic	1910 and 1976
Romania	Romanian Orthodox Church	Eastern Orthodox	1947
Russia	Russian Orthodox Church	Eastern Orthodox	1917
Spain	Roman Catholic Church	Catholic	1978
Sweden	Church of Sweden	Lutheran	2000
Tuvalu	Church of Tuvalu	Reformed	—
Uruguay	Roman Catholic Church	Catholic	1918 (effective since 1919)
United States (Federal government) (Note: The First Amendment to the U.S. Constitution explicitly forbids the federal government from enacting any law respecting a religious establishment, and thus bans either designating an official church nationwide, or interfering with State and local official churches—which were common when the First Amendment was enacted. It did not prevent state governments from establishing official churches. Connecticut continued to do so until it replaced its colonial Charter with the Connecticut Constitution of 1818; Massachusetts retained an establishment of religion in general until 1833. Until its substitution by Article of Amendment XI in 1834, Article III of the Massachusetts constitution's bill of rights provided, "... the legislature shall, from time to time, authorize and require, the several towns, parishes, precincts, and other bodies politic, or religious societies, to make suitable provision, at their own expense, for the institution of the public worship of God, and for the support and maintenance of public Protestant teachers of piety, religion and morality, in all cases where such provision shall not be made voluntarily." The Fourteenth Amendment to the U.S. Constitution, ratified in 1868, makes no mention of religious establishment, but forbids the states to "abridge the privileges or immunities" of U.S. citizens, or to "deprive any person of life, liberty, or property, without due process of law". In the 1947 case of Everson v. Board of Education, the Supreme Court of the United States held that this later provision incorporates the First Amendment's Establishment Clause as applying to the States, and thereby prohibits state and local religious establishments. The exact boundaries of this prohibition are still disputed, and are a frequent source of cases raised to the Supreme Court — especially as the Court must now balance, on a state level, First Amendment prohibitions on government establishment of official religions with the First Amendment prohibitions on government interference with the free exercise of religion. See school prayer for such a controversy in contemporary American politics. All current State constitutions do mention a Creator, but include guarantees of religious liberty parallel to the First Amendment. The constitutions of eight states (Arkansas, Maryland, Mississippi, North Carolina, Pennsylvania, South Carolina, Tennessee, and Texas) also contain clauses that forbid atheists from holding public office. However, these clauses were held by the Supreme Court to be unenforceable in the 1961 case of Torcaso v. Watkins, where the Court ruled unanimously that such clauses constituted a religious test incompatible with the religious test prohibition in Article 6 Section 3 of the Constitution. The Anglican Church of Hawaii was the state church of the Kingdom of Hawaii from 1862 until the monarchy was overthrown in 1893, with the islands formally annexed by the United States in 1898.)	none since 1776, which was made explicit in the Bill of Rights in 1792	N/A	N/A (Note: Some state legislatures required all its citizens to be members of a church and some had official churches, such as Congregationalism in some New England states (e.g. Massachusetts). This eventually ended in 1833 when Massachusetts was the last state to disestablish its church. See Separation of church and state in the United States.)
Venezuela	Roman Catholic Church	Catholic	1961
Yugoslavia	Serbian Orthodox Church	Eastern Orthodox	1921

=== States of the German Empire ===
States	Church	Denomination	Disestablished
Anhalt	Evangelical State Church of Anhalt	United Protestant	1918
Baden		United Protestant	1918
Baden	United Evangelical Protestant State Church of Baden	United Protestant	1918
Bavaria	Roman Catholic Church	Catholic	1918
Bavaria	Protestant State Church in the Kingdom of Bavaria right of the Rhine	Lutheran and Reformed	1918
Bavaria	United Protestant Evangelical Christian Church of the Palatinate United Protestant	United Protestant	1918
Brunswick	Evangelical Lutheran State Church in Brunswick	Lutheran	1918
Hesse	Evangelical Church in Hesse	United Protestant	1918
Lippe	Church of Lippe	Reformed	1918
Lübeck	Evangelical Lutheran Church in the State of Lübeck	Lutheran	1918
Mecklenburg-Schwerin	Evangelical Lutheran State Church of Mecklenburg-Schwerin	Lutheran	1918
Mecklenburg-Strelitz	Mecklenburg-Strelitz State Church	Lutheran	1918
Oldenburg	Evangelical Lutheran Church of Oldenburg	Lutheran	1918
Prussia (pre-1866 provinces)	Evangelical State Church of Prussia's older Provinces (nine ecclesiastical provinces)	United Protestant	1918
Prussia (Province of Hanover)	Evangelical Reformed State Church of the Province of Hanover	Reformed	1918
Prussia (Province of Hanover)	Evangelical Lutheran State Church of Hanover	Lutheran	1918
Prussia (Province of Hesse-Nassau, partially)	Evangelical State Church of Frankfurt upon Main	United Protestant	1918
Prussia (Province of Hesse-Nassau, partially)	Evangelical Church of Electoral Hesse	United Protestant	1918
Prussia (Province of Hesse-Nassau, partially)	Evangelical State Church in Nassau	United Protestant	1918
Prussia (Province of Schleswig-Holstein)	Evangelical Lutheran Church of Schleswig-Holstein	Lutheran	1918
Saxony	Evangelical Lutheran State Church of Saxony	Lutheran	1918
Schaumburg-Lippe	Evangelical Lutheran State Church of Schaumburg-Lippe	Lutheran	1918
Thuringia	Church bodies in principalities which merged in Thuringia in 1920	Lutheran	1918
Waldeck	Evangelical State Church of Waldeck and Pyrmont	United Protestant	1918
Württemberg	Evangelical State Church in Württemberg	Lutheran	1918

=== States of the United States of America ===
Listed by order of admission to the American Union:

State		Church	Denomination	Disestablished
1	Delaware	Never had a state church, even in colonial times	N/A	N/A
2	Pennsylvania	Never had a state church, even in colonial times	N/A	N/A
3	New Jersey	Never had a state church, even in colonial times	N/A	N/A
4	Georgia	Church of England (1732-1785); Episcopal Church (1785-1789)	Anglican	1789
5	Connecticut	Established Congregational Churches	Reformed	1818
6	Massachusetts	Established Congregational Churches	Reformed	1780 (state funding suspended in 1833)
7	Maryland	Roman Catholic Church (1632-1701); Church of England (1701-1776)	Catholic (1632-1701); Anglican (1701-1776)	1776
8	South Carolina	Church of England (1732-1785); Episcopal Church (1785-1790)	Anglican	1790
9	New Hampshire	Established Congregational Churches	Reformed	1790
10	Virginia	Church of England (1732-1785); Episcopal Church (1785-1786)	Anglican	1786
11	New York	Church of England	Anglican	1777
12	North Carolina	Church of England	Anglican	1776
13	Rhode Island	Never had a state church, even in colonial times	N/A	N/A
14	Vermont	Never had a state church, even before joining the American Union	N/A	N/A
15	Kentucky	Never had a state church	N/A	N/A
16	Tennessee	Never had a state church	N/A	N/A
17	Ohio	Never had a state church	N/A	N/A
18	Louisiana	Roman Catholic Church	Catholic	1805 (year of the Louisiana Purchase)
19	Indiana	Never had a state church	N/A	N/A
20	Mississippi	Never had a state church	N/A	N/A
21	Illinois	Never had a state church	N/A	N/A
22	Alabama	Never had a state church	N/A	N/A
23	Maine	Established Congregational Churches; Never had a state church while a state	Reformed	1780 (state funding suspended upon statehood in 1820)
24	Missouri	Never had a state church	N/A	N/A
25	Arkansas	Never had a state church	N/A	N/A
26	Michigan	Never had a state church	N/A	N/A
27	Florida	Roman Catholic Church	Catholic	1822 (year that joined the United States as a territory)
28	Texas	Roman Catholic Church	Catholic	1834 (Texas Revolution)
29	Iowa	Never had a state church	N/A	N/A
30	Wisconsin	Never had a state church	N/A	N/A
31	California	Roman Catholic Church	Catholic	1848 (year that joined the United States as part of the Mexican Cession)
32	Minnesota	Never had a state church	N/A	N/A
33	Oregon	Never had a state church	N/A	N/A
34	Kansas	Never had a state church	N/A	N/A
35	West Virginia	Never had a state church	N/A	N/A
36	Nevada	Roman Catholic Church	Catholic	1848 (year that joined the United States as part of the Mexican Cession)
37	Nebraska	Never had a state church	N/A	N/A
38	Colorado	Never had a state church	N/A	N/A
39	North Dakota	Never had a state church	N/A	N/A
40	South Dakota	Never had a state church	N/A	N/A
41	Montana	Never had a state church	N/A	N/A
42	Washington	Never had a state church	N/A	N/A
43	Idaho	Never had a state church	N/A	N/A
44	Wyoming	Never had a state church	N/A	N/A
45	Utah	Roman Catholic Church (before 1848) The Church of Jesus Christ of Latter-day Saints (1849-1850, in the State of Deseret, never recognized by the US federal government)	Catholic (before 1848) Mormon (1849-1850)	1848 (year that joined the United States as part of the Mexican Cession); 1850 (Utah Territory created)
46	Oklahoma	Never had a state church, even before joining the American Union	N/A	N/A
47	New Mexico	Roman Catholic Church	Catholic	1848 (year that joined the United States as part of the Mexican Cession)
48	Arizona	Roman Catholic Church	Catholic	1848 (year that joined the United States as part of the Mexican Cession)
49	Alaska	Russian Orthodox Church	Eastern Orthodox	1867 (year that joined the United States as a territory)
50	Hawaii	Church of Hawaii	Anglican	1893

=== Constituent Countries of the United Kingdom ===
Constituent Countries	Church	Denomination	Disestablished
England	Church of England	Anglican	—
Scotland	Church of Scotland	Presbyterian	"The Kirk" remains the national church, with state control disclaimed since 1638. Not an established faith per the Church of Scotland Act 1921.
Wales (Note: The Church in Wales was split from the Church of England in 1920 by Welsh Church Act 1914, and at the same time becoming disestablished.)	Church of England	Anglican	1920
Northern Ireland	Church of Ireland	Anglican	1871

=== Constituent Countries of the Danish Realm ===
Constituent Countries	Church	Denomination	Disestablished
Denmark	Church of Denmark	Lutheran	—
Faroe Islands	Church of the Faroe Islands	Lutheran	Elevated from a diocese of the Church of Denmark in 2007 (the two remain in close cooperation).
Greenland	Church of Denmark	Lutheran	Under discussion to be elevated from the Diocese of Greenland in the Church of Denmark to a state church for Greenland, similar to the Faroese Church.

== Former confessional states ==
The list of former confessional states only includes states that abolished their state religion themselves, not states with a state religion that were conquered, fell apart or otherwise disappeared.

=== Buddhism ===
Country	Denomination	Disestablished
Bhutan	Mahayana Buddhism	–
Cambodia	Theravada Buddhism	– (1975-1991)
China	Mahayana Buddhism (Gelug school)	1912
Laos	Theravada Buddhism	1975
Mongolia	Mahayana Buddhism	1924
Myanmar	Theravada Buddhism	– (1961-2008)
Thailand (Siam)	Theravada Buddhism	1932
Japan	Japanese Buddhism	1868

=== Confucianism ===
Country	Disestablished
China	1912

=== Hinduism ===
Country	Disestablished
Nepal	2008 (de facto); 2015 (de jure)

=== Islam ===
Country	Denomination	Disestablished
Gambia	Islam	2017
Sudan	Islam	2020
Tunisia	Islam	2022
Turkey	Islam	1928 (Note: The Turkish Constitution of 1924 was amended for the first time on 10 April 1928, including removing inter alia Article 2 and the provision of "Religion of the Turkish state is Islam".)

=== Shinto ===
Country	Denomination	Disestablished
Japan	State Shinto	1947 (de facto)

== See also ==
- Constitutional references to God
- Blasphemy law
- Ceremonial deism
- Church tax
- Civil religion
- Confessional state
- Divine rule
- Elite religion
- Institutional theory
- List of national legal systems
- Major religious groups
- Nonsectarian
- Phyletism
- Religious education
- Religious law
- Religious toleration
- Religious intolerance
- Religious supremacism
- Secular religion
- Secularism
- Secularity
- Secularization
- Separation of church and state
- Sociology of religion
- State atheism
- Status of religious freedom by country
- Secular state
