= Protestantism in Costa Rica =

A study made by the University of Costa Rica in 2021 showed that 19% of the population were Evangelical Christians and 1% were Traditional Protestants.

In Latin America most Protestants are called Evangelicos. There are different Protestant denominations that are active there, mostly Evangelical, Pentecostal, Lutheran, Baptist, Adventist and the Costa Rican Evangelical Presbyterian Church. The country is also 47% Catholic.

The first Seventh-day Adventist missionaries arrived in 1903, and the Adventist church currently had 55,680 members in the country in 2001.

== See also ==
- Religion in Costa Rica
