= Reforme =

Reforme may refer to:

- Reforme (Romanian newspaper) (lit. 'Reforms'), the 1903 name of Românul de la Pind, published in Bucharest
- La Réforme, (lit. 'Reform'), a 19th-century French newspaper, based in Paris

== See also ==
- Reform (disambiguation)
