= Reform Movement (disambiguation) =

A reform movement is a type of social movement.

Reform Movement may also refer to:

- Reform Movement (Belgium), a political party
- Reform Movement (France), a political party
- Reform Movement (Guatemala), a political party
- Reform Movement (Ireland - Unionist), an Irish organisation campaigning for Ireland to rejoin the Commonwealth
- Reform movement in Judaism
- La Reforma, the Liberal agenda which transformed Mexico
- The Reform Movement (Upper Canada) 1817–1849
- Reform movement (pre-Confederation Canada) 1830s–1848
- Reform Party of Canada 1987-2000
