= Reformer =

A reformer is someone who works for reform.

Reformer may also refer to:

== Entertainment and media ==
- Rutherglen Reformer, a Scottish newspaper first published in 1875
- The Reformer, a short-lived American newspaper published in 1837
- The Reformers (film), 1916

== Religion and philosophy ==
- Reform movement, a general term for a social or political movement to bring change
- Protestant Reformers, theologians in 16th century Europe

== Science and technology ==
- Catalytic reformer, in an oil refinery
- Hydrogen reformer, extracting hydrogen
- Methane reformer, producing hydrogen
- Methanol reformer, producing hydrogen from methanol
- Reformer, a personality type in the Enneagram of Personality
- Steam reformer

== Other uses ==
- Pilates reformer, an exercise machine
- Reformers Bookshop, Australia
