= Reform Club (disambiguation) =

The Reform Club is a private members club.

Reform Club may also refer to:

== Japanese political parties ==
- Japan Renaissance Party (改革クラブ, lit. 'Reform Club'), founded 2008, predecessor of the New Renaissance Party
- Kakushin Club, (革新倶楽部, lit. 'Reform Club' or 'Innovation Club'), 1922—1925, part of the Taishō Democracy Movement
- Reform Club (改革クラブ), founded by Tatsuo Ozawa in 1998, wiped out after 2000 election

== Other ==
- Reform Club of Hong Kong, Hong Kong political group
- Manchester Reform Club, former club
