= Article 75 of the Constitution of Costa Rica =

Costa Rican constitutional article

The article 75 of the Constitution of Costa Rica establishes Catholicism as the country's state religion. (Note: Article 2 of the Constitution of Argentina explicitly states that the government supports the Roman Catholic Apostolic Faith, but its not the state religion.) Current debate about the issue and the passing toward a full secular state are in the public and political debate. This article is also the only one in the Title VI, only chapter of the Constitution dealing with religion.

== Text of the article ==
La Religión Católica, Apostólica, Romana, es la del Estado, el cual contribuye a su mantenimiento, sin impedir el libre ejercicio en la República de otros cultos que no se opongan a la moral universal ni a las buenas costumbres.

English translation according to the site CostaRicanLaw.com:

The Roman Catholic and Apostolic Religion is the religion of the State, which contributes to its maintenance, without preventing the free exercise in the Republic of other forms of worship that are not opposed to universal morality or good customs.

== Controversy ==
Like other issues as same-sex marriage, marijuana legalization, in vitro fertilization and abortion, church-state separation is an issue that often splits conservative and progressive voters in Costa Rica.

Costa Rica like many Latin American countries has three main religious communities; Catholics (52%), Evangelical Christians (22%) and non-religious including agnostics and atheists (17%). Whilst Catholics are split on the issue, most non-religious citizens support the secular state whilst more Evangelical Christians oppose it (despite the fact that Evangelism is not the official religion and would not be affected by the measure), mostly because they see it as a gradual transition toward state atheism.

The National Liberation Party, Citizens' Action Party and Broad Front support church-state separation whilst the Social Christian Republican Party, Costa Rican Renewal Party, National Restoration Party and New Republic Party oppose it.

There is a constitutional reform bill under discussion in the Legislative Assembly in parliamentary committees, however as the Evangelical caucuses oppose it its advance have been null.

== Public opinion ==
In 2011, 41% of Costa Ricans were in favor of eliminating article 75 of the Constitution according to a Unimer poll. A National University survey of 2014 showed only 25% of support for such reform. A survey made by the University of Costa Rica in 2017 found the same results; 25% support.

A sociological study made between 2013 and 2014 showed that most practicing Catholics support a secular state as they consider that the economic bond between church and state functions as a "gag" on the Church and support the separation of church and state, a position also held by most non-practicing Catholics. Non-religious people vastly support secularism and argue that no church should receive state funding.

Neo-Pentecostals on the other hand fiercely oppose laicism as they see the secular state as state atheism, and consider that the current status of a confessional state also protects the Evangelical Churches. Historical Protestants on the other hand tend to understand better the difference between secularism and atheism and some support the secular state. However, a large number of these non-Neo-Pentecostal Protestants argue that all churches should receive state funding and that Costa Rica's official religion should be Christianity and not Catholicism in particular.

Finally, religious minorities such as Muslims, Baháʼís, Zen, Tibetan and Nichiren Buddhists, Taoists, New Agers, and Hindus overwhelmingly support a secular state and laicism, and consider that no religion should receive state funding.
