= Reforma =

Reforma, the Spanish word meaning reform, has the following meanings:

== Companies and organizations ==
- Reforma (newspaper), a daily published in Mexico City

- Grupo Reforma, parent company of the newspaper
- Agencia Reforma, news wire agency of the same group

- REFORMA, the U.S. National Association to Promote Library and Information Services to Latinos and the Spanish-speaking
- Reforma, a rock band from Chicago that broke up in 2004. Drummer and guitarist are now in Madina Lake

== Historical ==
- La Reforma, a period of liberal reforms in the history of Mexico beginning in 1855

- Guerra de Reforma, a war fought during this period

== Places ==
- Paseo de la Reforma, an avenue in Mexico City
- Avenida Reforma, an avenue in Guatemala City
- Reforma, Chiapas, town in southern Mexico
- Reforma de Pineda, town in Oaxaca, Mexico
- La Reforma, San Marcos, a municipality in Guatemala
- Santa Lucía La Reforma, a municipality in Guatemala
- Łabunie-Reforma, a village in eastern Poland
- La Reforma, Texas, a community in Starr County, Texas, United States

== Buildings ==
- Paseo Reforma, shopping mall in Nuevo Laredo, Tamaulipas, Mexico
- Torre Reforma, skyscraper in Mexico City

== Geology ==
- La Reforma (caldera), a volcanic feature in Mexico's Baja California Peninsula

== Transportation ==
- Reforma (Mexico City Metrobús, Line 1), a BRT station in Mexico City
- Reforma (Mexico City Metrobús, Line 7), a BRT station in Mexico City
- Reforma railway station, a station in Oaxaca
