= Reformasi =

Reformasi (Malay and Indonesian, 'reform' or 'reformation') may refer to:

- Reform era in Indonesia, which began with the downfall of President Suharto in 1998
- Reformasi (Malaysia), political movements in Malaysia that first emerged in 1998, initiated by Anwar Ibrahim
