= Elba Damast =

Venezuelan visual artist (1944–2005)

- Born: 1944; Delta Amacuro, Venezuela
- Died: 2005 (aged 60–61)
- Education: Ramon Zapata School of Theatre and Literature, School of Plastic Arts
- Style: Surrealism
- Website: elbadamast.com

Elba Damast (born in 1944, in Delta Amacuro, Venezuela, died in 2005) was a Venezuelan artist.

== Biography ==
Damast was born during 1944 in Delta Amacuro, Venezuela. She was the third oldest of her parents' children and was expected to help take care of her younger siblings. Her close family upbringing became a main artistic theme that she expressed throughout her career.

She traveled frequently throughout her life, which helped to develop her artistic palette. From 1964 to 1966, Damast studied in Paris. From 1967 to 1968, she returned to her native Venezuela. From 1969, she traveled throughout South America in order to cultivate and incorporate more Latin American influences into her art. In 1972, she moved to New York City, where she lived for the rest of her life. While living in New York Damast adopted Surrealist artistic styles. She died in 2005.

== Education ==
While in Venezuela, Damast attended Ramon Zapata School of Theatre and Literature from 1961 to 1963. She then transitioned into the School of Plastic Arts and, through a school program, was able to travel throughout Europe for several years.

== Select artworks ==
=== Memories of Things to Come, 2004 ===
Memories of Things to Come is an interactive video installation in which Damast utilizes the theme of time to re-imagine childhood from an adult perspective. The installation consists of several chairs and desks which the participant can use. Upon each desk sits a sculptural replica of a heart. Within the sculpture, a video screen plays several images that Susan Hoeltzel states are meant to invoke childhood memories.

The installation itself is meant to replicate the feeling of childhood within participants. The videos that play within the heart sculptures all play scenarios that depict children playing or individuals reminiscing about childhood memories. Even the chairs and desks are arranged in a format similar to a classroom setting. This work was the last art piece Damast produced, as she died the following year.

=== Untitled (Elba Damast 73), 1973 ===
The context behind this painting is unknown. The painting displays a side view of a women's body with a view of the body's interior. The interior view depicts strange white and blueish looking organs attached together with strings of color. A spinal column protrudes from the woman's back.

The painting exemplifies the style in which Damast frequently uses throughout her career. When Damast initially moved to New York in 1972, the city was the forefront of the Surrealist movement. The Surrealist style dominates this painting through the display of ambiguous and mysterious imagery.

== Exhibitions ==
=== Solo exhibitions ===
- 2004 “Memories of Things to Come,” Lehman College Art Gallery, Bronx, NY
- 1995 “New Works,” Joel Kessler Fine Art, Miami Beach, FL “Elba Damast,” Art Museum of the Americas, Washington, D.C.
- 1994 “The House Within,” Robin Hutchins Gallery, Maplewood, NJ “Recent Works,” Olsson Fine Art, Brussels, Belgium
- 1993 “Casa Om,” Plaza de Armas and Casa de la Alcaldia, San Juan, Puerto Rico “Casa Om,” Museum of Contemporary Art, Panama City, Panama “Casa Om,” Museo del Hombre Hondureño, Tegucigalpa, Honduras
- 1992 “Casa Om en America,” Morante Gallery, New York City “Casa Om,” Museum Patronato Pro-Patrimonio Cultural, San Salvador, El Salvador “Casa Om,” Museo de Arte Costarricense, Sala Julian Marchena, San José de Costa Rica “Propiedad del Silencio,” Galeria de Arte Ascaso, Valencia, Venezuela
- 1991 “Espiritu Abstracto,” Moss Gallery, San Francisco, California
- 1990 “Installation,” Museum of Contemporary Hispanic Art, New York City Galleri Orpheus, Eskilstuna, Sweden
- 1989 Landskrona Konsthall, Landskrona, Sweden
- 1988 Gallery 101, Malmö, Sweden Alexander Ernst Gallery, Washington, D.C. Littlejohn-Smith Gallery, New York City
- 1987 Littlejohn-Smith Gallery, New York City
- 1986 Cordozo School of Law, Yeshiva University, New York City Gallery 101, Malmö, Sweden Strand Galleriet, Södertälje, Sweden
- 1985 Galeria Freites, Caracas, Venezuela “Paintings & Works on Paper,” Littlejohn-Smith Gallery, New York City
- 1984 Housatonic Museum of Art, Bridgeport, CT “Paintings,” Littlejohn-Smith Gallery, New York City “Taller Del Ojo,” Galeria de Arte Naciaonal, Caracas, Venezuela Bülowska Galleriet, Malmö, Sweden Page 2
- 1983 Jack Gallery, New York, NY Littlejohn-Smith Gallery, New York, NY
- 1978 “Marron Era,” Venezuelan Consulate, New York, NY
- 1977 “Marron Era,” West Broadway Gallery, New York, NY
- 1973 Aida Hernandez Gallery, New York, NY
- 1972 “Trilogia,” Banap Gallery, Caracas, Venezuela
- 1971 Salon de Lectura, Valencia, Venezuela
- 1970 Ateneo de Valencia, Caracas, Venezuela Ateneo de Puerto Cabello, Valencia, Venezuela

=== Group exhibitions ===
- 2003 “De lo que yo soy/Of what I am,” Lehman College of Art “47th Annual Juried Print Exhibition,” Hunterdon Art Museum, Clinton, NJ
- 2001 “Un Encuentro,” Fundacion Banco Industrial, Caracas, Venezuela
- 2000 Museo de Arte Lia Bermudez, Maracaibo, Venezuela Gallery Artists, Galeria de Arte Ascaso, Valencia, Venezuela “Confrontacion,” Galeria Ateneo de Caracas, Caracas, Venezuela 1999 Museo de Arte Lia Bermudez, Maricaibo, Venezuela Gallery Artists, Galeria de Arte Ascaso, Valencia, Venezuela
- 1998 “IX Muestra de Pintura y Escultura Latino Americano,” Galeria Espacio, San Salvador, El Salvador “Festival de Arte 98,” Caracas Venezuela 1997 “La Casa, Su Idea. Enjemplo de la Escultura Reciente,” Plaza de España, Madrid “III Bienal, Barro de America,” Museo Alejandro Otero, Caracas, Venezuela
- 1996 “Earth Bound,” Maryland Art Center, Baltimore, MD “Latin American Women Artists 1915-1995,” Center For Fine Arts, Miami, Fl “Home Bodies,” LaSalle Partners at Nations Bank Plaza Charlotte, NC curated by Joyce Pomroy Schwartz
- 1995 “Barro de América Segunda Bienal,” Museo de Arte Contemporáneo de Caracas Sofia Imber, Caracas, Venezuela “Honors Nine Artist Featured in 1995-96 Biennial Exhibition I in Baltimore,” Walter Gomez Gallery, Baltimore, MD “Untitled,” Trout Gallery, Dickenson College, Carlyle, PA “Untitled,” Vista Gallery, New York, NY ”Latin American Women Artists, 1915 –1995,” Milwaukee Art Museum, Milwaukee, WI This exhibition traveled to: Page 3 - Phoenix Art Museum, Phoenix, AZ - The Denver Art Museum, Denver, CO - The National Museum of Women in the Arts, Washington DC (in 1996) - Center for the Fine Arts, Miami, FL (in 1996)
- 1995 “Wrinoko Arao a Nona, Creadores del Delta”, Orinoco, Consejo Nacional de la Cultura, Tucupita, Venezuela
- 1994 “Miami 94,” Joel Kessler Fine Art, Miami Beach, FL “House Sweet House,” New Jersey Center For Visual Arts, Summit, NJ “Latin Women Artist,” the Americas Gallery, New York, NY “Quinta Bienial de la Habana (5th Biennial of Havana),” La Habana, Cuba “FIA,” Galeria de Arte Ascaso Valencia, Ven “Latin America Against AIDS,” White Hall Gallery, New York, NY 1993 “Visiones Figuraciones,” Museo Ateneo de Arte Moderno, Santo Domingo, Dominican Republic “Latin Visions,” Joel Kessler Fine Art, Miami Beach, Florida “X Biennial de San Juan del Grabado Latin Americano,” San Juan, PR “IV Exposicion de Artistas Latinos Americanos,” Espacio Gallery, El Salvador “El Espiritu del Arte Latino Americano,” Valanti Gallery, San Jose, Costa Rica “Latin American Women,” Americas Gallery, New York City “Gallery Artists,” Espacio Fenix, Caracas, Venezuela.
- 1992 Museo Ateneo de Valencia, Valencia, Venezuela “The Impact of Two Worlds,” Artspace, New Haven, CT Americas Gallery, New York City, NY “Figuracioines,” Galeria de Arte Ascaso, Valencia, Venezuela
- 1991 Galeria de Arte Ascaso, Valencia, Venezuela “Chicago International Art Exhibition,” Nan Miller Gallery, Rochester, NY “The Awakening,” The Discovery Museum, Bridgeport, CT “Latin American Drawings Today,” San Diego Museum of Art, San Diego, CA “Bijoux Wizo XIV,” Salon Anual de Arte, Caracas, Venezuela “III Expocision de Artistas Latino Americanos,” Espacio Gallery, El Salvador Valanti Gallery, San Jose, Costa Rica “Group Exhibition,” Marvin Moss Gallery, San Francisco, CA “Group Exhibition,” Malen Gallery, Landskrona, Sweden “5th. International Biennial Print Exhibit 1991,” Taipei, Taiwan
- 1990 “Celebracion de la Raza,” Long Island University, Brooklyn Campus, New York, NY “Group Exhibition,” Malen Gallery, Landskrona, Sweden “Lines of Vision,” Museo de Arte Contemporaneo, Caracas, Venezuela “China...4,” P.S.1 Contemporary Art Center, L.I. City, New York “Sculpture of the Americas Into the Nineties,” Museum of Modern Art of Latin America, Washington, D.C. “Recent Trends in works of Art on Paper,” Museo de Arte Moderno de Buenos Aires, Buenos Aires, Argentina “Lines of Vision,” Grand Rapids Art Museum, Michigan “Lines of Vision,” University Art Gallery, University of North Texas, Texas “Lines of Vision,” Richard F. Brush Gallery, St. Lawrence University, Canton, NY “Lines of Vision,” University of Oklahoma Museum of Art, Norman, Oklahoma Page 4 * “Lines of Vision,” travels to Museums in: Mexico, Venezuela, Chile, Columbia, Argentina, Brazil, Portugal, & Spain
- 1989 “The Work of Contemporary Hispanic Artists,” Affiliated with the Museo del Barrio, Montclair State Collage Art Gallery, Montclair, NJ “Gallery Artist,” Virginia Miller Gallery, Miami, Florida “Juxtaposing Perceptions,” Museum of Contemporary Hispanic Art, New York “4th International Biennial Print Exhibit 1990,” Taipei, Taiwan “Intergraphic 90,” West Germany “China...4,” Blum Helman Warehouse, New York, NY “I Biennial Christian Dior,” Museo Contemporaneo Sofia Imber, Caracas, Venezuela “Juxta-Position,” Steelcase Corp. New York, NY “Lines of Vision,” Hillwood Art Gallery, May to June, New York, NY “Lines of Vision,” Blum Helman Gallery, July to Aug., New York, NY “Lines of Vision,” Murray State University, Kentucky
- 1988 “VII Biennial de San Juan del Grabado Latinoamericano y del Caribe,” San Juan, PR “IV Bienial Nacional de Escultura y Arte Effeimero,” Museo Francisco Narvaez de Porlamar, Porlamar, Venezuela “Gallery Artists,” Littlejohn-Smith Gallery, New York, NY Museum of Contemporary Hispanic Art, New York, NY “Abstract Vision,” Museum of Contemporary Hispanic Art, New York, NY “Paper Visions II,” Contemporary Latin-American Art, Housatonic Museum of Art, Bridgeport, Conn. “A Gallery of Latin-American Art,” Atlanta International School, Atlanta, Ba.
- 1987 “Images of a Culture,” Gray Art Gallery, North Carolina “Gallery Artists,” Metro Art Gallery, Los Angeles, CA “Gallery Artists,” Galeria Freites, Caracas, Venezuela
- 1986 “Gallery Artists,” Littlejohn-Smith Gallery, New York, NY “Gallery Artists,” Robert Kidd Gallery, Detroit, Michigan “14 Venezuelan Artists Living in United States,” Galeria Venezuela, New York, NY
- 1985 “Gallery Artist,” Littlejohn-Smith Gallery, New York, NY Museum of Contemporary Hispanic Art, New York, NY
- 1984 “New Trends, Latin-American Print Makers,” Eastern Kentucky University Richmond, KY “Third Latin American Graphics Arts Biennial,” Cayman Gallery, New York, NY
- 1983 “Gallery Artists,” Adams-Middleton Gallery, Dallas, TX “II Bienal Nacional de Artes Visuales,” Museo de Arte Contemporaneo, Caracas, Venezuela
- 1982 “Three South American Artists,” Ollantay Gallery, New York, NY “40th. Salon Arturo Michelena,” Valencia, Venezuela “Il Bienal del Grabado,” Cayman Gallery, New York, NY “Stockholm Art Fair,” Stockholm, Sweden Page 5
- 1981 “Latin American Women Artists,” Bronx Museum, New York, NY “Latin American Women Artists,” SOHO 20, New York, NY “1st Bienal de Artes Visuales,” Museo de Arte Contemporaneo, Caracas, Venezuela
- 1980 “V Bienal del Grabado Latinoamericano,” San Juan, PR “Important Contemporary Latin American Art Exhibit,” Ramapo College, NJ
- 1979 Queens Museum, Queens, NY Venezuelan Consulate, New York, NY
- 1977 Artist 77, Union Carbide Building, New York, NY
- 1976 New York Botanical Garden Museum, New York, NY “Five Latin-American Artists at the Humanities Gallery,” New York, NY Long Island University, Brooklyn Campus, Brooklyn, NY “Spanish and American Painters and Sculptors,” Metropolitan Museum of Art, New York, NY
- 1975 “Spanish and American Painters and Sculptors,” Bronx Museum, Bronx, NY
- 1974 “Spanish and American Painters and Sculptors,” the Community Gallery of the Brooklyn Museum, Brooklyn, NY
- 1973 “Six Painters,” Aida Hernandez Gallery, New York, NY “Sixth Annual Exhibition,” Avanti Gallery, New York, NY
- 1971 “Joven Actualidad,” Salon Arturo Michelena, Valencia, Venezuela “Venezolana, Studio Actual,” Galeria Rafael Monosterios, Caracas, Venezuela

== Collections ==
- Ab Vin Och Spritcentralen, Nöbbelöv, Sweden
- Banco de la República de Colombia, Bogotá, Colombia
- Coopers & Lybrand, Stockholm, Sweden
- Saab-Scania AB, Sôdertâlje, Sweden
- Museo De Arte Contemporaneo, Panama
- Museum of the Americas, Washington, D.C.
- Coca Cola Corporation, Atlanta Georgia
- Museum of Cincinnati, Cincinnati, Ohio
- Galeria de Arte Nacional, Caracas, Venezuela
- Museo de Arte Contemporáneo, Caracas, Venezuela
- Museo de Bellas Artes, Caracas, Venezuela
- Museo de Arte Costarrisence, San Jose, Costa Rica
- Museo Salón Arturo Michelena, Valencia, Venezuela
- Universidad Abierta, Caracas, Venezuela
- Cara Corporation, Kyoto Japan
- Shearson-Leahman Collection, New York, NY
- Housatonic Museum of Art, Bridgeport, CT
- Institute of Puerto Rican Culture, San Juan, Puerto Rico
- The Olsson Art Collection, Tommarp, Sweden

== Bibliography ==
- Henkes, Robert (1999) "Latin American Women Artists of the United States: The Works of 33 Twentieth-Century Women", McFarland and Company Inc.
- Puerto Cecilia (1996) "Latin American Women Artists, Kahlo and Look Who Else", Greenwood Press
- Van Wagner, Judy (1990) "Lines of Vision: Drawings by Contemporary Women" Women's Art Inc.
- Zimmer, William (2004) "Art Review: What the Heart Reveals" The New York Times
- Genecchio, Benjamen (2004) "Art Review: As Fall Beckons, Women Rule" The New York Times
