= Manuel de la Cruz González =

Costa Rican painter (1909–1986)

Manuel de la Cruz González Luján (April 16, 1909 — September 22, 1986) was a Costa Rican painter and sculptor, primarily known for his abstract paintings. One of the first artists to introduce contemporary art to Costa Rica, González received the Aquileo J. Echeverría National Prize for painting in 1963 and the Magón National Prize for Culture, the highest cultural honor in Costa Rica, in 1981.

== Biography ==
Manuel de la Cruz González was born in San José, Costa Rica, in 1909. He was self-educated as an artist.

From 1928 to 1937, he participated in fine arts exhibitions hosted by the newspaper Diario de Costa Rica at the National Theatre. Beginning in 1934, he was an active participant in the Círculo de Amigos del Arte, a large guild of artists and intellectuals sponsored by the painters Teodorico Quirós and Max Jiménez, which brought together noted members of the country's artistic elite of that period, such as Francisco Amighetti, Francisco Zúñiga, and Juan Manuel Sánchez Barrantes.

Between 1946 and 1947, González founded the Grupo Experimental, a theater group made up of students and professors at the University of Costa Rica. González also worked as a professor at the university's School of Fine Arts.

Forced to leave the country for political reasons in 1948, he traveled to Cuba and Venezuela, where he encountered contemporary artistic trends and a more global environment. He met internationally known artists, such as Jesús Rafael Soto, Lía Bermúdez, and Alejandro Otero, and taught at the Centro de Bellas Artes in Maracaibo, Venezuela, before returning to Costa Rica in 1958.

In 1961, González was one of the founders of Grupo Ocho, which brought together five other painters (Felo García, Harold Fonseca, Luis Daell, César Valverde Vega, and Guillermo Jiménez Sáenz) and two sculptors (Néstor Zeledón Guzmán and Hernán González Gutiérrez). The majority of the group's members had developed their craft abroad, bringing back what they had learned and fundamentally reshaping the Costa Rican art movement by introducing abstract art. Two years later, González was awarded the Aquileo J. Echeverría National Prize for painting.

As Grupo Ocho disbanded, alongside Carlos Moya, Rafael Ángel Fernández Piedra, and Claudio Carazo, González founded Grupo Taller, another artists' group that would grow to include Teresita Porras, Sonia Romero Carmona, Floria Pinto, and others. These artists, led by González, participated in multiple exhibitions both in Costa Rica and abroad.

During the first Bienal Centroamericana de Pintura in 1971, González exhibited his abstract paintings, bringing the Costa Rican public into contact with contemporary art for the first time. From 1972 to 1973, he taught at the University of Costa Rica's School of Architecture. In 1981, he was awarded the Magón National Prize for Culture, the highest honor given by the Costa Rican Ministry of Culture and Youth.

Between 1935 and 1986, González's work was exhibited in a great number of group and solo shows in Costa Rica, Cuba, Venezuela, and the United States. He died in San José in 1986, at age 77. A gallery at the Museo Dr. Rafael Ángel Calderón Guardia was named in his honor.
