= César Vega =

César Vega may refer to:

- César Vega (agronomist) (born 1962), Uruguayan agronomist and politician
- César Vega (footballer) (born 1959), Uruguayan football defender and coach
- César Valverde Vega (1928–1998), Costa Rican painter
