= Tomás Povedano =

Spanish painter active in Costa Rica (1847-1943)

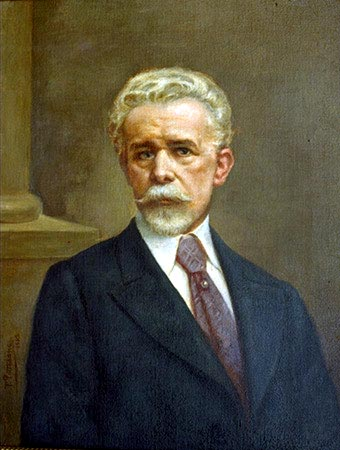
Povedano's self-portrait.

Tomás Povedano de Arcos (Lucena, Spain, September 22, 1847 — San José, Costa Rica 1943) was a Spanish painter, who spent much of his life in Costa Rica.

== Biography ==
He studied painting in Málaga and Seville, a city where he worked as an illustrator while he was a student at the Academy of Fine Arts and taught private drawing lessons. His artistic career began by decorating fans, which will be revealed later in a series of flower paintings and allegorical themes.

He collaborated with the movement that tried to establish the First Spanish Republic by writing in some media such as El Abanderado and El Baluarte; He was a volunteer militiaman and representative delegate of the Provincial Committee before the Municipal Committee of Republican Coalition. He was a Mason (he was even Venerable Master of the Respectful Lodge Hermes N. 7) and a theosophist.

In 1889-1891 he participated in the scientific, literary and artistic competitions of Seville and in 1889 he won a gold medal at the Universal Exhibition in Paris for a full-length portrait. That triumph contributes to winning the contest opened by the Legation of Ecuador to create a high school of plastic arts in Cuenca.

He arrived in that South American country in 1892 and founded the Academy of Fine Arts of Cuenca and also that of Guayaquil. During the time he remained in Ecuador he had important commissions for portraits.

He left Ecuador in 1896 to move to Mexico, but on the way he stopped in Costa Rica at the invitation of the Government. President Rafael Yglesias Castro hires him to organize the National School of Fine Arts, which is inaugurated on March 12 of the following year in San José.

Povedano served as director of said School until 1940, when the institution becomes part of the University of Costa Rica.

Impressed by the aborigines, Povedano painted pictures that reflect, idealized, the culture, history, art and physiognomy of the native population of America. He also made an important national-themed work that includes landscapes and customs. His mannerist Costumbrismo style influenced Costa Rican artists such as Teodorico Quirós and Max Jiménez.

In 1926 he was selected — along with Enrique Echandi, Ezequiel Jiménez and Emil Span — to represent Costa Rica in the 1925 Pan American Painting Exhibition, sponsored by the Los Angeles Museum of Art and held on its premises. He participated in the Exhibitions of Plastic Arts sponsored by the Diario de Costa Rica and was honorary president - along with Span, a German painter who also taught at the Povedano School - of the Art Center. He contributed to the decoration of the National Theater with three great oils: Art, Commerce and Industry.

He painted portraits of several presidents and members of important families in the country. Among the first, is José María Castro, who Luis Guillermo Solís, after assuming the presidency in 2014, placed in his office. He introduced watercolor in Costa Rica and showed interest in the flora of the country, painting, like Span, pictures of orchids and other native plants.

Povedano also made illustrations for texts such as the Silabario castellano by Porfirio Brenes, the newspaper La Tribuna, the Páginas ilustradas and El Fígaro, as well as for the Historical Booklet of Costa Rica, which, written by Ricardo Fernández Guardia, is the history manual more used in Costa Rican education during the 20th century.

A teacher of a large number of young Costa Ricans eager to devote themselves to the plastic arts, Povedano was a representative of the academic style, which prevailed in the early years of development of Costa Rican painting. A great defender of the existence of the institution he created, he managed to keep the doors of the School open even in the most pressing economic situations of the country. He stood out in the portrait — he represented some of the most important politicians and characters of Costa Rican society — and in landscapes, customary and decorative paintings.

His work was recognized with awards and distinctions, and after his death several important retrospectives have been organized.

He was the organizer of the Costa Rican theosophical movement and founder of the Virya Lodge (between 1905 and 1915 he directed the magazine of the same name), from which he derived the Dharana, which Roberto Brenes presided.

Povedano married first the Spanish Carolina Amores - with whom she had two children, María de la Cinta and Diego - and then with the Costa Rican María Esmeralda Inés de Jesús Loria Rivera (n. 12.10.1901); from the second marriage he had a daughter, María Elena (n. 25.06.1928).

== Fine arts school director ==
Povedano implemented academicism in the School he founded and was a consistent opponent of the new pictorial trends of the late nineteenth century and the avant-garde of the early twentieth century. Thus, he wrote that the works of synthesism, cubism, futurism and orphism were "studies of contemporary artistic pathology, [...] engenders of dementia, that it is not conceived how they could have been accepted for a moment without severe rejection in peoples who presume to go to the head of civilization ».

As an essay dedicated to the plastic arts exhibitions held in San José from 1928 to 1937 points out, the School of Fine Arts was an "academy entirely with its back to the renovating tendencies of the time. His works are aimed primarily at certain areas of social elite refinement".

Povedano students followed the copy of plasters and drawings that were part of the collection of classical sculptures and prints that the Government had acquired for teaching. It was a question of copying «the models imported from Europe with landscapes of an outdated arcadia». As for natural models, in addition to the portrait, still lifes prevailed: flowers, vegetables and fruits; Another frequent theme was the landscapes of lakes with roundabouts or swans, many of which "were archaic." "Hence, in some cartoons, many of Povedano's students were called" paints pillows and ribbons." And the absence of the Costa Rican was notorious, ”says the essay.

However, there is unanimity in recognizing their teaching skills. Povedano knew how to teach and possessed a very solid knowledge of pictorial techniques, which together with the fierce discipline he imposed gave good results.

== Numismatics ==
Several works by Povedano served as the basis for images that were later recorded on banknotes that circulated in Costa Rica. The first in which a portrait made by the Spanish artist was used is that of 10 colones from 1903, issued by the Anglo Costa Rican Bank. This is a charcoal drawing by Braulio Carrillo Colina, which had been published the previous year in the Magazine of Costa Rica. This portrait is the most reproduced in Costa Rican paper money: thus, it was re-engraved on the 5 colón banknotes of the National Bank of Costa Rica in the 1940s, and in others of the Central Bank in the 1950s and 1960s.

The portrait of José Rafael Gallegos, who ruled the country twice, was chosen to adorn the 1-colon bill of the Costa Rican Anglo in 1917, but it never went into circulation.

The influence of Povedano's drawings is clearly present in the image that illustrates the reverse of the 10-bank National Banknote of the F series of 1939: the engraving of the aboriginal chief is very similar to the cacique huetar that the painter made for the historical Primer of Costa Rica.

In 1938, Povedano made a pencil drawing of Juan de Cavallón (currently in the Visual Arts Collection of the Central Bank), which three years later would be reproduced by the engraver of the printing house Waterlow and Sons, London, on the ticket 20 colones of the National Bank, series E, in 1941.

In the same year and in the same bank, the 2-colon banknote, series E, was circulated, which had on its back the modified image of The Rescue of Dulcehé, an unfinished oil painting by Povedano. The engraver of the printing house made the pertinent changes to present a finished work: he drew the characters of the figures insinuated in the original work, modified some positions of others and added background elements, as explained by Manuel Chacón, curator of numismatics in the Museums of the Central Bank.

== Gallery ==
Presidents

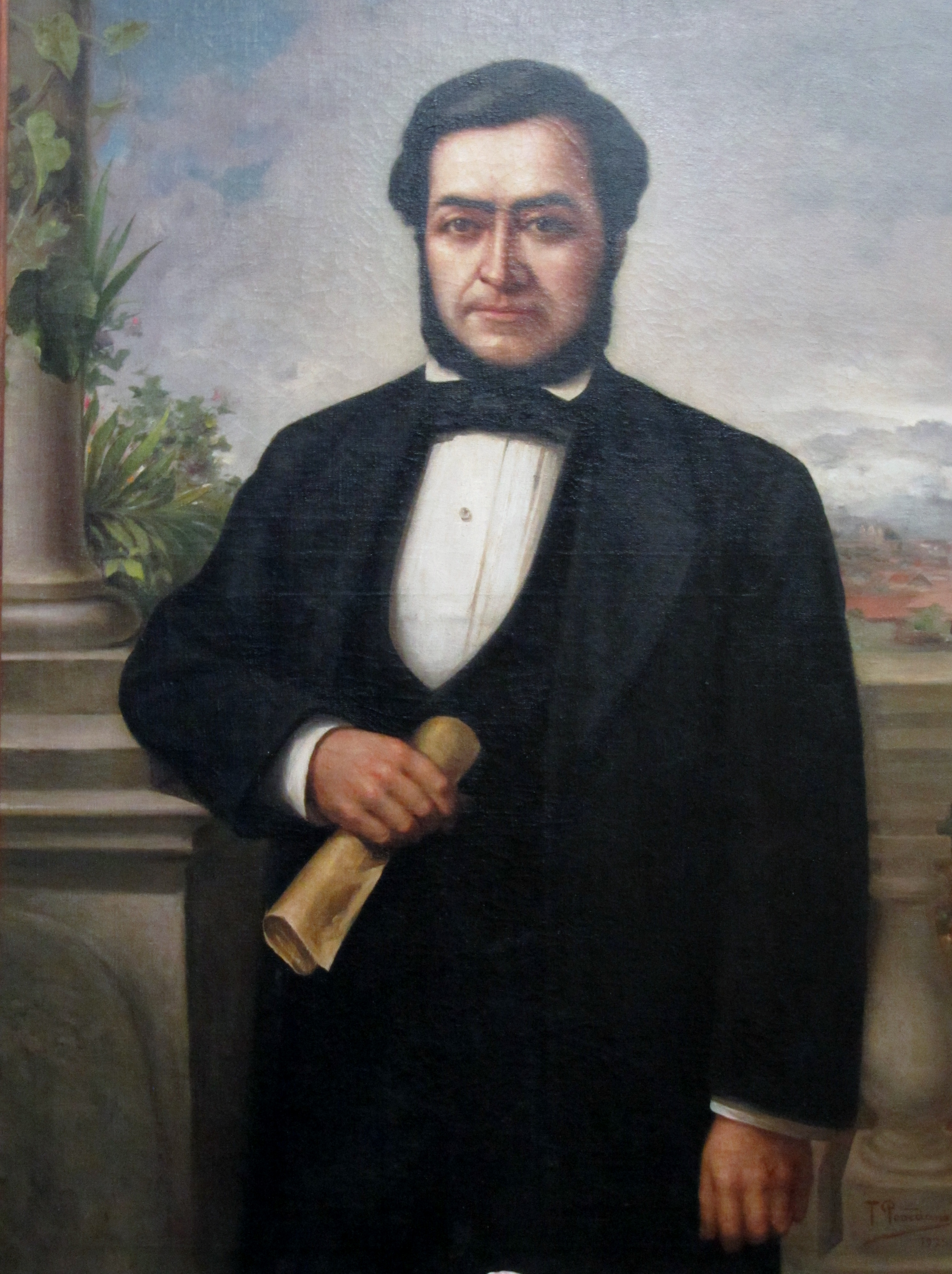
Juan Rafael Mora

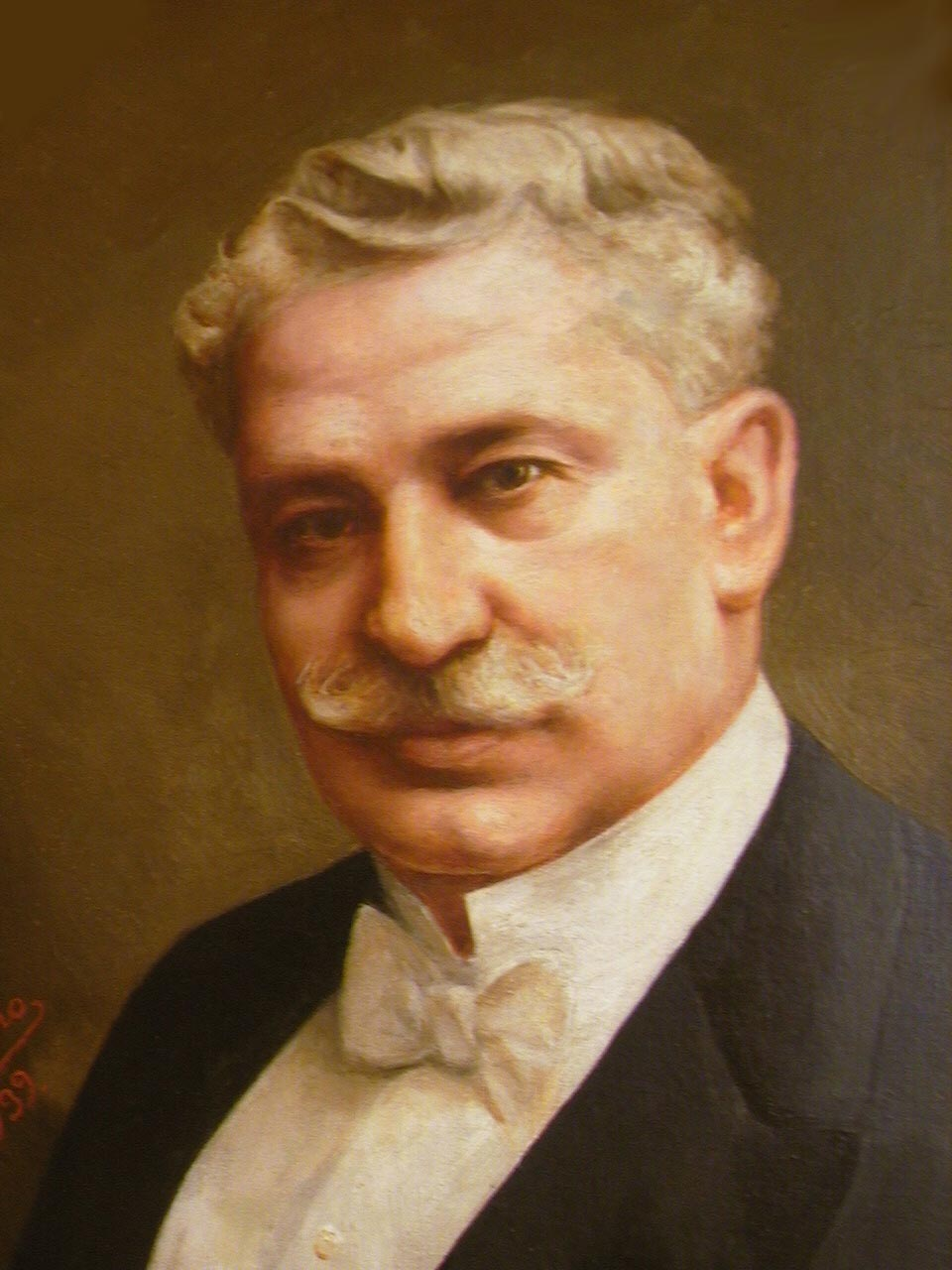
Julio Acosta García

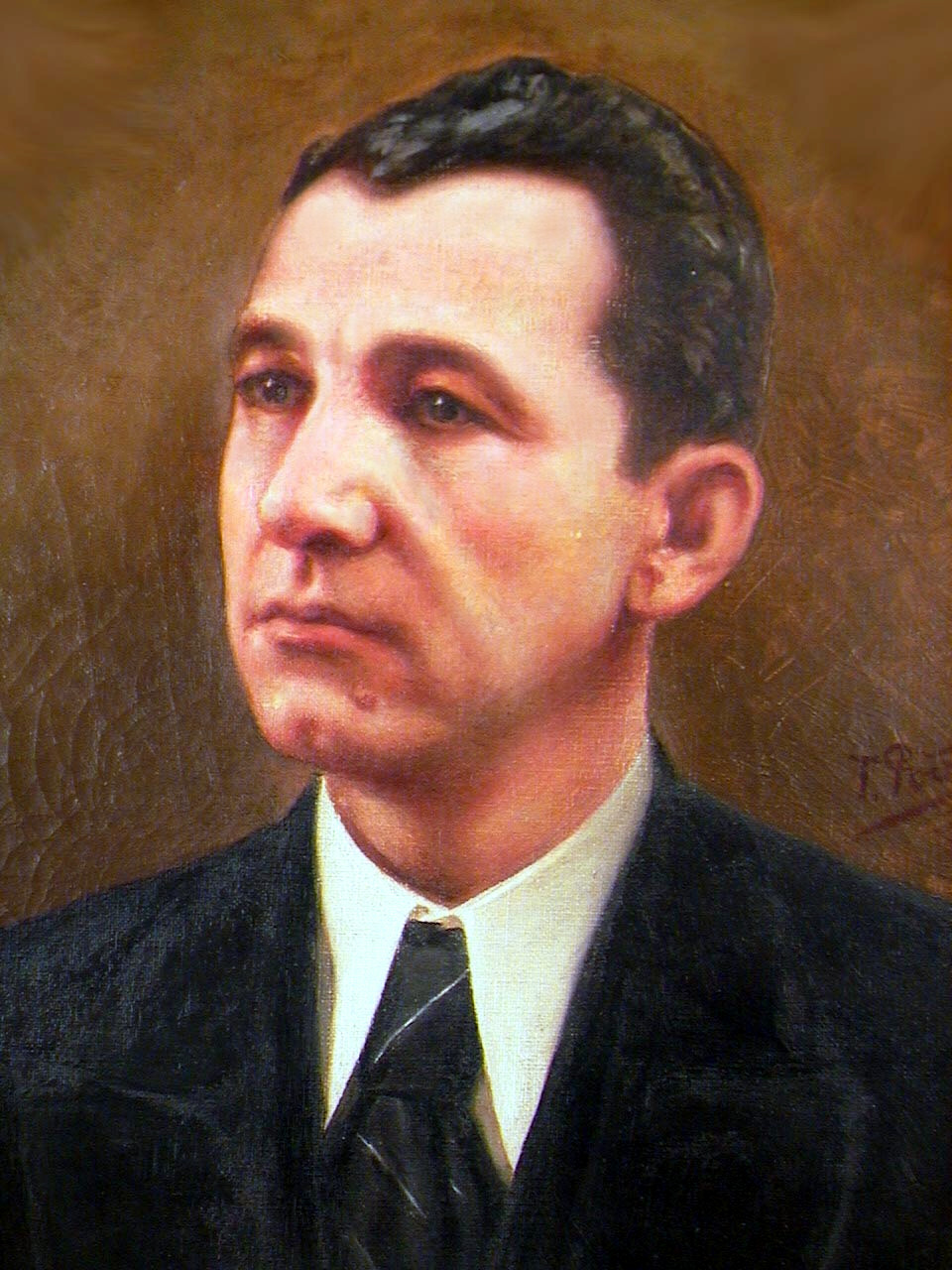
León Cortés Castro
National Theater

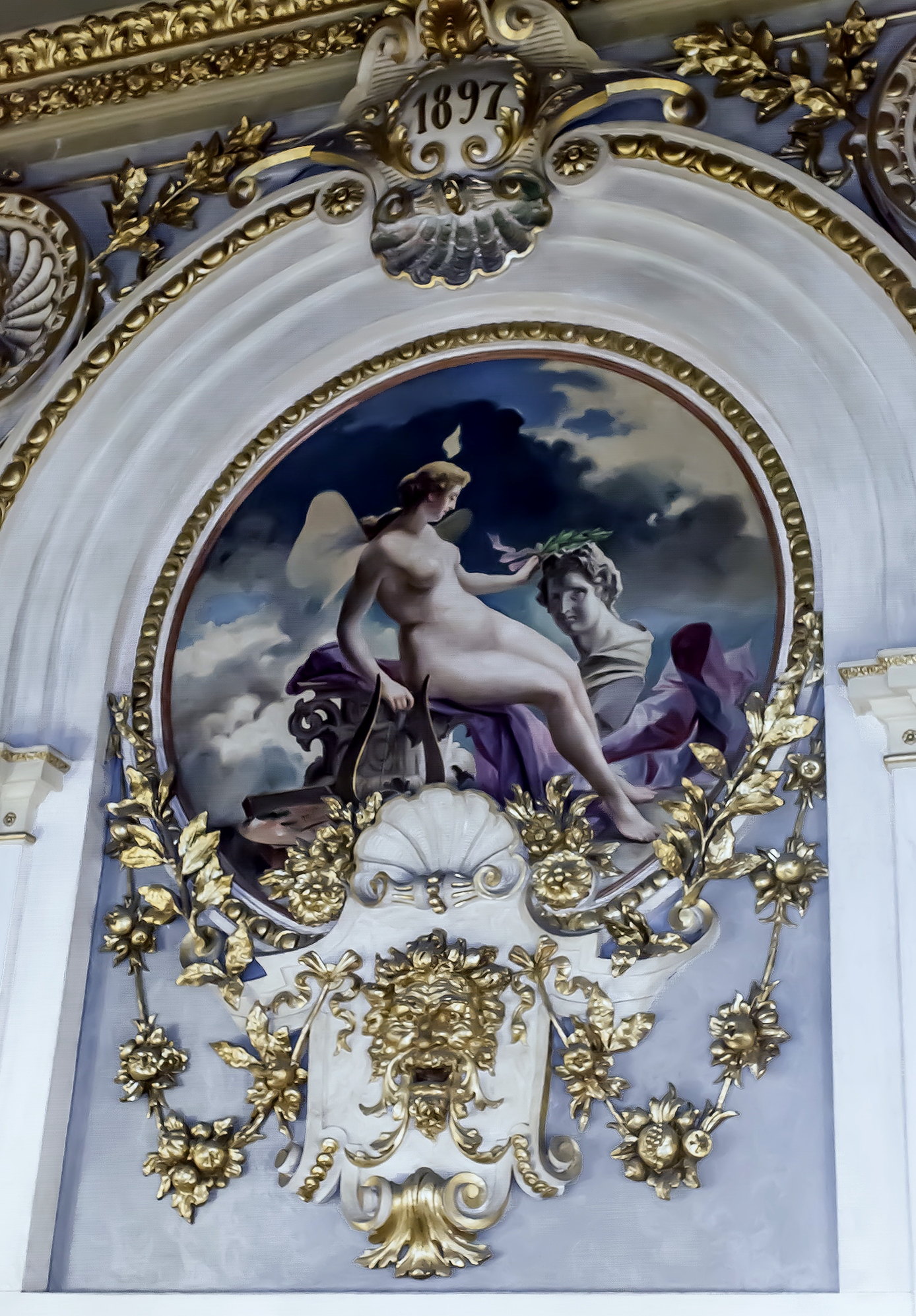
El arte

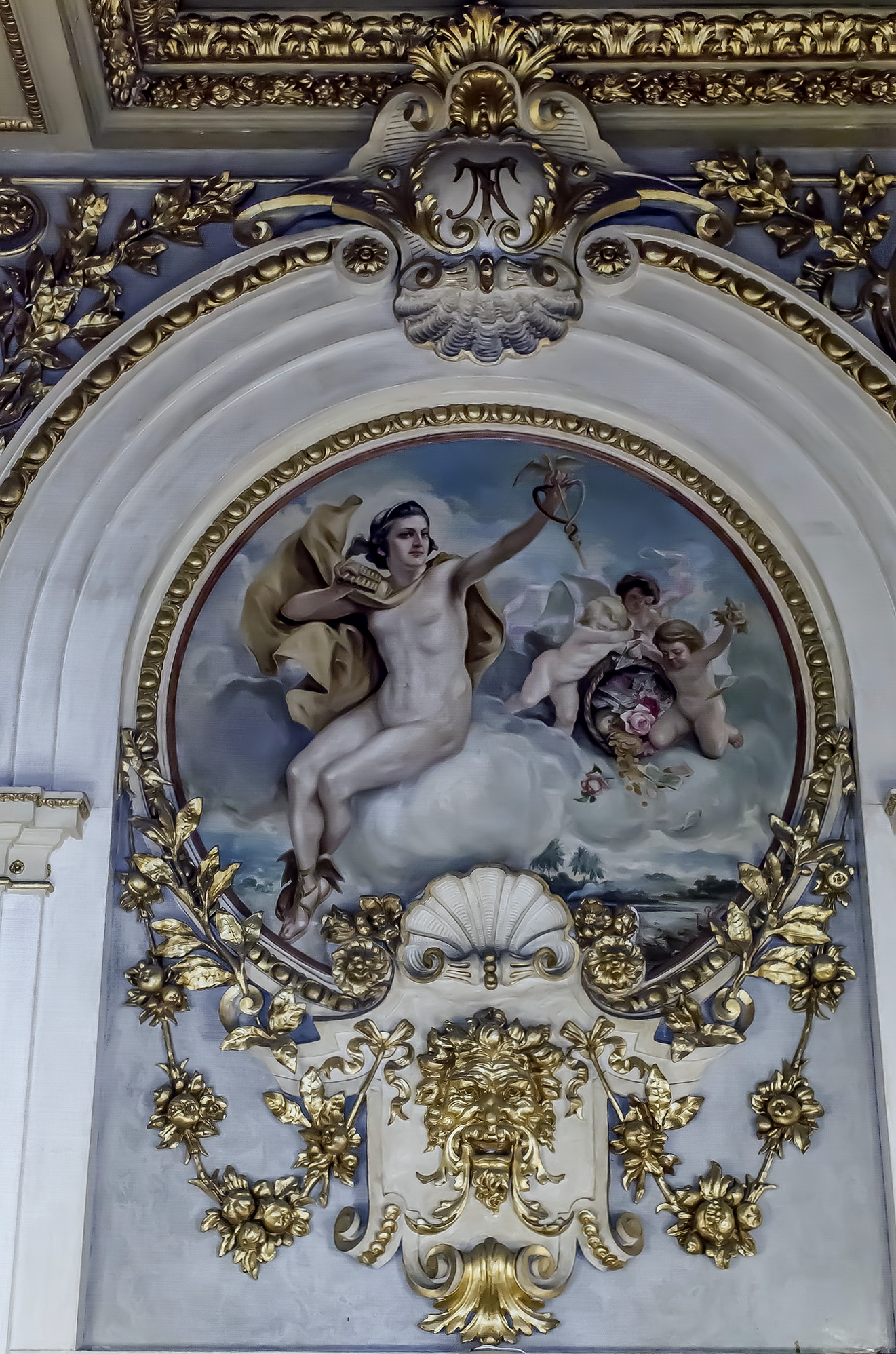
El comercio

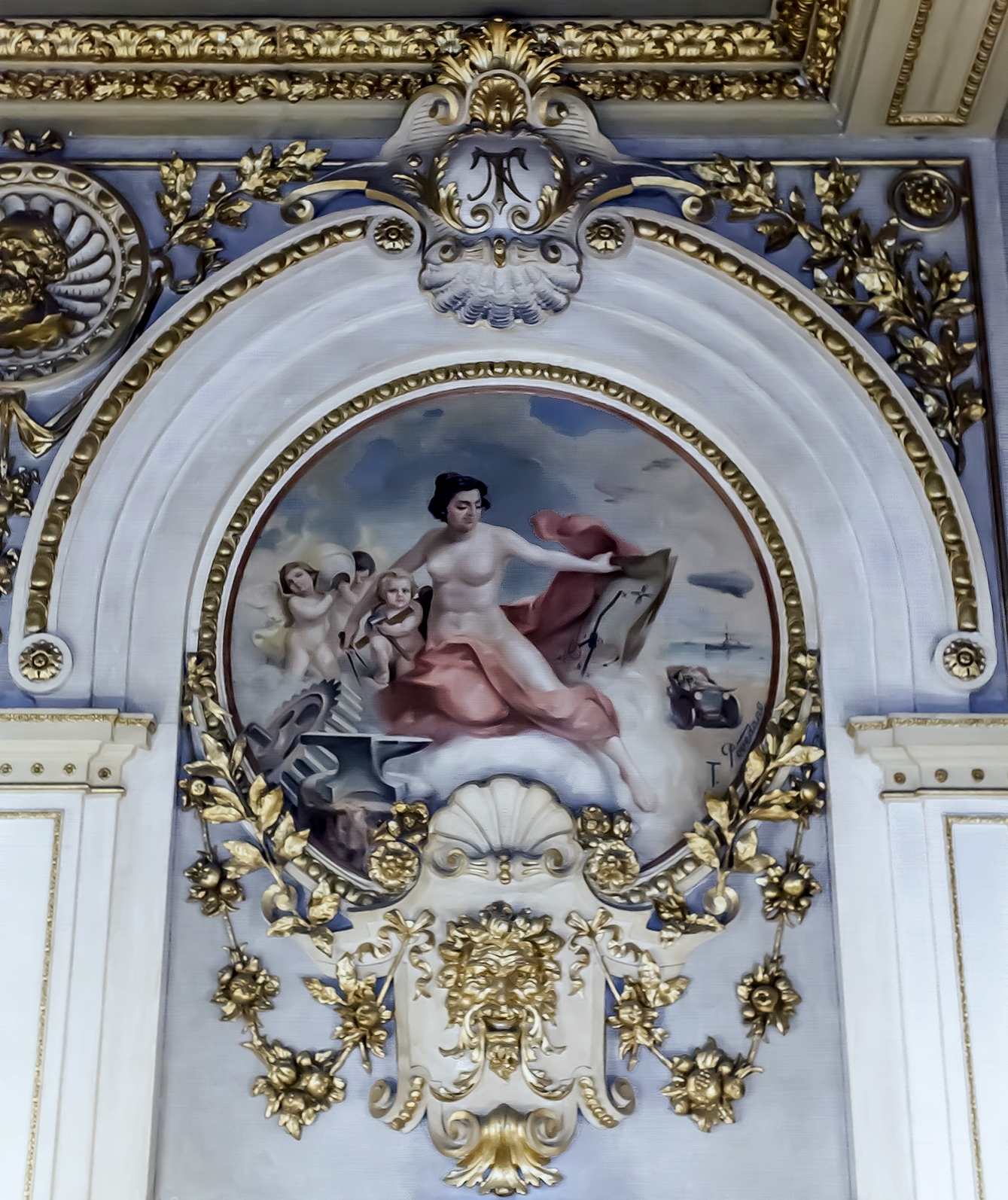
La industria
Other

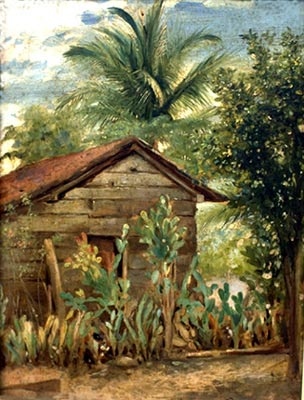
Casa campesina

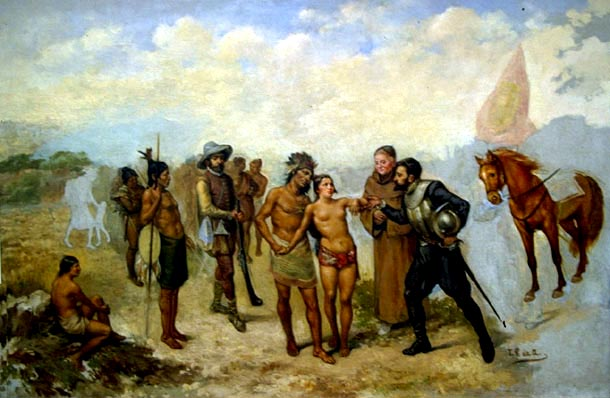
Rescate de Dulcehé

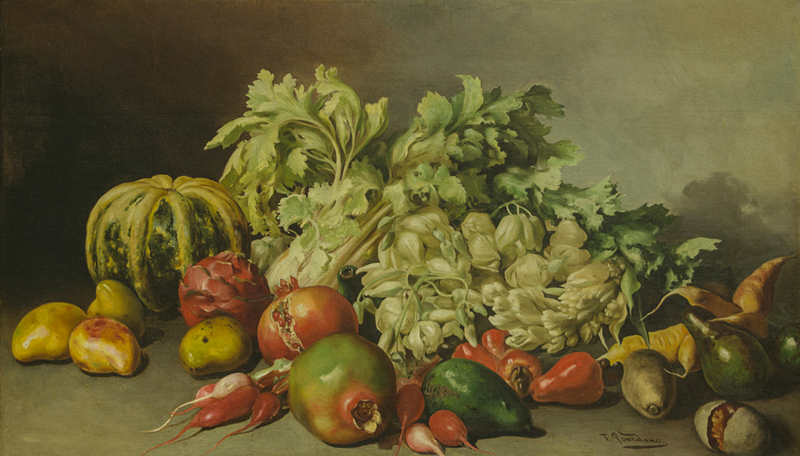
Verduras

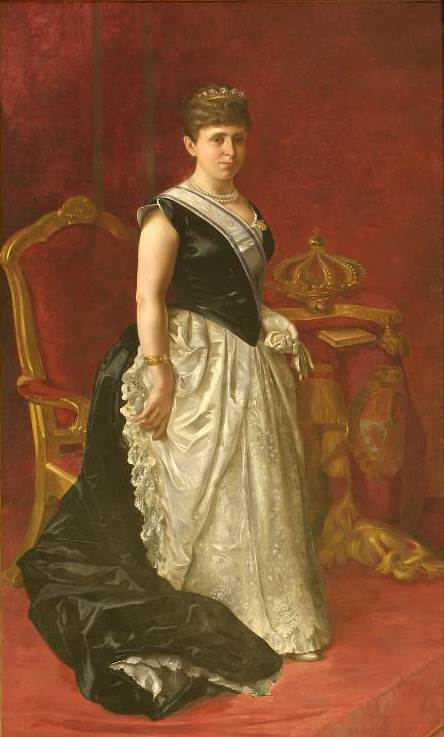
María Cristina de Austria
Warecolors

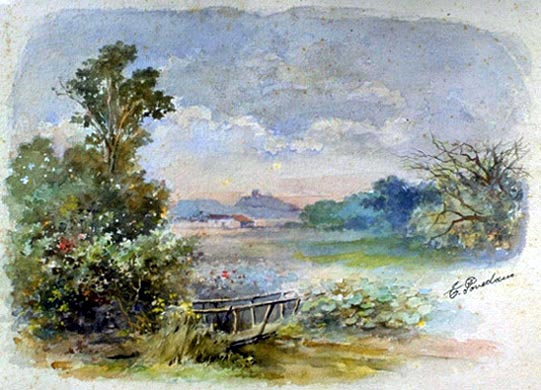
Paisaje

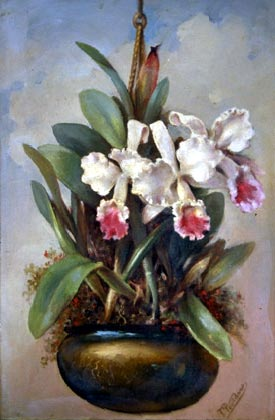
Guarias de Turrialba

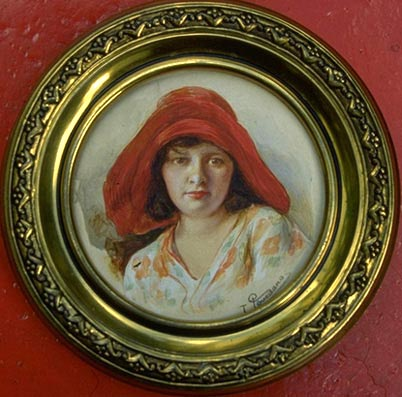
Retrato de Dora Loría
Bills

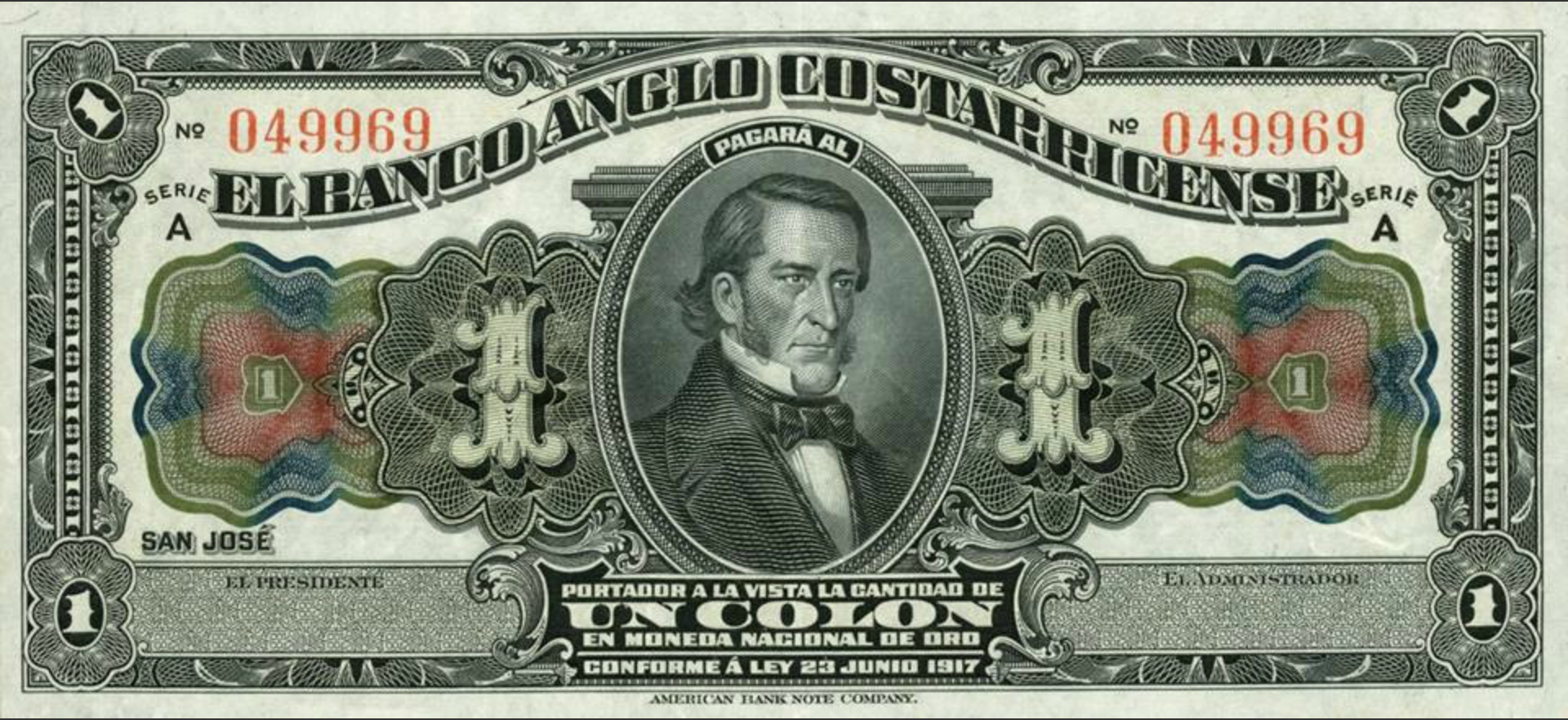
José Rafael Gallegos

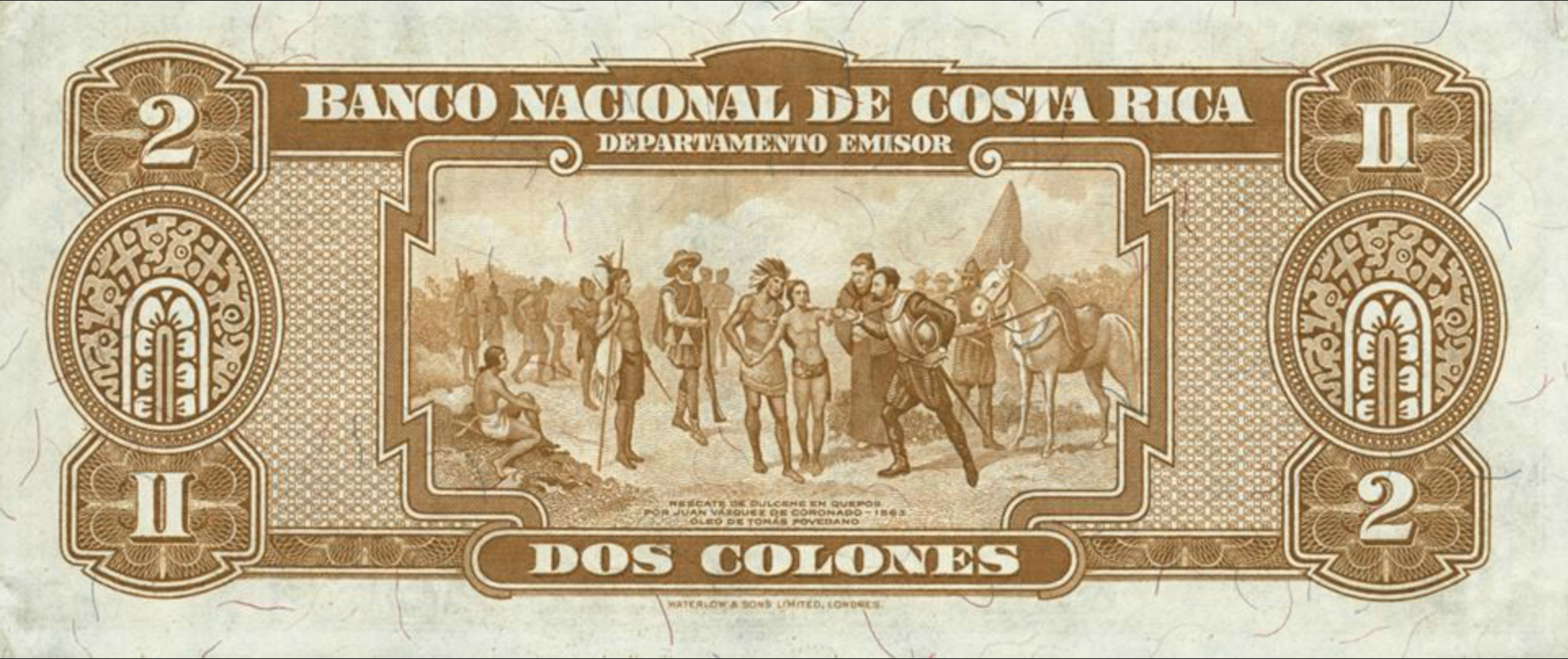
Rescate de Dulcehé

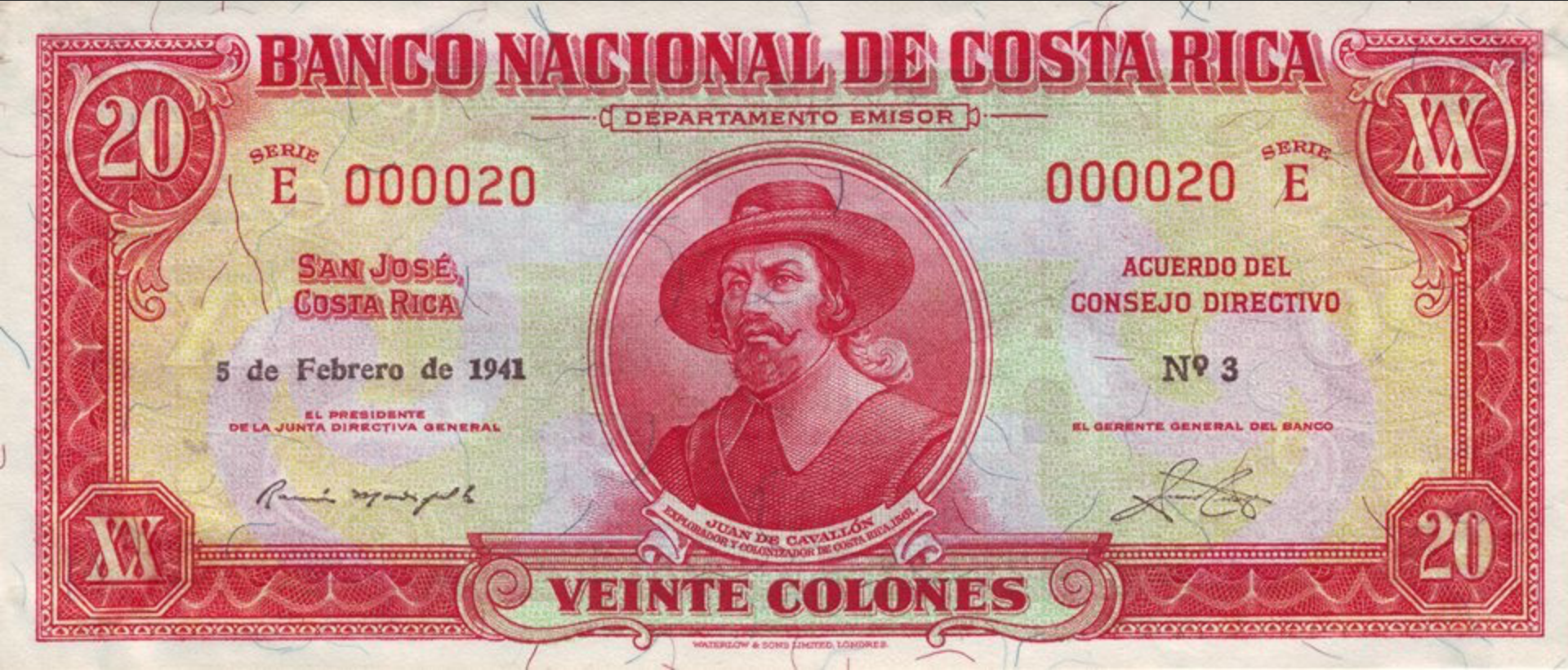
Juan de Cavallón

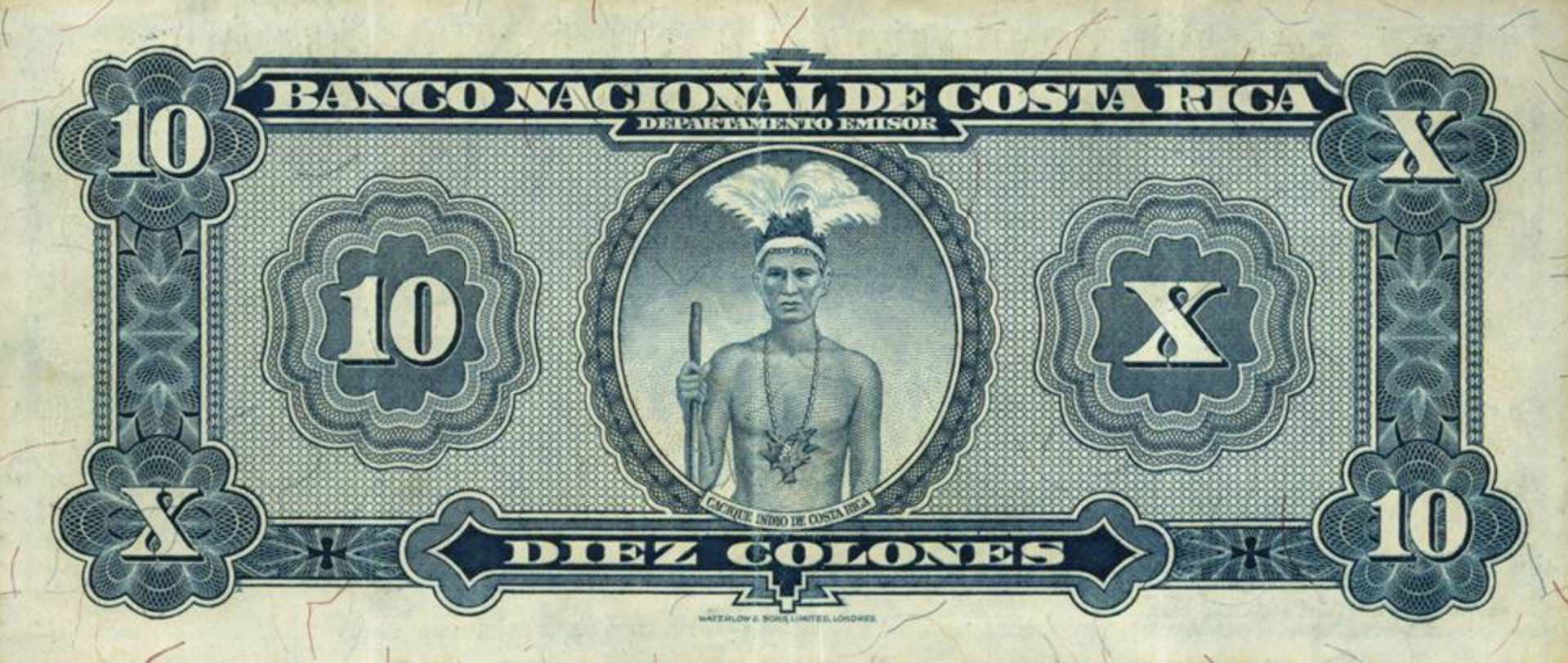
Cacique indio
