= Felo =

Felo may refer to:

== People ==
- Felo Ramírez (1923–2017), Cuban sports announcer
- Felo García (born 1928), Costa Rican architect, painter, and footballer
- Rafael Batista Hernández (born 1936), Spanish footballer
- Felo Maldonado (1938–2010), Puerto Rican baseball player and scout
- Felo (singer) (born 1952), Chilean troubadour and humorist
- Felo search, an AI.

== Other ==
- Felo de se, English common-law concept applied against the personal estates of those who ended their own lives
