= Costa Rican Museum of Art =

Art museum in Costa Rica

- Museo de Arte Costarricense

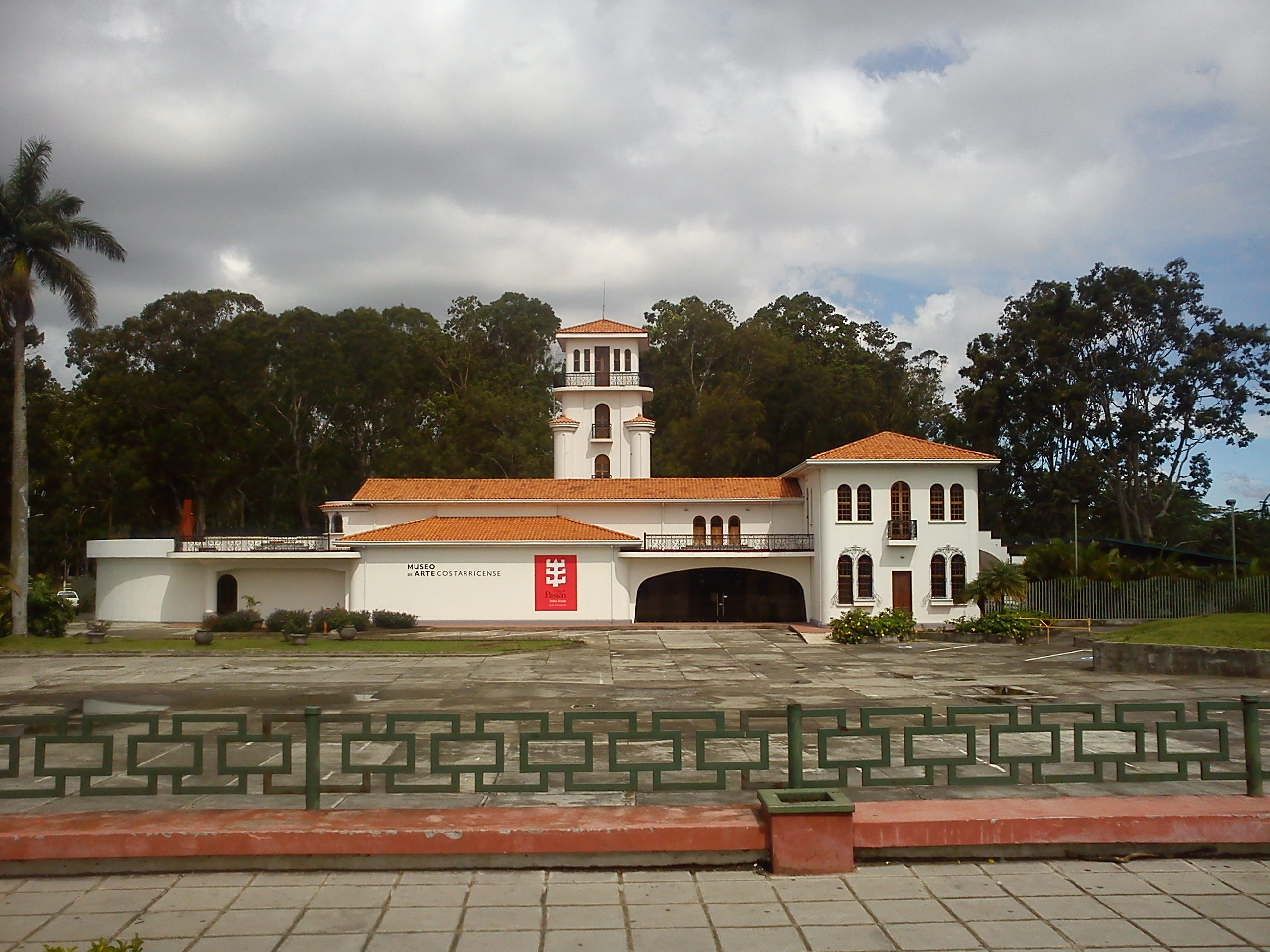
- Established: 3 May 1978; 47 years ago
- Location: San José, Costa Rica
- Coordinates: 9°56′07″N 84°05′57″W
- Type: Art museum
- Website: mac.go.cr
- Area: 10,800 m^{2} (116,300 sq ft)

The Costa Rican Museum of Art (Spanish: Museo de Arte Costarricense, MAC) is an art museum in San José, Costa Rica. It opened in 1978 and holds a collection of over 6000 artworks.

== History ==
The building that houses the MAC was originally the terminal building of La Sabana International Airport, which was built in 1937 and opened on 7 April 1940. The airport later transitioned to only receiving internal flights, and Juan Santamaría International Airport opened in 1958 for international traffic. In 1974 La Sabana airport closed, and in 1977 the land was dedicated to La Sabana Metropolitan Park.

The MAC opened in the old terminal building on 3 May 1978. In 1986 the building was named "architectural heritage of Costa Rica." It was renovated in the late 2000s, and reopened again in October 2011.

== Collection and exhibitions ==
As of 2011, MAC had a collection of 6000 artworks, but only space to exhibit 150 at a time. Initially the museum focused on acquiring artworks from the mid-1800s to the early 1900s, but now its collection includes works up to the present day.

On display in the museum is Francisco Amighetti's 1948 mural Agriculture, commemorating the Costa Rican Civil War. The collection also includes works by expressionist painter Teodorico Quirós, abstract painter Lola Fernández, sculptor Juan Rafael Chacón, and a mural by Louis Féron.

The "first major retrospective" of Max Jiménez's work was held at the Museo de Arte Costarricense in 1999. In 2024 the MAC held the first exhibition of Carlos Cruz-Diez's artwork in Central America, as well as an exhibition of artworks depicting the Guanacaste Province of Costa Rica.
