= Teodorico Quirós =

Costa Rican expressionist painter (1897–1977)

- Portrait in 1974
- Born: 28 August 1897; San José, Costa Rica
- Died: 27 July 1977 (aged 79); San José, Costa Rica
- Known for: Painting, murals, architecture
- Style: Post-impressionism; expressionism
- Movement: Nationalist; Post-war; New Sensibility
- Spouse: María Ponce

Teodorico Quirós Alvarado (28 August 1897 – 27 July 1977) was a Costa Rican expressionist painter, muralist, and architect. He is considered one of the most influential painters from Costa Rica.

He designed numerous public buildings, including a large number of churches, considered to be of great architectural value. The architecture library at the University of Costa Rica is named after him, and the Costa Rican Museum of Art established the Teodorico Quirós Prize in 1998 in his honor.

== Early life and education ==
Quirós was born in San José, Costa Rica in 1897, the son of Antonio Quirós Morales and Clotilde Alvarado González. His mother was a pianist and taught him to play, instilling in him her love of music. From a young age, he showed a talent for drawing, and at the age of seven, he enrolled in the National School of Fine Arts, where he received instruction from eminent painters such as Tomás Povedano, John Koch, and Enrique Echandi.

He completed his secondary education at the Colegio Seminario (1905) and later at the Liceo de Costa Rica, where he earned his high school diploma in 1915. The following year, he began studying architectural engineering at the Massachusetts Institute of Technology (MIT), graduating in 1919. He was exposed to novel trends in design and painting while in post-war Cambridge, Massachusetts.

== Artistic career ==
In September 1920, Quirós returned to Costa Rica and joined a wave of young artists with nationalist sensibilities in modern art and design. Together with number of other national artists including Francisco Zúñiga and Fausto Pacheco, he helped create the so-called New Sensibility movement in Costa Rican painting. He took on a number of teaching positions in rural towns, allowing him to study the countryside and vernacular architecture. Quirós early paintings were dominated by landscapes of the Central Plateau and his preferred architectural form, the adobe house. He preferred to use oil paint, whose impasto and firmness allowed him to create more solid compositions, delineated in several planes and with a wide range of colors. In this way, he took painting out of the studio and into the countryside, into the rural landscape, influenced by the French impressionists. With no dominant single ideology or interest in depicting social themes, his work was based on a stark impressionist interpretation of Costa Rican landscapes.

He initially painted in the academic, mannerist Costumbrismo style introduced by the Spanish painter Tomás Povedano in the early 20th century and showed a strong emphasis on color. This approach was characteristic of artists in the exhibiting society Círculo de Amigos del Arte (Circle of Friends of Art), which Quirós co-founded with Max Jiménez in 1928. The society acted as a large guild of artists and intellectuals sponsored and brought together noted members of the Costa Rica's artistic elite of the period, including Francisco Amighetti, Zúñiga, and Barrantes. From then until 1937, he helped organize the group’s exhibitions, energizing artistic activity across the country. He also worked with Manuel de la Cruz González on a mural for the society’s meeting place, Las Arcadas in San José, and painted another mural for the Colegio Superior Señoritas (Girls' High School) in 1932.

With the collaboration of Carlota Brenes and the sponsorship of the newspaper Diario de Costa Rica, he organized and selected the first works that launched the important Diario de Costa Rica Fine Arts Exhibitions in 1937, held in the foyer of the National Theatre of Costa Rica. These exhibitions generated a strong, innovative artistic movement with a significant national impact. In 1934, he joined the Circle of Friends of Art. Together with Manuel de la Cruz González, he collaborated on the first mural depicting local customs in San José.

He served as dean of the Faculty of Fine Arts at the University of Costa Rica from 1940 to 1944, a position he used to reform the school's curriculum. In 1945, he was appointed cultural attaché to Mexico, a post that allowed him to paint various aspects of the capital city in compositions characterized by geometric forms and luminous contrasts. Between 1952 and 1953, he traveled to the United States and Europe, painting works on a variety of subjects, including nudes, portraits, and twelve paintings of Chorotega indigenous culture.

Around 1955 and 1956, his paintings began to take on an expressionist style, and he produced some of his most influential works. He created the Popol Vuh murals, featuring indigenous motifs depicted in a somber atmosphere of dark tones.

In 1971, he was made director of architectural heritage at the Ministry of Culture. Under his leadership, the government of Costa Rica began to list and protect vernacular and adobe buildings in addition to colonial era edifices.

He died in San José in 1977, aged 79. He was married to María Ponce.

== Legacy ==
Teodorico Quirós is considered one of the most important painters of the nationalist generation of Costa Rican art. His post-impressionist and expressionist depictions of landscapes and indigenous people in Costa Rica have remained influential for decades. The expressionist style of New Sensibility artists of the 1930s generation, including Quirós, remained a norm for artists in Costa Rica until the late 1950s, when Post-expressionist painters like Manuel de la Cruz González, Lola Fernández, and Felo García developed a wave of abstract painting.

His major architectural works of his include the San Isidro Church, Curridabat Cathedral, Chapel of Souls, and San Rafael de Escazú Church. The library of the School of Architecture at the University of Costa Rica bears his name.

In 1998, the Costa Rican Museum of Art established the Teodorico Quirós Prize in his honor.

== See also ==
- Culture of Costa Rica
- Latin American art
- Expressionism
