= Parroquia San Antonio de Padua =

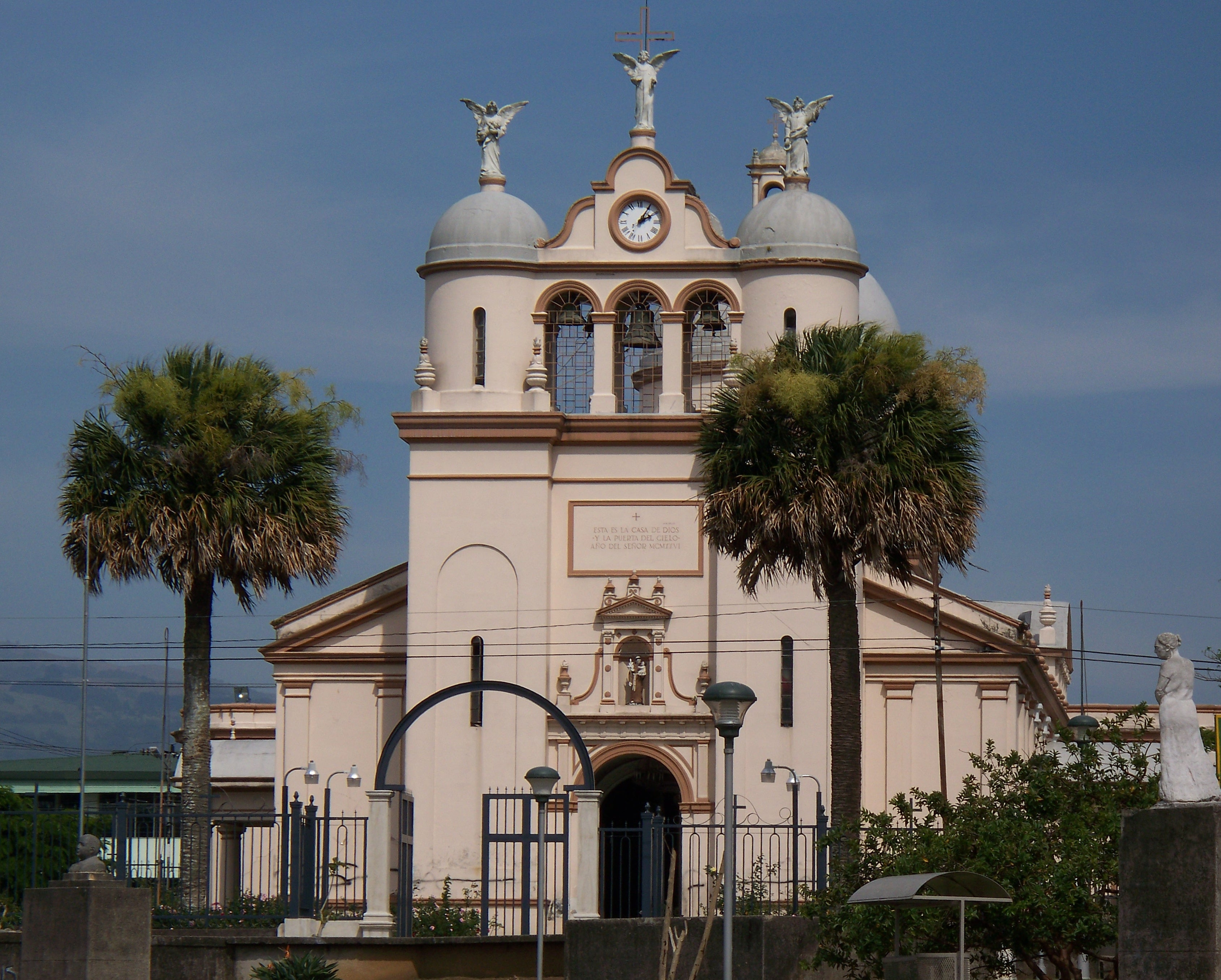
- Curridabat Cathedral

Religion
- Affiliation: Roman Catholic
- Ecclesiastical or organisational status: Parish church
- Year consecrated: 1638

Location
- Location: Costa Rica
- Interactive map of Parroquia San Antonio de Padua
- Coordinates: 9°54′51″N 84°2′14″W

Architecture
- Architect: Teodorico Quirós
- Style: Spanish Colonial Revival
- Groundbreaking: 1926
- Completed: 1933

The Parroquia San Antonio de Padua, commonly known as the Iglesia de Curridabat is a church located in Curridabat, Costa Rica.

== History ==
It is one of the oldest parishes in the countries, with over 400 years of history. The first church in Curridabat was a temporary structure erected by two Franciscan friars, who had assisted in the evangelization of Barva and Aserrí and who wished now to convert the people of Cacique Currirava. Later, a small adobe church replaced the older wooden structure. In 1676 the church was dedicated to Saint Anthony of Padua. The parochial archives were destroyed in 1830 in a fire.

In 1833, Curridabat was raised to an independent parish. In 1835, during the League War, the forces from Cartago, commandeered the church. It was the depository of the statue of the Black Madonna, patron saint of Costa Rica (and which today resides in the Basilica de los Ángeles). When they lost the battle, the statue was removed to San José as a spoil of war.

The church was destroyed by an earthquake in 1841, and again in 1910. It was then demolished in 1923, when Curridabat's resident priest, Anselmo Palacios, decided to construct a new church. He enlisted Costa Rican architect Teodorico Quirós to design the church, and it was completed in 1933.

Major repairs were initiated in 2007.
