= Louis Feron =

Louis Féron (1901 – 28 March 1998) was a French-born sculptor, chaser, gold- and silversmith.

== Biography ==
He was born in Rouen, Normandy, and apprenticed in Paris in the Volk Bronze Figure Workshop as a figure and ornament ciseleur.

== Artistic work ==
In 1933, he won the title of "Best chaser, gold- and silversmith of France" for a goldsmith work called Head of Jean, now on permanent collection in the Museum of Fine Arts, Boston. He was named Commande de l’Ordre du Travail by the French government and decorated in the Sorbonne. He immigrated to Costa Rica during the Great Depression, living and working there from 1934 – 1945, where he ran his own workshop. In 1935 he was appointed professor at the Public Works School in Costa Rica. From 1939 – 1940, he created the Salón Dorado (Golden Room) in what was then La Sabana International Airport Diplomat Lounge, now part of the Costa Rican Museum of Art. This is a stucco-and-bas-relief mural covering 150 square meters and representing major events and periods in Costa Rican history from pre-Columbian times up to 1940. In 1987 he received a commendation from the Costa Rican government for his "great contribution to the artistic and cultural heritage of the nation."

Féron left Costa Rica for New York City in 1945, and he became an American citizen in 1951. In the United States he designed and created sacred vessels, jewelry, and sculpture for private clients as well as for the firms Rubel, Van Cleef and Arpels, Verdura, Schlumberger, Bronzini, Cartier, David Web, Tiffany & Company and Steuben Glass Works. His work has been accepted in the collections of Musee d’Art Moderne, Paris, Museum of Fine Arts, Boston; Currier Museum of Art, Manchester, NH; the Virginia Museum, Richmond, VA; and the Cathedral of Detroit, MI.

Féron created the likeness of 1989 Indianapolis 500 winner Emerson Fittipaldi that was affixed to the Borg-Warner Trophy.

Féron married the dancer Leslie Snow in 1962 and established a workshop in New Hampshire. In 1977, he was awarded an honorary Doctor of Humane letter by Plymouth State College. In 1995, thirty-five of his pieces formed an exhibit at the Musée des Arts Décoratifs in Paris. Féron taught a number of prominent artists over the years, many of whom maintain their own workshops and carry on his traditions, including Pierre Etienne Lahaussois and Carvin French.
