= César Valverde Vega =

Costa Rican painter & writer (1928–1998)

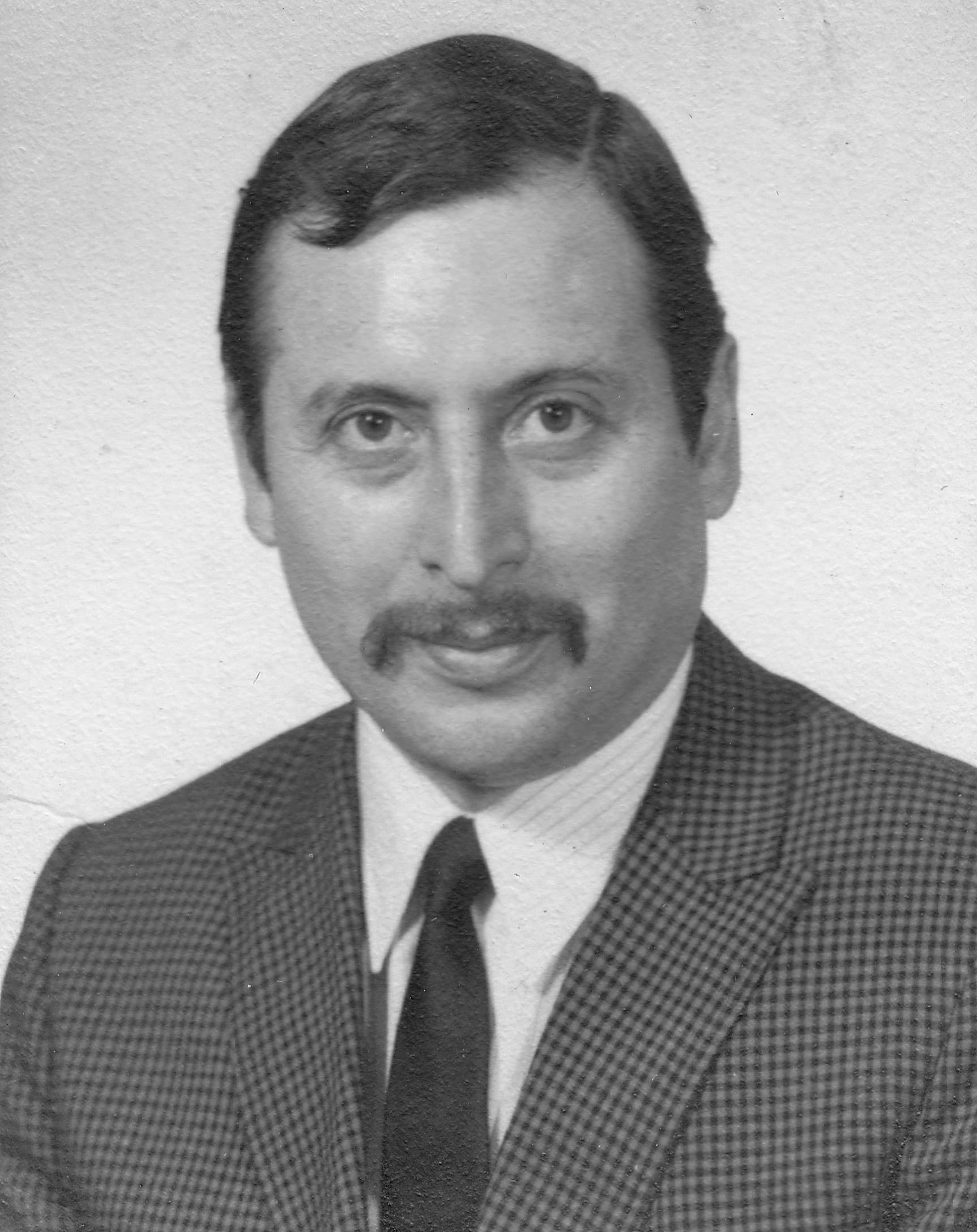
Vega in 1965

César Valverde Vega (8 March 1928 – 3 December 1998) was a Costa Rican painter, writer and lawyer. He was also a planner, public official and diplomat. He was one of the first muralists in Costa Rica and a member of Grupo Ocho (Group Eight), a group of Costa Rican artists who introduced abstract art to Costa Rica in the 1960s, which generated an artistic revolution in the national medium. Professor and later director of Plastic Arts at the University of Costa Rica, he was vice minister of Culture during the administration of Rodrigo Carazo Odio (1978-1982), received the "Premio Nacional Aquileo J. Echeverría" prize for painting on three occasions, and wrote several books, including a short novel. He is considered one of the great masters of the avant-garde of Costa Rican art.

== Biography ==
César Valverde Vega was born on 8 March 1928 in El Carmen, San José, Costa Rica. His parents were César Valverde Monestel and Hilma Vega Jiménez. His father traveled to New York before he was born, so he and his mother traveled to the United States in 1930 to look for him. Back in Costa Rica, he studied primary school at the Buenaventura Corrales School, where he first became interested in painting. He attended primary school at Escuela Buenaventura Corrales, where he first became interested in painting. His teacher taught him various art techniques including oil painting and serigraphy, where he showed great interest. Middle and high school at the Colegio Seminario, from which he graduated in 1945.

At the University of Costa Rica, he chose to study law, partially due to his fathers influence who didn't see painting as a sustainable career path. He ended up studying fine arts in addition to his work in law and eventually finishing this degree as well. He obtained a law degree from the University of Madrid, Spain, with postgraduate degrees in Administration and Economic Development at the University of Manchester, England, and at the IEDES of the University of Paris. Moreover, he also studied art in Italy thanks to a scholarship at the Academia delle Belle Arti and the Scuola de Nudo Roma, in England at the Regional School of Art in Manchester, and in the United States at the Corcoran School of Art in Washington. He married Dorothy Stark Stabler in 1962 and had three children (Giovanna, César and Rocío).

He worked for several years in the Planning Office of the Costa Rican government, before being able to dedicate himself fully to painting in the 1970s. He was a professor of fine arts at the University of Costa Rica and served as Director there in the mid 70s.

He was Vice Minister of Culture in the government of Rodrigo Carazo from 1978 to 1982, in addition to holding other diplomatic positions such as an OAS International Advisor and in the Consul of Costa Rica in Canada. He received the National Painting Award three times, and painted murals in various places in the Costa Rican capital, including the Legislative Assembly, the Comptroller General of the Republic, the Bar Association, the National Registry, the Dr. Marcial Rodríguez Clinic, the Anglo Bank, the Jade Museum and the UACA.

Valverde published several books, the first being "Los murales de César Valverde" (L'Atelier, 1990), about his work. A short novel: The "La feliz indolencia" (happy indolence) (Editorial Costa Rica, 1982). And three books of essays: "Más en broma que en serio" (More in jest than in seriousness) (Editorial Costa Rica, 1977); "Ensayos para pensar o sonreír" (Essays to think or smile about) (Ministry of Culture, Youth and Sports, 1982); and "Sonreír otra vez" (Smile again) (Juricentro, 1990).

He died of peritonitis in 1998, the same year as other renowned Costa Rican artists such as Francisco Zúñiga, Francisco Amighetti and Luis Daell.

== Works ==
=== Plastic-Arts ===
"In my painting, women have been a constant. The female form represents the human race and its forms allow me to plastically resolve my ideal of beauty." (César Valverde Vega)

César Valverde Vega was one of the members of Grupo Ocho (Group Eight), an artistic movement that introduced abstract art to Costa Rica in the 1960s. This group was made up of six painters (Valverde, Luis Daell, Harold Fonseca, Rafael Ángel García, Manuel de la Cruz González and Guillermo Jiménez Sáenz) and two sculptors (Néstor Zeledón Guzmán and Hernán González Gutiérrez). This movement allowed an awakening of the plastic arts environment in Costa Rica but had a difficult task in getting the public to understand and accept contemporary art.

Valverde's work began with the oil painting technique, in addition to using mixed techniques and silkscreens, focusing his artistic expression on the aesthetic part, so that the paintings radiate order, measure and conscious rhythm, seeking the ideal of beauty as opposed to the unpleasant elements of reality. Within his artistic activity, the feminine theme was a constant. His mural pictorial work is of great relevance. Valverde considered that art was the heritage of the people, so that all Costa Ricans should have access to it, hence the abundance of his frescoes on several walls of public buildings in Costa Rica.

His work as an artist earned him 11 national and international awards, including the "Orden Cleto González Víquez" of the Council of San José (1997), which also declared him "Hijo Predilecto de la ciudad de San José" (Esteemed Son of the city of San José), the " Internazionales D'Arte e Cultura de Roma" award (Italy, 1994), the "Premio Nacional de Pintura" (National Painting Prize) on three occasions (1969, 1974 and 1984) and the Áncora prize (1980).

He held exhibitions of his works at the National Museum of Bogotá, Colombia, the Iturbide Palace in Mexico, the Central Bank Museums in Costa Rica, the Miraflores Art Gallery in New York and the Casa Argentina in Rome.

=== Literature ===
The themes of his books are the amenity and problems of everyday life. He defined himself as an admirer of Franz Kafka, Fyodor Dostoevsky and Albert Camus. His only novel was "Happy Indolence" ("La feliz indolencia"), published in 1982, about an adventurous character both in deeply immersed in love and profession, about the search for identity in a superficial world. His essays are compilations of various publications in the opinion section of the newspaper La Nación, of which he was a contributor.
