= Emil Span =

German painter in Costa Rica

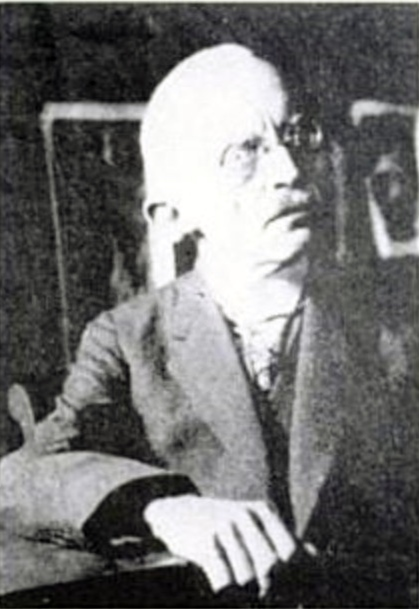
- Born: January 27, 1869; Reutlingen, Kingdom of Württemberg
- Died: January 20, 1944 (aged 74); San José, Costa Rica
- Education: Academy of Fine Arts, Munich
- Known for: Painting

Emil Span (January 27, 1869 – January 20, 1944), also known as Emilio Span, was a German painter based in Costa Rica. He is well known in the Central American nation for his landscapes and, especially, his paintings of orchids.

== Early life ==
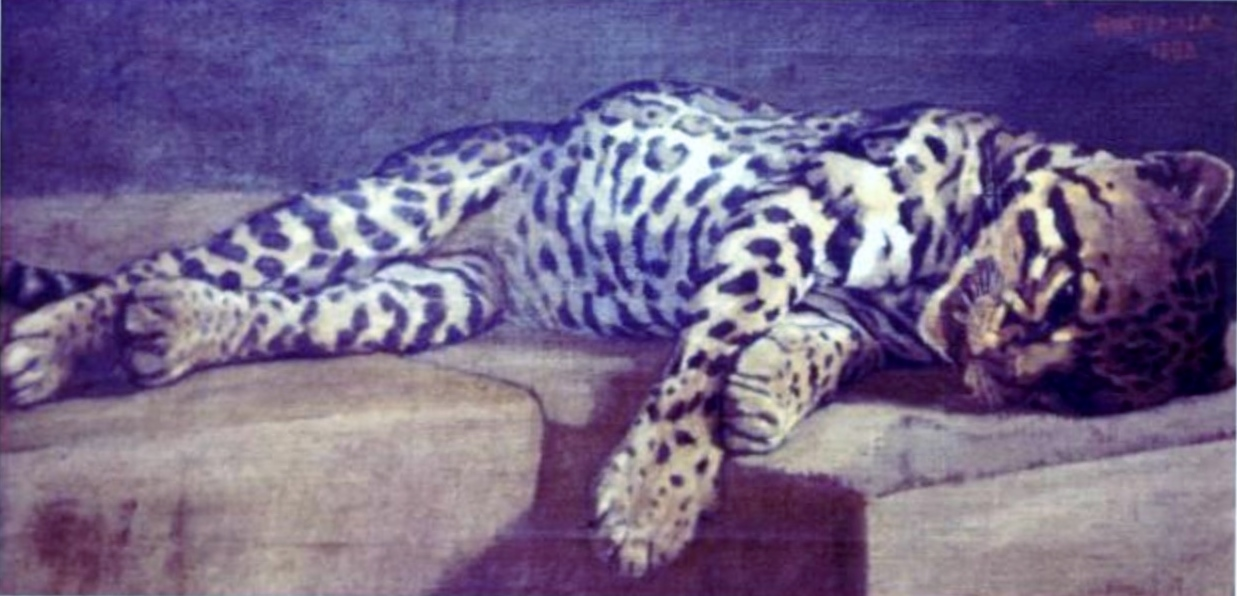
Ocelote, Emil Span, oil on canvas, 1898

Emil Span was born in Reutlingen, in what was then the Kingdom of Württemberg, in 1869. He studied at the Academy of Fine Arts, Munich.

Toward the end of the 19th century, Span traveled to Guatemala, where he hoped to become involved in coffee exporting. While there, he painted various landscapes, portraits of Indigenous people, and pictures of animals, such as the oil Ocelote (1898). However, due to difficulties with a Guatemalan general, he was forced to leave the country.

== Career in Costa Rica ==
In 1906, Span arrived in Costa Rica, where he began taking commissions and teaching. His first commissions were of portraits: He painted clergy members, intellectuals, and historic figures. Span was "a driving force behind the nation's art movement with his solid knowledge and work as an educator," according to the academic María Enriqueta Guardia.

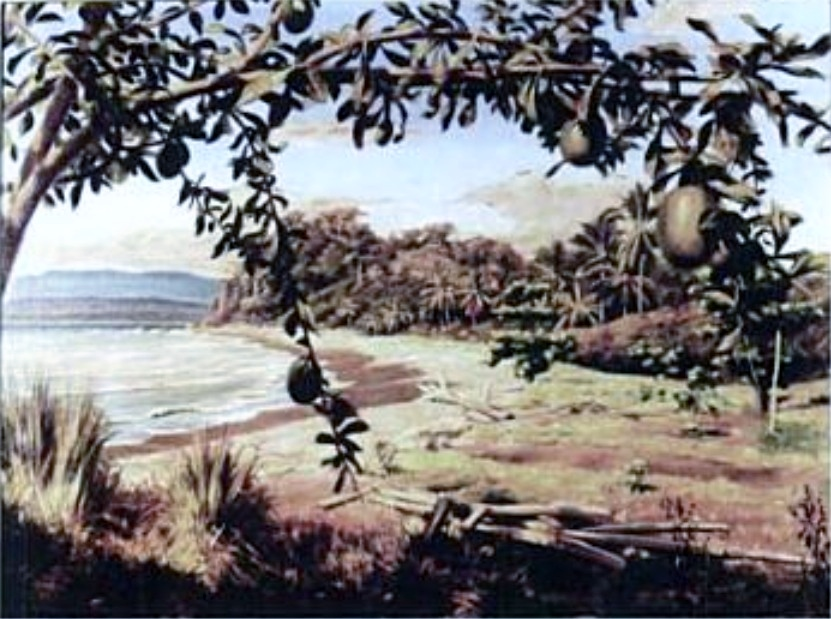
Paisaje de Guanacaste, Emil Span, oil on canvas

Enamored with the landscape of his new country, Span traveled to areas that were difficult to access in those days, such as Tortuguero on the Caribbean; Golfo Dulce; and Coco Bay and Carrillo in Guanacaste. "He fell in love with the Costa Rican landscape," traveling all over the country and painting "many places that were then almost inaccessible," recalled the portrait artist Fabio Fournier.

Span, among other painters, would accompany the Costa Rican artist Ezequiel Jiménez Rojas to paint en plein air. "His landscapes capture spaces that are inundated with light, above all those of the Pacific coast—so different from his portraits, orchids, and allegorical paintings, which were so bound to the European academic tradition. In his landscapes, the hues are richer, a result of direct contact with nature," according to an essay on the visual arts expos in San José from 1928 to 1937.

Fournier recalled that Span lived in a humble house located a block and a half north of the Liceo de Costa Rica. In that little wooden house, that "had not more than one window, he exhibited a number of canvases." The Costa Rican artist met the German when he studied at the Liceo, and while walking between the school and home he would pass Span's house, and stop and look at the canvases through the window. One day, Span invited him to enter, inaugurating a significant friendship.

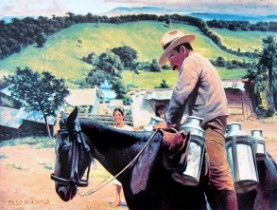
Paso de la Vaca, Emil Span

Span's vision of the Costa Rican population was an idealized one. As the scholar Eugenia Zavaleta, artists at the time excluded from their canvases "the poorest dwellings in the rural and semirural world" and "also misunderstood their residents: the peasants—a group who were increasingly becoming day laborers—whom the crisis of the 1930s battered forcefully." The few peasants represented in these paintings "did not show signs of significant indignity and grief." This can be seen in Span's work, such as in his Paso de la Vaca, in which a dairy farmer is shown "even having time to flirt with a young woman."

Guardia writes that Span "combines a great passion for direct contact with the landscape with an academic background that manifests in a mastery with which he captures the land." She affirms that his paintings of orchids "are an essential record" for the study of Costa Rican flora, because they "combine the vision and aesthetic of the painter with scientific rigor."

The artist also participated in the decoration of San José's National Theatre, painting flowers and fruits on its pendentives. He was selected—alongside Enrique Echandi, Ezequiel Jiménez, and Tomás Povedano—to represent Costa Rica in the 1925 Los Angeles Art Museum's Pan-American Exhibition. Span also participated in the Costa Rican visual arts expos, and he received a gold medal at the first of them, in 1928. On that occasion, he had presented his piece Retrato de John M. Keith, a portrait of John Meiggs Keith, a businessman who established himself in Costa Rica in the late 19th century.

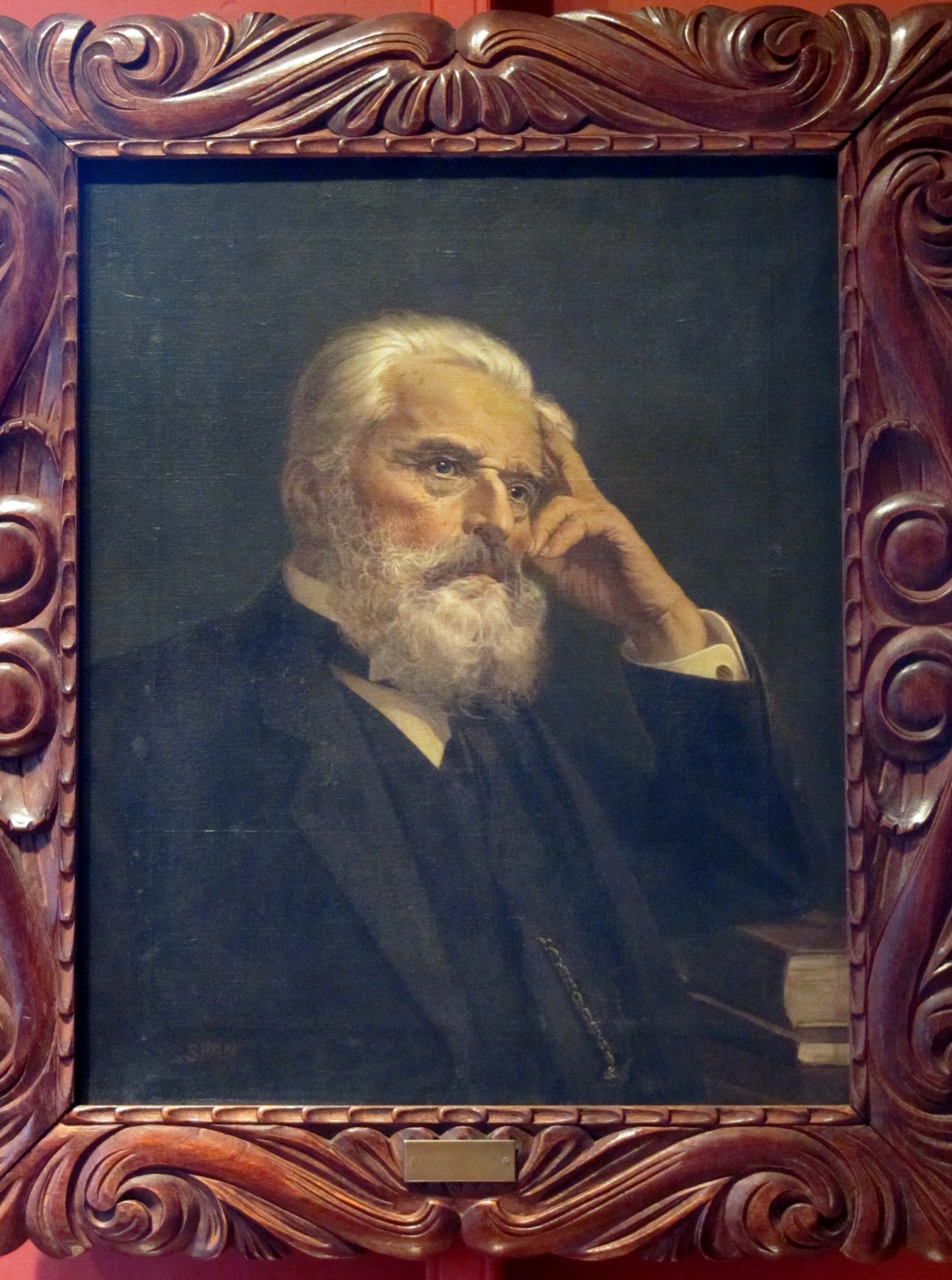
Span's portrait of President José Joaquín Rodríguez Zeledón

An honorary president, alongside Povedano, of the Centro del Arte, Span taught at the School of Fine Arts and judged the second and third visual arts expos in 1930 and 1931.

== Death and legacy ==
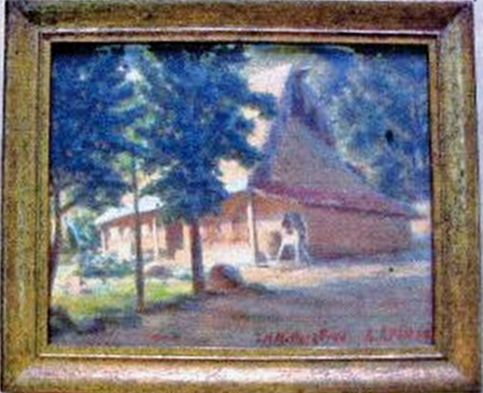
Casa de campo, the Span painting stolen from the National Museum of Costa Rica in 2007

Emil Span died in San José in 1944, just shy of his 75th birthday.

His painting of former President José Joaquín Rodríguez can be seen at the National Museum of Costa Rica, which also displays two of his orchid paintings. His piece Casa de campo, one of around 20 Span paintings owned by the museum, was stolen while on display in July 2007.
