= Felo García =

Costa Rican painter and architect (1928–2023)

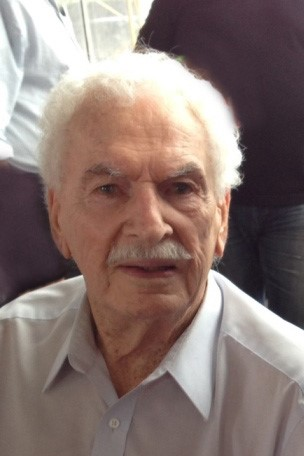
- García in 2016
- Born: Rafael Ángel García Picado; 30 July 1928; Cartago, Costa Rica
- Died: 2 December 2023 (aged 95)
- Other names: Felo García
- Occupation(s): Painter and architect

Rafael Ángel "Felo" García Picado (30 July 1928 – 2 December 2023) was a Costa Rican painter, architect, and footballer.

García was one of Costa Rica's most outstanding art teachers and administrators in the late 20th century. His work as a promoter of Costa Rican culture earned him the nickname "El adelantado" ("The advanced").

== Biography ==
Born in Paraíso de Cartago, García started playing football at Deportivo Saprissa and later played for Club Sport La Libertad and Herediano.

After a time in England, where he played for Hendon to become the first Costa Rican footballer in England, he began his career as a professional football player in Cuba with Real Iberia.

García died on 2 December 2023, at the age of 95.

=== Painting ===
There in 1948, he met Costa Rican artist Manuel de la Cruz González and he began to show his interest in painting as a form of expression. From Cuba, he went to Colombia to continue playing soccer. In Colombia, he discovered the slums of Cali and Medellín, a subject of interest for his first paintings. In 1951 he returned to Costa Rica where, in addition to football, he worked at the Ministry of Public Works and Transportation. With Teodorico Quirós, the architect and landscape painter, he began to paint with greater dedication.

In 1954, he returned to England to continue his studies. There, he found the answer to his artistic concerns in abstract expressionism, a moment in which artists channelled their feelings into works emphasizing plastic elements such as colour, line, texture, and space, but not objective reality. He also formed, with other students in his university, the group New Vision (Nueva Visión) with the intention of painting, exchanging ideas, critiquing each other, and presenting their work in different locations.

In 1956 he returned to Costa Rica, where he found a stagnant art scene. In 1958 he opened the second abstract art exhibition in Costa Rica. Years later, the artist recalled the horrific impact that the works caused, and how the people had mocked them, saying that he did not know how to draw. Subsequently, he formed the group Ocho with other artists, promoting abstract art and performing various cultural activities to fill the existing gaps. In this 1958 exhibition, he presented works related to abstract expression and matérica (material) painting, which used non-traditional materials such as sand, sawdust, and plaster. At the same time, he began to develop calligraphic abstraction and his own gestural "action painting," in which he explored the theme of the big city with its skyscrapers and crowded buildings.

His continued experimentation led him to work with materials like burned resin, as in his Galaxy (1963). He also created works with waste materials like nuts, sheet metal, and wood. With his momentum, the General Department of Arts and Letters (Dirección General de Artes y Letras) was created in 1963, with him as the first director. Thanks to his tireless work at the head of the institution, cultural activities in the country expanded, reaching almost the entire national territory. He began to paint scenes of slums, showing his interest in urbanism, which was linked to his training as an architect and urban planner. His central theme was the slums with houses constructed of poor materials such as cardboard, tin, or wood. In these works, there are no human figures, but their presence is felt through the presence of hanging clothes, electric cables, and lights. These paintings were not intended as a social protest; rather, the issue of poor housing was for him aesthetically appealing.

His dream of creating the School of Architecture at the University of Costa Rica was finally achieved in 1971; he was its first director. One highlight of his tenure was the research project "Bamboo, an alternative to development," which intended to provide solutions to solve the problems of low-income housing.

=== Magón ===
García won the 2008 Magón National Prize for Culture, the highest cultural award that can be given to a Costa Rican artist by the Costa Rican government.
