= Max Jiménez =

Costa Rican writer and artist (1900–1947)

- Born: San José, Costa Rica
- Occupations: Author; engraver; sculptor

Signature
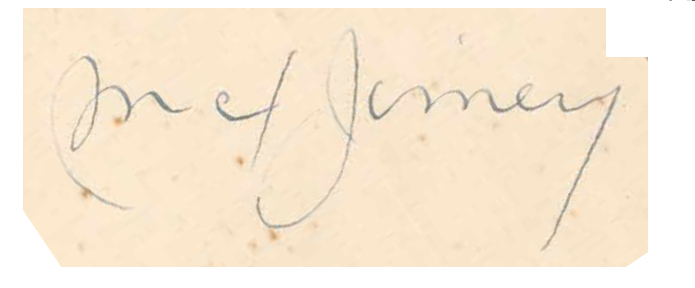

Max Jiménez, one of Costa Rica's important early writers was born in San José, Costa Rica in 1900. His literary works include novels, short stories, essays and poetry, but he is best known for his novel El jaúl (1937), which tells a series of events in an agricultural community in Costa Rica, though the events transcend the country itself. With "El domador de pulgas" Jiménez found himself being strongly criticized by his countrymen, who had felt insulted by the book's message. This led the author to visit bookstores to remove the book from circulation.

In 1928, Jiménez and Teodorico Quirós co-founded the art exhibiting society Círculo de Amigos del Arte (Circle of Friends of Art) in San José. The society acted as a large guild of artists and intellectuals sponsored and brought together noted members of the Costa Rica's artistic elite of the period, including Francisco Amighetti and Francisco Zúñiga.

Aside from literary works, his artistic legacy also includes paintings and engravings. Jiménez was also a sculptor.

He died in 1947 in Buenos Aires, Argentina.

== Published works ==
- Ensayos (1926)
- Unos fantoches (1928)
- Gleba (1929)
- Sonaja (1930)
- Quijongo (1933)
- Revenar (1936)
- El domador de pulgas (1936)
- El jaúl, novela (1937)
- Candelillas (1965)
- Obra literaria de Max Jiménez / editado por Stvdivm Generale Costarricense. (1984) ISBN 978-9977-63-010-6
- Max Jiménez / estudio y compilación de Alfonso Chase. (2000) ISBN 978-9968-31-071-0
- Toda la poesía: poesía 1929–1936 / Selección y prólogo Alfonso Chase. (2000) ISBN 978-9977-65-183-5
- Obra literaria / Compilador, Alvaro Quesada Soto. (2004) ISBN 978-9977-67-857-3

== Criticism ==
- Max Jiménez: catálogo razonado / Floria A. Barrionuevo Ch-A., Mariá Enriqueta Guardia Y. (1999)
- Max Jiménez: aproximaciones críticas / compilador, Álvaro Quesada Soto. (1999) ISBN 978-9977-67-569-5
